= Indo-Aryan migrations =

Migrations of Indo-Aryans into the Indian subcontinent

The Indo-Aryan migrations (Note: The term "invasion", while it was once commonly used in regard to Indo-Aryan migration, is now usually used only by opponents of the Indo-Aryan migration theory. The term "invasion" does not any longer reflect the scholarly understanding of the Indo-Aryan migrations, and is now generally regarded as polemical, distracting and unscholarly.) were the migrations into South Asia of Indo-Aryan peoples, an ethnolinguistic group that spoke Indo-Aryan languages. These are the predominant languages of today's Bangladesh, Maldives, Nepal, North India, Pakistan, and Sri Lanka.

Indo-Aryan migration into the region, from Central Asia, is considered to have started after 2000 BCE as a slow diffusion during the Late Harappan period and led to a language shift in the northern Indian subcontinent. Several hundred years later, the Iranian languages were brought into the Iranian plateau by the Iranians, who were closely related to the Indo-Aryans.

The Proto-Indo-Iranian culture, which gave rise to the Indo-Aryan peoples and Iranians, developed on the Central Asian steppes north of the Caspian Sea as the Sintashta culture (c. 2200–1900 BCE), in present-day Russia and Kazakhstan, and developed further as the Andronovo culture (2000–1450 BCE).

The Indo-Aryans split off sometime between 2000 BCE and 1600 BCE from the Indo-Iranians, and migrated southwards to the Bactria–Margiana culture (BMAC), from which they borrowed some of their distinctive religious beliefs and practices, but there is little evidence of genetic mingling. From the BMAC, the Indo-Aryans migrated into northern Syria and, possibly in multiple waves, into the Punjab (northern Pakistan and India), while the Iranians could have reached western Iran before 1300 BCE, both bringing with them the Indo-Iranian languages.

Migration by an Indo-European-speaking people was first hypothesized in the mid 17th century, by Dutch scholar Marcus Zuerius van Boxhorn, in his Scythian language and people hypothesis, to explain the linguistic similarities of the Indo-European language family, that had been identified a century earlier; he proposed a single source or origin, which was diffused by migrations from some original homeland. The language-family and migration theory were further developed, in the 18th century, by Jesuit missionary Gaston-Laurent Coeurdoux, and later East India Company employee William Jones, in 1786, through analysing similarities between European, West Asian, and South Asian languages.

This linguistic argument of this theory is supported by archaeological, anthropological, genetic, literary and ecological research. Literary research reveals similarities between various, geographically distinct, Indo-Aryan historical cultures. Ecological studies reveal that in the second millennium BCE widespread aridisation led to water shortages and ecological changes in both the Eurasian steppes and the Indian subcontinent, (Note: Rajesh Kochhar (2017), "The Aryan chromosome", The Indian Express) causing the collapse of sedentary urban cultures in south central Asia, Afghanistan, Iran, and India, and triggering large-scale migrations, resulting in the merger of migrating peoples with the post-urban cultures. Comparisons of ancient DNA samples with modern South Asians populations reveal a significant infusion of male Steppe ancestry, in the second millennia BCE, with a disproportionately high contribution today present in many Brahmin and Bhumihar groups; elite populations that traditionally use an Indo-European language.

The Indo-Aryan migrations started sometime in the period from approximately 2000 to 1600 BCE, after the invention of the war chariot, and also brought Indo-Aryan languages into the Levant and possibly Inner Asia. It was part of the diffusion of Indo-European languages from the proto-Indo-European homeland at the Pontic–Caspian steppe, a large area of grasslands in far Eastern Europe, which started in the 5th to 4th millennia BCE, and the Indo-European migrations out of the Eurasian Steppes, which started approximately in 2000 BCE.

These Indo-Aryan speaking people were united by shared cultural norms and language, referred to as ārya, "noble". Diffusion of this culture and language took place by patron-client systems, which allowed for the absorption and acculturation of other groups into this culture, and explains the strong influence on other cultures with which it interacted.

== Fundamentals ==
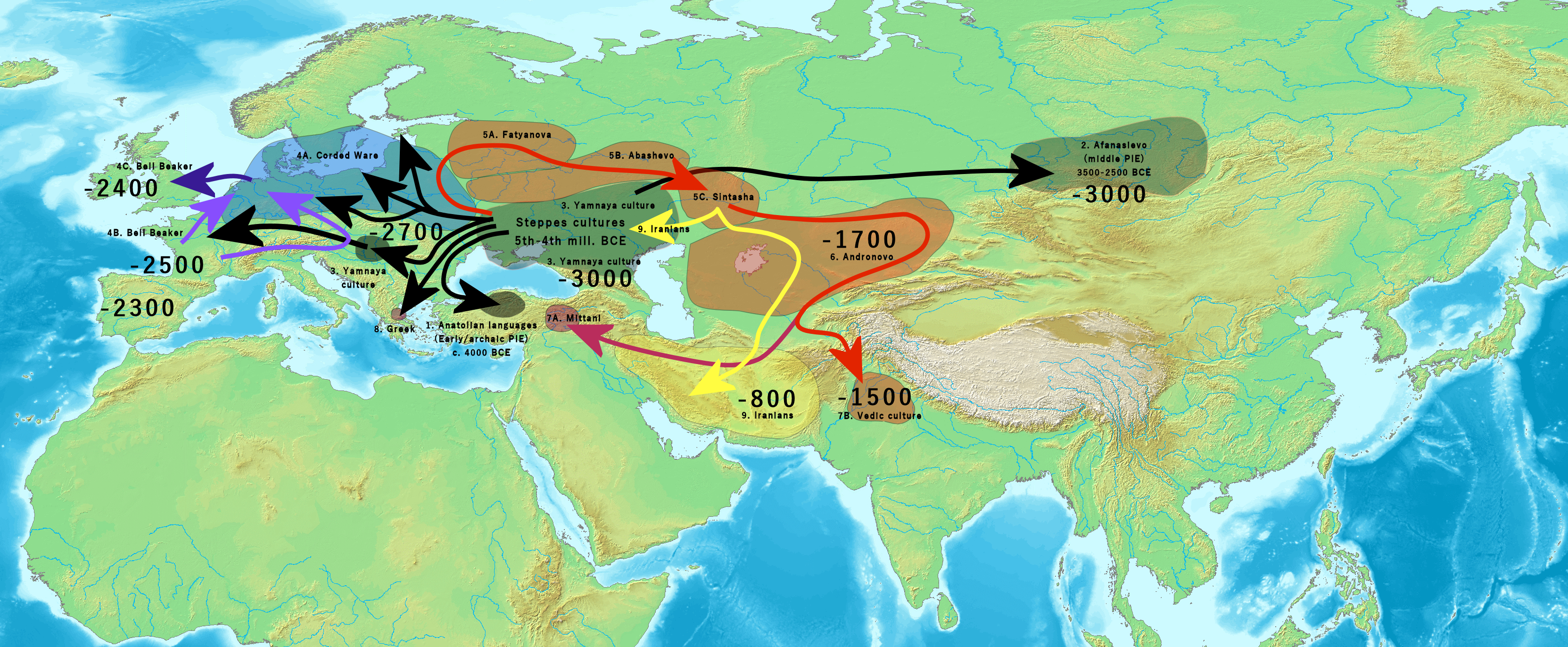
Scheme of Indo-European language dispersals from c. 4000 to 1000 BCE according to the widely held Kurgan hypothesis. – Center: Steppe cultures 1 (black): Anatolian languages (archaic PIE) 2 (black): Afanasievo culture (early PIE) 3 (black) Yamnaya culture expansion (Pontic-Caspian steppe, Danube Valley) (late PIE) 4A (black): Western Corded Ware 4B-C (blue & dark blue): Bell Beaker; adopted by Indo-European speakers 5A-B (red): Eastern Corded ware 5C (red): Sintashta (proto-Indo-Iranian) 6 (red): Andronovo 7A (red): Indo-Aryans (Mittani) 7B (magenta): Indo-Aryans (India) [NN] (dark yellow): proto-Balto-Slavic 8 (grey): Greek 9 (yellow):Iranians – [not drawn]: Armenian, expanding from western steppe

The Indo-Aryan migration theory is part of a larger theoretical framework. This framework explains the similarities between a wide range of contemporary and ancient languages. It combines linguistic, archaeological and anthropological research. This provides an overview of the development of Indo-European languages, and the spread of these Indo-European languages by migration and acculturation.

=== Linguistics: relationships between languages ===
The linguistic part traces the connections between the various Indo-European languages, and reconstructs the proto-Indo-European language. This is possible because the processes that change languages are not random, but follow strict patterns. Sound shifts, the changing of vowels and consonants, are especially important, although grammar (especially morphology) and the lexicon (vocabulary) may also be significant. Historical-comparative linguistics thus makes it possible to see great similarities between related languages which at first sight might seem very different. Various characteristics of the Indo-European languages argue against an Indian origin of these languages, and point to a steppe origin.

=== Archaeology: migrations from the steppe Urheimat ===
The archaeological part posits an "Urheimat" on the Pontic steppes, which developed after the introduction of cattle on the steppes around 5,200 BCE. This introduction marked the change from foragist to pastoralist cultures, and the development of a hierarchical social system with chieftains, patron-client systems, and the exchange of goods and gifts. The oldest nucleus may have been the Samara culture (late 6th and early 5th millennium BCE), at a bend in the Volga.

A wider "horizon" developed, called the Kurgan culture by Marija Gimbutas in the 1950s. She included several cultures in this "Kurgan Culture", including the Samara culture and the Yamna culture, although the Yamna culture (36th–23rd centuries BCE), also called "Pit Grave Culture", may more aptly be called the "nucleus" of the proto-Indo-European language. From this area, which already included various subcultures, Indo-European languages spread west, south and east starting around 4,000 BCE. These languages may have been carried by small groups of males, with patron-client systems which allowed for the inclusion of other groups into their cultural system.

Eastward emerged the Sintashta culture (2200–1900 BCE), where common Indo-Iranian was spoken. Out of the Sintashta culture developed the Andronovo culture (2000–1450 BCE), which interacted with the Bactria-Margiana culture (2250–1700 BCE). This interaction further shaped the Indo-Iranians, which split at sometime between 2000 and 1600 BCE into the Indo-Aryans and the Iranians. The Indo-Aryans migrated to the Levant and South Asia. According to Witzel, the spread of Indo-European languages and culture into Northern India could have been driven by small groups. (Note: Michael Witzel: "Just one 'Afghan' IA tribe that did not return to the highlands but stayed in their Panjab winter quarters in spring was needed to set off a wave of acculturation in the plains, by transmitting its 'status kit' (Ehret) to its neighbors." Compare Max Muller: "why should not one shepherd, with his servants and flocks, have transferred his peculiar dialect from one part of Asia or Europe to another? This may seem a very humble and modest view of what was formerly represented as the irresistible stream of mighty waves rolling forth from the Aryan centre and gradually overflowing the mountains and valleys of Asia and Europe, but it is, at all events, a possible view; nay, I should say a view far more in keeping with what we know of recent colonisation.") Their culture and language spread by the same mechanisms of acculturalisation, and the absorption of other groups into their patron-client system.

=== Anthropology: elite recruitment and language shift ===
Indo-European languages probably spread through language shifts. Small groups can change a larger cultural area, and elite male dominance by small groups may have led to a language shift in northern India.

David Anthony, in his "revised Steppe hypothesis" notes that the spread of the Indo-European languages probably did not happen through "chain-type folk migrations", but by the introduction of these languages by ritual and political elites, which were emulated by large groups of people, (Note: David Anthony (1995): "Language shift can be understood best as a social strategy through which individuals and groups compete for positions of prestige, power, and domestic security [...] What is important, then, is not just dominance, but vertical social mobility and a linkage between language and access to positions of prestige and power [...] A relatively small immigrant elite population can encourage widespread language shift among numerically dominant indigenes in a non-state or pre-state context if the elite employs a specific combination of encouragements and punishments. Ethnohistorical cases [...] demonstrate that small elite groups have successfully imposed their languages in non-state situations.") a process which he calls "elite recruitment".

According to Parpola, local elites joined "small but powerful groups" of Indo-European speaking migrants. These migrants had an attractive social system and good weapons, and luxury goods which marked their status and power. Joining these groups was attractive for local leaders, since it strengthened their position, and gave them additional advantages. These new members were further incorporated by matrimonial alliances.

According to Joseph Salmons, language shift is facilitated by "dislocation" of language communities, in which the elite is taken over. According to Salmons, this change is facilitated by "systematic changes in community structure", in which a local community becomes incorporated in a larger social structure. (Note: Note the dislocation of the Indus Valley civilisation prior to the start of the Indo-Aryan migrations into northern India, and the onset of Sanskritisation with the rise of the Kuru kingdom, as described by Michael Witzel. The "Ancestral North Indians" and "Ancestral South Indians" mixed between 4,200 to 1,900 years ago (2200 BCE–100 CE), whereafter a shift to endogamy took place.)

=== Genetics: ancient ancestry and multiple gene flows ===
Genetic studies have revealed that at the start of the second millennia BCE, the South Asian population was significantly comprised from a mix of Ancient Ancestral South Indians (AASI), and Iranian Farmer (IR) ancestry, with a cline, running from North West to South, correlating with the admixture of Iranian Farmer ancestry. The Indus Periphery Cline, associated with the population of the Indus Valley Civilisation, had a majority of Iranian Farmer heritage, a minority of AASI, and had no detectable Steppe ancestry. Post the decline of the Indus Valley Civilisation, in the second millennia BCE, a significant amount of male Steppe ancestry appeared in to the North West of the region, to create identifiable Ancient North Indian (ANI), and Ancient South Indian (ASI) clines, the ANI cline differentiated by included Steppe heritage. (Note: Basu et al. (2016) discern four major ancestries in mainland India, namely ANI, ASI, Ancestral Austro-Asiatic tribals (AAA) and Ancestral Tibeto-Burman (ATB).) These two groups mixed in India between 4,200 and 1,900 years ago (2200 BCE – 100 CE), after which a shift to endogamy took place, possibly by the enforcement of "social values and norms" during the Gupta Empire (240-550 CE). Studies indicate north and south Indians share a common maternal ancestry. While studies of living South Asian populations show a disproportionate presence of ANI / Steppe ancestry within the elite Brahmin castes, historic users and keepers of Indo-Aryan texts.

Moorjani et al. (2013) describe three scenarios regarding the bringing together of the two groups: migrations before the development of agriculture before 8,000–9,000 years before present (BP); migration of western Asian (Note: See also Fertile Crescent, Western Asia and Near East.) people together with the spread of agriculture, maybe up to 4,600 years BP; migrations of western Eurasians from 3,000 to 4,000 years BP.

Percentage of adults that can digest lactose

While Reich notes that the onset of admixture coincides with the arrival of Indo-European language, (Note: Edge (2016), The Genomic Ancient DNA Revolution. A New Way to Investigate the Past. A Conversation With David Reich [2.1.16]) according to Moorjani et al. (2013) these groups were present "unmixed" in India before the Indo-Aryan migrations. Gallego Romero et al. (2011) propose that the ANI component came from Iran and the Middle East, less than 10,000 years ago, (Note: Rob Mitchum (2011), Lactose Tolerance in the Indian Dairyland, ScienceLife) (Note: Both Renfrew and Cavalli-Sforza propose that proto-Dravidian was brought to India by farmers from the Iranian part of the Fertile Crescent. The Dravidian language was present in northern India at the time of the arrival of the Indo-Aryans, who borrowed a substantial number of words from the Dravidian language.) while according to Lazaridis et al. (2016) ANI is a mix of "early farmers of western Iran" and "people of the Bronze Age Eurasian steppe". Several studies also show traces of later influxes of maternal genetic material (Note: Kivisild et al. (2000), An Indian Ancestry, p.271 (referring to Kivisild et al. (1999), "Deep common ancestry")) and of paternal genetic material related to ANI and possibly the Indo-Europeans.

Others have analysed the hereditary distribution of lactose intolerance, and specifically the presence of the -13910T lactase persistence mutation, found in Europe and Central Asia, across South Asia.

In parallel the dating, and genetic lineage, of the domestic horse within South Asia is a field of research.

=== Literary research: similarities, geography, and references to migration ===
The oldest known inscribed Indo-Iranian words, and particularly invocations of the Indo-Aryan deities, date to mid second millennia BCE, as loan words in Hurrian treaties of the Mitanni kingdom, of present-day northern Syria.

The religious practices depicted in the Rigveda and those depicted in the Avesta, the central religious text of Zoroastrianism, show similarities. Some of the references to the Sarasvati in the Rigveda refer to the Ghaggar-Hakra River, while the Haraxvaiti River in Afghanistan, or the Helmand River it feeds is sometimes quoted as the locus of the early Rigvedic river Sarasvati. The Rigveda does not explicitly refer to an external homeland or to a migration, but later Vedic and Puranic texts do show the movement into the Gangetic plains. A number of Indologists and historians offering the Baudhayana Shrauta Sutra, verse 18.44:397.9, as explicit recorded evidence of a migration:

Then, there is the following direct statement contained in (the admittedly much later) BSS [Baudhāyana Śrauta Sūtra] 18.44:397.9 sqq which has once again been overlooked, not having been translated yet: "Ayu went eastwards. His (people) are the Kuru Panchala and the Kasi-Videha. This is the Ayava (migration). (His other people) stayed at home. His people are the Gandhari, Parsu and Aratta. This is the Amavasava (group)" (Witzel 1989: 235).

=== Ecological studies: widespread drought, urban collapse, and pastoral migrations ===
Climate change and drought may have triggered both the initial dispersal of Indo-European speakers, and the migration of Indo-Europeans from the steppes in south central Asia and India.

Around 4200–4100 BCE a climate change occurred, manifesting in colder winters in Europe. Steppe herders, archaic Proto-Indo-European speakers, spread into the lower Danube valley about 4200–4000 BCE, either causing or taking advantage of the collapse of Old Europe.

The Yamna horizon was an adaptation to a climate change which occurred between 3500 and 3000 BCE, in which the steppes became drier and cooler. Herds needed to be moved frequently to feed them sufficiently, and the use of wagons and horse-back riding made this possible, leading to "a new, more mobile form of pastoralism".

In the third millennium BCE widespread aridification led to water shortages and ecological changes in both the Eurasian steppes and the Indian subcontinent. On the steppes, humidification led to a change of vegetation, triggering "higher mobility and transition to nomadic cattle breeding". (Note: Demkina et al. (2017): "In the second millennium BC, humidification of the climate led to the divergence of the soil cover with secondary formation of the complexes of chestnut soils and solonetzes. This paleoecological crisis had a significant effect on the economy of the tribes in the Late Catacomb and Post-Catacomb time stipulating their higher mobility and transition to the nomadic cattle breeding.") (Note: See also Eurogenes Blogspot, The crisis.) Water shortage also had a strong impact in the Indian subcontinent, "causing the collapse of sedentary urban cultures in south central Asia, Afghanistan, Iran, and India, and triggering large-scale migrations".

== Development of the theory ==
=== Similarities between Sanskrit, Persian, Greek ===
In the 16th century, European visitors to India became aware of similarities between Indian and European languages and as early as 1653 Van Boxhorn had published a proposal for a proto-language ("Scythian") for Germanic, Romance, Greek, Baltic, Slavic, Celtic, Indo-Iranic, and (incorrectly) Turkish.

In a memoir sent to the French Academy of Sciences in 1767 Gaston-Laurent Coeurdoux, a French Jesuit who spent all his life in India, had specifically demonstrated the existing analogy between Sanskrit and European languages. (Note: See: Duperron, Anquetil (1808), Histoire et mémoires de l'Académie des Inscriptions et Belles-Lettres, de 1701 à 1793, imprimerie royale; Godfrey, John J. (1967). "Sir William Jones and Père Coeurdoux: A philological footnote". Journal of the American Oriental Society. 87 (1): 57–59. doi:10.2307/596596. JSTOR 596596.)

In 1786 William Jones, a judge in the Supreme Court of Judicature at Fort William, Calcutta, linguist, and classics scholar, on studying Sanskrit, postulated, in his Third Anniversary Discourse to the Asiatic Society, a proto-language uniting Sanskrit, Persian, Greek, Latin, Gothic and Celtic languages, but in many ways his work was less accurate than his predecessors', as he erroneously included Egyptian, Japanese and Chinese in the Indo-European languages, while omitting Hindustani and Slavic:

The Sanskrit language, whatever be its antiquity, is of a wonderful structure; more perfect than the Greek, more copious than the Latin, and more exquisitely refined than either, yet bearing to both of them a stronger affinity, both in the roots of verbs and in the forms of grammar, than could possibly have been produced by accident; so strong indeed, that no philologer could examine them all three, without believing them to have sprung from some common source, which, perhaps, no longer exists: there is a similar reason, though not quite so forcible, for supposing that both the Gothic and the Celtic, though blended with a very different idiom, had the same origin with the Sanskrit; and the old Persian might be added to the same family, if this were the place for discussing any question concerning the antiquities of Persia. (Note: Jonathan Slocum, What is Historical Linguistics? What are 'Indo-European' Languages?, The University of Texas at Austin Archived 30 October 2007 at the Wayback Machine)

Jones concluded that all these languages originated from the same source.

=== Homeland ===
Scholars assume a homeland either in central Asia or in Western Asia, and Sanskrit must in this case have reached India by a language transfer from west to east. In 19th century Indo-European studies, the language of the Rigveda was then the most archaic Indo-European language known to scholars, indeed the only records of Indo-European that could reasonably claim to date to the Bronze Age. This primacy of Sanskrit inspired scholars such as Friedrich Schlegel, to assume that the locus of the proto-Indo-European homeland had been in India, with the other dialects spread to the west by historical migration.

With the 20th-century discovery of Bronze-Age attestations of Indo-European (Anatolian, Mycenaean Greek), Vedic Sanskrit lost its special status as the most archaic Indo-European language known.

=== Aryan "race" ===
A 1910 depiction of Aryans entering India, from Hutchinson's History of the Nations

In the 1850s Max Müller introduced the notion of two Aryan races, a western and an eastern one, who migrated from the Caucasus into Europe and India respectively. Müller dichotomized the two groups, ascribing greater prominence and value to the western branch. Nevertheless, this "eastern branch of the Aryan race was more powerful than the indigenous eastern natives, who were easy to conquer".

Herbert Hope Risley expanded on Müller's two-race Indo-European speaking Aryan invasion theory, concluding that the caste system was a remnant of the Indo-Aryans domination of the native Dravidians, with observable variations in phenotypes between hereditary race-based castes. Thomas Trautmann explains that Risley "found a direct relation between the proportion of Aryan blood and the nasal index, along a gradient from the highest castes to the lowest. This assimilation of caste to race proved very influential."

Müller's work contributed to the developing interest in Aryan culture, which often set Indo-European ('Aryan') traditions in opposition to Semitic religions. He was "deeply saddened by the fact that these classifications later came to be expressed in racist terms", as this was far from his intention. (Note: Esleben: "In later years, especially before his death, he was deeply saddened by the fact that these classifications later came to be expressed in racist terms.") For Müller the discovery of common Indian and European ancestry was a powerful argument against racism, arguing that "an ethnologist who speaks of Aryan race, Aryan blood, Aryan eyes and hair, is as great a sinner as a linguist who speaks of a dolichocephalic dictionary or a brachycephalic grammar" and that "the blackest Hindus represent an earlier stage of Aryan speech and thought than the fairest Scandinavians". In his later work, Max Müller took great care to limit the use of the term "Aryan" to a strictly linguistic one.

=== "Aryan invasion" ===
The excavation of the Harappa, Mohenjo-daro and Lothal sites of the Indus Valley Civilisation (IVC) in the 1920, showed that northern India already had an advanced culture when the Indo-Aryans migrated into the area. The theory changed from a migration of advanced Aryans towards a primitive aboriginal population, to a migration of nomadic people into an advanced urban civilization, comparable to the Germanic migrations during the Fall of the Western Roman Empire, or the Kassite invasion of Babylonia.

This possibility was for a short time seen as a hostile invasion into northern India. The decline of the Indus Valley Civilisation at precisely the period in history in which the Indo-Aryan migrations probably took place, seemed to provide independent support of such an invasion. This argument was proposed by the mid-20th century archaeologist Mortimer Wheeler, who interpreted the presence of many unburied corpses found in the top levels of Mohenjo-daro as the victims of conquest wars, and who famously stated that the god "Indra stands accused" of the destruction of the Civilisation.

This position was discarded after finding no evidence of wars. The skeletons were found to be hasty interments, not massacred victims. Wheeler himself also nuanced this interpretation in later publications, stating "This is a possibility, but it can't be proven, and it may not be correct." Wheeler further notes that the unburied corpses may indicate an event in the final phase of human occupation of Mohenjo-Daro, and that thereafter the place was uninhabited, but that the decay of Mohenjo-Daro has to be ascribed to structural causes such as salinisation.

Nevertheless, although scholars have discredited the 'invasion' theory, critics of the Indo-Aryan Migration model continue to present the latter as an "Aryan Invasion Theory", (Note: According to Bryant, keeping up-to-date is problematic for many Indian scholars, since most Indian universities don't have enough funds to keep up with current scholarship, and most Indian scholars are not able to gain access to recent western publications. Bryant further notes that "while one would be lucky to find a book by Max Muller even in the antique book markets of London, one can find a plethora of recent-edition publications of his and other nineteenth-century scholars' works in just about any bookstore in India (some of these on their tenth or twelfth edition). Practically speaking, it is small Delhi publishers that are keeping the most crude versions of the Aryan invasion theory alive by their nineteenth-century reprints! These are some of the main sources available to most Indian readers.") painting the latter as a racist and colonialist discourse:

The theory of an immigration of IA speaking Arya ("Aryan invasion") is simply seen [by the opponents of the theory] as a means of British policy to justify their own intrusion into India and their subsequent colonial rule: in both cases, a "white race" was seen as subduing the local darker colored population.
However, present (European, American, Japanese, etc.) Indologists do not maintain anything like this now, even less so after the recent genetic discoveries that link [...] all non-Africans to an [...] emigration by some 10,000 people "Out of Africa," some 50,000 years ago: the problem of an "Aryan invasion" into India is as relevant or irrelevant to Indologists as Bantu "invasion" of central, east, and southern Africa, or the polar Na-Dene deep into North America.

=== Aryan migration ===
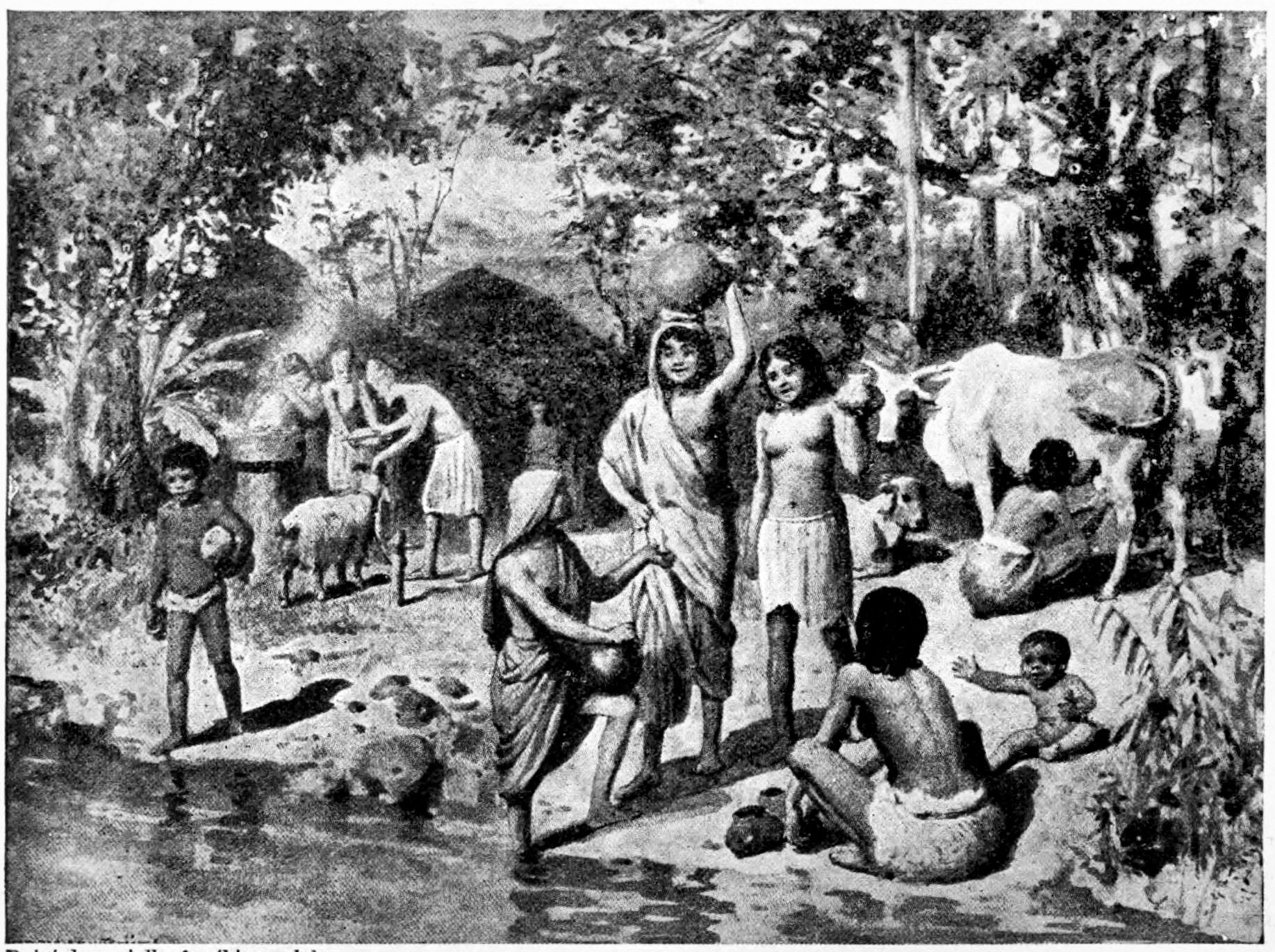
An early 20th century depiction of Aryans settling in agricultural villages in India

In the later 20th century, ideas were refined along with data accrual, and migration and acculturation were seen as the methods whereby Indo-Aryans and their language and culture spread into northwest India around 1500 BCE. The term "invasion" is only being used nowadays by opponents of the Indo-Aryan Migration theory. Michael Witzel:

...it has been supplanted by much more sophisticated models over the past few decades [...] philologists first, and archaeologists somewhat later, noticed certain inconsistencies in the older theory and tried to find new explanations, a new version of the immigration theories. (Note: Michael Witzel: "In these views, though often for quite different reasons, any immigration or trickling in – nearly always called "invasion" – of the (Indo-)Aryans into the subcontinent is suspect or simply denied. The Arya of the Rigveda are supposed to be just another tribe or group of tribes that have always been resident in India, next to Dravidians, Mundas, etc. The theory of an immigration of IA speaking Arya ("Aryan invasion") is simply seen as a means of British policy to justify their own intrusion into India and their subsequent colonial rule: in both cases, a "white race" was seen as subduing the local darker colored population. However, present (European, American, Japanese, etc.) Indologists do not maintain anything like this now [...] While the "invasion model" was still prominent in the work of archaeologists such as Wheeler (1966: "Indra stands accused"), it has been supplanted by much more sophisticated models over the past few decades (see Kuiper 1955 sqq.; Thapar 1968; Witzel 1995). This development has not occurred because Indologists were reacting, as is now frequently alleged, to current Indian criticism of the older theory. Rather, philologists first, and archaeologists somewhat later, noticed certain inconsistencies in the older theory and tried to find new explanations, a new version of the immigration theories.)

The changed approach was in line with newly developed thinking about language transfer in general, such as the migration of the Greeks into Greece (between 2100 and 1600 BCE) and their adoption of a syllabic script, Linear B, from the pre-existing Linear A, with the purpose of writing Mycenaean Greek, or the Indo-Europeanization of Western Europe (in stages between 2200 and 1300 BCE).

=== Future directions ===
Mallory notes that with the development and the growing sophistication of the knowledge on the Indo-European migrations and their purported homeland, new questions arise, and that "it is evident that we still have a very long way to go." One of those questions is the origin of the shared agricultural vocabulary, and the earliest dates for agriculturalism in areas settled by the Indo-Europeans. Current estimates appear to be too late to account for the shared vocabulary, and so raise questions regarding the shared vocabulary's origins.

== Linguistics: relationships between languages ==
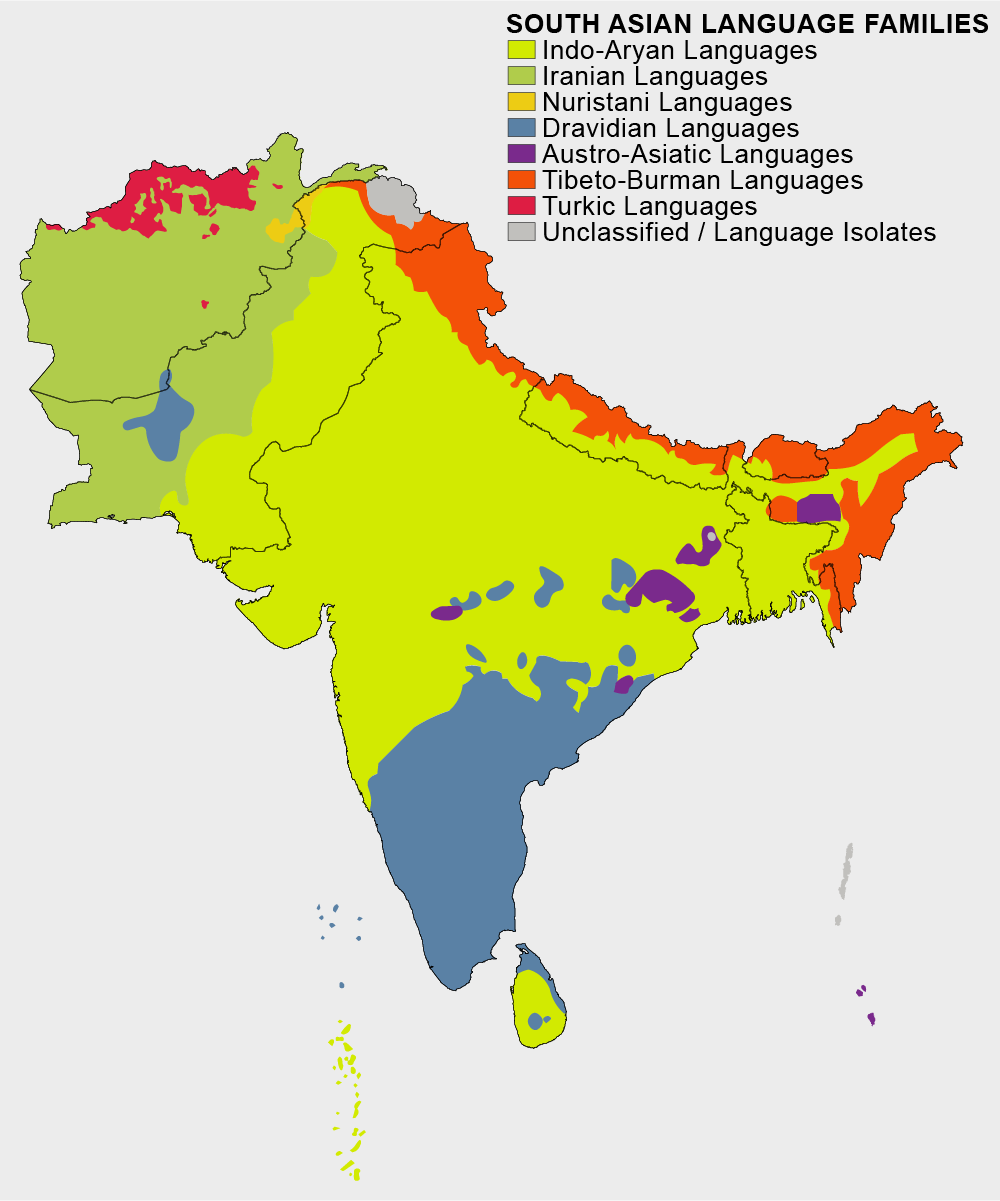
Map of language families in South Asia.

Linguistic research traces the connections between the various Indo-European languages, and reconstructs proto-Indo-European. Accumulated linguistic evidence points to the Indo-Aryan languages as intrusive into the Indian subcontinent, some time in the 2nd millennium BCE. The language of the Rigveda, the earliest stratum of Vedic Sanskrit, is assigned to about 1500–1200 BCE.

=== Comparative method ===
Connections between languages can be traced because the processes that change languages are not random, but follow strict patterns. Especially sound shifts, the changing of vowels and consonants, are important, although grammar (especially morphology) and the lexicon (vocabulary) may also be significant. Historical-comparative linguistics thus makes it possible to see great similarities between languages which at first sight might seem very different.

Linguistics use the comparative method to study the development of languages by performing a feature-by-feature comparison of two or more languages with common descent from a shared ancestor, as opposed to the method of internal reconstruction, which analyses the internal development of a single language over time. Ordinarily both methods are used together to reconstruct prehistoric phases of languages, to fill in gaps in the historical record of a language, to discover the development of phonological, morphological, and other linguistic systems, and to confirm or refute hypothesized relationships between languages.

The comparative method aims to prove that two or more historically attested languages are descended from a single proto-language by comparing lists of cognate terms. From them, regular sound correspondences between the languages are established, and a sequence of regular sound changes can then be postulated, which allows the proto-language to be reconstructed. Relation is deemed certain only if at least a partial reconstruction of the common ancestor is feasible, and if regular sound correspondences can be established with chance similarities ruled out.

The comparative method was developed over the 19th century. Key contributions were made by the Danish scholars Rasmus Rask and Karl Verner and the German scholar Jacob Grimm. The first linguist to offer reconstructed forms from a proto-language was August Schleicher, in his Compendium der vergleichenden Grammatik der indogermanischen Sprachen, originally published in 1861.

=== Proto-Indo-European ===
Proto-Indo-European (PIE) is the linguistic reconstruction of the common ancestor of the Indo-European languages. August Schleicher's 1861 reconstruction of PIE was the first proposed proto-language to be accepted by modern linguists. More work has gone into reconstructing it than any other proto-language, and it is by far the best understood among all proto-languages of its age. During the 19th century, the vast majority of linguistic work was devoted to reconstruction of Proto-Indo-European or its daughter proto-languages such as Proto-Germanic, and most of the current techniques of linguistic reconstruction in historical linguistics (e.g., the comparative method and the method of internal reconstruction) were developed as a result.

PIE must have been spoken as a single language or a group of related dialects (before divergence began), though estimates of when this was by different authorities can vary massively, from the 7th millennium BCE to the second. A number of hypotheses have been proposed for the origin and spread of the language, the most popular among linguists being the Kurgan hypothesis, which postulates an origin in the Pontic–Caspian steppe of Eastern Europe in the 5th or 4th millennia BCE. Features of the culture of the speakers of PIE, known as Proto-Indo-Europeans, have also been reconstructed based on the shared vocabulary of the early attested Indo-European languages.

As mentioned above, the existence of PIE was first postulated in the 18th century by Sir William Jones, who observed the similarities between Sanskrit, Ancient Greek, and Latin. By the early 20th century, well-defined descriptions of PIE had been developed that are still accepted today (with some refinements). The largest developments of the 20th century were the discovery of the Anatolian and Tocharian languages and the acceptance of the laryngeal theory. The Anatolian languages have also spurred a major re-evaluation of theories concerning the development of various shared Indo-European language features and the extent to which these features were present in PIE itself. Relationships to other language families, including the Uralic languages, have been proposed but remain controversial.

PIE is thought to have had a complex system of morphology that included inflectional suffixes as well as ablaut (vowel alterations, as preserved in English sing, sang, sung). Nouns and verbs had complex systems of declension and conjugation respectively.

=== Arguments against an Indian origin of proto-Indo-European ===
==== Diversity ====
According to the linguistic center of gravity principle, the most likely point of origin of a language family is in the area of its greatest diversity. (Note: Latham, as cited in Mallory 1989, p. 152) By this criterion, Northern India, home to only a single branch of the Indo-European language family (i.e., Indo-Aryan), is an exceedingly unlikely candidate for the Indo-European homeland, compared to Central-Eastern Europe, for example, which is home to the Italic, Venetic, Illyrian, Albanian, Germanic, Baltic, Slavic, Thracian and Greek branches of Indo-European.

Both mainstream Urheimat solutions locate the Proto-Indo-European homeland in the vicinity of the Black Sea.

==== Dialectal variation ====
It has been recognized since the mid-19th century, beginning with Schmidt and Schuchardt, that a binary tree model cannot capture all linguistic alignments; certain areal features cut across language groups and are better explained through a model treating linguistic change like waves rippling out through a pond. This is true of the Indo-European languages as well. Various features originated and spread while Proto-Indo-European was still a dialect continuum. These features sometimes cut across sub-families: for instance, the instrumental, dative and ablative plurals in Germanic and Balto-Slavic feature endings beginning with -m-, rather than the usual -*bh-, e.g. Gothic dative plural sunum 'to the sons' and Old Church Slavonic instrumental plural synъ-mi 'with sons', despite the fact that the Germanic languages are centum, while Balto-Slavic languages are satem.

The strong correspondence between the dialectal relationships of the Indo-European languages and their actual geographical arrangement in their earliest attested forms makes an Indian origin, as suggested by the Out of India Theory, unlikely.

==== Substrate influence ====
Already in the 1870s the Neogrammarians realised that the Greek/Latin vocalism couldn't be explained on the basis of the Sanskrit one, and therefore must be more original. The Indo-Iranian and Uralic languages influenced each other, with the Finno-Ugric languages containing Indo-European loan words. A telling example is the Finnish word vasara, "hammer", which is related to vajra, the weapon of Indra. Since the Finno-Ugric homeland was located in the northern forest zone in northern Europe, the contacts must have taken place – in line with the placement of the proto-Indo-European homeland at the Pontic-Caspian steppes – between the Black Sea and the Caspian Sea.

Dravidian and other South Asian languages share with Indo-Aryan a number of syntactical and morphological features that are alien to other Indo-European languages, including even its closest relative, Old Iranian. Phonologically, there is the introduction of retroflexes, which alternate with dentals in Indo-Aryan; morphologically there are the gerunds; and syntactically there is the use of a quotative marker (iti). (Note: Krishnamurti states: "Besides, the Ṛg Vedas has used the gerund, not found in Avestan, with the same grammatical function as in Dravidian, as a non-finite verb for 'incomplete' action. Ṛg Vedic language also attests the use of it as a quotation clause complementary. All these features are not a consequence of simple borrowing but they indicate substratum influence (Kuiper 1991: ch 2)".) These are taken as evidence of substratum influence.

It has been argued that Dravidian influenced Indic through "shift", whereby native Dravidian speakers learned and adopted Indic languages. The presence of Dravidian structural features in Old Indo-Aryan is thus plausibly explained, that the majority of early Old Indo-Aryan speakers had a Dravidian mother tongue which they gradually abandoned. Even though the innovative traits in Indic could be explained by multiple internal explanations, early Dravidian influence is the only explanation that can account for all of the innovations at once – it becomes a question of explanatory parsimony; moreover, early Dravidian influence accounts for several of the innovative traits in Indic better than any internal explanation that has been proposed.

A pre-Indo-European linguistic substratum in the Indian subcontinent would be a good reason to exclude India as a potential Indo-European homeland. However, several linguists, all of whom accept the external origin of the Aryan languages on other grounds, are still open to considering the evidence as internal developments rather than the result of substrate influences, or as adstratum effects.

== Archaeology: migrations from the steppe Urheimat ==
Indo-European migration

The Yamna culture 3500–2000 BCE.

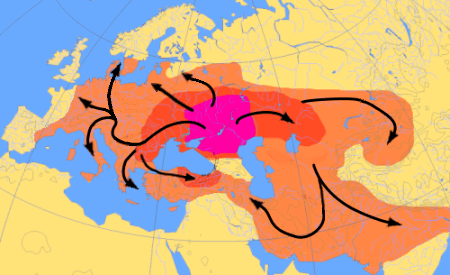
Scheme of Indo-European migrations from c. 4000 to 1000 BCE according to the Kurgan hypothesis. The magenta area corresponds to the assumed Urheimat (Samara culture, Sredny Stog culture). The red area corresponds to the area which may have been settled by Indo-European-speaking peoples up to c. 2500 BCE; the orange area to 1000 BCE. (Christopher I. Beckwith (2009), Empires of the Silk Road, Oxford University Press, p.30)

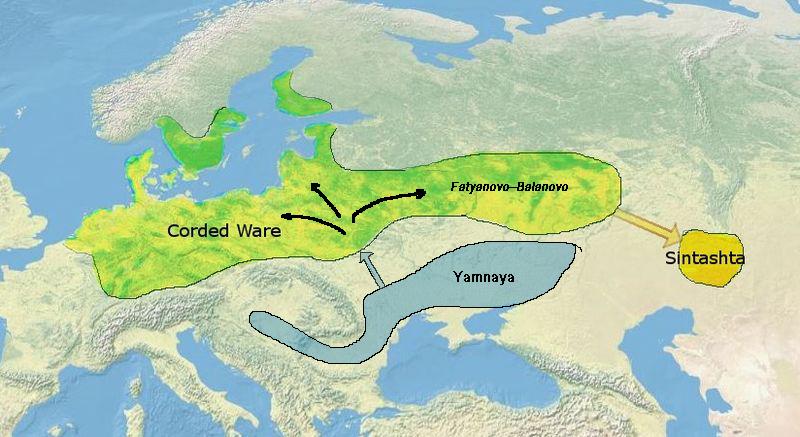
According to Allentoft (2015), the Sintashta culture probably derived from the Corded Ware Culture.

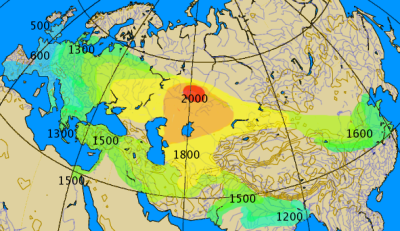
Historical spread of the chariot. Dates given in image are approximate BCE years.

Spread of IE-languages

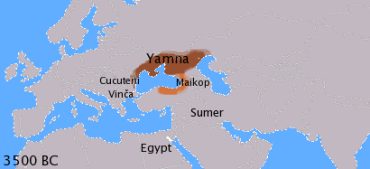
Indo-European languages c. 3500 BC

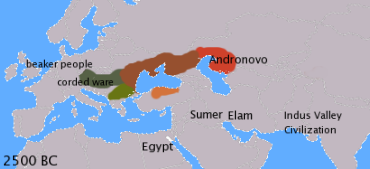
Indo-European languages c. 2500 BC

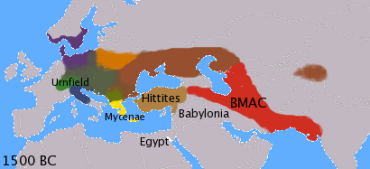
Indo-European languages c. 1500 BC

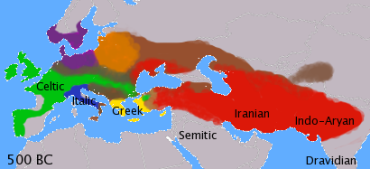
Indo-European languages c. 500 BC

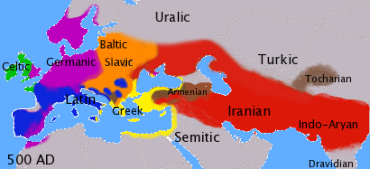
Indo-European languages c. 500 AD

The Sintashta, Andronovo, Bactria-Margiana and Yaz cultures have been associated with Indo-Iranian migrations in Central Asia. The Gandhara Grave, Cemetery H, Copper Hoard and Painted Grey Ware cultures are candidates for subsequent cultures within South Asia associated with Indo-Aryan movements. The decline of the Indus Valley Civilisation predates the Indo-Aryan migrations, but archeological data show a cultural continuity in the archeological record. Together with the presence of Dravidian loanwords in the Rigveda, this argues in favor of an interaction between post-Harappan and Indo-Aryan cultures.

=== Stages of migrations ===
About 6,000 years ago the Indo-Europeans started to spread out from their proto-Indo-European homeland in Central Eurasia, between the southern Ural Mountains, the North Caucasus, and the Black Sea. About 4,000 years ago Indo-European speaking peoples started to migrate out of the Eurasian steppes. (Note: Steppe herders, archaic Proto-Indo-European speakers, spread into the lower Danube valley as early as 4200–4000 BCE, either causing or taking advantage of the collapse of Old Europe.)

==== Diffusion from the "Urheimat" ====
Scholars regard the middle Volga, which was the location of the Samara culture (late 6th and early 5th millennium BCE), and the Yamna culture, to be the "Urheimat" of the Indo-Europeans, as described by the Kurgan hypothesis. From this "Urheimat", Indo-European languages spread throughout the Eurasian steppes between c. 4,500 and 2,500 BCE, forming the Yamna culture.

==== Sequence of migrations ====
David Anthony gives an elaborate overview of the sequence of migrations.

The oldest attested Indo-European language is Hittite, which belongs to the oldest written Indo-European languages, the Anatolian branch. Although the Hittites are placed in the 2nd millennium BCE, the Anatolian branch seems to predate Proto-Indo-European, and may have developed from an older Pre-Proto-Indo-European ancestor. If it separated from Proto-Indo-European, it is likely to have done so between 4500 and 3500 BCE.

A migration of archaic Proto-Indo-European speaking steppe herders into the lower Danube valley took place about 4200–4000 BCE, either causing or taking advantage of the collapse of Old Europe.

According to Mallory and Adams, migrations southward founded the Maykop culture (c. 3500–2500 BCE), and eastward the Afanasevo culture (c. 3500–2500 BCE), which developed into the Tocharians (c. 3700–3300 BCE).

According to Anthony, between 3100 and 2800/2600 BCE, a real folk migration of Proto-Indo-European speakers from the Yamna-culture took place toward the west, into the Danube Valley. These migrations probably split off Pre-Italic, Pre-Celtic and Pre-Germanic from Proto-Indo-European. According to Anthony, this was followed by a movement north, which split away Baltic-Slavic c. 2800 BCE. Pre-Armenian split off at the same time. According to Parpola, this migration is related to the appearance of Indo-European speakers from Europe in Anatolia, and the appearance of Hittite.

The Corded Ware culture in Middle Europe ( 2900–2450/2350 cal. BCE), has been associated with some of the languages in the Indo-European family. According to Haak et al. (2015) a massive migration took place from the Eurasian steppes to Central Europe.

Yamna culture

This migration is closely associated with the Corded Ware culture. (Note: Mac-Planck Gesellschaft, A massive migration from the steppe brought Indo-European languages to Europe) (Note: Ewen Callaway (12 February 2015), European languages linked to migration from the east. Large ancient-DNA study uncovers population that moved westwards 4,500 years ago., Nature)

The Indo-Iranian language and culture emerged in the Sintashta culture (c. 2050–1900 BCE), where the chariot was invented. Allentoft et al. (2015) found close autosomal genetic relationship between peoples of Corded Ware culture and Sintashta culture, which "suggests similar genetic sources of the two", and may imply that "the Sintashta derives directly from an eastward migration of Corded Ware peoples".

The Indo-Iranian language and culture was further developed in the Andronovo culture (c. 2000–1450 BCE), and influenced by the Bactria–Margiana Archaeological Complex (c. 2250–1700 BCE). The Indo-Aryans split off sometime around 2000–1600 BCE from the Iranians, after which Indo-Aryan groups are thought to have moved to the Levant (Mitanni), the northern Indian subcontinent (Vedic people, c. 1500 BCE), and China (Wusun). Thereafter the Iranians migrated into Iran.

=== Central Asia: formation of Indo-Iranians ===
Indo-Iranian peoples are a grouping of ethnic groups consisting of the Indo-Aryan, Iranian and Nuristani peoples; that is, speakers of Indo-Iranian languages.

The Proto-Indo-Iranians are commonly identified with the Andronovo culture, that flourished c. 2000–1450 BCE in an area of the Eurasian Steppe that borders the Ural River on the west, the Tian Shan on the east. The older Sintashta culture (2200–1900), formerly included within the Andronovo culture, is now considered separately, but regarded as its predecessor, and accepted as part of the wider Andronovo horizon.

The Indo-Aryan migration was part of the Indo-Iranian migrations from the Andronovo culture into Anatolia, Iran and South Asia.

==== Sintashta-Petrovka culture ====
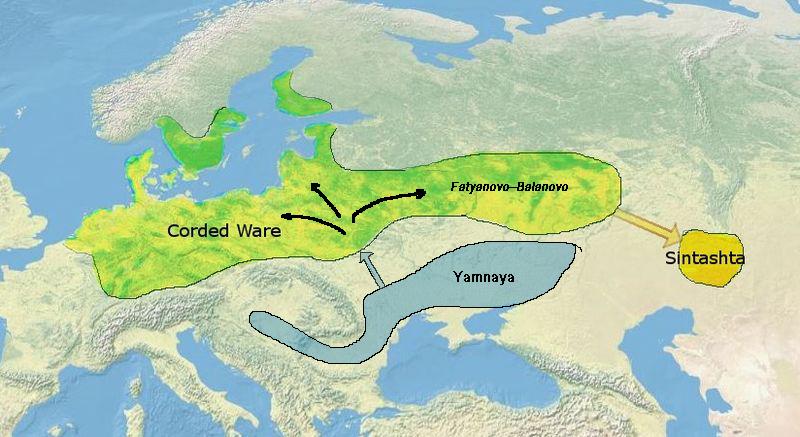
According to Allentoft (2015), the Sintashta culture probably derived from the Corded Ware Culture.

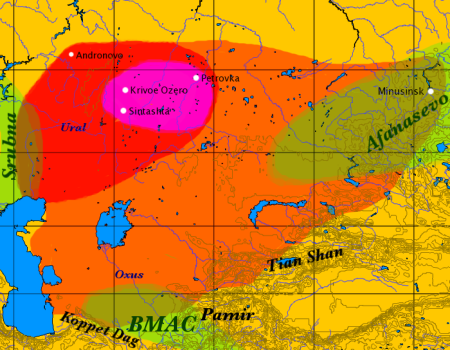
Map of the approximate maximal extent of the Andronovo culture. The formative Sintashta-Petrovka culture is shown in darker red. The location of the earliest spoke-wheeled chariot finds is indicated in purple. Adjacent and overlapping cultures (Afanasevo, Srubna and Bactria-Margiana cultures) are shown in green.

The Sintashta culture, also known as the Sintashta-Petrovka culture or Sintashta-Arkaim culture, is a Bronze Age archaeological culture of the northern Eurasian Steppe on the borders of Eastern Europe and Central Asia, dated to the period 2200–1900 BCE. The Sintashta culture is probably the archaeological manifestation of the Indo-Iranian language group.

The Sintashta culture emerged from the interaction of two antecedent cultures. Its immediate predecessor in the Ural-Tobol steppe was the Poltavka culture, an offshoot of the cattle-herding Yamnaya horizon that moved east into the region between 2800 and 2600 BCE. Several Sintashta towns were built over older Poltovka settlements or close to Poltovka cemeteries, and Poltovka motifs are common on Sintashta pottery. Sintashta material culture also shows the influence of the late Abashevo culture, a collection of Corded Ware settlements in the forest steppe zone north of the Sintashta region that were also predominantly pastoralist. Allentoft et al. (2015) also found close autosomal genetic relationship between peoples of Corded Ware culture and Sintashta culture.

The earliest known chariots have been found in Sintashta burials, and the culture is considered a strong candidate for the origin of the technology, which spread throughout the Old World and played an important role in ancient warfare. Sintashta settlements are also remarkable for the intensity of copper mining and bronze metallurgy carried out there, which is unusual for a steppe culture.

Because of the difficulty of identifying the remains of Sintashta sites beneath those of later settlements, the culture was only recently distinguished from the Andronovo culture. It is now recognised as a separate entity forming part of the 'Andronovo horizon'.

==== Andronovo culture ====
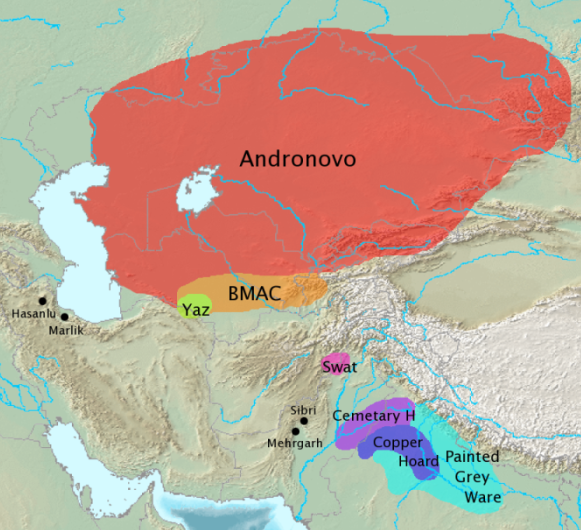
Archaeological cultures associated with Indo-Iranian migrations and Indo-Aryan migrations (after EIEC). The Andronovo, BMAC and Yaz cultures have often been associated with Indo-Iranian migrations. The GGC, Cemetery H, Copper Hoard and PGW cultures are candidates for cultures associated with Indo-Aryan migrations.

The Andronovo culture is a collection of similar local Bronze Age Indo-Iranian cultures that flourished c. 2000–1450 BC in western Siberia and the central Eurasian Steppe. It is probably better termed an archaeological complex or archaeological horizon. The name derives from the village of Andronovo (55°53′N 55°42′E), where in 1914, several graves were discovered, with skeletons in crouched positions, buried with richly decorated pottery. The older Sintashta culture (2050–1900 BCE), formerly included within the Andronovo culture, is now considered separately, but regarded as its predecessor, and accepted as part of the wider Andronovo horizon.

Currently only two sub-cultures are considered as part of Andronovo culture:

- Alakul (2000–1700 BC) between Oxus (today Amu Darya), and Jaxartes, Kyzylkum desert
- Fëdorovo (2000–1450 BC) in southern Siberia (earliest evidence of cremation and fire cult)

Other authors identified previously the following sub-cultures also as part of Andronovo:

- Eastern Fedorovo (1750–1500 BC) in Tian Shan mountains (Northwestern Xinjiang, China), southeastern Kazakhstan, eastern Kyrgyzstan
- Alekseyevka (1200–1000 BC) "final Bronze Age phase" in eastern Kazakhstan, contacts with Namazga VI in Turkmenia

The geographical extent of the culture is vast and difficult to delineate exactly. On its western fringes, it overlaps with the approximately contemporaneous, but distinct, Srubna culture in the Volga–Ural interfluvial. To the east, it reaches into the Minusinsk depression, with some sites as far west as the southern Ural Mountains, overlapping with the area of the earlier Afanasevo culture. Additional sites are scattered as far south as the Kopet Dag (Turkmenistan), the Pamir (Tajikistan) and the Tian Shan (Kyrgyzstan). The northern boundary vaguely corresponds to the beginning of the Taiga. In the Volga basin, interaction with the Srubna culture was the most intense and prolonged, and Federovo style pottery is found as far west as Volgograd.

Towards the middle of the 2nd millennium, the Andronovo cultures begin to move intensively eastwards. They mined deposits of copper ore in the Altai Mountains and lived in villages of as many as ten sunken log cabin houses measuring up to 30m by 60m in size. Burials were made in stone cists or stone enclosures with buried timber chambers.

In other respects, the economy was pastoral, based on cattle, horses, sheep, and goats. While agricultural use has been posited, no clear evidence has been presented.

Studies associate the Andronovo horizon with early Indo-Iranian languages, though it may have overlapped the early Uralic-speaking area at its northern fringe, including the Turkic-speaking area at its northeastern fringe.

Based on its use by Indo-Aryans in Mitanni and Vedic India, its prior absence in the Near East and Harappan India, and its 19–20th century BCE attestation at the Andronovo site of Sintashta, Kuz'mina (1994) argues that the chariot corroborates the identification of Andronovo as Indo-Iranian. (Note: Klejn (1974), as cited in Bryant 2001, p. 206, acknowledges the Iranian identification of the Andronovo-culture, but finds the Andronovo culture too late for an Indo-Iranian identification, giving a later date for the start of the Andronovo-culture "in the 16th or 17th century BC, whereas the Aryans appeared in the Near East not later than the 15th to 16th century BCE. Klejn (1974, p.58) further argues that "these [latter] regions contain nothing reminiscent of Timber-Frame Andronovo materials." Brentjes (1981) also gives a later dating for the Andronovo-culture. Bryant further refers to Lyonnet (1993) and Francfort (1989), who point to the absence of archaeological remains of the Andronovians south of the Hindu Kush. Bosch-Gimpera (1973) and Hiebert (1998) argue that there also no Andronovo-remains in Iran, but Hiebert "agrees that the expansion of the BMAC people to the Iranian plateau and the Indus Valley borderlands at the beginning of the second millennium BCE is 'the best candidate for an archaeological correlate of the introduction of Indo-Iranian speakers to Iran and South Asia' (Hiebert 1995:192)". Sarianidi states that the Andronovo-tribes "penetrated to a minimum extent".) Anthony & Vinogradov (1995) dated a chariot burial at Krivoye Lake to about 2000 BCE and a Bactria-Margiana burial that also contains a foal has recently been found, indicating further links with the steppes.

Mallory acknowledges the difficulties of making a case for expansions from Andronovo to northern India, and that attempts to link the Indo-Aryans to such sites as the Beshkent and Vakhsh cultures "only gets the Indo-Iranian to Central Asia, but not as far as the seats of the Medes, Persians or Indo-Aryans". He has developed the "kulturkugel" model that has the Indo-Iranians taking over Bactria-Margiana cultural traits but preserving their language and religion while moving into Iran and India. Fred Hiebert also agrees that an expansion of the BMAC into Iran and the margin of the Indus Valley is "the best candidate for an archaeological correlate of the introduction of Indo-Iranian speakers to Iran and South Asia." According to Narasimhan et al. (2018), the expansion of the Andronovo culture towards the BMAC took place via the Inner Asia Mountain Corridor.

==== Bactria-Margiana culture ====
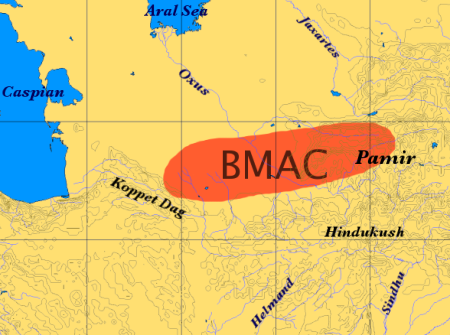
The extent of the Bactria-Margiana Culture (after EIEC)

The Bactria-Margiana Culture, also called "Bactria-Margiana Archaeological Complex", was a non-Indo-European culture which influenced the Indo-Iranians. It was centered in what is nowadays northwestern Afghanistan and southern Turkmenistan. Proto-Indo-Iranian arose due to this influence.

The Indo-Iranians also borrowed their distinctive religious beliefs and practices from this culture. According to Anthony, the Old Indic religion probably emerged among Indo-European immigrants in the contact zone between the Zeravshan River (present-day Uzbekistan) and (present-day) Iran. It was "a syncretic mixture of old Central Asian and new Indo-European elements", which borrowed "distinctive religious beliefs and practices" from the Bactria–Margiana culture. At least 383 non-Indo-European words were borrowed from this culture, including the god Indra and the ritual drink Soma.

The characteristically Bactria-Margiana (southern Turkmenistan/northern Afghanistan) artifacts found at burials in Mehrgarh and Balochistan are explained by a movement of peoples from Central Asia to the south. The Indo-Aryan tribes may have been present in the area of the BMAC from 1700 BCE at the latest (incidentally corresponding with the decline of that culture).

From the BMAC, the Indo-Aryans moved into the Indian subcontinent. According to Bryant, the Bactria-Margiana material inventory of the Mehrgarh and Baluchistan burials is "evidence of an archaeological intrusion into the subcontinent from Central Asia during the commonly accepted time frame for the arrival of the Indo-Aryans". (Note: Nevertheless, archaeologists like B.B. Lal have seriously questioned the Bactria-Margiana and Indo-Iranian "connections", and thoroughly disputed all the proclaimed relations.)

==== Multiple waves of migration into northern India ====
Indus Valley Civilization, Late Phase (1900-1300 BCE). Cemetery H and Copper Hoard are associated with early Indo-Aryan migrations.

According to Parpola, Indo-Aryan clans migrated into South Asia in subsequent waves. This explains the diversity of views found in the Rig Veda, and may also explain the existence of various Indo-Aryan cultural complexes in the later Vedic period, namely the Vedic culture centered on the Kuru kingdom in the heartland of Aryavarta in the western Ganges plain, and the cultural complex of Greater Magadha at the eastern Ganges plain, which gave rise to Jainism and Buddhism.

Writing in 1998, Parpola postulated a first wave of immigration from as early as 1900 BCE, corresponding to the Cemetery H culture and the Copper Hoard culture, c.q. Ochre Coloured Pottery culture, and an immigration to the Punjab . 1700–1400 BCE. (Note: However, this culture may also represent forerunners of the Indo-Iranians, similar to the Lullubi and Kassite invasion of Mesopotamia early in the second millennium BCE.) In 2020, Parpola proposed an even earlier wave of proto-Indo-Iranian speaking people from the Sintashta culture into India at c. 1900 BCE, related to the Copper Hoard Culture, followed by a pre-Rig Vedic Indo-Aryan wave of migration:

It seems, then, that the earliest Aryan-speaking immigrants to South Asia, the Copper Hoard people, came with bull-drawn carts (Sanauli and Daimabad) via the BMAC and had Proto-Indo-Iranian as their language. They were, however, soon followed (and probably at least partially absorbed) by early Indo-Aryans.

This pre-Rig-Vedic wave of migration by early Indo-Aryans is associated by Parpola with "the early (Ghalegay IV–V) phase of the Gandhara Grave culture" and the Atharva Veda tradition, and related to the Petrovka culture. The Rig-Vedic wave followed several centuries later, "perhaps in the fourteenth century BCE", and is associated by Parpola with the Fedorovo culture.

According to Kochhar there were three waves of Indo-Aryan immigration that occurred after the mature Harappan phase:

1. the "Murghamu" (Bactria-Margiana culture) related people who entered Balochistan at Pirak, Mehrgarh south cemetery, and other places, and later merged with the post-urban Harappans during the late Harappans Jhukar phase (2000–1800 BCE);
2. the Swat IV that co-founded the Harappan Cemetery H phase in Punjab (2000–1800 BCE);
3. and the Rigvedic Indo-Aryans of Swat V that later absorbed the Cemetery H people and gave rise to the Painted Grey Ware culture (PGW) (to 1400 BCE).

===== Gandhara grave culture and Ochre Coloured Pottery culture =====
The standard model for the entry of the Indo-European languages into India is that Indo-Aryan migrants went over the Hindu Kush, forming the Gandhara grave culture or Swat culture, in present-day Swat valley, into the headwaters of either the Indus or the Ganges (probably both). The Gandhara grave culture, which emerged c. 1600 BCE and flourished from c. 1500 BCE to 500 BCE in Gandhara, modern-day Pakistan and Afghanistan, is thus the most likely locus of the earliest bearers of Rigvedic culture. About 1800 BCE, there is a major cultural change in the Swat Valley with the emergence of the Gandhara grave culture. With its introduction of new ceramics, new burial rites, and the horse, the Gandhara grave culture is a major candidate for early Indo-Aryan presence. The two new burial rites—flexed inhumation in a pit and cremation burial in an urn—were, according to early Vedic literature, both practiced in early Indo-Aryan society. Horse-trappings indicate the importance of the horse to the economy of the Gandharan grave culture. Two horse burials indicate the importance of the horse in other respects. Horse burial is a custom that Gandharan grave culture has in common with Andronovo, though not within the distinctive timber-frame graves of the steppe.

Parpola (2020) states:

The dramatic new discovery of cart burials dated to c. 1900 at Sinauli have been reviewed in this paper, and they support my proposal of a pre-Ṛvedic wave (now set of waves) of Aryan speakers arriving in South Asia and their making contact with the Late Harappans.

=== Two waves of Indo-Iranian migration ===
The Indo-Iranian migrations took place in two waves, belonging to the second and the third stage of Beckwith's description of the Indo-European migrations. The first wave consisted of the Indo-Aryan migration into the Levant, seemingly founding the Mitanni kingdom in northern Syria (c. 1600–1350 BCE), and the migration south-eastward of the Vedic people, over the Hindu Kush into northern India. Christopher I. Beckwith suggests that the Wusun, an Indo-European Europoid people of Inner Asia in antiquity, were also of Indo-Aryan origin. The second wave is interpreted as the Iranian wave.

=== First wave – Indo-Aryan migrations ===
==== Mittani ====
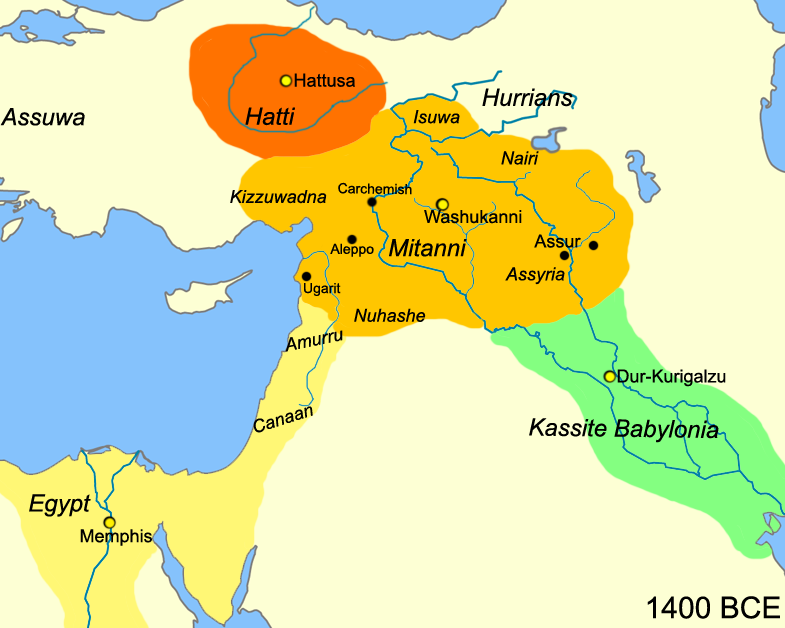
Map of the Near East c. 1400 BCE showing the Kingdom of Mitanni at its greatest extent

Mitanni (Hittite cuneiform KUR^{URU}Mi-ta-an-ni), also Mittani (Mi-it-ta-ni) or Hanigalbat (Assyrian Hanigalbat, Khanigalbat cuneiform Ḫa-ni-gal-bat) or Naharin in ancient Egyptian texts was a Hurrian-speaking state in northern Syria and south-east Anatolia from c. 1600 BCE – 1350 BCE.

According to one hypothesis, founded by an Indo-Aryan ruling class governing a predominately Hurrian population, Mitanni came to be a regional power after the Hittite destruction of Amorite Babylon and a series of ineffectual Assyrian kings created a power vacuum in Mesopotamia. At the beginning of its history, Mitanni's major rival was Egypt under the Thutmosids. However, with the ascent of the Hittite empire, Mitanni and Egypt made an alliance to protect their mutual interests from the threat of Hittite domination.

At the height of its power, during the 14th century BCE, Mitanni had outposts centered on its capital, Washukanni, whose location has been determined by archaeologists to be on the headwaters of the Khabur River. Their sphere of influence is shown in Hurrian place names, personal names and the spread through Syria and the Levant of a distinct pottery type. Eventually, Mitanni succumbed to Hittite and later Assyrian attacks, and was reduced to the status of a province of the Middle Assyrian Empire.

The earliest written evidence for an Indo-Aryan language is found not in Northwestern India and Pakistan, but in northern Syria, the location of the Mitanni kingdom. The Mitanni kings took Old Indic throne names, and Old Indic technical terms were used for horse-riding and chariot-driving. The Old Indic term r'ta, meaning "cosmic order and truth", the central concept of the Rigveda, was also employed in the Mitanni kingdom. Old Indic gods, including Indra, were also known in the Mitanni kingdom.

==== North-India – Vedic culture ====
Spread of Vedic culture

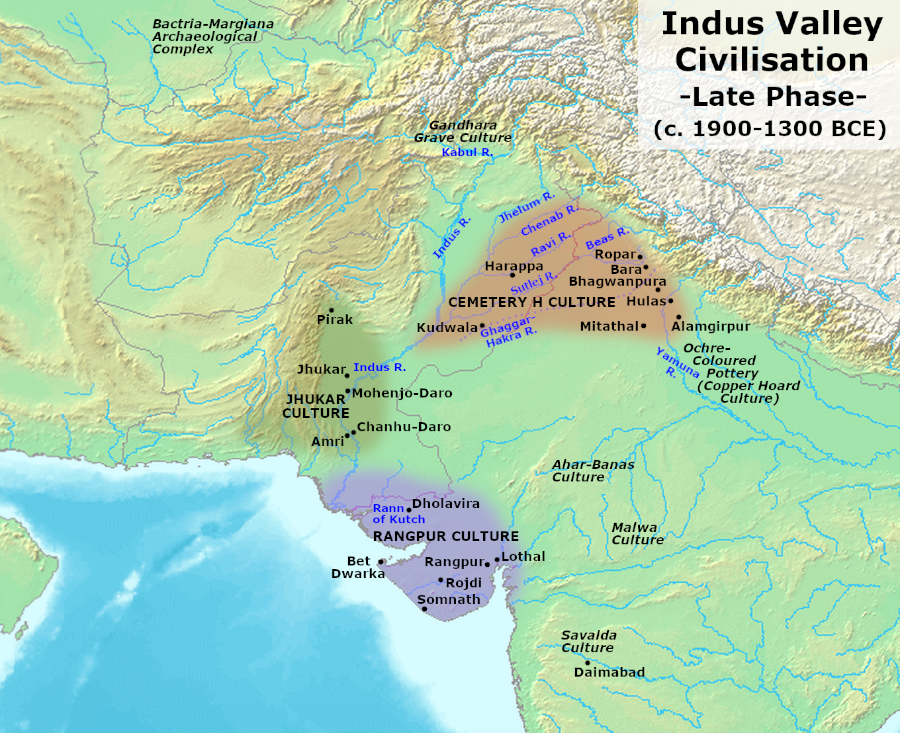
Late Harappan phase.

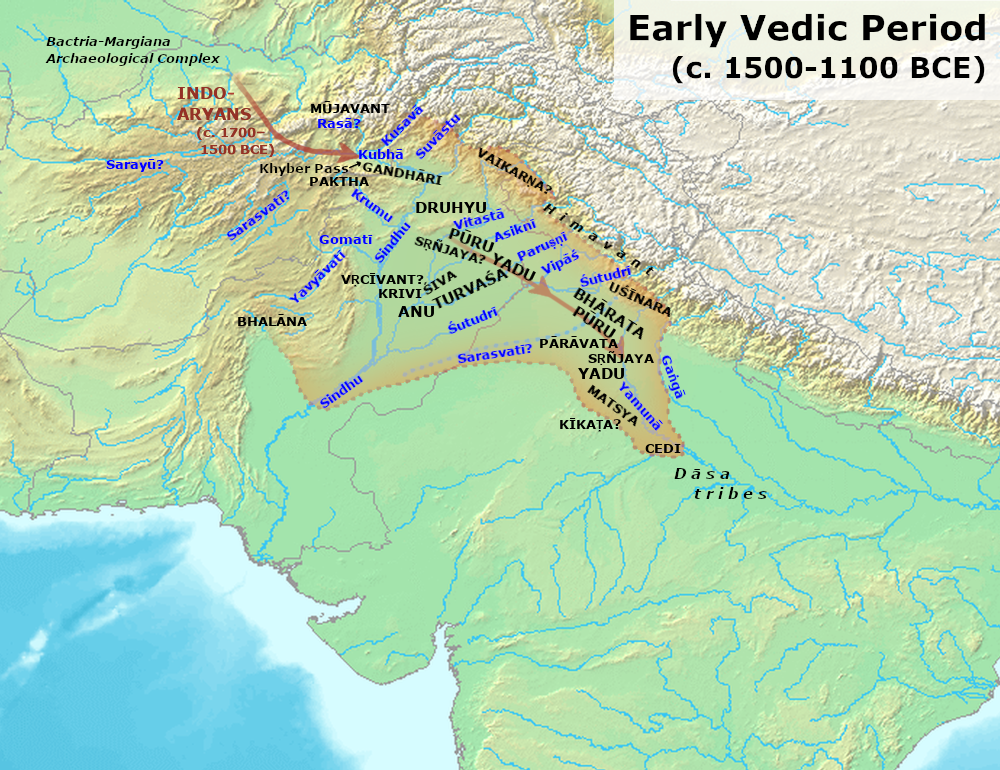
Early Vedic Period.

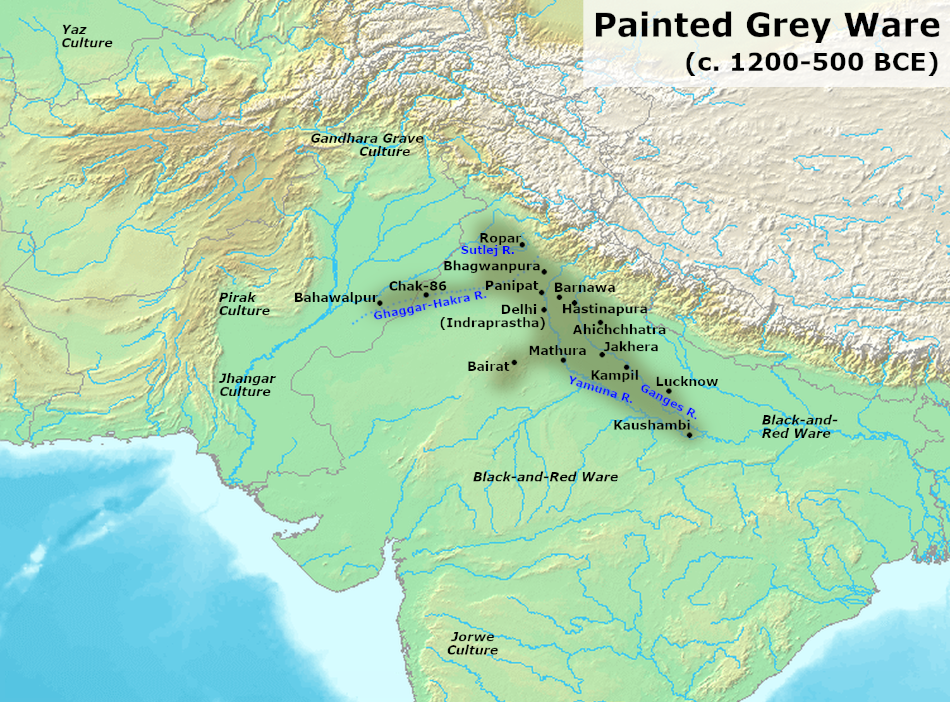
Painted Grey Ware culture (1200–600 BCE)

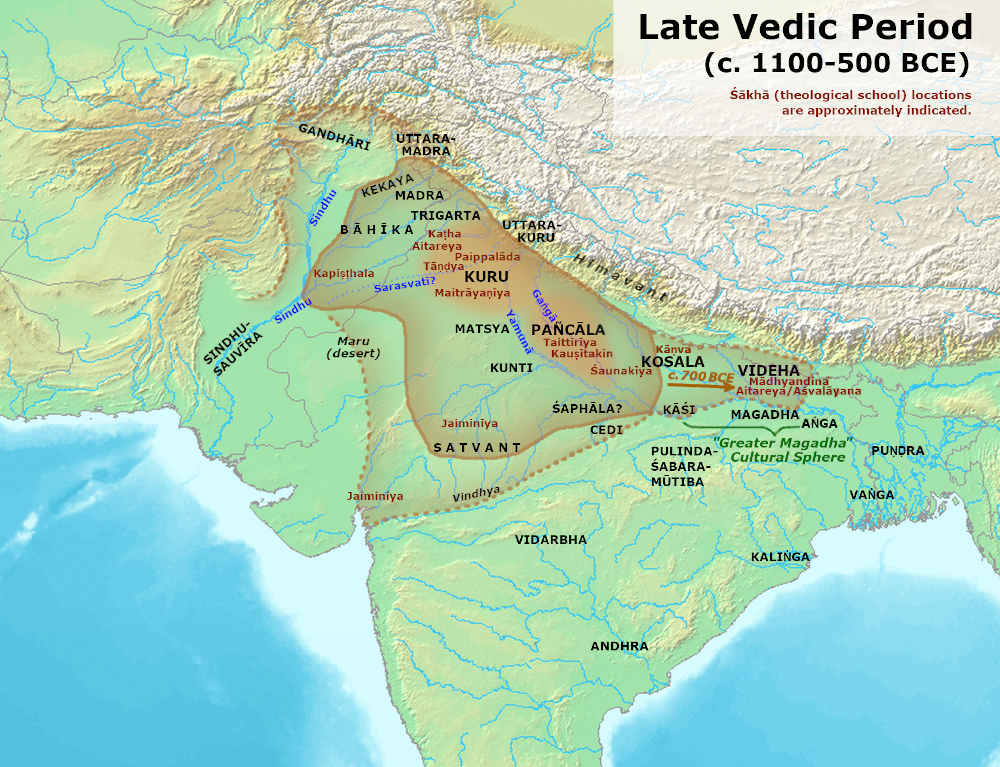
Kingdoms, tribes and theological schools of the Late Vedic Period.

===== Spread of Vedic-Brahmanic culture =====
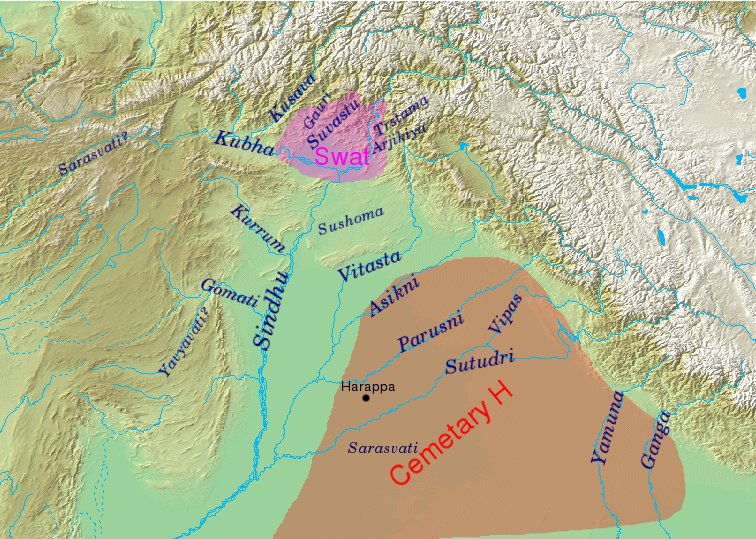
Geography of the Rigveda, with river names; the extent of the Swat and Cemetery H cultures are indicated.

During the Early Vedic Period (c. 1500–800 BCE (Note: Frank Raymon Allchin, Early Vedic Period, Encyclopædia Britannica)) the Indo-Aryan culture was centered in the northern Punjab, or Sapta Sindhu. During the Later Vedic Period (c. 800–500 BCE (Note: Joseph E. Scwartzberg, Later Vedic period (c. 800–c. 500 bce), Encyclopædia Britannica)) the Indo-Aryan culture started to extend into the western Ganges Plain, centering on the Vedic Kuru and Panchala area, and had some influence at the central Ganges Plain after 500 BCE. (Note: R. Champakalakshmi, The beginning of the historical period, c. 500–150 bce, Encyclopædia Britannica) Sixteen Mahajanapada developed at the Ganges Plain, of which the Kuru and Panchala became the most notable developed centers of Vedic culture, at the western Ganges Plain.

The Central Ganges Plain, where Magadha gained prominence, forming the base of the Maurya Empire, was a distinct cultural area, with new states arising after 500 BCE during the so-called "Second urbanisation". (Note: The "First urbanisation" was the Indus Valley Civilisation.) It was influenced by the Vedic culture, but differed markedly from the Kuru-Panchala region. It "was the area of the earliest known cultivation of rice in the Indian subcontinent and by 1800 BCE was the location of an advanced neolithic population associated with the sites of Chirand and Chechar". In this region the Shramanic movements flourished, and Jainism and Buddhism originated.

==== Indus Valley Civilization ====
The Indo-Aryan migration into the northern Punjab started shortly after the decline of the Indus Valley civilisation (IVC). According to the "Aryan Invasion Theory" this decline was caused by "invasions" of barbaric and violent Aryans who conquered the IVC. This "Aryan Invasion Theory" is not supported by the archeological and genetic data, and is not representative of the "Indo-Aryan migration theory".

===== Decline of Indus Valley Civilisation =====
The decline of the IVC from about 1900 BCE started before the onset of the Indo-Aryan migrations, caused by aridisation due to shifting monsoons. A regional cultural discontinuity occurred during the second millennium BCE and many Indus Valley cities were abandoned during this period, while many new settlements began to appear in Gujarat and East Punjab and other settlements such as in the western Bahawalpur region increased in size.

Jim G. Shaffer and Lichtenstein contend that in the second millennium BCE considerable "location processes" took place. In the eastern Punjab 79.9% and in Gujarat 96% of sites changed settlement status. According to Shaffer & Lichtenstein,

It is evident that a major geographic population shift accompanied this 2nd millennium BCE localisation process. This shift by Harappan and, perhaps, other Indus Valley cultural mosaic groups, is the only archaeologically documented west-to-east movement of human populations in the Indian subcontinent before the first half of the first millennium BC

===== Continuity of Indus Valley civilization =====
In 1995, and based on a set of cranial and dental comparisons, Erdosy suggested the ancient Harappans were not markedly different from modern populations in Northwestern India and present-day Pakistan. Craniometric data showed similarity with prehistoric peoples of the Iranian plateau and Western Asia, (Note: Comparing the Harappan and Gandhara cultures, Kennedy states: "Our multivariate approach does not define the biological identity of an ancient Aryan population, but it does indicate that the Indus Valley and Gandhara peoples shared a number of craniometric, odontometric and discrete traits that point to a high degree of biological affinity." Kennedy in Erdosy 1995, p. 49) although Mohenjo-daro was distinct from the other areas of the Indus Valley. (Note: Kennedy: "Have Aryans been identified in the prehistoric skeletal record from South Asia? Biological anthropology and concepts of ancient races", in Erdosy 1995 at p. 49.) (Note: Cephalic measures, however, may not be a good indicator as they do not necessarily indicate ethnicity and they might vary in different environments. On the use of which, however, see)

In 1995, Kennedy, had found no evidence of "demographic disruptions" immediately after the decline of the Harappa culture. (Note: Kennedy: "there is no evidence of demographic disruptions in the north-western sector of the Subcontinent during and immediately after the decline of the Harappan culture. If Vedic Aryans were a biological entity represented by the skeletons from Timargarha, then their biological features of cranial and dental anatomy were not distinct to a marked degree from what we encountered in the ancient Harappans." Kennedy in Erdosy 1995, p. 54) Kenoyer notes that no biological evidence can be found for major new populations in post-Harappan communities. (Note: Kenoyer: "there was an overlap between Late Harappan and post-Harappan communities ... with no biological evidence for major new populations." Kenoyer as quoted in Bryant 2001, p. 231) Hemphill notes that "patterns of phonetic affinity" between Bactria and the Indus Valley Civilisation are best explained by "a pattern of long-standing, but low-level bidirectional mutual exchange". (Note: Hemphill: "the data provide no support for any model of massive migration and gene flow between the oases of Bactria and the Indus Valley. Rather, patterns of phonetic affinity best conform to a pattern of long-standing, but low-level bidirectional mutual exchange. Hemphill (1998). "Biological Affinities and Adaptations of Bronze Age Bactrians: III. An initial craniometric assessment". American Journal of Physical Anthropology. 106 (3): 329–348. doi:10.1002/(sici)1096-8644(199807)106:3<329::aid-ajpa6>3.0.co;2-h. PMID 9696149.; Hemphill (1999). "Biological Affinities and Adaptations of Bronze Age Bactrians: III. A Craniometric Investigation of Bactrian Origins". American Journal of Physical Anthropology. 108 (2): 173–192. doi:10.1002/(sici)1096-8644(199902)108:2<173::aid-ajpa4>3.0.co;2-3. PMID 9988380.)

According to Kennedy, the Cemetery H culture "shows clear biological affinities" with the earlier population of Harappa. The archaeologist Kenoyer noted that this culture "may only reflect a change in the focus of settlement organization from that which was the pattern of the earlier Harappan phase and not cultural discontinuity, urban decay, invading aliens, or site abandonment, all of which have been suggested in the past." Recent excavations in 2008 at Alamgirpur, Meerut District, appeared to show an overlap between the Harappan and Painted Grey Ware culture (PGW) pottery indicating cultural continuity.

===== Relation with Indo-Aryan migrations =====
According to Kenoyer, the decline of the Indus Valley Civilisation is not explained by Aryan migrations, (Note: Kenoyer: "Although the overall socioeconomic organization changed, continuities in technology, subsistence practices, settlement organization, and some regional symbols show that the indigenous population was not displaced by invading hordes of Indo-Aryan speaking people. For many years, the 'invasions' or 'migrations' of these Indo-Aryan-speaking Vedic/Aryan tribes explained the decline of the Indus civilization and the sudden rise of urbanization in the Ganges-Yamuna valley. This was based on simplistic models of culture change and an uncritical reading of Vedic texts...",) which took place after the decline of the Indus Valley Civilisation. Yet, according to Erdosy,

Evidence in material culture for systems collapse, abandonment of old beliefs and large-scale, if localised, population shifts in response to ecological catastrophe in the 2nd millennium BC must all now be related to the spread of Indo-Aryan languages.

Erdosy, testing hypotheses derived from linguistic evidence against hypotheses derived from archaeological data, states that there is no evidence of "invasions by a barbaric race enjoying technological and military superiority", but "some support was found in the archaeological record for small-scale migrations from Central Asia to the Indian subcontinent in the late 3rd/early 2nd millennia BCE". According to Erdosy, the postulated movements within Central Asia can be placed within a processional framework, replacing simplistic concepts of "diffusion", "migrations" and "invasions".

Scholars have argued that the historical Vedic culture is the result of an amalgamation of the immigrating Indo-Aryans with the remnants of the indigenous civilization, such as the Ochre Coloured Pottery culture.

==== Inner Asia – Wusun and Yuezhi ====
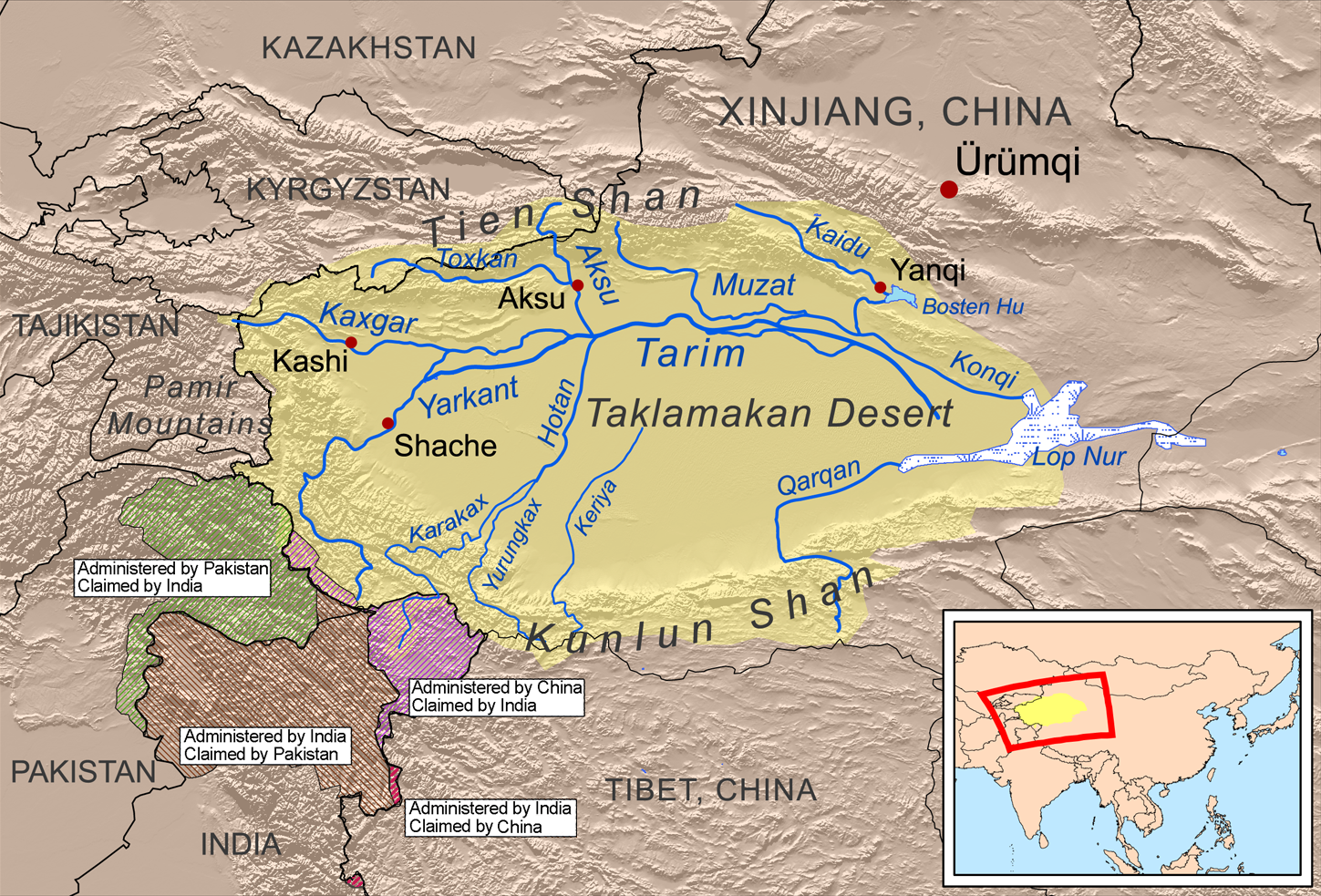
The Tarim Basin, 2008

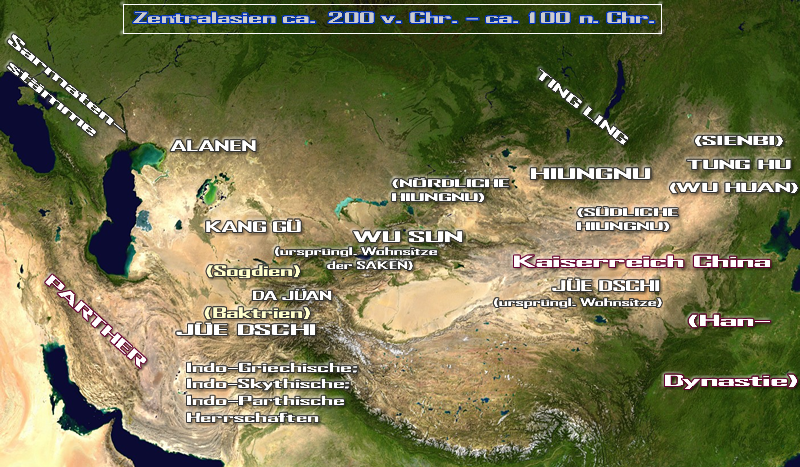
Wusun and their neighbours during the late 2nd century BCE. The Yancai did not change their name to Alans until the 1st century.

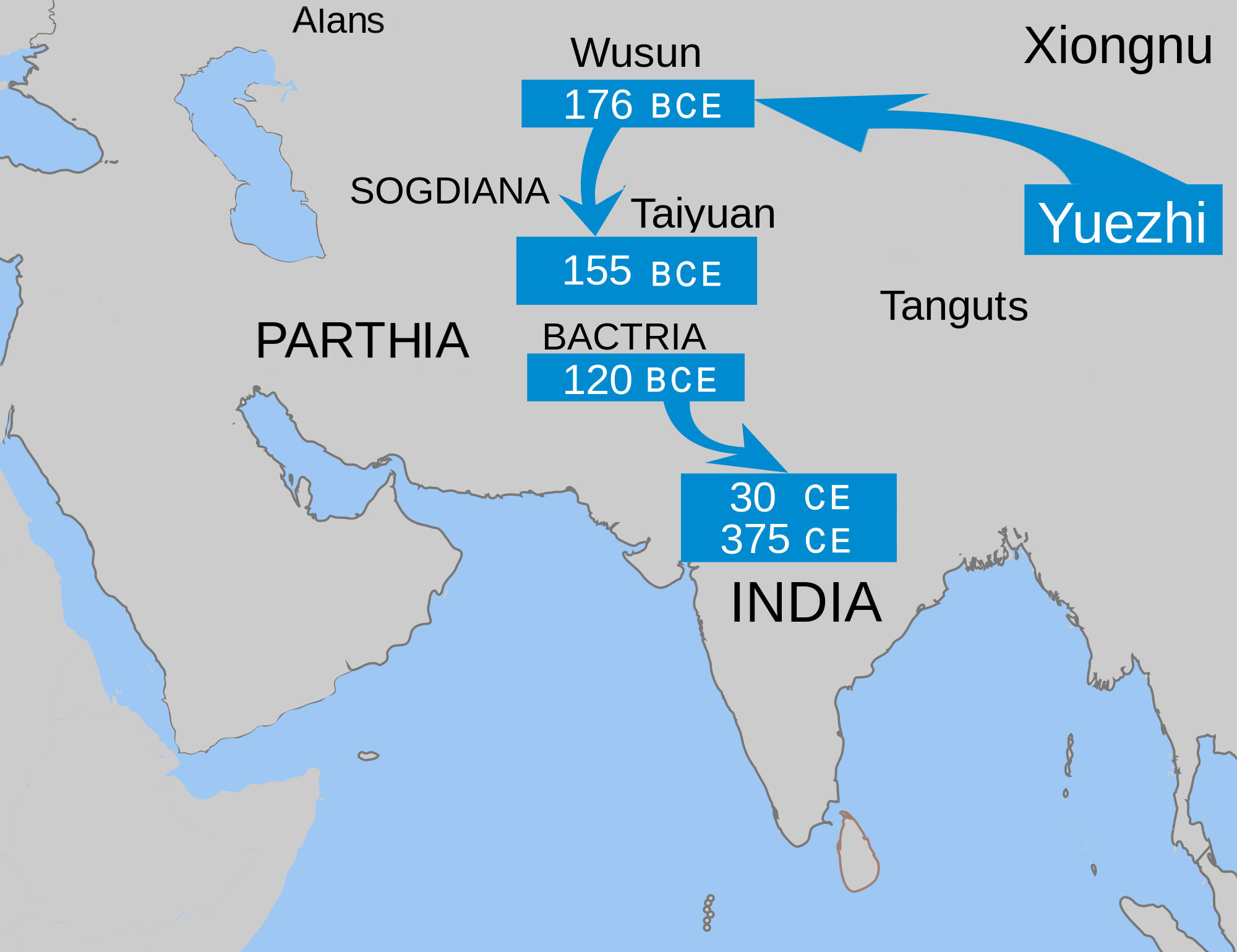
The migrations of the Yuezhi through Central Asia, from around 176 BCE to 30 CE

According to Christopher I. Beckwith, the Wusun people of Inner Asia in antiquity, who he describes as being "markedly Europoid in appearance", could've had Indo-Aryan origins. From the Chinese term Wusun, Beckwith reconstructs the Old Chinese *âswin, which he compares to the Old Indic aśvin "the horsemen", the name of the Rigvedic twin equestrian gods. Beckwith suggests that the Wusun were an eastern remnant of the Indo-Aryans, who had been suddenly pushed to the extremeties of the Eurasian Steppe by the Iranian peoples in the 2nd millennium BCE.

The Wusun are first mentioned by Chinese sources as vassals in the Tarim Basin of the Yuezhi, another Indo-European Caucasian people of possible Tocharian stock. Around 175 BCE, the Yuezhi were utterly defeated by the Xiongnu, also former vassals of the Yuezhi. The Yuezhi subsequently attacked the Wusun and killed their king (Kunmo Chinese: 昆莫 or Kunmi Chinese: 昆彌) Nandoumi (Chinese: 難兜靡), capturing the Ili Valley from the Saka (Scythians) shortly afterwards. In return the Wusun settled in the former territories of the Yuezhi as vassals of the Xiongnu.

The son of Nandoumi was adopted by the Xiongnu king and made leader of the Wusun. Around 130 BCE he attacked and utterly defeated the Yuezhi, settling the Wusun in the Ili Valley. After the Yuezhi were defeated by the Xiongnu, in the 2nd century BCE, a small group, known as the Little Yuezhi, fled to the south, while the majority migrated west to the Ili Valley, where they displaced the Sakas (Scythians). Driven from the Ili Valley shortly afterwards by the Wusun, the Yuezhi migrated to Sogdia and then Bactria, where they are often identified with the Tókharoi (Τοχάριοι) and Asii of Classical sources. They then expanded into northern Indian subcontinent, where one branch of the Yuezhi founded the Kushan Empire. The Kushan empire stretched from Turpan in the Tarim Basin to Pataliputra on the Indo-Gangetic Plain at its greatest extent, and played an important role in the development of the Silk Road and the transmission of Buddhism to China.

Soon after 130 BCE the Wusun became independent of the Xiongnu, becoming trusted vassals of the Han dynasty and powerful force in the region for centuries. With the emerging steppe federations of the Rouran, the Wusun migrated into the Pamir Mountains in the 5th century CE. They are last mentioned in 938 when a Wusun chieftain paid tribute to the Liao dynasty.

=== Second wave – Iranians ===
The first Iranians to reach the Black Sea may have been the Cimmerians in the 8th century BCE, although their linguistic affiliation is uncertain. They were followed by the Scythians, who would dominate the area, at their height, from the Carpathian Mountains in the west, to the easternmost fringes of Central Asia in the east. For most of their existence, the Scythians were based in what is modern-day Ukraine and southern European Russia. Sarmatian tribes, of whom the best known are the Roxolani (Rhoxolani), Iazyges (Jazyges) and the Alans, followed the Scythians westwards into Europe in the late centuries BCE and the 1st and 2nd centuries of the Common Era (The Migration Period). The populous Sarmatian tribe of the Massagetae, dwelling near the Caspian Sea, were known to the early rulers of Persia in the Achaemenid Period. In the east, the Scythians occupied several areas in Xinjiang, from Khotan to Tumshuq.

The Medes, Parthians and Persians begin to appear on the western Iranian Plateau from c. 800 BCE, after which they remained under Assyrian rule for several centuries, as it was with the rest of the peoples in the Near East. The Achaemenids replaced Median rule from 559 BCE. Around the first millennium of the Common Era (AD), the Kambojas, the Pashtuns and the Baloch began to settle on the eastern edge of the Iranian Plateau, on the mountainous frontier of northwestern and western Pakistan, displacing the earlier Indo-Aryans from the area.

In Central Asia, the Turkic languages have marginalized Iranian languages as a result of the Turkic migration of the early centuries CE. In Eastern Europe, Slavic and Germanic peoples assimilated and absorbed the native Iranian languages (Scythian and Sarmatian) of the region. Extant major Iranian languages are Persian, Pashto, Kurdish, and Balochi, besides numerous smaller ones.

== Anthropology: elite recruitment and language shift ==
=== Elite dominance ===
Small groups can change a larger cultural area, and elite male dominance by small groups may have led to a language shift in northern India. (Note: Basu et al. (2003) refer to Renfrew (1992), Archaeology, genetics and linguistic diversity, stating: "Renfrew (1992) has suggested that the elite dominance model, which envisages the intrusion of a relatively small but well-organized group that takes over an existing system by the use of force, may be appropriate to explain the distribution of the IE languages in north India and Pakistan." Anthony explains that small elite groups may effect significant social changes because their social organisation allows for the recruitment of new members via patronage-systems, which may be attractive for outsiders.) Thapar notes that Indo-Aryan chiefs may have provided protection to non-Aryan agriculturalists, offering a system of patronage placing the chiefs in a superior position. This would have involved bilingualism, resulting in the adoption of Indo-Aryan languages by local populations. According to Parpola, local elites joined "small but powerful groups" of Indo-European speaking migrants. These migrants had an attractive social system and good weapons, and luxury goods which marked their status and power. Joining these groups was attractive for local leaders, since it strengthened their position, and gave them additional advantages. These new members were further incorporated by matrimonial alliances. Genetic studies, on modern South Asian populations, show a disproportionate presence of Steppe ancestry within the elite, Indo-Aryan scripture keeping, Brahmin castes, supporting the elite dominance hypothesis.

=== Renfrew: models of "linguistic replacement" ===
Basu et al. refer to Renfrew, who described four models for "linguistic replacement":

1. The demographic-subsistence model, exemplified by the process of agricultural dispersal, in which the incoming group has exploitive technologies which makes them dominant. It may lead to significant gene flow, and significant genetic changes in the population. But it may also lead to acculturalisation, in which case the technologies are taken over, but there is less change in the genetic composition of the population;
2. The existence of extended trading systems which led to the development of a lingua franca, in which case some gene flow is to be expected;
3. The elite dominance model, in which "a relatively small but well-organized group [...] take[s] over the system". Given the small size of the elite, its genetic influence may also be small, though "preferential access to marriage partners" may result in a relatively strong influence on the gene pool. Sexual asymmetry may also be of influence: incoming elites often consist mostly of males, who have no influence on the mitochondrial DNA of the gene pool, but may influence the Y chromosomes of the gene pool;
4. System collapse, in which territorial boundaries are changed, and elite dominance may appear for a while.

=== David Anthony: elite recruitment ===
David Anthony, in his "revised Steppe hypothesis" notes that the spread of the Indo-European languages probably did not happen through "chain-type folk migrations", but by the introduction of these languages by ritual and political elites, which are emulated by large groups of people. (Note: Compare the process of Sanskritization in India.) Anthony gives the example of the Southern Luo-speaking Acholi in northern Uganda in the 17th and 18th century, whose language spread rapidly in the 19th century. Anthony notes that "Indo-European languages probably spread in a similar way among the tribal societies of prehistoric Europe", carried forward by "Indo-European chiefs" and their "ideology of political clientage". Anthony notes that "elite recruitment" may be a suitable term for this system. (Note: Another example Anthony gives of how an open social system can encourage recruitment and language shift, are the Pathans in western Afghanistan. Traditionally status depended on agricultural surpluses and landownership. The neighbouring Baluch, outnumbered by the Pathans, were pastoral herders, and has hierarchical political system. Pathans who lost their land, could take refuge among the Baluch. As Anthony notes, "chronic tribal warfare might generally favor pastoralism over sedentary economics as herds can be defended by moving them, whereas agricultural fields are an immobile target.")

=== Michael Witzel: small groups and acculturation ===
Michael Witzel refers to Ehret's model (Note: Michael Witzel: Ehret, Ch., 1988. "Language Change and the Material Correlates of Language and Ethnic Shift," Antiquity, 62: 564–74; derived from Africa, cf. Diakonoff 1985.) "which stresses the osmosis, or a 'billiard ball', or Mallory's Kulturkugel, effect of cultural transmission". According to Ehret, ethnicity and language can shift with relative ease in small societies, due to the cultural, economic and military choices made by the local population in question. The group bringing new traits may initially be small, contributing features that can be fewer in number than those of the already local culture. The emerging combined group may then initiate a recurrent, expansionist process of ethnic and language shift.

Witzel notes that "arya/ārya does not mean a particular 'people' or even a particular 'racial' group but all those who had joined the tribes speaking Vedic Sanskrit and adhering to their cultural norms (such as ritual, poetry, etc.)." According to Witzel, "there must have been a long period of acculturation between the local population and the 'original' immigrants speaking Indo-Aryan." Witzel also notes that the speakers of Indo-Aryan and the local population must have been bilingual, speaking each other's languages and interacting with each other, before the Rg Veda was composed in the Punjab.

=== Salmons: systematic changes in community structure ===
Joseph Salmons notes that Anthony presents scarce concrete evidence or arguments. Salmons is critical about the notion of "prestige" as a central factor in the shift to Indo-European languages, referring to Milroy who notes that "prestige" is "a cover term for a variety of very distinct notions". Instead, Milroy offers "arguments built around network structure", though Salmons also notes that Anthony includes several of those arguments, "including political and technological advantages". According to Salmons, the best model is offered by Fishman, (Note: Joshua Fisfman (1991), Reversing language shift) who

... understands shift in terms of geographical, social, and cultural "dislocation" of language communities. Social dislocation, to give the most relevant example, involves "siphoning off the talented, the enterprising, the imaginative and the creative" ([Fishman] 1991: 61), and sounds strikingly like Anthony's 'recruitment' scenario.

Salmons himself argues that

... systematic changes in community structure are what drive language shift, incorporating Milroy's network structures as well. The heart of the view is the quintessential element of modernization, namely a shift from local community-internal organization to regional (state or national or international, in modern settings), extra-community organizations. Shift correlates with this move from pre-dominantly "horizontal" community structures to more "vertical" ones.

== Genetics: ancient ancestry and multiple gene flows ==
India has one of the most genetically diverse populations in the world, and the history of this genetic diversity is the topic of continued research and debate. The Indo-Aryan migrations form part of a complex genetical puzzle on the origin and spread of the various components of the Indian population, including various waves of admixture and language shift. The genetic impact of the Indo-Aryans may have been marginal, but this is not at odds with the cultural and linguistic influence, since language shift is possible without a change in genetics.

=== Ancestral groups ===
==== Common maternal ancestry ====
Sahoo et al. 2006 states that "there is general agreement that Indian caste and tribal populations share a common late Pleistocene maternal ancestry in India."

Kivisild et al. 1999 concluded that there is "an extensive deep late Pleistocene genetic link between contemporary Europeans and Indians" via the mitochondrial DNA, that is, DNA which is inherited from the mother. According to them, the two groups split at the time of the peopling of Asia and Eurasia and before modern humans entered Europe. Kivisild et al. (2000) note that "the sum of any recent (the last 15,000 years) western mtDNA gene flow to India comprises, in average, less than 10 percent of the contemporary Indian mtDNA lineages."

Kivisild et al. 2003 and Sharma et al. 2005 note that north and south Indians share a common maternal ancestry: Kivisild et al. (2003) further note that "these results show that Indian tribal and caste populations derive largely from the same genetic heritage of Pleistocene southern and western Asians and have received limited gene flow from external regions since the Holocene.

==== "Ancestral North Indians" and "Ancestral South Indians" ====
Reich et al. 2009, in a collaborative effort between the Harvard Medical School and the Centre for Cellular and Molecular Biology (CCMB), examined the entire genomes worth 560,000 single nucleotide polymorphisms (SNPs), as compared to 420 SNPs in prior work. They also cross-compared them with the genomes of other regions available in the global genome database. Through this study, they were able to discern two genetic groups in the majority of populations in India, which they called "Ancestral North Indians" (ANI) and "Ancestral South Indians" (ASI). (Note: Reich et al. 2009 excluded the Austro-Asiatic and Tibeto-Burman speakers from their analysis in order to avoid interference.) They found that the ANI genes are close to those of Middle Easterners, Central Asians and Europeans whereas the ASI genes are dissimilar to all other known populations outside India, though the indigenous Andamanese were determined to be the most closely related to the ASI population of any living group (albeit distinct from the ASI). (Note: Reich et al. 2009: "We analyze 25 diverse groups to provide strong evidence for two ancient populations, genetically divergent, that are ancestral to most Indians today. One, the "Ancestral North Indians" (ANI), is genetically close to Middle Easterners, Central Asians, and Europeans, while the other, the "Ancestral South Indians" (ASI), is as distinct from ANI and East Asians as they are from each other.") (Note: Moorjani et al. 2013: "Most Indian groups descend from a mixture of two genetically divergent populations: Ancestral North Indians (ANI) related to Central Asians, Middle Easterners, Caucasians, and Europeans; and Ancestral South Indians (ASI) not closely related to groups outside the subcontinent.") These two distinct groups, which had split ca. 50,000 years ago, formed the basis for the present population of India. (Note: Elie Dolgin (2009), Indian ancestry revealed. The mixing of two distinct lineages led to most modern-day Indians, Nature News)

The two groups mixed between 1,900 and 4,200 years ago (2200 BCE – 100 CE), where-after a shift to endogamy took place and admixture became rare. (Note: Moorjani et al. 2013: "We report genome-wide data from 73 groups from the Indian subcontinent and analyze linkage disequilibrium to estimate ANI-ASI mixture dates ranging from about 1,900 to 4,200 years ago. In a subset of groups, 100% of the mixture is consistent with having occurred during this period. These results show that India experienced a demographic transformation several thousand years ago, from a region in which major population mixture was common to one in which mixture even between closely related groups became rare because of a shift to endogamy.") Speaking to Fountain Ink, David Reich stated, "Prior to 4,200 years ago, there were unmixed groups in India. Sometime between 1,900 to 4,200 years ago, profound, pervasive convulsive mixture occurred, affecting every Indo-European and Dravidian group in India without exception." Reich pointed out that their work does not show that a substantial migration occurred during this time. (Note: Srinath Perur (December 2013), The origins of Indians. What our genes are telling us., Fountain Ink)

Metspalu et al. 2011, representing a collaboration between the Estonian Biocenter and CCMB, confirmed that the Indian populations are characterized by two major ancestry components. One of them is spread at comparable frequency and haplotype diversity in populations of South and West Asia and the Caucasus. The second component is more restricted to South Asia and accounts for more than 50% of the ancestry in Indian populations. Haplotype diversity associated with these South Asian ancestry components is significantly higher than that of the components dominating the West Eurasian ancestry palette.

Segurel et al. (2020) notes the -13910*T Lactase persistence mutation, found in present-day South Asia, first appeared approximately 3,960 BCE, in Ukraine, and spread between 2,000 and 1,500 BCE throughout Eurasia. Earlier Tandon et al. (1981) had studied the distribution of lactase toleration in North and South Indians. Romero et al.(2011) later plotting a decreasing North West to South East Indian cline for the mutations frequency.

==== Additional components ====
Kumar et al. 2015 discern three major ancestry components, which they call "Southwest Asian", "Southeast Asian" and "Northeast Asian". The Southwest Asian component seems to be a native Indian component, while the Southeast Asian component is related to East Asian populations. Brahmin populations "contained 11.4 and 10.6% of Northern Eurasian and Mediterranean components, thereby suggesting a shared ancestry with the Europeans". They note that this fits with earlier studies which "suggested similar shared ancestries with Europeans and Mediterraneans". They further note that

Studies based on uni-parental marker have shown diverse Y-chromosomal haplogroups making up the Indian gene pool. Many of these Y-chromosomal markers show a strong correlation to the linguistic affiliation of the population. The genome-wide variation of the Indian samples in the present study correlated with the linguistic affiliation of the sample.

They conclude that, while there may have been an ancient settlement in the subcontinent, "male-dominated genetic elements shap[ed] the Indian gene pool", and that these elements "have earlier been correlated to various languages", and further note "the fluidity of female gene pools when in a patriarchal and patrilocal society, such as that of India".

Basu et al. 2016 extend the study of Reich et al. 2009 by postulating two other populations in addition to the ANI and ASI: "Ancestral Austro-Asiatic" (AAA) and "Ancestral Tibeto-Burman" (ATB), corresponding to the Austroasiatic and Tibeto-Burman language speakers. According to them, ancestral populations seem to have occupied geographically separated habitats. The ASI and the AAA were early settlers, who possibly arrived via the southern wave out of Africa. The ANI are related to Central South Asians and entered India through the northwest, while the ATB are related to East Asians and entered India through northeast corridors. They further note that

The asymmetry of admixture, with ANI populations providing genomic inputs to tribal populations (AA, Dravidian tribe, and TB) but not vice versa, is consistent with elite dominance and patriarchy. Males from dominant populations, possibly upper castes, with high ANI component, mated outside of their caste, but their offspring were not allowed to be inducted into the caste. This phenomenon has been previously observed as asymmetry in homogeneity of mtDNA and heterogeneity of Y-chromosomal haplotypes in tribal populations of India as well as the African Americans in United States.

==== Male-mediated migration ====
Reich et al. (2009), citing Kivisild et al. 1999, indicate that there has been a low influx of female genetic material since 50,000 years ago, but a "male gene flow from groups with more ANI relatedness into ones with less". (Note: Reich et al.: "The stronger gradient in males, replicating previous reports, could reflect either male gene flow from groups with more ANI relatedness into ones with less, or female gene flow in the reverse direction. However, extensive female gene flow in India would be expected to homogenize ANI ancestry on the autosomes just as in mtDNA, which we do not observe. Supporting the view of little female ANI ancestry in India, Kivisild et al. reported that mtDNA 'haplogroup U' splits into two deep clades. 'U2i' accounts for 77% of copies in India but ~0% in Europe, and 'U2e' accounts for 0% of all copies in India but ~10% in Europe. The split is ~50,000 years old, indicating low female gene flow between Europe and India since that time.")

Kumar et al. 2015 "suggest that ancient male-mediated migratory events and settlement in various regional niches led to the present day scenario and peopling of India."

Mahl (2021), in a study of the Brahmin ethnic group, identified the ancient male protagonists of the sampled population could be traced to twelve geographic locations, eleven of which were outside South Asia. Of the Y-DNA haplogroups identified, four were carried by ~83% of those sampled, and of these four, two were of Central Asian origin and one of the Fertile Crescent. All sampled groups were admixed with populations of South Asian origin.

=== North-south cline ===
According to Metspalu et al. 2011 there is "a general principal component cline stretching from Europe to south India". This northwest component is shared with populations from the Middle East, Europe and Central Asia, and is thought to represent at least one ancient influx of people from the northwest. According to Saraswathy et al. (2010), there is "a major genetic contribution from Eurasia to North Indian upper castes" and a "greater genetic inflow among North Indian caste populations than is observed among South Indian caste and tribal populations". According to Basu et al. 2003, the upper castes generally display stronger affinities to Central Asians, though those from northern India are closer than those from southern India.

=== Scenarios ===
While Reich notes that the onset of admixture coincides with the arrival of Indo-European language, (Note: David reich: "This mystery of how Indo-Europeans spread over such a vast region and what the historical underpinnings of it would have been is ongoing and remains a mystery. The fact that these languages are in India has led to the hypothesis that they came in from somewhere else, from the north, from the west, and that perhaps maybe this would be a vector for the movement of these people. Another reason that people think that is that when you have languages coming in, not always but usually, they're brought by large movements of people. Hungarian is an exception. The Hungarians are mostly not descended from the people who brought Hungarian to Hungary. In general, languages typically tend to follow large movements of people. On the other hand, once agriculture is established, as it has been for 5000 to 8000 years in India, it's very hard for a group to make a dent on it. The British didn't make any demographic dent on India even though they politically ruled it for a couple of hundred years. It's a mystery how this occurred, and it remains a mystery. What we know is that the likely timing of this event is probably around 3000 to 4000 years ago. The timing of the arrival of Indo-European language corresponds to the timing of the mixture event.) according to Metspalu (2011), the commonalities of the ANI with European genes cannot be explained by the influx of Indo-Aryans at ca. 3,500 BP alone. They state that the split of ASI and ANI predates the Indo-Aryan migration, both of these ancestry components being older than 3,500 BP." Moorjani (2013) states that "We have further shown that groups with unmixed ANI and ASI ancestry were plausibly living in India until this time." Moorjani (2013) describes three scenarios regarding the bringing together of the two groups:

1. "migrations that occurred prior to the development of agriculture [8,000–9,000 years before present (BP)]. Evidence for this comes from mitochondrial DNA studies, which have shown that the mitochondrial haplogroups (hg U2, U7, and W) that are most closely shared between Indians and West Eurasians diverged about 30,000–40,000 years BP."
2. "Western Asian peoples migrated to India along with the spread of agriculture [...] Any such agriculture related migrations would probably have begun at least 8,000–9,000 years BP (based on the dates for Mehrgarh) and may have continued into the period of the Indus civilization that began around 4,600 years BP and depended upon West Asian crops."
3. "migrations from Western or Central Asia from 3,000 to 4,000 years BP, a time during which it is likely that Indo-European languages began to be spoken in the subcontinent. A difficulty with this theory, however, is that by this time India was a densely populated region with widespread agriculture, so the number of migrants of West Eurasian ancestry must have been extraordinarily large to explain the fact that today about half the ancestry in India derives from the ANI."

==== Pre-agricultural migrations ====
Metspalu et al. (2011) detected a genetic component in India, k5, which "distributed across the Indus Valley, Central Asia, and the Caucasus". According to Metspalu et al. (2011), k5 "might represent the genetic vestige of the ANI", though they also note that the geographic cline of this component within India "is very weak, which is unexpected under the ASI-ANI model", explaining that the ASI-ANI model implies an ANI contribution which decreases toward southern India. According to Metspalu et al. (2011), "regardless of where this component was from (the Caucasus, Near East, Indus Valley, or Central Asia), its spread to other regions must have occurred well before our detection limits at 12,500 years." Speaking to Fountain Ink, Metspalu said, "the West Eurasian component in Indians appears to come from a population that diverged genetically from people actually living in Eurasia, and this separation happened at least 12,500 years ago." (Note: Note that according to Jones et al. (2015), Caucasian Hunter Gatherers and "the ancestors of Neolithic farmers" split circa 25,000 years ago: "Caucasus hunter-gatherers (CHG) belong to a distinct ancient clade that split from western hunter-gatherers ~45 kya, shortly after the expansion of anatomically modern humans into Europe and from the ancestors of Neolithic farmers ~25 kya, around the Last Glacial Maximum. CHG genomes significantly contributed to the Yamnaya steppe herders who migrated into Europe B3,000 BC, supporting a formative Caucasus influence on this important Early Bronze age culture.") Moorjani et al. (2013) refer to Metspalu (2011) (Note: The reference is to a "recent study", and gives Kivisild et al. (1999). Kivisild (1999) does not mention the number 12,500, nor does it explicitly make such a statement. What it does state is that western-Eurasian and Indian mtDNA lineages overlap in haplogroup U; that the split between the western-Eurasian and Indian U2 lineages appeared circa 53,000 ± 4,000 years before present; and that "despite their equally deep time depth, the Indian U2 has not penetrated western Eurasia, and the European U5 has almost not reached India." They further note that wester-Eurasian mtDNA lineages did spread in India at the time of the spread of agricultural crops from the fertile Crescent. Metspalu et al. (2011) do refer to 12,500 years ago. Apparently, the reference to Kivisld (1999) is incorrect, and was not noticed by the authors.) as "fail[ing] to find any evidence for shared ancestry between the ANI and groups in West Eurasia within the past 12,500 years". CCMB researcher Thangaraj believes that "it was much longer ago", and that "the ANI came to India in a second wave of migration (Note: After the initial settlement of India by the ASI.) that happened perhaps 40,000 years ago."

Narasimhan et al. 2019 conclude that ANI and ASI were formed in the 2nd millennium BCE. They were preceded by IVC-people, a mixture of AASI (ancient ancestral south Indians, that is, hunter-gatherers related), and people related to but distinct from Iranian agri-culturalists, lacking the Anatolian farmer-related ancestry which was common in Iranian farmers after 6000 BCE. (Note: Narasimhan et al.: "[One possibility is that] Iranian farmer–related ancestry in this group was characteristic of the Indus Valley hunter-gatherers in the same way as it was characteristic of northern Caucasus and Iranian plateau hunter-gatherers. The presence of such ancestry in hunter-gatherers from Belt and Hotu Caves in northeastern Iran increases the plausibility that this ancestry could have existed in hunter-gatherers farther east." Shinde et al. (2019) note that these Iranian people "had little if any genetic contribution from [...] western Iranian farmers or herders"; they split from each other more than 12,000 years ago. See also Razib Kkan, The Day of the Dasa: "...it may, in fact, be the case that ANI-like quasi-Iranians occupied northwest South Asia for a long time, and AHG populations hugged the southern and eastern fringes, during the height of the Pleistocene.") (Note: There was a rapid increase of the Caucasus Hunter-Gatherer-related south Caucasian population at the end of the Last Glacial Maximum, about 18,000 years ago, and Near East and Caucasus people probably also migrated to Europe during the Mesolithic, around 14,000 years ago.) Those Iranian farmers-related people may have arrived in India before the advent of farming in northern India, and mixed with people related to Indian hunter-gatherers ca. 5400 to 3700 BCE, before the advent of the mature IVC. (Note: Mascarenhas et al. (2015) note that "new, possibly West Asian, body types are reported from the graves of Mehrgarh beginning in the Togau phase (3800 BCE).") This mixed IVC-population, which probably was native to the Indus Valley Civilisation, "contributed in large proportions to both the ANI and ASI", which took shape during the 2nd millennium BCE. ANI formed out of a mixture of "Indus_Periphery-related groups" and migrants from the steppe, while ASI was formed out of "Indus_Periphery-related groups" who moved south and mixed with hunter-gatherers.

==== Agricultural migrations ====
===== Near-Eastern migrations =====
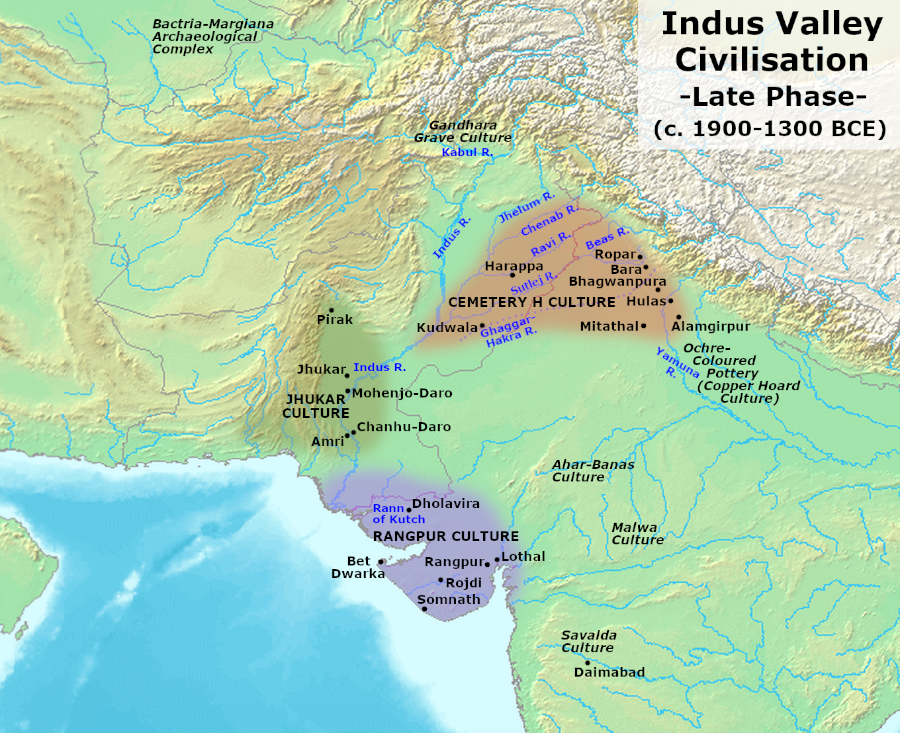
Late Harappan phase (1900–1300 BCE)

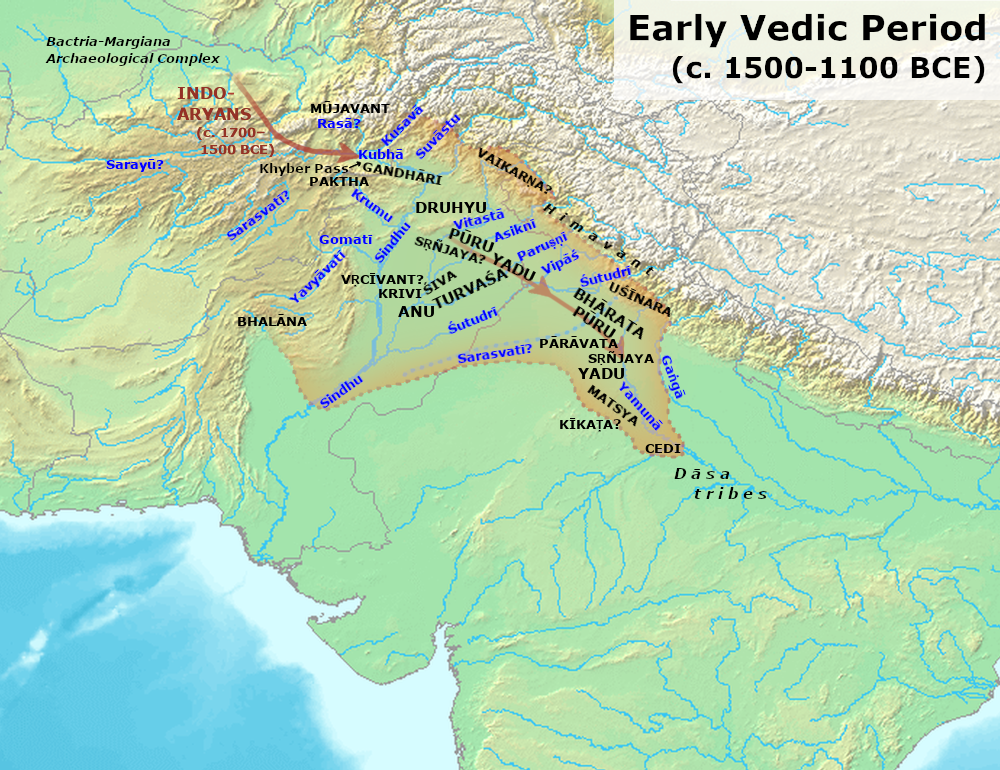
Early Vedic Culture (1700–1100 BCE)

Kivisild et al. 1999 note that "a small fraction of the 'Caucasoid-specific' mtDNA lineages found in Indian populations can be ascribed to a relatively recent admixture." at ca. 9,300 ± 3,000 years before present, which coincides with "the arrival to India of cereals domesticated in the fertile Crescent" and "lends credence to the suggested linguistic connection between Elamite and Dravidic populations".

According to Gallego Romero et al. (2011), their research on lactose tolerance in India suggests that "the west Eurasian genetic contribution identified by Reich et al. (2009) principally reflects gene flow from Iran and the Middle East." Gallego Romero notes that Indians who are lactose-tolerant show a genetic pattern regarding this tolerance which is "characteristic of the common European mutation". According to Gallego Romero, this suggests that "the most common lactose tolerance mutation made a two-way migration out of the Middle East less than 10,000 years ago. While the mutation spread across Europe, another explorer must have brought the mutation eastward to India – likely traveling along the coast of the Persian Gulf where other pockets of the same mutation have been found." In contrast, Allentoft et al. (2015) found that lactose-tolerance was absent in the Yamnaya culture, noting that while "the Yamnaya and these other Bronze Age cultures herded cattle, goats, and sheep, they couldn't digest raw milk as adults. Lactose tolerance was still rare among Europeans and Asians at the end of the Bronze Age, just 2000 years ago." (Note: Ann Gibbons (2015), Nomadic herders left a strong genetic mark on Europeans and Asians, Science)

According to Lazaridis et al. (2016), "farmers related to those from Iran spread northward into the Eurasian steppe; and people related to both the early farmers of Iran and to the pastoralists of the Eurasian steppe spread eastward into South Asia." They further note that ANI "can be modelled as a mix of ancestry related to both early farmers of western Iran and to people of the Bronze Age Eurasian steppe". (Note: See also eurogenes.blogspot, The genetic structure of the world's first farmers (Lazaridis et al. preprint) .)

===== Haplogroup R1a and related haplogroups =====
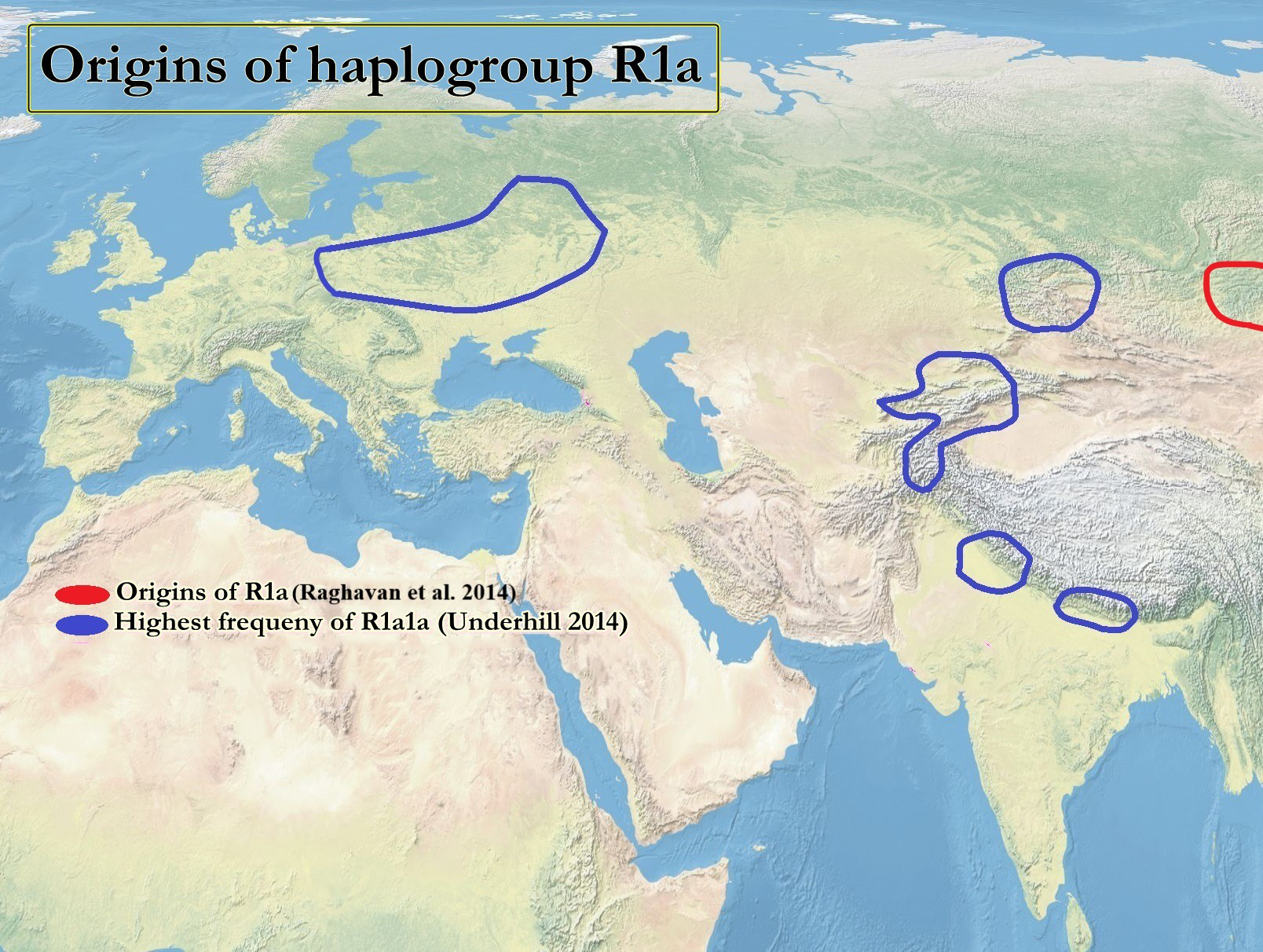
R1a origins (Underhill 2010); R1a migration to Eastern Europe; R1a1a diversification (Pamjav 2012); and R1a1a oldest expansion and highest frequency (Underhill 2014)

The distribution and proposed origin of haplogroup R1a, more specifically R1a1a1b, is often being used as an argument pro or contra the Indo-Aryan migrations. It is found in high frequencies in Eastern Europe (Z282) and south Asia (Z93), the areas of the Indo-European migrations. The place of origin of this haplogroup may give an indication of the "homeland" of the Indo-Europeans, and the direction of the first migrations.

Cordeaux et al. 2004, based on the spread of a cluster of haplogroups (J2, R1a, R2, and L) in India, with higher rates in northern India, argue that agriculture in south India spread with migrating agriculturalists, which also influenced the genepool in south India.

Sahoo et al. 2006, in response to Cordeaux et al. (2004), suggest that those haplogroups originated in India, based on the spread of these various haplogroups in India. According to Sahoo et al. (2006), this spread "argue[s] against any major influx, from regions north and west of India, of people associated either with the development of agriculture or the spread of the Indo-Aryan language family". They further propose that "the high incidence of R1* and R1a throughout Central Asian and East European populations (without R2 and R* in most cases) is more parsimoniously explained by gene flow in the opposite direction", which according to Sahoo et al. (2006) explains the "sharing of some Y-chromosomal haplogroups between Indian and Central Asian populations".

Sengupta et al. (2006) also comment on Cordeaux et al. (2004), stating that "the influence of Central Asia on the pre-existing gene pool was minor", and arguing for "a peninsular origin of Dravidian speakers than a source with proximity to the Indus and with significant genetic input resulting from demic diffusion associated with agriculture".

Sharma et al. (2009) found a high frequency of R1a1 in India. They therefore argue for an Indian origin of R1a1, and dispute "the origin of Indian higher most castes from Central Asian and Eurasian regions, supporting their origin within the Indian subcontinent".

Underhill et al. (2014/2015) conclude that R1a1a1, the most frequent subclade of R1a, split into Z282 (Europe) and Z93 (Asia) at circe 5,800 before present. According to Underhill et al. (2014/2015), "[t]his suggests the possibility that R1a lineages accompanied demic expansions initiated during the Copper, Bronze, and Iron ages." They further note that the diversification of Z93 and the "early urbanization within the Indus Valley also occurred at this time and the geographic distribution of R1a-M780 (Figure 3d) may reflect this".

Palanichamy et al. (2015), while responding to Cordeaux et al. (2004), Sahoo et al. (2006) and Sengupta et al. (2006), elaborated on Kivisild et al.'s (1999) suggestion that West Eurasian haplogroups "may have been spread by the early Neolithic migrations of proto-Dravidian farmers spreading from the eastern horn of the Fertile Crescent into India". They conclude that "the L1a lineage arrived from western Asia during the Neolithic period and perhaps was associated with the spread of the Dravidian language to India", indicating that "the Dravidian language originated outside India and may have been introduced by pastoralists coming from western Asia (Iran)." They further conclude that two subhalogroups originated with the Dravidian speaking peoples, and may have come to South India when the Dravidian language spread.

Poznik et al. (2016) note that "striking expansions" occurred within R1a-Z93 at ~4,500–4,000 years ago, which "predates by a few centuries the collapse of the Indus Valley Civilisation". Mascarenhas et al. (2015) note that the expansion of Z93 from Transcaucasia into South Asia is compatible with "the archeological records of eastward expansion of West Asian populations in the 4th millennium BCE culminating in the so-called Kura-Araxes migrations in the post-Uruk IV period".

==== Indo-European migrations ====
===== Genetic impact of Indo-Aryan migrations =====
Bamshad et al. 2001, Wells et al. (2002) and Basu et al. 2003 argue for an influx of Indo-European migrants into the Indian subcontinent, but not necessarily an "invasion of any kind". (Note: FOSA, Recent findings in Archeogenetics and the Aryan Migration Theory) Bamshad et al. 2001 notice that the correlation between caste-status and West Eurasian DNA may be explained by subsequent male immigration into the Indian subcontinent. Basu et al. 2003 argue that the Indian subcontinent was subjected to a series of Indo-European migrations about 1500 BCE.

Zerjal et al. (2002) argue that "multiple recent events" may have reshaped India's genetic landscape.

Metspalu et al. (2011) note that "any nonmarginal migration from Central Asia to South Asia should have also introduced readily apparent signals of East Asian ancestry into India" (although this presupposes the unproven assumption that East Asian ancestry was present – to a significant extent – in prehistorical Central Asia), which is not the case, and conclude that if there was a major migration of Eurasians into India, this happened before the rise of the Yamna culture. Based on Metspalu (2011), Lalji Singh, a co-author of Metspalu, concludes that "[t]here is no genetic evidence that Indo-Aryans invaded or migrated to India". (Note: India Today, Indians are not descendants of Aryans, says new study) (Note: dnaindia.com, New research debunks Aryan invasion theory) (Note: ITBL, Aryan Invasion Theory used for Divide and Convert: Exposed by fresh Genetic research) (Note: Metspalu et al (2011): "However, any nonmarginal migration from Central Asia to the Indian subcontinent should have also introduced readily apparent signals of East Asian ancestry into India (see Figure 2B). Because this ancestry component is absent from the region, we have to conclude that if such a dispersal event nevertheless took place, it occurred before the East Asian ancestry component reached Central Asia. The demographic history of Central Asia is, however, complex, and although it has been shown that demic diffusion coupled with influx of Turkic speakers during historical times has shaped the genetic makeup of Uzbeks75 [...] it is not clear what was the extent of East Asian ancestry in Central Asian populations prior to these events. See also Dinesh C. Sharma (2011), "Indians are not descendants of Aryans, says new study", India Today)

Moorjani et al. (2013) notes that the period of 4,200–1,900 years BP was a time of dramatic changes in northern India, and coincides with the "likely first appearance of Indo-European languages and Vedic religion in the subcontinent". (Note: Moorjani: "The period of around 1,900–4,200 years BP was a time of profound change in India, characterized by the deurbanization of the Indus civilization, increasing population density in the central and downstream portions of the Gangetic system,40 shifts in burial practices, and the likely first appearance of Indo-European languages and Vedic religion in the subcontinent." Note that according to Salmons, language shift is driven by "systematic changes in community structure [...] namely a shift from local community-internal organization to regional (state or national or international, in modern settings), extra-community organizations. Shift correlates with this move from pre-dominantly 'horizontal' community structures to more 'vertical' ones.") Moorjani further notes that there must have been multiple waves of admixture, which had more impact on higher-caste and northern Indians and took place more recently. (Note: Moorjani: "Further evidence for multiple waves of admixture in the history of many traditionally middle- and upper-caste groups (as well as Indo-European and northern groups) comes from the more recent admixture dates we observe in these groups (Table 1) and the fact that a sum of two exponential functions often produces a better fit to the decay of admixture LD than does a single exponential (as noted above for some northern groups; Appendix B). Evidence for multiple components of West Eurasian-related ancestry in northern Indian populations has also been reported by Metspalu et al. based on clustering analysis.") This may be explained by "additional gene flow", related to the spread of languages:

...at least some of the history of population mixture in India is related to the spread of languages in the subcontinent. One possible explanation for the generally younger dates in northern Indians is that after an original mixture event of ANI and ASI that contributed to all present-day Indians, some northern groups received additional gene flow from groups with high proportions of West Eurasian ancestry, bringing down their average mixture date. (Note: The "original mixture event of ANI and ASI" may have been the spread of Dravidian languages to the south, followed by the (still ongoing) Sanskritization of India. Note that Asko Parpola proposes that the Harappans spoke Proto-Dravidian language, (Note: The Hindu, Underlying language of Indus script, Proto-Dravidian: Asko Parpola) and Mikhail Andronov proposes that the Proto-Dravidian language was introduced by migrations at the beginning of the third millennium BCE. See Dieneke's blogspot, "560K SNP study reveals dual rigin of Indian populations (Reich et al. 2009)" and Razib Khan (8 August 2013), "Indo-Aryans, Dravidians, and waves of admixture (migration?)" for various proposals and discussions, and this chart for the complexities of the Indian (and European) genepool.)

Palanichamy et al. (2015), elaborating on Kivisild et al. (1999) conclude that "A large proportion of the west Eurasian mtDNA haplogroups observed among the higher-ranked caste groups, their phylogenetic affinity and age estimate indicate recent Indo-Aryan migration to India from west Asia. According to Palanichamy et al. (2015), "the west Eurasian admixture was restricted to caste rank. It is likely that Indo-Aryan migration has influenced the social stratification in the pre-existing populations and helped in building the Hindu caste system, but it should not be inferred that the contemporary Indian caste groups have directly descended from Indo-Aryan immigrants. (Note: According to George Hart, there existed an "Early South Indian Caste System", which differed from the well-known classic north Indian vanas.)

Jones et al. (2015) state that Caucasus hunter gatherer(CHG) (Note: Caucasus Hunter Gatherers, one of the contributors to the Indo-Aryan gene-pool. According to Jones et al. (2015), "Caucasus hunter-gatherers (CHG) belong to a distinct ancient clade that split from western hunter-gatherers ~45 kya, shortly after the expansion of anatomically modern humans into Europe and from the ancestors of Neolithic farmers ~25 kya, around the Last Glacial Maximum.") was "a major contributor to the Ancestral North Indian component". According to Jones et al. (2015), it "may be linked with the spread of Indo-European languages", but they also note that "earlier movements associated with other developments such as that of cereal farming and herding are also plausible".

Basu et al. 2016 note that the ANI are inseparable from Central-South Asian populations in present-day Pakistan. They hypothesise that "the root of ANI is in Central Asia".

According to Lazaridis et al. (2016) ANI "can be modelled as a mix of ancestry related to both early farmers of western Iran and to people of the Bronze Age Eurasian steppe".

Silva et al. (2017) state that "the recently refined Y-chromosome tree strongly suggests that R1a is indeed a highly plausible marker for the long-contested Bronze Age spread of Indo-Aryan speakers into South Asia." (Note: See also Eurogenes Blog, "Heavily sex-biased" population dispersals into the Indian Subcontinent.) Silva et al. (2017) further notes "they likely spread from a single Central Asian source pool, there do seem to be at least three and probably more R1a founder clades within the Subcontinent, consistent with multiple waves of arrival."

Narasimhan et al. 2018 conclude that pastoralists spread southwards from the Eurasian steppe during the period 2300–1500 BCE. These pastoralists during the 2nd millennium BCE, who were likely associated with Indo-European languages, presumably mixed with the descendants of the Indus Valley Civilisation, who in turn were a mix of Iranian agriculturalists and South Asian hunter-gatherers forming "the single most important source of ancestry in South Asia."

==== Origins of R1a-Z93 ====
Ornella Semino et al. (2000) proposed Ukrainian origins of R1a1, and a postglacial spread of the R1a1 gene during the Late Glacial, subsequently magnified by the expansion of the Kurgan culture into Europe and eastward. Spencer Wells proposes central Asian origins, suggesting that the distribution and age of R1a1 points to an ancient migration corresponding to the spread by the Kurgan people in their expansion from the Eurasian Steppe. According to Pamjav et al. (2012), "Inner and Central Asia is an overlap zone for the R1a1-Z280 and R1a1-Z93 lineages [which] implies that an early differentiation zone of R1a1-M198 conceivably occurred somewhere within the Eurasian Steppes or the Middle East and Caucasus region as they lie between South Asia and Eastern Europe."

A 2014 study by Peter A. Underhill et al., using 16,244 individuals from over 126 populations from across Eurasia, concluded that there was compelling evidence that "the initial episodes of haplogroup R1a diversification likely occurred in the vicinity of present-day Iran."

According to Martin P. Richards, co-author of Silva et al. 2017, "[the prevalence of R1a in India was] very powerful evidence for a substantial Bronze Age migration from central Asia that most likely brought Indo-European speakers to India." (Note: See also: ""Heavily sex-biased" population dispersals into the Indian Subcontinent (Silva et al. 2017)". Eurogenes Blog. 28 March 2017.)

== Literary research: similarities, geography, and references to migration ==
=== Similarities ===
==== Mitanni ====
The oldest inscriptions in Old Indic, the language of the Rig Veda, is found not in India, but in northern Syria in Hittite records regarding one of their neighbors, the Hurrian-speaking Mitanni. In a treaty with the Hittites, the king of Mitanni, after swearing by a series of Hurrian gods, swears by the gods Mitrašil, Uruvanaššil, Indara, and Našatianna, who correspond to the Vedic gods Mitra, Varuna, Indra, and Nāsatya (Aśvin). Contemporary equestrian terminology, as recorded in a horse-training manual whose author is identified as "Kikkuli", contains Indo-Aryan loanwords. The personal names and gods of the Mitanni aristocracy also bear significant traces of Indo-Aryan. Because of the association of Indo-Aryan with horsemanship and the Mitanni aristocracy, it is presumed that, after superimposing themselves as rulers on a native Hurrian-speaking population about the 15th–16th centuries BCE, Indo-Aryan charioteers were absorbed into the local population and adopted the Hurrian language.

Brentjes argues that there is not a single cultural element of central Asian, Eastern European, or Caucasian origin in the Mitannian area; he also associates with an Indo-Aryan presence the peacock motif found in the Middle East from before 1600 BCE and quite likely from before 2100 BCE.

Scholars reject the possibility that the Indo-Aryans of Mitanni came from the Indian subcontinent as well as the possibility that the Indo-Aryans of the Indian subcontinent came from the territory of Mitanni, leaving migration from the north the only likely scenario. (Note: Mallory: "It is highly improbable that the Indo-Aryans of Western Asia migrated eastwards, for example with the collapse of the Mitanni, and wandered into India, since there is not a shred of evidence — for example, names of non-Indic deities, personal names, loan words — that the Indo-Aryans of India ever had any contacts with their west Asian neighbours. The reverse possibility, that a small group broke off and wandered from India into Western Asia is readily dismissed as an improbably long migration, again without the least bit of evidence.") The presence of some Bactria-Margiana loan words in Mitanni, Old Iranian and Vedic further strengthens this scenario.

==== Iranian Avesta ====
The religious practices depicted in the Rigveda and those depicted in the Avesta, the central religious text of Zoroastrianism—the ancient Iranian faith founded by the prophet Zoroaster—have in common the deity Mitra, priests called hotṛ in the Rigveda and zaotar in the Avesta, and the use of a ritual substance that the Rigveda calls soma and the Avesta haoma. However, the Indo-Aryan deva 'god' is cognate with the Iranian daēva 'demon'. Similarly, the Indo-Aryan asura 'name of a particular group of gods' (later on, 'demon') is cognate with the Iranian ahura 'lord, god,' which 19th and early 20th century authors such as Burrow explained as a reflection of religious rivalry between Indo-Aryans and Iranians.

Linguists such as Burrow argue that the strong similarity between the Avestan of the Gāthās—the oldest part of the Avesta—and the Vedic Sanskrit of the Rigveda pushes the dating of Zarathustra or at least the Gathas closer to the conventional Rigveda dating of 1500–1200 BCE, i.e. 1100 BCE, possibly earlier. Boyce concurs with a lower date of 1100 BCE and tentatively proposes an upper date of 1500 BCE. Gnoli dates the Gathas to around 1000 BCE, as does Mallory 1989, with the caveat of a 400-year leeway on either side, i.e. between 1400 and 600 BCE. Therefore, the date of the Avesta could also indicate the date of the Rigveda.

There is mention in the Avesta of Airyan Vaejah, one of the '16 the lands of the Aryans'. Gnoli's interpretation of geographic references in the Avesta situates the Airyanem Vaejah in the Hindu Kush. For similar reasons, Boyce excludes places north of the Syr Darya and western Iranian places. With some reservations, Skjaervo concurs that the evidence of the Avestan texts makes it impossible to avoid the conclusion that they were composed somewhere in northeastern Iran. Witzel points to the central Afghan highlands. Humbach derives Vaējah from cognates of the Vedic root "vij", suggesting the region of fast-flowing rivers. Gnoli considers Choresmia (Xvairizem), the lower Oxus region, south of the Aral Sea to be an outlying area in the Avestan world. However, according to Mallory & Mair 2000, the probable homeland of Avestan is, in fact, the area south of the Aral Sea.

=== Geographical location of Rigvedic rivers ===
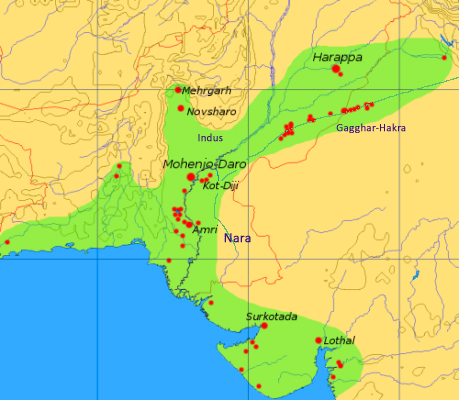
Cluster of Indus Valley Civilization site along the course of the Indus River and in Pakistan and the Ghaggar-Hakra in India and Pakistan. See Sameer et al. (2018) for a more detailed map.

The geography of the Rigveda seems to be centered on the land of the seven rivers. While the geography of the Rigvedic rivers is unclear in some of the early books of the Rigveda, the Nadistuti sukta is an important source for the geography of late Rigvedic society.

The Sarasvati River is one of the chief Rigvedic rivers. The Nadistuti sukta in the Rigveda mentions the Sarasvati between the Yamuna in the east and the Sutlej in the west, and later texts like the Brahmanas and Mahabharata mention that the Sarasvati dried up in a desert.

Scholars agree that at least some of the references to the Sarasvati in the Rigveda refer to the Ghaggar-Hakra River, while the Afghan river Haraxvaiti/Harauvati Helmand is sometimes quoted as the locus of the early Rigvedic river. Whether such a transfer of the name has taken place from the Helmand to the Ghaggar-Hakra is a matter of dispute. Identification of the early Rigvedic Sarasvati with the Ghaggar-Hakra before its assumed drying up early in the second millennium would place the Rigveda BCE, (Note: The Saraswati:- Where lies the mystery) well outside the range commonly assumed by Indo-Aryan migration theory.

A non-Indo-Aryan substratum in the river-names and place-names of the Rigvedic homeland would support an external origin of the Indo-Aryans. However, most place-names in the Rigveda and the vast majority of the river-names in the north-west of the Indian subcontinent are Indo-Aryan. Non-Indo-Aryan names are, however, frequent in the Ghaggar and Kabul River areas, the first being a post-Harappan stronghold of Indus populations.

=== Textual references to migrations ===
==== Rigveda ====
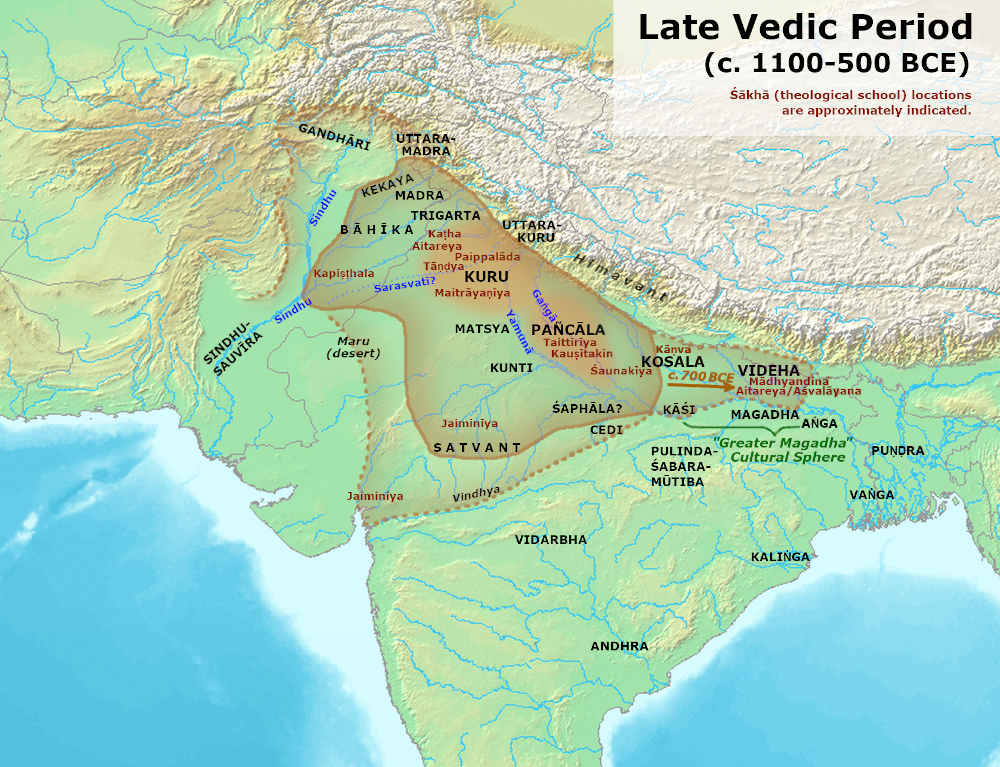
Probable geographic expansion of late Vedic culture

Just as the Avesta does not mention an external homeland of the Zoroastrians, the Rigveda does not explicitly refer to an external homeland or to a migration. (Note: According to Cardona, "there is no textual evidence in the early literary traditions unambiguously showing a trace" of an Indo-Aryan migration.) Later Hindu texts, such as the Brahmanas, Mahabharata, Ramayana, and Puranas, are centered in the Ganges region (rather than Haryana and Punjab) and mention regions still further to the south and east, suggesting a later movement or expansion of the Vedic religion and culture to the east. There is no clear indication of general movement in either direction in the Rigveda itself; searching for indirect references in the text, or by correlating geographic references with the proposed order of composition of its hymns, has not led to any consensus on the issue.

==== Srauta Sutra of Baudhayana ====
According to Romila Thapar, the Srauta Sutra of Baudhayana "refers to the Parasus and the arattas who stayed behind and others who moved eastwards to the middle Ganges valley and the places equivalent such as the Kasi, the Videhas and the Kuru Pancalas, and so on. In fact, when one looks for them, there are evidence for migration." (Note: Vishal Agarwal (2005), On Perceiving Aryan Migrations in Vedic Ritual Texts. Purātattva, issue 36, p.155-165)

==== Later Vedic and Hindu texts ====
Later Vedic texts show a shift of location from the Punjab to the East. According to the Yajurveda, Yajnavalkya (a Vedic ritualist and philosopher) lived in the eastern region of Mithila. Aitareya Brahmana 33.6.1. records that Vishvamitra's sons migrated to the north, and in Shatapatha Brahmana 1:2:4:10 the Asuras were driven to the north. In much later texts, Manu was said to be a king from Dravida. In the legend of the flood he stranded with his ship in Northwestern India or the Himalayas. The Vedic lands (e.g. Aryavarta, Brahmavarta) are located in Northern India or at the Sarasvati and Drishadvati river. However, in a post-Vedic text the Mahabharata Udyoga Parva (108), the East is described as the homeland of the Vedic culture, where "the divine Creator of the universe first sang the Vedas". The legends of Ikshvaku, Sumati and other Hindu legends may have their origin in Southeast Asia.

The Puranas record that Yayati left Prayag (confluence of the Ganges & Yamuna) and conquered the region of Sapta Sindhu. His five sons Yadu, Druhyus, Puru, Anu and Turvashu correspond to the main tribes of the Rigveda.

The Puranas also record that the Druhyus were driven out of the land of the seven rivers by Mandhatr and that their next king Gandhara settled in a north-western region which became known as Gandhara. The sons of the later Druhyu king Prachetas are supposed by some to have 'migrated' to the region north of Afghanistan though the Puranic texts only speak of an "adjacent" settlement. (Note: see e.g. Pargiter 1979, Talageri 1993, Talageri 2000, Bryant 2001, Elst 1999)

== Ecology ==
Climate change and drought may have triggered both the initial dispersal of Indo-European speakers, and the migration of Indo-Europeans from the steppes in south-central Asia and India.

Around 4200–4100 BCE a climate change occurred, manifesting in colder winters in Europe. Between 4200 and 3900 BCE many tell settlements in the lower Danube Valley were burned and abandoned, while the Cucuteni-Tripolye culture showed an increase in fortifications, meanwhile moving eastwards towards the Dniepr. Steppe herders, archaic Proto-Indo-European speakers, spread into the lower Danube valley about 4200–4000 BCE, either causing or taking advantage of the collapse of Old Europe.

The Yamna horizon was an adaptation to a climate change which occurred between 3500 and 3000 BCE, in which the steppes became drier and cooler. Herds needed to be moved frequently to feed them sufficiently, and the use of wagons and horse-back riding made this possible, leading to "a new, more mobile form of pastoralism". It was accompanied by new social rules and institutions, to regulate the local migrations in the steppes, creating a new social awareness of a distinct culture, and of "cultural Others" who did not participate in these new institutions.

In the second millennium BCE widespread aridization led to water shortages and ecological changes in both the Eurasian steppes and south Asia. At the steppes, humidization led to a change of vegetation, triggering "higher mobility and transition to the nomadic cattle breeding". (Note: Demkina et al. (2017): "In the second millennium BC, humidization of the climate led to the divergence of the soil cover with secondary formation of the complexes of chestnut soils and solonetzes. This paleoecological crisis had a significant effect on the economy of the tribes in the Late Catacomb and Post-Catacomb time stipulating their higher mobility and transition to the nomadic cattle breeding.") (Note: See also Eurogenes Blogspot, The crisis.) Water shortage also had a strong impact in south Asia:

This time was one of great upheaval for ecological reasons. Prolonged failure of rains caused acute water shortage in a large area, causing the collapse of sedentary urban cultures in south-central Asia, Afghanistan, Iran, and India, and triggering large-scale migrations. Inevitably, the new arrivals came to merge with and dominate the post-urban cultures.

The Indus Valley civilisation was localised, that is, urban centers disappeared and were replaced by local cultures, due to a climatic change that is also signalled for the neighbouring areas of the Middle East. As of 2016 many scholars believe that drought and a decline in trade with Egypt and Mesopotamia caused the collapse of the Indus Civilisation. The Ghaggar-Hakra system was rain-fed, and water-supply depended on the monsoons. The Indus valley climate grew significantly cooler and drier from about 1800 BCE, linked to a general weakening of the monsoon at that time. The Indian monsoon declined and aridity increased, with the Ghaggar-Hakra retracting its reach towards the foothills of the Himalaya, leading to erratic and less extensive floods that made inundation agriculture less sustainable. Aridification reduced the water supply enough to cause the civilisation's demise, and to scatter its population eastward.

== Indigenous Aryanism ==
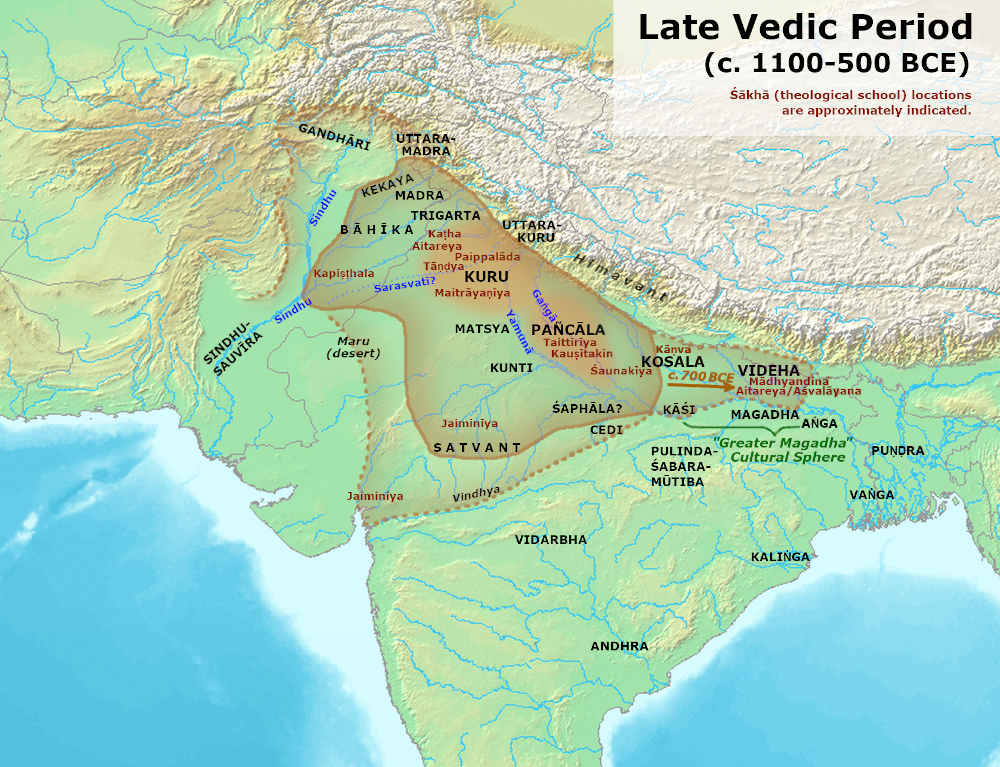
The approximate extent of Āryāvarta during the late Vedic period (ca. 1100–500 BCE). Aryavarta was limited to northwest India and the western Ganges plain, while Greater Magadha in the east was habitated by non-Vedic Indo-Aryans, who gave rise to Jainism and Buddhism.

Hindutva opponents of the Indo-Aryan migration question it, and instead promote Indigenous Aryanism, claiming that speakers of Indo-Iranian languages (sometimes called Aryan languages) are "indigenous" to the Indian subcontinent. However, Indigenous Aryanism has no support in contemporary mainstream scholarship, as it is contradicted by a broad range of research and evidence on Indo-European migrations. (Note: No support in mainstream scholarship: Romila Thapar (2006): "there is no scholar at this time seriously arguing for the indigenous origin of Aryans".; Wendy Doniger (2017): "The opposing argument, that speakers of Indo-European languages were indigenous to the Indian subcontinent, is not supported by any reliable scholarship. It is now championed primarily by Hindu nationalists, whose religious sentiments have led them to regard the theory of Aryan migration with some asperity." (Note: Wendy Doniger (2017), "Another Great Story"", review of Asko Parpola's The Roots of Hinduism; in: Inference, International Review of Science, Volume 3, Issue 2); Girish Shahane (14 September 2019), in response to Narasimhan et al. (2019): "Hindutva activists, however, have kept the Aryan Invasion Theory alive, because it offers them the perfect strawman, 'an intentionally misrepresented proposition that is set up because it is easier to defeat than an opponent's real argument' ... The Out of India hypothesis is a desperate attempt to reconcile linguistic, archaeological and genetic evidence with Hindutva sentiment and nationalistic pride, but it cannot reverse time's arrow ... The evidence keeps crushing Hindutva ideas of history." (Note: Girish Shahane (14 September 2019), Why Hindutva supporters love to hate the discredited Aryan Invasion Theory, Scroll.in); Koenraad Elst (10 May 2016): "Of course it is a fringe theory, at least internationally, where the Aryan Invasion Theory (AIT) is still the official paradigm. In India, though, it has the support of most archaeologists, who fail to find a trace of this Aryan influx and instead find cultural continuity."; Witzel 2001, p. 95: "The "revisionist project" certainly is not guided by the principles of critical theory but takes, time and again, recourse to pre-enlightenment beliefs in the authority of traditional religious texts such as the Purånas. In the end, it belongs, as has been pointed out earlier, to a different 'discourse' than that of historical and critical scholarship. In other words, it continues the writing of religious literature, under a contemporary, outwardly 'scientific' guise ... The revisionist and autochthonous project, then, should not be regarded as scholarly in the usual post-enlightenment sense of the word, but as an apologetic, ultimately religious undertaking aiming at proving the "truth" of traditional texts and beliefs. Worse, it is, in many cases, not even scholastic scholarship at all but a political undertaking aiming at "rewriting" history out of national pride or for the purpose of "nation building".")

== See also ==
- Early Indians
- List of ancient Indo-Aryan peoples and tribes
- Indo-Aryan peoples
- Indo-Aryan languages
- Indo-European migrations
- Ariana
- Tamil nationalism
- Keezhadi excavation site

== Sources ==
=== Printed sources ===
- Allchin, F. Raymond (1995). The Archaeology of Early History South Asia: The Emergence of Cities and States. Cambridge University Press.
- Allentoft, Morten E.; Sikora, Martin; Sjögren, Karl-Göran; Rasmussen, Simon; et al. (2015). "Population genomics of Bronze Age Eurasia". Nature. 522 (7555): 167–172. Bibcode:2015Natur.522..167A. doi:10.1038/nature14507. PMID 26062507. S2CID 4399103.
- Andronov, Mikhail Sergeevich (2003). A Comparative Grammar of the Dravidian Languages. Otto Harrassowitz Verlag. ISBN 978-3-447-04455-4.
- Anthony, David; Vinogradov, Nikolai (1995). "Birth of the Chariot". Archaeology. 48 (2): 36–41.
- Anthony, David W. (2007). The Horse The Wheel And Language. How Bronze-Age Riders From the Eurasian Steppes Shaped The Modern World. Princeton University Press.
- Anthony, David; Ringe, Don (2015). "The Indo-European Homeland from Linguistic and Archaeological Perspectives". Annual Review of Linguistics. 1: 199–219. doi:10.1146/annurev-linguist-030514-124812.
- Arun Kumar, GaneshPrasad; Tatarinova, Tatiana V.; Duty, Jeff; Rollo, Debra; Syama, Adhikarla; Arun, Varatharajan Santhakumari; Kavitha, Valampuri John; Triska, Petr; Greenspan, Bennett; Wells, R. Spencer; Pitchappan, Ramasamy; et al. (2015). "Genome-wide signatures of male-mediated migration shaping the Indian gene pool". Journal of Human Genetics. 60 (9): 493–9. doi:10.1038/jhg.2015.51. PMID 25994871. S2CID 8926804.
- Bamshad, Michael; et al. (2001). "Genetic Evidence on the Origins of Indian Caste Populations". Genome Research. 11 (6): 994–1004. doi:10.1101/gr.GR-1733RR. PMC 311057. PMID 11381027.
- Basu, Analabha; Mukherjee, Namita; Roy, Sangita (2003). "Ethnic India: A Genomic View, With Special Reference to Peopling and Structure". Genome Research. 13 (10): 2277–2290. doi:10.1101/gr.1413403. PMC 403703. PMID 14525929.
- Basu, Analabha; Sarkar-Roya, Neeta; Majumder, Partha P. (9 February 2016). "Genomic reconstruction of the history of extant populations of India reveals five distinct ancestral components and a complex structure". Proceedings of the National Academy of Sciences of the United States of America. 113 (6): 1594–1599. Bibcode:2016PNAS..113.1594B. doi:10.1073/pnas.1513197113. PMC 4760789. PMID 26811443.
- Beckwith, Christopher I. (16 March 2009). Empires of the Silk Road: A History of Central Eurasia from the Bronze Age to the Present. Princeton University Press. ISBN 978-1-4008-2994-1.
- Blench, Roger; Spriggs, Matthew, eds. (1997). Archaeology and Language. Vol. I: Theoretical and Methodological Orientations. London: Routledge.
- Bronkhorst, J.; Deshpande, M. M., eds. (1999), Aryan and Non-Aryan in South Asia: Evidence, Interpretation, and Ideology, Department of Sanskrit and Indian Studies, Harvard University, ISBN 978-1-888789-04-1
- Bronkhorst, Johannes (2007). Greater Magadha: Studies in the Culture of Early India. BRILL. ISBN 978-90-04-15719-4.
- Bryant, Edwin (2001). The Quest for the Origins of Vedic Culture: The Indo-Aryan Migration Debate. Oxford University Press. ISBN 978-0-19-513777-4..
- Bryant, Edwin F.; Patton, Laurie L., eds. (2005). The Indo-Aryan Controversy: Evidence and inference in Indian history. London: Routledge. ISBN 978-0-7007-1463-6.
- Burrow, T. (1973). "The Proto-Indoaryans". Journal of the Royal Asiatic Society. 105 (2): 123–140. doi:10.1017/S0035869X00130837. JSTOR 25203451. S2CID 162454265.
- Cardona, George (2002). The Indo-Aryan languages. Routledge Curzon. ISBN 978-0-7007-1130-7.
- Cavalli-Sforza, Luigi Luca; Menozzi, Paolo; Piazza, Alberto (1994). The History and Geography of Human Genes. Princeton University Press.
- Cavalli-Sforza, Luigi Luca (2000), Genes, Peoples, and Languages, New York: North Point Press
- Campbell, Lyle; Poser, William J. (2008), Language Classification: History and Method, Cambridge University Press, ISBN 978-0-521-88005-3.
- Chakrabarti, D.K. (1992), The Early use of Iron in India, New Delhi: The Oxford University Press
- Chakrabarti, D.K (1977), "India and West Asia: An Alternative Approach", Man and Environment, 1: 25–38
- Chaubey, Gyaneshwar; et al. (2007), "Peopling of South Asia: investigating the caste-tribe continuum in India", BioEssays, vol. 29, no. 1, pp. 91–100, CiteSeerX 10.1.1.551.2654, doi:10.1002/bies.20525, PMID 17187379
- Cordeaux, Richard; Deepa, Edwin; Vishwanathan, H.; Stoneking, Mark (2004), "Genetic Evidence for the Demic Diffusion of Agriculture to India", Science, 304 (5674): 1125, CiteSeerX 10.1.1.486.6510, doi:10.1126/science.1095819, PMID 15155941, S2CID 32528388
- Danino, Michel (2010), The Lost River – On the trail of the Sarasvati, Penguin Books India
- Demkina, T.S. (2017), "Paleoecological crisis in the steppes of the Lower Volga region in the Middle of the Bronze Age (III–II centuries BC)", Eurasian Soil Science, 50 (7): 791–804, Bibcode:2017EurSS..50..791D, doi:10.1134/S1064229317070018, S2CID 133638705
- Dhavalikar, M. K. (1995), "Fire Altars or Fire Pits?", in V. Shivananda; M. K. Visweswara (eds.), Sri Nagabhinandanam, Bangalore: M.S. Nagaraja Rao Felicitation Committee
- Diakonoff, Igor M.; Kuz'mina, E. E.; Ivantchik, Askold I. (1995), "Two Recent Studies of Indo-Iranian Origins", Journal of the American Oriental Society, vol. 115, no. 3, pp. 473–477, doi:10.2307/606224, JSTOR 606224.
- Elst, Koenraad (1999), Update on the Aryan Invasion Debate, New Delhi: Aditya Prakashan, ISBN 978-81-86471-77-7, archived from the original on 17 September 2018.
- Elst, Koenraad (2005), "Linguistic Aspects of the Aryan Non-Invasion Theory", in Bryant, Edwin; Patton, Laurie L. (eds.), The Indo-Aryan Controversy. Evidence and inference in Indian history, Rouetledge
- Erdosy, George, ed. (1995), The Indo-Aryans of Ancient South Asia: Language, Material Culture and Ethnicity, Berlin/New York: Walter de Gruyter, ISBN 978-3-11-014447-5
- Esleben, Jorg; Kraenzle, Christina; Kulkarni, Sukanya (2008), Mapping channels between Ganges and Rhein: German-Indian cross-cultural relations, Cambridge Scholars publication, ISBN 978-1-84718-587-7
- Flood, Gavin D. (1996), An Introduction to Hinduism, Cambridge University Press, ISBN 978-0-521-43878-0
- Flood, Gavin (2008). The Blackwell Companion to Hinduism. John Wiley & Sons.
- Fortson, Benjamin W. IV (2004), Indo-European Language and Culture: An Introduction, Oxford: Blackwell, ISBN 978-1-4051-0316-9
- Fosse, Lars Martin (2005). "Aryan past and post-colonial present. The polemics and politics of indigenous Aryanism". In Bryant, Edwin; Patton, Laurie L. (eds.). The Indo-Aryan Controversy. Evidence and inference in Indian history. Routledge.
- Fosse, L.M. (2013), "Aryan past and post-colonial present: the polemics and politics of indigenous Aryanism.", in Bryant, Edwin; Patton, Laurie L. (eds.), The Indo-Aryan Controversy. Evidence and inference in Indian history, Routledge, pp. 434–467, ISBN 978-1-135-79102-5
- Fu, Q.; Posth, C.; Hajdinjak, M.; Petr, Martin; et al. (2016). "The genetic history of Ice Age Europe". Nature. 534 (7606): 200–205. Bibcode:2016Natur.534..200F. doi:10.1038/nature17993. hdl:10211.3/198594. PMC 4943878. PMID 27135931.
- Gallego Romero, Irene; et al. (2011), "Herders of Indian and European Cattle Share their Predominant Allele for Lactase Persistence", Molecular Biology and Evolution, 29 (1): 249–60, doi:10.1093/molbev/msr190, PMID 21836184
- Gomez, Luis O. (2013), Buddhism in India. In: Joseph Kitagawa, "The Religious Traditions of Asia: Religion, History, and Culture", Routledge, ISBN 978-1-136-87590-8
- Gupta, Tania Das (2007), Race and Racialization: Essential Readings, Canadian Scholars' Press, ISBN 978-1-55130-335-2
- Haak, W.; Lazaridis, I.; Patterson, N.; Rohland, N.; Mallick, S.; Llamas, B.; Brandt, G.; Nordenfelt, S.; Harney, E.; Stewardson, K.; Fu, Q.; Mittnik, A.; Bánffy, E.; Economou, C.; Francken, M.; Friederich, S.; Pena, R. G.; Hallgren, F.; Khartanovich, V.; Khokhlov, A.; Kunst, M.; Kuznetsov, P.; Meller, H.; Mochalov, O.; Moiseyev, V.; Nicklisch, N.; Pichler, S. L.; Risch, R.; Rojo Guerra, M. A.; et al. (2015). "Massive migration from the steppe was a source for Indo-European languages in Europe. Supplementary Information". Nature. 522 (7555): 207–211. arXiv:1502.02783. Bibcode:2015Natur.522..207H. doi:10.1038/nature14317. PMC 5048219. PMID 25731166.
- Hanks, B.; Linduff, K. (2009). "Late Prehistoric Mining, Metallurgy, and Social Organization in North Central Eurasia". In Hanks, B.; Linduff, K. (eds.). Social Complexity in Prehistoric Eurasia: Monuments, Metals, and Mobility. Cambridge University Press. pp. 146–167. doi:10.1017/CBO9780511605376.005. ISBN 978-0-511-60537-6.
- Hiltebeitel, Alf (2013), Hinduism. In: Joseph Kitagawa, "The Religious Traditions of Asia: Religion, History, and Culture", Routledge, ISBN 978-1-136-87597-7
- Hock, Hans (1991), Principles of Historical Linguistics, Walter de Gruyter
- Holloway, Ralph L. (November 2002), "Head to head with Boas: Did he err on the plasticity of head form?", Proceedings of the National Academy of Sciences of the United States of America, 99 (23): 14622–14623, Bibcode:2002PNAS...9914622H, doi:10.1073/pnas.242622399, PMC 137467, PMID 12419854.
- Jamison, Stephanie W. (2006), "Review of Bryant & Patton 2005" (PDF), Journal of Indo-European Studies, 34: 255–261
- Jones, Constance; Ryan, James D. (2006), Encyclopedia of Hinduism, Infobase Publishing, ISBN 978-0-8160-7564-5
- Jones, Eppie R. (2016), "Upper Palaeolithic genomes reveal deep roots of modern Eurasians", Nature Communications, 6 8912, Bibcode:2015NatCo...6.8912J, doi:10.1038/ncomms9912, PMC 4660371, PMID 26567969
- Kennedy, Kenneth A. R. (2000), God-apes and Fossil Men: Paleoanthropology of South Asia, University of Michigan Press, ISBN 978-0-472-11013-1
- Kenoyer, Jonathan Mark (1991b), "Urban Process in the Indus Tradition: A preliminary model from Harappa", in Meadow, R. H. (ed.), Harappa Excavations 1986-1990: A multidiscipinary approach to Third Millennium urbanism, Madison, WI: Prehistory Press, pp. 29–60
- Kivisild; et al. (1999), "Deep common ancestry of Indian and western-Eurasian mitochondrial DNA lineages", Current Biology, 9 (22): 1331–1334, Bibcode:1999CBio....9.1331K, doi:10.1016/s0960-9822(00)80057-3, PMID 10574762, S2CID 2821966
- Kivisild, T.; et al. (February 2003), "The Genetic Heritage of the Earliest Settlers Persists Both in Indian Tribal and Caste Populations", American Journal of Human Genetics, 72 (2): 313–332, Bibcode:2003AmJHG..72..313K, doi:10.1086/346068, PMC 379225, PMID 12536373
- Kochhar, Rajesh (2000), The Vedic People: Their History and Geography, Sangam Books
- Koryakova, L. (1998a). "Sintashta-Arkaim Culture". The Center for the Study of the Eurasian Nomads (CSEN). Archived from the original on 9 February 1999.
- Koryakova, L. (1998b). "An Overview of the Andronovo Culture: Late Bronze Age Indo-Iranians in Central Asia". The Center for the Study of the Eurasian Nomads (CSEN). Archived from the original on 1 December 1998.
- Kuz'mina, E. E. (1994), Откуда пришли индоарии? (Whence came the Indo-Aryans), Moscow: Российская академия наук (Russian Academy of Sciences).
- Kuz'mina, Elena Efimovna (2007), J. P. Mallory (ed.), The Origin of the Indo-Iranians, Brill, ISBN 978-90-04-16054-5
- Kuznetsov, P. F. (2006). "The emergence of Bronze Age chariots in eastern Europe". Antiquity. 80 (309): 638–645. doi:10.1017/S0003598X00094096. S2CID 162580424.
- Lal, B. B. (1984), Frontiers of the Indus Civilization
- Lal, B. B. (1998), New Light on the Indus Civilization, Delhi: Aryan Books International
- Lal, B. B. (2002), The Saraswati Flows on: the Continuity of Indian Culture, New Delhi: Aryan Books International
- Lal, B. B. (2005), The Homeland of the Aryans. Evidence of Rigvedic Flora and Fauna & Archaeology, New Delhi: Aryan Books International
- Larson, Gerald James (2009), "Hinduism", World Religions in America: An Introduction, Westminster John Knox Press, ISBN 978-1-61164-047-2
- Lazaridis, Iosif (2016), "Genomic insights into the origin of farming in the ancient Near East", Nature, 536 (7617): 419–424, Bibcode:2016Natur.536..419L, bioRxiv 10.1101/059311, doi:10.1038/nature19310, PMC 5003663, PMID 27459054
- Lehmann, Winfred P. (1993), Theoretical Bases of Indo-European Linguistics, London: Routledge
- Loewe, Michael; Shaughnessy, Edward L. (1999). The Cambridge History of Ancient China: From the Origins of Civilization to 221 BC. Cambridge University Press. pp. 87–88. ISBN 978-0-5214-7030-8.
- Lockard, Craig A. (2007). "Societies, Networks, and Transitions. Volume I: to 1500". Cengage Learning. ISBN 978-0-618-38612-3.
- Majumdar, R. C.; Pusalker, A. D., eds. (1951). The History and Culture of the Indian People. Volume I, The Vedic age. Bombay: Bharatiya Vidya Bhavan.
- Mallory, J. P. (1989). In Search of the Indo-Europeans: Language, Archaeology, and Myth. London: Thames & Hudson. ISBN 978-0-500-27616-7.
- Mallory, J. P.; Mair, Victor H. (2000). The Tarim Mummies: Ancient China and the Mystery of the Earliest Peoples from the West. London: Thames & Hudson. ISBN 978-0-500-05101-6.
- Mallory, J.P. (2002). "Archaeological models and Asian Indo-Europeans". In Sims-Williams, Nicholas (ed.). Indi-Iranian Languages and Peoples. Oxford University Press.
- Mallory, J.P. (2012), "Twenty-first century clouds over Indo-European homelands" (PDF), Journal of Language Relationship, 9: 145–154, doi:10.31826/jlr-2013-090113, S2CID 212689004
- Mallory, J.P.; Adams, D.Q. (1997), Encyclopedia of Indo-European Culture, Taylor & Francis
- Mascarenhas, Desmond D.; Raina, Anupuma; Aston, Christopher E.; Sanghera, Dharambir K. (2015), "Genetic and Cultural Reconstruction of the Migration of an Ancient Lineage", BioMed Research International, 2015: 1–16, doi:10.1155/2015/651415, PMC 4605215, PMID 26491681
- McGetchin, Douglas T. (2015), "'Orient' and 'Occident', 'East' and 'West' in the Doscourse of German Orientalists, 1790–1930", in Bavaj, Riccardo; Steber, Martina (eds.), Germany and 'The West': The History of a Modern Concept, Berghahn Books
- Melton, Gordon J.; Baumann, Martin (2010), Religions of the World: A Comprehensive Encyclopedia of Beliefs and Practices (6 volumes), ABC-CLIO
- Metspalu, Mait; Gallego Romero, Irene; Yunusbayev, Bayazit; Chaubey, Gyaneshwer; Mallick, Chandana Basu; Hudjashov, Georgi; Nelis, Mari; Mägi, Reedik; Metspalu, Ene; Remm, Maido; Pitchappan, Ramasamy; Singh, Lalji; Thangaraj, Kumarasamy; Villems, Richard; Kivisild, Toomas (2011). "Shared and Unique Components of Human Population Structure and Genome-Wide Signals of Positive Selection in South Asia". American Journal of Human Genetics. 89 (6): 731–744. doi:10.1016/j.ajhg.2011.11.010. ISSN 0002-9297. PMC 3234374. PMID 22152676.
- Moorjani, P.; Thangaraj, K.; Patterson, N.; Lipson, M.; Loh, P. R.; Govindaraj, P.; Singh, L. (2013). "Genetic evidence for recent population mixture in India". American Journal of Human Genetics. 93 (3): 422–438. doi:10.1016/j.ajhg.2013.07.006. PMC 3769933. PMID 23932107.
- Muller, Max (1988), Biographies of words and the home of the Aryas, Longmans
- Narasimhan, Vagheesh M.; Anthony, David; Mallory, James; Reich, David (2019). "The formation of human populations in South and Central Asia". Science. 365 (6457) eaat7487. Bibcode:2019Sci...365t7487N. bioRxiv 10.1101/292581. doi:10.1126/science.aat7487. PMC 6822619. PMID 31488661.
- Narasimhan, Vagheesh M.; Patterson, N. J.; Moorjani, Priya; Rohland, Nadin; et al. (2019). "The Formation of Human Populations in South and Central Asia". Science. 365 (6457) eaat7487. Bibcode:2019Sci...365t7487N. doi:10.1126/science.aat7487. PMC 6822619. PMID 31488661.
- Narayanan, Vasudha (2009), Hinduism, The Rosen Publishing Group, ISBN 978-1-4358-5620-2
- Palanichamy, Malliya Gounder (2015), "West Eurasian mtDNA lineages in India: an insight into the spread of the Dravidian language and the origins of the caste system", Human Genetics, 134 (6): 637–647, doi:10.1007/s00439-015-1547-4, PMID 25832481, S2CID 14202246
- Pamjav (December 2012), "Brief communication: New Y-chromosome binary markers improve phylogenetic resolution within haplogroup R1a1", American Journal of Physical Anthropology, 149 (4): 611–615, Bibcode:2012AJPA..149..611P, doi:10.1002/ajpa.22167, PMID 23115110
- Pargiter, F. E. (1979) [first published 1922], Ancient Indian Historical Tradition, New Delhi: Cosmo
- Parpola, Asko (1998), "Aryan Languages, Archaeological Cultures, and Sinkiang: Where Did Proto-Iranian Come into Being and How Did It Spread?", in Mair (ed.), The Bronze Age and Early Iron Age Peoples of Eastern Central Asia, Washington, D.C.: Institute for the Study of Man, ISBN 978-0-941694-63-6
- Parpola, Asko (1999), "The formation of the Aryan branch of Indo-European", in Blench, Roger; Spriggs, Matthew (eds.), Archaeology and Language, vol. III: Artefacts, languages and texts, London and New York: Routledge.
- Parpola, Asko (2005), "Study of the Indus script", Transactions of the 50th International Conference of Eastern Studies, Tokyo: The Tôhô Gakkai, pp. 28–66
- Parpola, Asko (2015), The Roots of Hinduism. The Early Aryans and the Indus Civilization, Oxford University Press
- Parpola, Asko (2020). "Royal "Chariot" Burials of Sanauli near Delhi and Archaeological Correlates of Prehistoric Indo-Iranian Languages". Studia Orientalia Electronica. 8: 176. doi:10.23993/store.98032.
- Pereltsvaig, Asya; Lewis, Martin W. (2015), The Indo-European Controversy, Cambridge University Press
- Poznik (2016), "Punctuated bursts in human male demography inferred from 1,244 worldwide Y-chromosome sequences", Nature Genetics, 48 (6): 593–599, Bibcode:2016NaGen..48..593P, doi:10.1038/ng.3559, PMC 4884158, PMID 27111036
- Rao, S.R. (1993), The Aryans in Indus Civilization
- Reich, David; Thangaraj, Kumarasamy; Patterson, Nick; Price, Alkes L.; Singh, Lalji (2009), "Reconstructing Indian population history", Nature, 461 (7263): 489–494, Bibcode:2009Natur.461..489R, doi:10.1038/nature08365, ISSN 0028-0836, PMC 2842210, PMID 19779445
- Renfrew, Colin (1992), "Archaeology, genetics and linguistic diversity", Man, 27 (3): 445–478, doi:10.2307/2803924, JSTOR 2803924
- Sahoo, Sanghamitra; et al. (January 2006). "A prehistory of Indian Y chromosomes: Evaluating demic diffusion scenarios". Proceedings of the National Academy of Sciences of the United States of America. 103 (4): 843–848. Bibcode:2006PNAS..103..843S. doi:10.1073/pnas.0507714103. PMC 1347984. PMID 16415161.
- Salmons, Joseph (2015). "Language shift and the Indo-Europanization of Europe". In Mailhammer, Robert; Vennemann, Theo; Olsen, Birgit Anette (eds.). Origin and Development of European Languages. Museum Tusculanum Press.
- Samuel, Geoffrey (2010). The Origins of Yoga and Tantra. Cambridge University Press.
- Sapir, Edward (1985). Mandelbaum, David G. (ed.). Selected Writings in Language, Culture, and Personality. University of California Press. ISBN 978-0-520-01115-1.
- Sengupta, S.; et al. (2006), "Polarity and temporality of high-resolution y-chromosome distributions in India identify both indigenous and exogenous expansions and reveal minor genetic influence of Central Asian pastoralists", American Journal of Human Genetics, 78 (2): 201–221, Bibcode:2006AmJHG..78..202S, doi:10.1086/499411, PMC 1380230, PMID 16400607.
- Shaffer, Jim (1984), "The Indo-Aryan Invasions: Cultural Myth and Archaeological Reality", in J. R. Lukacs (ed.), In The Peoples of South Asia, New York: Plenum Press, pp. 74–90
- Sharma, S.; Saha, A.; Rai, E.; Bhat, A.; Bamezai, R. (2005), "Human mtDNA hypervariable regions, HVR I and II, hint at deep common maternal founder and subsequent maternal gene flow in Indian population groups", Journal of Human Genetics, 50 (10): 497–506, doi:10.1007/s10038-005-0284-2, PMID 16205836.
- Sharma, Swarkar; et al. (2009), "The Indian origin of paternal haplogroup R1a1 substantiates the autochthonous origin of Brahmins and the caste system" (PDF), Journal of Human Genetics, 54 (1): 47–55, doi:10.1038/jhg.2008.2, PMID 19158816, S2CID 22162114
- Shinde, Vasant; Narasimhan, Vagheesh M.; Rohland, Nadin; Mallick, Swapan; et al. (2019), "An Ancient Harappan Genome Lacks Ancestry from Steppe Pastoralists or Iranian Farmers", Cell, 179 (3): 729–735.e10, doi:10.1016/j.cell.2019.08.048, PMC 6800651, PMID 31495572
- Silva, Marina; et al. (2017), "A genetic chronology for the Indian Subcontinent points to heavily sex-biased dispersals", BMC Evolutionary Biology, 17 (1) 88, Bibcode:2017BMCEE..17...88S, doi:10.1186/s12862-017-0936-9, PMC 5364613, PMID 28335724
- Singh, Upinder (2009), History of Ancient and Early Medieval India: From the Stone Age to the 12th Century, Longman, ISBN 978-81-317-1677-9
- Springer (2012), International Journal of Hindu Studies, vol. 16
- Talageri, Shrikant G. (2000), The Rigveda: A Historical Analysis, New Delhi: Aditya Prakashan, ISBN 978-81-7742-010-4, archived from the original on 30 September 2007.
- Talageri, Shrikant G. (1993), Aryan Invasion Theory and Indian Nationalism, ISBN 978-81-85990-02-6.
- Thapar, Romila (1966), A History of India: Volume 1 (Paperback), Penguin Publishing, ISBN 978-0-14-013835-1
- Thapar, Romila (January–March 1996), "The Theory of Aryan Race and India: History and Politics" (PDF), Social Scientist, 24 (1–3): 3–29, doi:10.2307/3520116, JSTOR 3520116
- Thapar, Romila (2006). India: Historical Beginnings and the Concept of the Aryan. National Book Trust. ISBN 978-81-237-4779-8.
- Thapar, Romila (2019), "They Peddle Myths and Call It History", New York Times
- Thomason, Sarah Grey; Kaufman, Terrence (1991), Language Contact, Creolization, and Genetic Linguistics, University of California Press, ISBN 978-0-520-07893-2.
- Tikkanen, Bertil (1999), "Archaeological-linguistic correlations in the formation of retroflex typologies and correlating areal features in South Asia", in Blench, Roger; Spriggs, Matthew (eds.), Archaeology and Language, vol. IV: Language Change and Cultural Transformation, London: Routledge, pp. 138–148.
- Trautmann, Thomas R. (2006) [1997]. Aryans and British India (2nd Indian ed.). New Delhi: YODA Press. ISBN 81-902272-1-1., originally published as Trautmann, Thomas R. (1997), Aryans and British India, Vistaar
- Trautmann, Thomas (2005). The Aryan Debate. Oxford University Press. ISBN 978-0-19-566908-4.
- Underhill, Peter A. (2010). "Separating the post-Glacial coancestry of European and Asian Y chromosomes within haplogroup R1a". European Journal of Human Genetics. 18 (4): 479–84. doi:10.1038/ejhg.2009.194. PMC 2987245. PMID 19888303.
- Underhill, Peter A. (2015). "The phylogenetic and geographic structure of Y-chromosome haplogroup R1a". European Journal of Human Genetics. 23 (1): 124–131. doi:10.1038/ejhg.2014.50. PMC 4266736. PMID 24667786.
- Walsh, Judith E. (2011), A Brief History of India, Facts on File, ISBN 978-0-8160-8143-1
- Wells, R. S. (2001). "The Eurasian Heartland: A continental perspective on Y-chromosome diversity". Proceedings of the National Academy of Sciences of the United States of America. 98 (18): 10244–10249. Bibcode:2001PNAS...9810244W. doi:10.1073/pnas.171305098. PMC 56946. PMID 11526236.
- Wells, Spencer; Read, Mark (2002), The Journey of Man: A Genetic Odyssey (illustrated ed.), Princeton University Press, ISBN 978-0-691-11532-0
- Wheeler, Mortimer (1967), De Indus-beschaving, Elsevier
- Witzel, Michael (1995), "Early Sanskritization: Origin and Development of the Kuru state" (PDF), Electronic Journal of Vedic Studies, 1 (4): 1–26, archived from the original (PDF) on 11 June 2007
- Witzel, Michael (1998), The Home of the Aryans. In: "Anusantatyi: Festschrift fuer Johanna Narten zum 70. Geburtstag", ed. A. Hinze and E. Tichy (Münchener Studien zur Sprachwissenschaft, Beihefte NF 19) Dettelbach: J. H. Roell 2000 (PDF)
- Witzel, Michael (1999). "Substrate Languages in Old Indo-Aryan (Ṛgvedic, Middle and Late Vedic)" (PDF). Electronic Journal of Vedic Studies. 5 (1). Archived from the original (PDF) on 6 February 2012.
- Witzel, Michael (2001). "Autochthonous Aryans? The Evidence from Old Indian and Iranian Texts" (PDF). Electronic Journal of Vedic Studies. 7 (3): 1–115.
- Witzel, Michael (December 2003), "Linguistic Evidence for Cultural Exchange in Prehistoric Western Central Asia" (PDF), Sino-Platonic Papers, 129: 1–70
- Witzel, Michael (2005). "Indocentrism". In Bryant, Edwin; Patton, Laurie L. (eds.). The Indo-Aryan Controversy. Evidence and inference in Indian history. Routledge.
- Witzel, Michael (2006). "Rama's realm: Indocentric rewritings of early South Asian archaeology and history". In Fagan, Garrett G. (ed.). Archaeological Fantasies: How Pseudoarchaeology Misrepresents the Past and Misleads the Public. London/New York: Routledge. pp. 203–232. ISBN 978-0-415-30592-1.
- Zimmer, Heinrich (1951). Philosophies of India. Princeton University Press.
