= Indigenous Aryanism =

View that the Indo-Aryans are indigenous to India

Indigenous Aryanism, also known as the Indigenous Aryans theory (IAT) and the Out of India theory (OIT), is the conviction that the Aryans are indigenous to the Indian subcontinent, and that the Indo-European languages radiated out from a homeland in India into their present locations. It is a "religio-nationalistic" view of Indian history, and propagated as an alternative to the established migration model, which considers the Pontic–Caspian steppe to be the area of origin of the Indo-European languages. (Note: Entry of the Indo-Aryans: * Lowe (2015, pp. 1–2): "... the eastward migration of the Indo-Aryan tribes from the mountains of what is today northern Afghanistan across the Punjab into north India." * Dyson (2018, pp. 14–15): "Although the collapse of the Indus valley civilization is no longer believed to have been due to an ‘Aryan invasion’ it is widely thought that, at roughly the same time, or perhaps a few centuries later, new Indo-Aryan-speaking people and influences began to enter the subcontinent from the north-west. Detailed evidence is lacking. Nevertheless, a predecessor of the language that would eventually be called Sanskrit was probably introduced into the north-west sometime between 3,900 and 3,000 years ago. This language was related to one then spoken in eastern Iran; and both of these languages belonged to the Indo-European language family." * Pinkney (2014, p. 38): "According to Asko Parpola, the Proto-Indo-Aryan civilization was influenced by two external waves of migrations. The first group originated from the southern Urals (c. 2100 BCE) and mixed with the peoples of the Bactria-Margiana Archaeological Complex (BMAC); this group then proceeded to South Asia, arriving around 1900 BCE. The second wave arrived in northern South Asia around 1750 BCE and mixed with the formerly arrived group, producing the Mitanni Aryans (c. 1500 BCE), a precursor to the peoples of the Ṛgveda.")

Reflecting traditional Indian views based on the Puranic chronology, indigenists propose an older date than is generally accepted for the Vedic period, and argue that the Indus Valley civilisation was a Vedic civilisation. In this view, "the Indian civilization must be viewed as an unbroken tradition that goes back to the earliest period of the Sindhu-Sarasvati (or Indus) tradition (7000 or 8000 BCE)."

Support for the IAT mostly exists among a subset of Indian scholars of Hindu religion and the history and archaeology of India, and plays a significant role in Hindutva politics. (Note: Wendy Doniger (2017), "Another Great Story"", review of Asko Parpola's The Roots of Hinduism; in: Inference, International Review of Science, Volume 3, Issue 2) (Note: Girish Shahane (September 14, 2019), Why Hindutva supporters love to hate the discredited Aryan Invasion Theory, Scroll.in) It has no relevance or support in mainstream scholarship. (Note: No support in mainstream scholarship: Mallory (2013): "The speakers at this symposium can generally be seen to support one of the following three ‘solutions’ to the Indo-European homeland problem: 1. The Anatolian Neolithic model [...] 2. The Near Eastern model [...] 3. The Pontic-Caspian model."; Romila Thapar (2006): "there is no scholar at this time seriously arguing for the indigenous origin of Aryans".; Wendy Doniger (2017): "The opposing argument, that speakers of Indo-European languages were indigenous to the Indian subcontinent, is not supported by any reliable scholarship. It is now championed primarily by Hindu nationalists, whose religious sentiments have led them to regard the theory of Aryan migration with some asperity."; Truschke (2020): "As Tony Joseph has pointed out, the Out of India theory lacks support from even “a single, peer-reviewed scientific paper” and is best considered nothing “more than a kind of clever and angry retort.”"; Girish Shahane (September 14, 2019), in response to Narasimhan et al. (2019): "Hindutva activists, however, have kept the Aryan Invasion Theory alive, because it offers them the perfect strawman, 'an intentionally misrepresented proposition that is set up because it is easier to defeat than an opponent's real argument' [...] The Out of India hypothesis is a desperate attempt to reconcile linguistic, archaeological and genetic evidence with Hindutva sentiment and nationalistic pride, but it cannot reverse time's arrow [...] The evidence keeps crushing Hindutva ideas of history."; Koenraad Elst (May 10, 2016): "Of course it is a fringe theory, at least internationally, where the Aryan Invasion Theory (AIT) is still the official paradigm. In India, though, it has the support of most archaeologists, who fail to find a trace of this Aryan influx and instead find cultural continuity.")

== Background ==
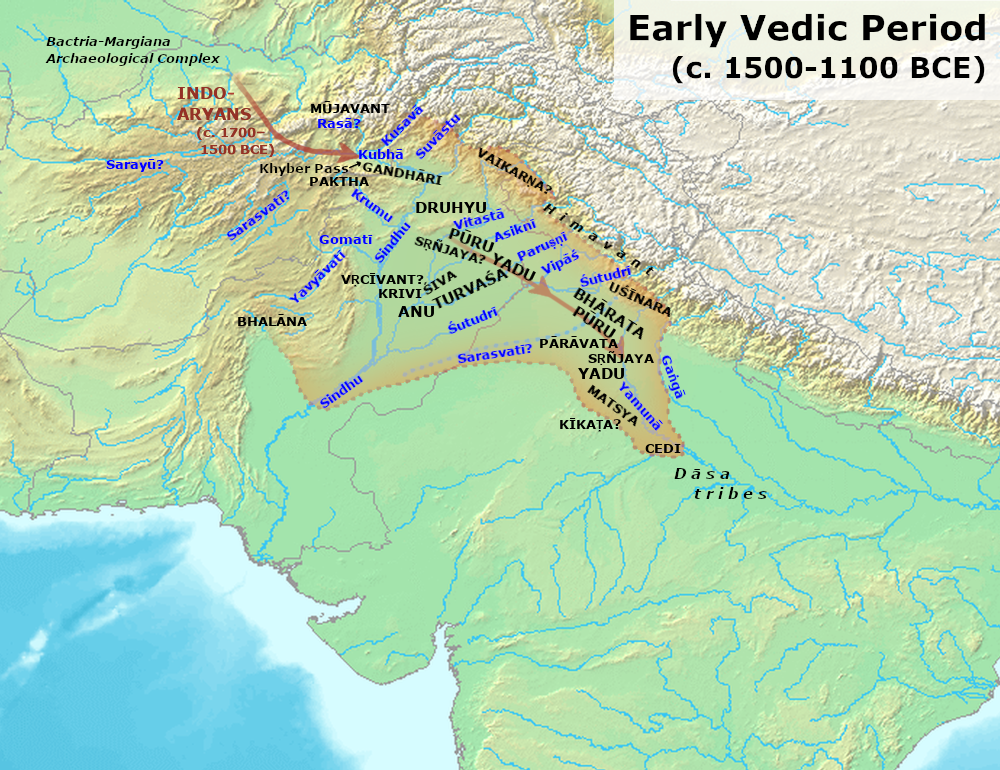
Early Vedic Culture (1700–1100 BCE)

The standard view on the origins of the Indo-Aryans is that of the Indo-Aryan migrations, which states that they entered north-western India at about 1500 BCE. The Puranic chronology, the timeline of events in ancient Indian history as narrated in the Mahabharata, the Ramayana, and the Puranas, envisions a much older chronology for the Vedic culture. In this view, the Vedas were received thousands of years ago, and the start of the reign of Vaivasvata Manu, the Manu of the current kalpa (aeon) and the progenitor of humanity, may be dated as far back 7350 BCE. The Kurukshetra War, the background-scene of the Bhagavad Gita, which may relate historical events taking place ca. 1000 BCE at the heartland of Āryāvarta, is dated in this chronology at ca. 3100 BCE.

Indigenists, reflecting traditional Indian views on history and religion, argue that the Aryans are indigenous to India, which challenges the standard view. In the 1980s and 1990s, the indigenous position has come to the foreground of the public debate.

=== Indian homeland and Aryan Invasion theory ===
In 19th century Indo-European studies, the language of the Rigveda was the most archaic Indo-European language known to scholars, indeed the only records of Indo-European that could reasonably claim to date to the Bronze Age. This primacy of Sanskrit inspired scholars such as Friedrich Schlegel, to assume that the locus of the proto-Indo-European homeland had been in India, with the other dialects spread to the west by historical migration. With the 20th-century discovery of Bronze Age attestations of Indo-European (Anatolian, Mycenaean Greek), Vedic Sanskrit lost its special status as the most archaic Indo-European language known.

In the 1850s, Max Müller introduced the notion of two Aryan races, a western and an eastern one, which migrated from the Caucasus into Europe and India respectively. Müller dichotomised the two groups, ascribing greater prominence and value to the western branch. Nevertheless, this "eastern branch of the Aryan race was more powerful than the indigenous eastern natives, who were easy to conquer." By the 1880s, his ideas had been adapted by racist ethnologists. For example, as an exponent of race science, colonial administrator Herbert Hope Risley (1851–1911) used the ratio of nose width to height to divide Indian people into Aryan and Dravidian races, as well as seven castes.

The idea of an Aryan "invasion" was fueled by the discovery of the Indus Valley (Harappan) Civilisation, which declined around the period of the Indo-Aryan migration, suggesting a destructive invasion. This argument was developed by the mid-20th century archaeologist Mortimer Wheeler, who interpreted the presence of many unburied corpses found in the top levels of Mohenjo-daro as the victims of conquests. He famously stated that the Vedic god "Indra stands accused" of the destruction of the Indus Civilisation. Scholarly critics have since argued that Wheeler misinterpreted his evidence and that the skeletons were better explained as hasty interments, not unburied victims of a massacre.

=== Indo-Aryan migration theory ===
==== Migrations ====
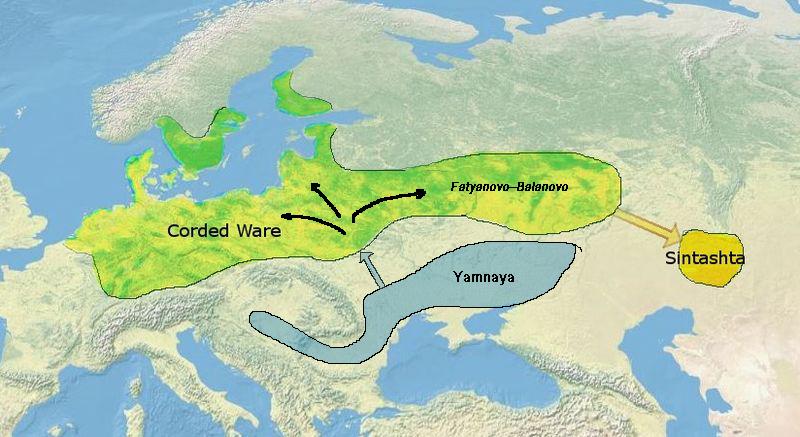
According to Allentoft (2015), the Sintashta culture probably derived from the Corded Ware Culture. The Sintashta Culture is commonly thought to be the first manifestation of the Indo-Iranians.

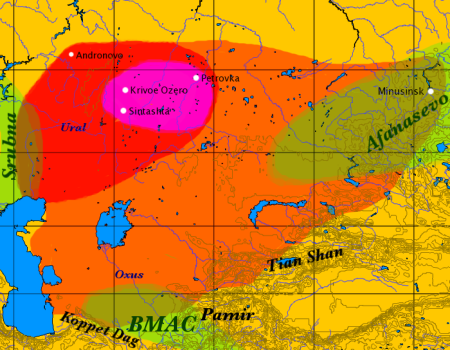
The Andronovo culture's approximate maximal extent, with the formative Sintashta-Petrovka culture (red), the location of the earliest spoke-wheeled chariot finds (purple), and the adjacent and overlapping Afanasevo, Srubna, and BMAC cultures (green).

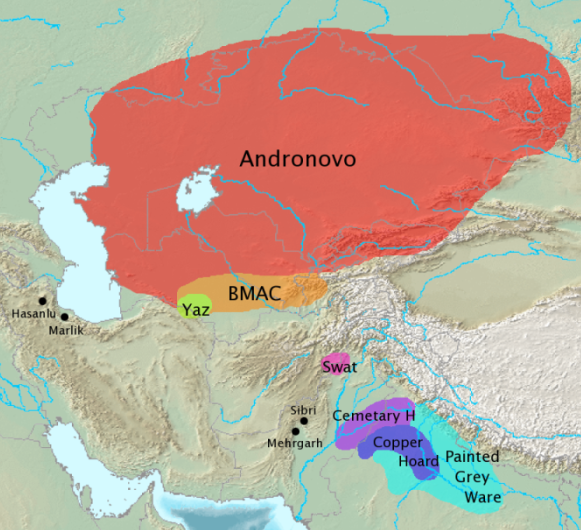
Archaeological cultures associated with Indo-Iranian migrations and Indo-Aryan migrations (after EIEC). The Andronovo, BMAC and Yaz cultures have often been associated with Indo-Iranian migrations. The GGC, Cemetery H, Copper Hoard and PGW cultures are candidates for cultures associated with Indo-Aryan migrations.

The idea of an "invasion" has been discarded in mainstream scholarship since the 1980s, and replaced by more sophisticated models, (Note: Witzel: "For some decades already, linguists and philologists such as Kuiper 1955, 1991, Emeneau 1956, Southworth 1979, archaeologists such as Allchin 1982, 1995, and historians such as R. Thapar 1968, have maintained that the Indo-Aryans and the older local inhabitants ('Dravidians', 'Mundas', etc.) have mutually interacted from early on, that many of them were in fact frequently bilingual, and that even the RV already bears witness to that. They also think, whether explicitly following Ehret's model (1988, cf. Diakonoff 1985) or not, of smaller infiltrating groups (Witzel 1989: 249, 1995, Allchin 1995), not of mass migrations or military invasions. However, linguists and philologists still maintain, and for good reasons, that some IA speaking groups actually entered from the outside, via some of the (north)western corridors of the subcontinent.") referred to as the Indo-Aryan migration theory. It posits the introduction of Indo-Aryan languages into South Asia through migrations of Indo-European-speaking people from their Urheimat (original homeland) in the Pontic Steppes via the Central European Corded ware culture, and Eastern European/Central Asian Sintashta culture, through Central Asia into the Levant (Mitanni), south Asia, and Inner Asia (Wusun and Yuezhi). It is part of the Kurgan-hypothesis/Revised Steppe Theory, which further describes the spread of Indo-European languages into western Europe via migrations of Indo-European speaking people.

Historical linguistics provides the main basis for the theory, analysing the development and changes of languages, and establishing relations between the various Indo-European languages, including the time frame of their development. It also provides information about shared words, and the corresponding area of the origin of Indo-European, and the specific vocabulary which is to be ascribed to specific regions. The linguistic analyses and data are supplemented with archaeological and genetical data (Note: The Ancient DNA revolution since about 2015, along with genome-wide techniques like Admixture Analysis and PCA has provided a fresh new perspective and large amounts of relevant data regarding the steppe migrations. For Europe, Corded Ware and later Bell Beaker cultures are now shown to be the result of large-scale steppe pastoralist takeovers which replaced the local genetics up to 75% and 90% respectively, while recent genetic research further confirmed the migration of Steppe pastoralists into Western Europe and South Asia. Even in areas where population turnover is lower, there is a marked sex bias in the resulting mixed population in favor of steppe males, such as in India.) and anthropological arguments, which together provide a coherent model that is widely accepted.

In the model, the first archaeological remains of the Indo-Europeans is the Yamnaya culture, from which emerged the Central European Corded Ware culture, which spread eastward creating the Proto-Indo-Iranian Sintashta culture (2100–1800 BCE), from which developed the Andronovo culture (1800–1400 BCE). Around 1800 BCE, Indo-Aryan people split-off from the Iranian branches, and migrated to the BMAC (2300–1700 BCE), and further to the Levant, northern India, and possibly Inner Asia.

==== Cultural continuity and adaptation ====
The migration into northern India was not necessarily of a large population, but may have consisted of small groups, who introduced their language and social system into the new territory when looking for pasture for their herds. These were then emulated by larger groups, (Note: David Anthony (1995): "Language shift can be understood best as a social strategy through which individuals and groups compete for positions of prestige, power, and domestic security […] What is important, then, is not just dominance, but vertical social mobility and a linkage between language and access to positions of prestige and power […] A relatively small immigrant elite population can encourage widespread language shift among numerically dominant indigenes in a non-state or pre-state context if the elite employs a specific combination of encouragements and punishments. Ethnohistorical cases […] demonstrate that small elite groups have successfully imposed their languages in non-state situations.") (Note: Witzel: "Just one "Afghan" IndoAryan tribe that did not return to the highlands but stayed in their Panjab winter quarters in spring was needed to set off a wave of acculturation in the plains, by transmitting its 'status kit' (Ehret) to its neighbors." […] "Actually, even this is, strictly speaking, not necessary. The constant interaction of "Afghan" highlanders and Indus plain agriculturists could have set off the process. A further opening was created when, after the collapse of the Indus Civilization, many of its people moved eastwards, thus leaving much of the Indus plains free for IA style cattle breeding. A few agricultural communities (especially along the rivers) nevertheless continued, something that the substrate agricultural vocabulary of the RV clearly indicates (Kuiper 1991, Witzel 1999a,b). In an acculturation scenario the actual (small) number of people (often used a 'clinching' argument by autochthonists) that set off the wave of adaptations does not matter: it is enough that the 'status kit' (Ehret) of the innovative group (the pastoralist Indo-Aryans) was copied by some neighboring populations, and then spread further.) who adopted the new language and culture. (Note: Thomason and Kaufman note that Dravidian features in Sanskrit and later Indic languages may be explained by "absorption". They quote Emeneau: "absorption, not displacement, is the chief mechanism in radical language changes of the kind we are considering." Thomason and Kaufman note that a basic assumption is that Dravidians shifted in considerable numbers, so they could not only impose their own habits on Indic, but were also numerous enough to influence Indic as a whole.) Witzel also notes that "small-scale semi-annual transhumance movements between the Indus plains and the Afghan and Baluchi highlands continue to this day."

== Indigenous Aryanism ==
According to Bryant, Indigenists

... share a conviction that the theory of an external origin of the Indo-Aryan speaking people on the Indian subcontinent has been constructed on flimsy or false assumptions and conjectures. As far as such scholars are concerned, no compelling evidence has yet been produced to posit an external origin of the Indo-Aryans [...] they have taken it upon themselves to oppose the theory of Aryan invasions and migrations—hence the label Indigenous Aryanism.

The "Indigenist position" started to take shape after the discovery of the Harappan civilisation, which predates the Vedas. According to this alternative view, the Aryans are indigenous to India, the Indus Civilisation is the Vedic Civilisation, the Vedas are older than the second millennium BCE, there is no discontinuity between the (northern) Indo-European part of India and the (southern) Dravidian part, and the Indo-European languages radiated out from a homeland in India into their present locations. According to Bresnan, it is a natural response to the 19th century narrative of a superior Aryan race subjecting the native Indians, implicitly confirming the ethnocentric superiority of the European invaders of colonial times, instead supporting "a theory of indigenous development that led to the creation of the Vedas."

=== Main arguments of the Indigenists ===
The idea of "Indigenous Aryans" is supported with specific interpretations of archaeological, genetic, and linguistic data, and on literal interpretations of the Rigveda. Standard arguments, both in support of the "Indigenous Aryans" theory and in opposition the mainstream Indo-Aryan Migration theory, are:

- Questioning the Indo-Aryan Migration theory:
  - Presenting the Indo-Aryan Migration theory as an "Indo-Aryan Invasion theory", (Note: The term "invasion" is only being used nowadays by opponents of the Indo-Aryan Migration theory. The term "invasion" does not reflect the contemporary scholarly understanding of the Indo-Aryan migrations; and is merely being used in a polemical and distracting way.) which was invented by 19th century colonialists to suppress the Indian people.
  - Questioning the methodology of linguistics;
  - Arguing for an indigenous cultural continuity, arguing there is a lack of archaeological remains of the Indo-Aryans in north-west India;
  - Questioning the genetic evidence (Note: Dinsa Sachan (4 July 2015), Aryan invasion debunked. Genetic study shows South Asians have a diverse ancestry) (Note: A.L. Chavda (05-05-2017), Aryan Invasion Myth: How 21st Century Science Debunks 19th Century Indology)
  - Contesting the possibility that small groups can change culture and languages in a major way;
- Re-dating India's history by postulating a Vedic-Puranic chronology:
  - Arguing for ancient, indigenous origins of Sanskrit, dating the Rigveda and the Vedic people to the 3rd millennium BCE or earlier; This includes:
    - Identifying the Saraswati River, described in the Rig Veda as a mighty river, with the Ghaggar-Hakra River, which had dried up c. 2000 BCE, arguing therefore for an earlier dating of the Rig Veda;
    - Arguing for the presence of horses and horse-drawn chariots before 2000 BCE;
  - Identifying the Vedic people with the Harappan civilisation;
  - Redating Indian history based on the Vedic-Puranic chronology.

=== Questioning the Aryan Migration model ===
==== Rhetorics of "Aryan invasion" ====
The outdated notion of an "Aryan invasion" has been used as a straw man to attack the Indo-Aryan Migration theory. According to Witzel, the invasion model was criticised by Indigenous Aryanists for being a justification for colonial rule:

The theory of an immigration of IA speaking Arya ("Aryan invasion") is simply seen as a means of British policy to justify their own intrusion into India and their subsequent colonial rule: in both cases, a "white race" was seen as subduing the local darker colored population.

While according to Koenraad Elst, a supporter of Indigenous Aryans:

The theory of which we are about to discuss the linguistic evidence, is widely known as the "Aryan invasion theory" (AIT). I will retain this term even though some scholars object to it, preferring the term "immigration" to "invasion." ... North India's linguistic landscape leaves open only two possible explanations: either Indo-Aryan was native, or it was imported in an invasion. (Note: Koenraad Elst: "The theory of which we are about to discuss the linguistic evidence, is widely known as the "Aryan invasion theory" (AIT). I will retain this term even though some scholars object to it, preferring the term "immigration" to "invasion." They argue that the latter term represents a long-abandoned theory of Aryan warrior bands attacking and subjugating the peaceful Indus civilization. This dramatic scenario, popularized by Sir Mortimer Wheeler, had white marauders from the northwest enslave the black aboriginals, so that "Indra stands accused" of destroying the Harappan civilization. Only the extremist fringe of the Indian Dalit (ex-Untouchable) movement and its Afrocentric allies in the USA now insist on this black-and-white narrative (vide Rajshekar 1987; Biswas 1995). But, for this once, I believe the extremists have a point. North India's linguistic landscape leaves open only two possible explanations: either Indo-Aryan was native, or it was imported in an invasion. In fact, scratch any of these emphatic "immigration" theorists and you'll find an old-school invasionist, for they never fail to connect Aryan immigration with horses and spoked-wheel chariots, that is, with factors of military superiority.)

==== Linguistic methodology ====
Indigenists question the methodology and results of linguistics. According to Bryant, OIT proponents tend to be linguistic dilettantes who either ignore the linguistic evidence completely, dismiss it as highly speculative and inconclusive, (Note: E.g. Chakrabarti 1995 and Rajaram 1995, as cited in Bryant 2001.) or attempt to tackle it with hopelessly inadequate qualifications; this attitude and neglect significantly minimises the value of most OIT publications.

==== Archaeological finds and cultural continuity ====
In the 1960s, archaeological explanations for cultural change shifted from migration-models to internal causes of change. Given the lack of archaeological remains of the Indo-Aryans, Jim G. Shaffer, writing in the 1980s and 1990s, has argued for an indigenous cultural continuity between Harappan and post-Harappan times. According to Shaffer, there is no archaeological indication of an Aryan migration into northwestern India during or after the decline of the Harappan city culture. (Note: David Anthony, in his The Horse, the Wheel, and Language, has provided an extensive overview of the archaeological trail of the Indo-European people across the Eurasian steppes and central Asia.) Instead, Shaffer has argued for "a series of cultural changes reflecting indigenous cultural developments." According to Shaffer, linguistic change has mistakenly been attributed to migrations of people. (Note: While arguing for an indigenous cultural continuity, Shaffer gives two possible alternative explanations for the similarities between Sanskrit and western languages, arguing for non-Indian origins.: 1. The first is a linguistic relationship with a "Zagrosian family of language linking Elamite and Dravidian on the Iranian Plateau," as proposed by McAlpin. According to Shaffer "linguistic similarities may have diffused west from the plateau as a result of the extensive trading networks linking cultures in the plateau with those in Mesopotamia and beyond," while also linking with the Kelteminar culture in Central Asia. Yet, Shaffer also notes that the Harappan culture was not extensively tied to this network in the third millennium BCE, leaving the possibility that "membership in a basic linguistic family - Zagrosian - may account for some of the linguistic similarities of later periods." (Note: According to Franklin Southworth, "The Dravidian languages, now spoken mainly in peninsular India, form one of two main branches of the Zagrosian language family, whose other main branch consists of Elamitic and Brahui."); 2. The second possibility is that "such linguistic similarities are a result of post-second millennium B.C. contacts with the west" by trade, taken over by people who also adopted a new way of societal organisation. This language was used to record the myths preserved in the Vedas. According to Shaffer, "[o]nce codified, it was advantageous for the emerging hereditary social elites to stabilize such linguistic traits with the validity of the explanations offered in the literature enhancing their social position.") Likewise, Erdosy also notes the absence of evidence for migrations, and states that "Indo-European languages may well have spread to South Asia through migration," but that the Rigvedic aryas, as a specific ethno-linguistic tribe holding a specific set of ideas, (Note: Parpola, as referred to by Bronkhorst, also notes that the term arya may not have referred to all ethnic groups who spoke an Indo-Aryan language.) may well have been indigenous people whose "set of ideas" soon spread over India.

Since the 1990s, attention has shifted back to migrations as an explanatory model. Pastoral societies are difficult to identify in the archaeological record, since they move around in small groups and leave little traces. (Note: Encyclopedia Britannica, Emergence of the pastoral way of life) In 1990, David Anthony published a defense of migratory models, and in his The Horse, the Wheel, and Language (2007), has provided an extensive overview of the archaeological trail of the Indo-European people across the Eurasian steppes and central Asia. The development and "revolutionary" improvement of genetic research since the early 2010s has reinforced this shift in focus, as it has unearthed previously unaccessible data, showing large-scale migrations in prehistoric times.

==== Genetic evidence ====
OIT-proponents have questioned the findings of genetic research, and some older DNA-research had questioned the Indo-Aryan migrations. Since 2015 however, genetic research has "revolutionarily" improved, and further confirmed the migration of Steppe pastoralists into Western Europe and South Asia, (Note: See, among others: Lazaridis et al. (2016),Silva et al. (2017), Narasimhan et al. (2019)) and "many scientists who were either sceptical or neutral about significant Bronze Age migrations into India have changed their opinions." (Note: While Shinde et al. (2019), published in Cell, confirmed the Indo-Aryan migrations, news-reports stated that the study proved the Indo-Aryan migration theory to be wrong. (Note: Pratul Sharma (6 september 2019), New DNA study debunks Aryan invasion theory, The Week) (Note: The Times of India (7 september 2019), DNA analysis of Rakhigarhi remains challenges Aryan invasion theory) This suggestion was reinforced by Shinde himself and Niraj Rai, stating that their study "completely sets aside the Aryan Migration/Invasion Theory." (Note: Shoaib Daniyal (9 september 2019), Two new genetic studies upheld Indo-Aryan migration. So why did Indian media report the opposite?, Scroll.in) (Note: C.P. Rajendran (13 september 2019), Scientists Part of Studies Supporting Aryan Migration Endorse Party Line Instead, The Wire) Shinde's statements were refuted by his co-author Nick Patterson, and by Vagheesh Narasimhan, Shinde's co-author on Narasimhan et al. (2019), and met with scepticism in other news reports. David Reich repeated that Steppe people contributed to the genetic make-up of India, (Note: Anubhuti Vishnoi (9 september 2019),Indus Valley Civilisation is largest source of ancestry for South Asians: David Reich, The Economic Times) while Friese (2019) commented on the political complications of doing genetic research on India's history.)

==== Cultural change ====
Indigenists contest the possibility that small groups can change culture and languages in a major way. Mainstream scholarship explains this by elite dominance and language shift. Small groups can change a larger cultural area, when an elite male group integrates in small indigenous groups which takes over the elite language, in this case leading to a language shift in northern India. Indo-Aryan languages were further disseminated with the spread of the Vedic-Brahmanical culture in the process of Sanskritisation. In this process, local traditions ("little traditions") became integrated into the "great tradition" of Brahmanical religion, disseminating Sanskrit texts and Brahmanical ideas throughout India, and abroad. This facilitated the development of the Hindu synthesis, in which the Brahmanical tradition absorbed "local popular traditions of ritual and ideology."

=== Redating Indian history ===
==== Redating the Rig Veda and the Rig Vedic people ====
===== Sanskrit =====
According to the mainstream view, Sanskrit arose in South Asia after Indo-Aryan languages had been introduced by the Indo-Aryans in the first half of the second millennium BCE. The most archaic form of Sanskrit is Vedic Sanskrit found in the Rig Veda, composed between 1500 BCE and 1200 BCE. (Note: Vedas: * Lowe (2015, pp. 1–2): "It consists of 1,028 hymns (suktas), highly crafted poetic compositions originally intended for recital during rituals and for the invocation of and communication with the Indo-Aryan gods. Modern scholarly opinion largely agrees that these hymns were composed between around 1500 BCE and 1200 BCE, during the eastward migration of the Indo-Aryan tribes from the mountains of what is today northern Afghanistan across the Punjab into north India." * Witzel (2006b, pp. 158–190, 160): "The Vedas were composed (roughly between 1500-1200 and 500 BCE) in parts of present-day Afghanistan, northern Pakistan, and northern India. The oldest text at our disposal is the Rgveda (RV); it is composed in archaic Indo-Aryan (Vedic Sanskrit)." * Pinkney (2014, p. 38): " Michael Witzel has assigned an approximate chronology to the strata of Vedic languages, arguing that the language of the Ṛgveda changed through the beginning of the Iron Age in South Asia, which started in the Northwest (Punjab) around 1000 BCE. On the basis of comparative philological evidence, Witzel has suggested a five-stage periodization of Vedic civilization, beginning with the Ṛgveda. On the basis of internal evidence, the Ṛgveda is dated as a late Bronze Age text composed by pastoral migrants with limited settlements, probably between 1350 and 1150 BCE in the Punjab region.")

Taking recourse to "Hindu astronomical lore" Indigenists argue for ancient, indigenous origins of Sanskrit, dating the Rigveda and the Vedic people to the 3rd millennium BCE or earlier. (Note: See Kak (1987); Kak (1996), Kazanas (2001); Kazanas (2002) Elst (1999): "The astronomical lore in Vedic literature provides elements of an absolute chronology in a consistent way. For what it is worth, this corpus of astronomical indications suggests that the Rg-Veda was completed in the 4th millennium AD, that the core text of the Mahabharata was composed at the end of that millennium, and that the Brahmanas and Sutras are products of the high Harappan period towards the end of the 3rd millennium BC. This corpus of evidence is hard to reconcile with the AIT, and has been standing as a growing challenge to the AIT defenders for two centuries.") According to Subhash Kak, situating the arrival of the Aryans in the seventh millennium BCE, the hymns of the Rig Veda are organised in accordance with an astronomical code, supposedly showing "a tradition of sophisticated observational astronomy going back to events of 3000 or 4000 BCE." His ideas have been rejected by mainstream scholars.

===== Horses and chariots =====
Several archaeological finds are interpreted as evidencing the presence of typical Indo-Aryan artefacts before 2000 BCE. Examples include the interpretation of animal bones from before 2000 BCE as horse-bones, and interpreting the Sinauli cart burials as chariots. (Note: Shoaib Daniyal (2018), Putting the horse before the cart: What the discovery of 4,000-year-old ‘chariot’ in UP signifies, Scroll.in) (Note: Devdutt Pattanaik (2020), Who is a Hindu? The missing horse of Baghpat, MumbaiMirror) (Note: These carts dubbed as "chariots" does not however have any spokes on the wheels like the chariots(Sanskrit: Ratha) mentioned in Vedic literature.) While horse remains and related artifacts have been found in Late Harappan (1900-1300 BCE) sites, indicating that horses may have been present at Late Harappan times, horses did not play an essential role in the Harappan civilisation, in contrast to the Vedic period (1500-500 BCE). (Note: R.S. Sharma (1995), as quoted in Bryant 2001: "the Rg Vedic culture was pastoral and horse-centered, while the Harappan culture was neither horse-centered nor pastoral.") The earliest undisputed finds of horse remains in South Asia are from the Gandhara grave culture, also known as the Swat culture (c. 1400-800 BCE), related to the Indo-Aryans.

Horse remains from the Harappan site Surkotada (dated to 2400-1700 BC) have been identified by A.K. Sharma as Equus ferus caballus. (Note: Sharma (1974), as cited in Bryant 2001, p. 271) (Note: Bökönyi, as cited by B. B. Lal, stated that "The occurrence of true horse (Equus caballus L.) was evidenced by the enamel pattern of the upper and lower cheek and teeth and by the size and form of incisors and phalanges (toe bones)."Lal 1998, p. 111, quoted from Bökönyi's letter to the Director of the Archaeological Survey of India, 1993-12-13.) However, archaeologists like Meadow (1997) disagree, on the grounds that the remains of the Equus ferus caballus horse are difficult to distinguish from other equid species such as Equus asinus (donkeys) or Equus hemionus (onagers).

Bronze Age solid-disk wheel carts were found at Sinauli in 2018. They were related to the Ochre Coloured Pottery culture, and dated at ca. 2000-1800 BCE. They were interpreted by some as horse-pulled "chariots", predating the arrival of the horse-centered Indo-Aryans. According to Parpola, the carts were ox-pulled charts, and related to a first wave of Indo-Iranian migrations into the Indian subcontinent, noting that the Ochre Coloured Pottery culture (2000-1500 BCE) shows similarities with both the Late Harappan culture and steppe-cultures.

===== Sarasvati river =====
In the Rig Veda, the goddess Sarasvati is described as a mighty river. Indigenists take these descriptions as references to a real river, the Sarasvati river, identified with the Ghaggar-Hakra, an eastern tributary to the Indus. Given the fact that the Ghaggar-Hakkra had dried-up at 2000 BCE, Indigenists argue that the Vedic people must therefore have been present much earlier.

Rig Vedic references to a physical river indicate that the Sarswati "had already lost its main source of water supply and must have ended in a terminal lake (samudra)," "depicting the present-day situation, with the Sarasvatī having lost most of its water." (Note: Witzel: "The autochthonous theory overlooks that RV 3.33206 already speaks of a necessarily smaller Sarasvatī: the Sudås hymn 3.33 refers to the confluence of the Beas and Sutlej (Vipåś, Śutudrī). This means that the Beas had already captured the Sutlej away from the Sarasvatī, dwarfing its water supply. While the Sutlej is fed by Himalayan glaciers, the Sarsuti is but a small local river depending on rain water. In sum, the middle and later RV (books 3, 7 and the late book, 10.75) already depict the present-day situation, with the Sarasvatī having lost most of its water to the Sutlej (and even earlier, much of it also to the Yamunå). It was no longer the large river it might have been before the early Rgvedic period.) "Sarasvati" may also be identified with the Helmand or Haraxvati river in southern Afghanistan, the name of which may have been reused in its Sanskrit form as the name of the Ghaggar-Hakra river, after the Vedic tribes moved to the Punjab. (Note: The Helmand river historically, besides Avestan Haetumant, bore the name Haraxvaiti, which is the Avestan form cognate to Sanskrit Sarasvati.) Sarasvati of the Rig Veda may also refer to two distinct rivers, with the family books referring to the Helmand River, and the more recent 10th mandala referring to the Ghaggar-Hakra.

==== Identifying the Vedic people with the Harappan civilisation ====
Indigenists claim a continuous cultural evolution of India, denying a discontinuity between the Harappan and Vedic periods, identifying the IVC with the Vedic people. According to Kak, "the Indian civilization must be viewed as an unbroken tradition that goes back to the earliest period of the Sindhu-Sarasvati (or Indus) tradition (7000 or 8000 BCE)." (Note: See also Kak 1996) This identification is incompatible with the archaeological, linguistic and genetic data, and rejected by mainstream scholarship.

==== Postulating a Puranic chronology ====
The idea of "Indigenous Aryanism" fits into traditional Hindu ideas of religious history, namely that Hinduism has timeless origins, with the Vedic Aryans inhabiting India since ancient times. (Note: The Vedic Foundation states: "The history of Bharatvarsh (which is now called India) is the description of the timeless glory of the Divine dignitaries who not only Graced the soils of India with their presence and Divine intelligence, but they also showed and revealed the true path of peace, happiness and the Divine enlightenment for the souls of the world that still is the guideline for the true lovers of God who desire to taste the sweetness of His Divine love in an intimate style." (Note: The Vedic Foundation, Introduction)) The Indigenist ideas are rooted in the chronology of the Puranas, the Mahabharata and the Ramayana, which contain lists of kings and genealogies used to construct the traditional chronology of ancient India. "Indigenists" follow a "Puranic agenda", emphasising that these lists go back to the fourth millennium BCE. Megasthenes, the Greek ambassador to the Maurya court at Patna at c. 300 BCE, reported to have heard of a traditional list of 153 kings that covered 6042 years, beyond the traditional beginning of the Kali Yuga in 3102 BCE. The royal lists are based on Sūta bardic traditions, and are derived from lists which were orally transmitted and constantly reshaped.

These lists are supplemented with astronomical interpretations, which are also used to reach an earlier dating for the Rigveda. Along with this comes a redating of historical personages and events, in which the Buddha is dated to 1100 BCE or even 1700 BCE, and Chandragupta Maurya (c. 300 BCE) is replaced by Chandragupta, the Gupta king. (Note: Witzel calls these "absurd dates", and refers to Elst 1999, Update on the Aryan Invasion Debate, p.97 for more of them. Elst: "It is not only the Vedic age which is moved a number of centuries deeper into the past, when comparing the astronomical indications with the conventional chronology. Even the Gupta age (and implicitly the earlier ages of the Buddha, the Mauryas etc.) could be affected. Indeed, the famous playwright and poet Kalidasa, supposed to have worked at the Gupta court in about 400 AD, wrote that the monsoon rains started at the start of the sidereal month of Ashadha; this timing of the monsoon was accurate in the last centuries BCE. This implicit astronomy-based chronology of Kalidasa, about 5 centuries higher than the conventional one, tallies well with the traditional high chronology of the Buddha, whom Chinese Buddhist tradition dates to c. 1100 BC, and the implicit Puranic chronology even to c. 1700 BC. Elst 1999 2.3 note 17: "The argument for a higher chronology (by about 6 centuries) for the Guptas as well as for the Buddha has been elaborated by K.D. Sethna in Ancient India in New Light, Aditya Prakashan, Delhi 1989. The established chronology starts from the uncertain assumption that the Sandrokottos/ Chandragupta whom Megasthenes met was the Maurya rather than the Gupta king of that name. This hypothetical synchronism is known as the sheet-anchor of Indian chronology.) The Bharata War is dated at 3139–38 BCE, the start of the kali Yuga. (Note: Elst: "In August 1995, a gathering of 43 historians and archaeologists from South-Indian universities (at the initiative of Prof. K.M. Rao, Dr. N. Mahalingam and Dr. S.D. Kulkarni) passed a resolution fixing the date of the Bharata war at 3139–38 BC and declaring this date to be the true sheet anchor of Indian chronology." The Indic Studies Foundation reports of another meeting in 2003: "Scholars from across the world came together, for the first time, in an attempt to establish the 'Date of Kurukshetra War based on astronomical data.'")

== Indigenous Aryans scenarios ==
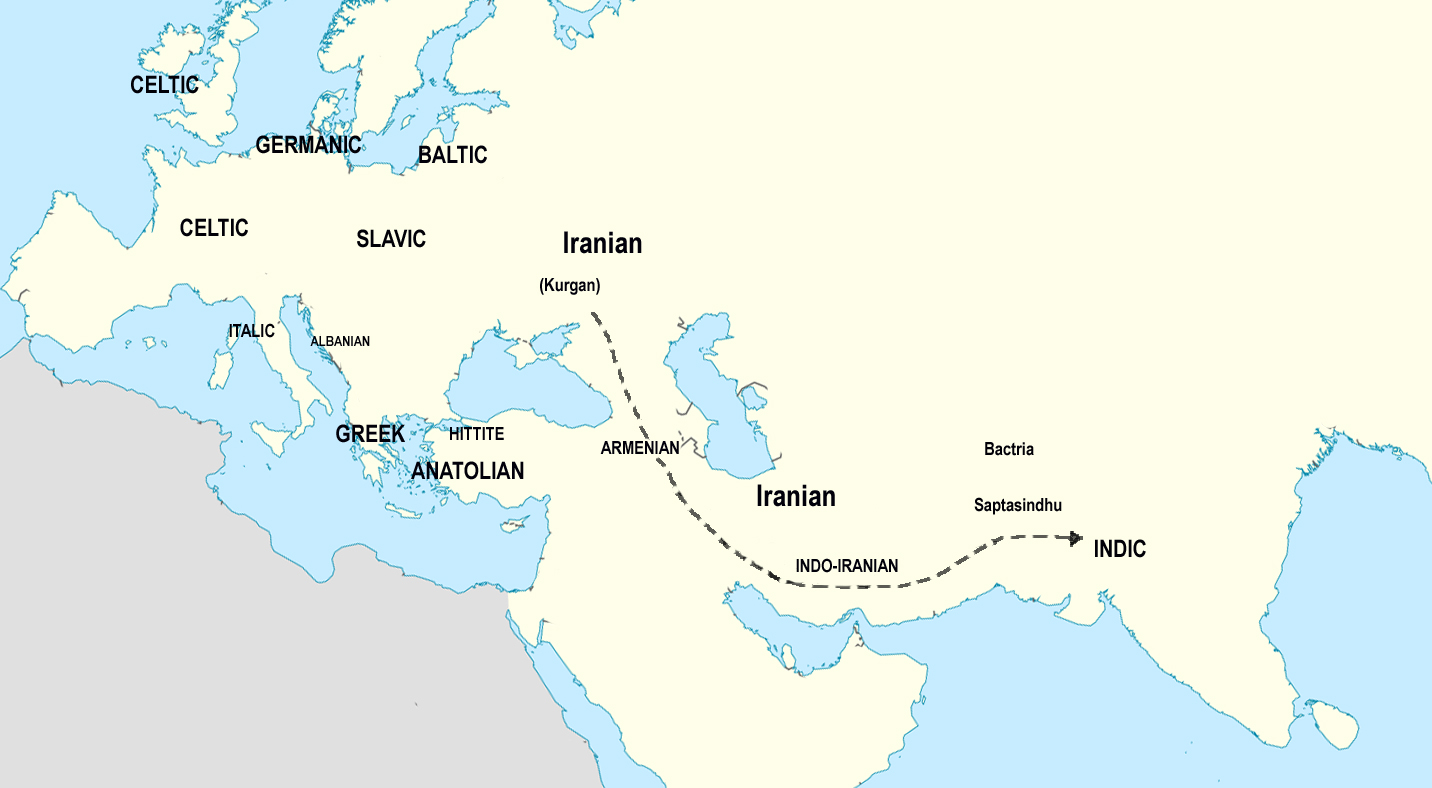
Indo-Iranian migrations according to Kazanas.

Michael Witzel identifies three major types of "Indigenous Aryans" scenarios:

1. A "mild" version that insists on the indigeneity of the Rigvedic Aryans to the North-Western region of the Indian subcontinent in the tradition of Aurobindo and Dayananda; (Note: Witzel mentions: Aurobindo (no specific source); Waradpande, N.R., "Fact and fictions about the Aryans." In: Deo and Kamath 1993, 14-19; Waradpande, N.R., "The Aryan Invasion, a Myth." Nagpur: Baba Saheb Apte Smarak Samiti 1989; S. Kak 1994a, "On the classification of Indic languages." Annals of the Bhandarkar Oriental Research Institute 75, 1994a, 185-195.; Elst 1999, "Update on the Aryan Invasion Debate." Delhi: Aditya Prakashan. p.119; Talageri 2000, "Rigveda. A Historical Analysis." New Delhi: Aditya Prakashan, p.406 sqq, Lal 1997, "The Earliest Civilization of South Asia (Rise, Maturity and Decline)." New Delhi: Aryan Books International, p.281 sqq.)

2. The "out of India" school that posits India as the Proto-Indo-European homeland, originally proposed in the 18th century, revived by the Hindutva sympathiser Koenraad Elst (1999), and further popularised within Hindu nationalism by Shrikant Talageri (2000); (Note: In any "Indigenous Aryan" scenario, speakers of Indo-European languages must have left India at some point prior to the 10th century BCE, when first mention of Iranian peoples is made in Assyrian records, but likely before the 16th century BCE, before the emergence of the Yaz culture which is often identified as a Proto-Iranian culture. (See, e.g., Roman Ghirshman, L'Iran et la migration des Indo-aryens et des Iraniens).)

3. The position that all the world's languages and civilisations derive from India, represented e.g. by David Frawley.

Kazanas adds a fourth scenario:

4.The Aryans entered the Indus Valley before 4500 BCE and got integrated with the Harappans, or might have been the Harappans.

=== Aurobindo's Aryan world-view ===
For Aurobindo, an "Aryan" was not a member of a particular race, but a person who "accepted a particular type of self-culture, of inward and outward practice, of ideality, of aspiration." Aurobindo wanted to revive India's strength by reviving Aryan traditions of strength and character. He denied the historicity of a racial division in India between "Aryan invaders" and a native dark-skinned population. Nevertheless, he did accept two kinds of culture in ancient India, namely the Aryan culture of northern and central India and Afghanistan, and the un-Aryan culture of the east, south and west. Thus, he accepted the cultural aspects of the division suggested by European historians.

=== Out of India model ===
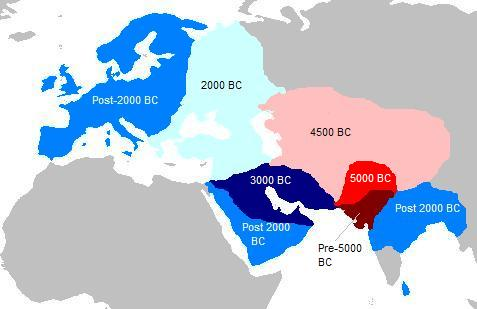
Map showing the spread of the Proto-Indo-European language from the Indus Valley. Dates are those of the "emerging non-invasionist model" according to Elst.

The "Out of India theory" (OIT), also known as the "Indian Urheimat theory," is the proposition that the Indo-European language family originated in Northern India and spread to the remainder of the Indo-European region through a series of migrations. It implies that the people of the Harappan civilisation were linguistically Indo-Aryans.

==== Theoretical overview ====
Koenraad Elst, in his Update in the Aryan Invasion Debate (1999), investigates "the developing arguments concerning the Aryan Invasion Theory". Elst notes:

Personally, I don't think that either theory, of Aryan invasion and of Aryan indigenousness, can claim to have been proven by prevalent standards of proof; even though one of the contenders is getting closer. Indeed, while I have enjoyed pointing out the flaws in the AIT statements of the politicized Indian academic establishment and its American amplifiers, I cannot rule out the possibility that the theory which they are defending may still have its merits.

Edwin Bryant also notes that Elst's model is a "theoretical exercise:"

...a purely theoretical linguistic exercise […] as an experiment to determine whether India can definitively be excluded as a possible homeland. If it cannot, then this further problematizes the possibility of a homeland ever being established anywhere on linguistic grounds.

And in Indo-Aryan Controversy Bryant notes:

Elst, perhaps more in a mood of devil's advocacy, toys with the evidence to show how it can be reconfigured, and to claim that no linguistic evidence has yet been produced to exclude India as a homeland that cannot be reconfigured to promote it as such.

==== "The emerging alternative" ====
Koenraad Elst summarises "the emerging alternative to the Aryan Invasion Theory" as follows.

During the 6th millennium BCE, Proto-Indo-Europeans lived in the Punjab region of northern India. As the result of demographic expansion, they spread into Bactria as the Kambojas. The Paradas moved further and inhabited the Caspian coast and much of central Asia while the Cinas moved northwards and inhabited the Tarim Basin in northwestern China, forming the Tocharian group of I-E speakers. These groups were Proto-Anatolian and inhabited that region by 2000 BCE. These people took the oldest form of the Proto-Indo-European (PIE) language with them and, while interacting with people of the Anatolian and Balkan region, transformed it into a separate dialect. While inhabiting central Asia they discovered the uses of the horse, which they later sent back to the Urheimat. Later on during their history, they went on to occupy western Europe and thus spread the Indo-European languages to that region.

During the 4th millennium BCE, civilisation in India started evolving into what became the urban Indus Valley civilisation. During this time, the PIE languages evolved to Proto-Indo-Iranian. Some time during this period, the Indo-Iranians began to separate as the result of internal rivalry and conflict, with the Iranians expanding westwards towards Mesopotamia and Persia, these possibly were the Pahlavas. They also expanded into parts of central Asia. By the end of this migration, India was left with the Proto-Indo-Aryans. At the end of the Mature Harappan period, the Sarasvati river began drying up and the remainder of the Indo-Aryans split into separate groups. Some travelled westwards and established themselves as rulers of the Hurrian Mitanni kingdom by around 1500 BCE (see Indo-Aryan superstrate in Mitanni). Others travelled eastwards and inhabited the Gangetic basin while others travelled southwards and interacted with the Dravidian people.

=== David Frawley ===
In books such as The Myth of the Aryan Invasion of India and In Search of the Cradle of Civilization (1995), Frawley criticises the 19th century racial interpretations of Indian prehistory, such as the theory of conflict between invading Caucasoid Aryans and Dravidians. In the latter book, Frawley, Georg Feuerstein, and Subhash Kak reject the Aryan Invasion theory and support Out of India.

Bryant commented that Frawley's historical work is more successful as a popular work, where its impact "is by no means insignificant", rather than as an academic study, and that Frawley "is committed to channelling a symbolic spiritual paradigm through a critical empirico rational one".

Pseudo-historian Graham Hancock (2002) quotes Frawley's historical work extensively for the proposal of highly evolved ancient civilisations prior to the end of the last glacial period. including in India. Kreisburg refers to Frawley's "The Vedic Literature and Its Many Secrets".

== Significance for colonial rule and Hindu politics ==
The Aryan Invasion theory plays an important role in Hindu nationalism, which favors Indigenous Aryanism.

=== In colonial India ===
Curiosity and the colonial requirements of knowledge about their subject people led the officials of the East India Company to explore the history and culture of India in the late 18th century. When similarities between Sanskrit, Greek and Latin were discovered by William Jones, a suggestion of "monogenesis" (single origin) was formulated for these languages as well as their speakers. In the latter part of the 19th century, it was thought that language, culture and race were inter-related, and the notion of biological race came to the forefront The presumed "Aryan race" which originated the Indo-European languages was prominent among such races, and was deduced to be further subdivided into "European Aryans" and "Asian Aryans," each with their own homelands.

Max Mueller, who translated the Rigveda during 1849–1874, postulated an original homeland for all Aryans in central Asia, from which a northern branch migrated to Europe and a southern branch to India and Iran. The Aryans were presumed to be fair-complexioned Indo-European speakers who conquered the dark-skinned dasas of India. The upper castes, particularly the Brahmins, were thought to be of Aryan descent whereas the lower castes and Dalits ("untouchables") were thought to be the descendants of dasas.

The Aryan migration theory served politically to suggest a common ancestry and dignity between the Indians and the British. Keshab Chunder Sen spoke of British rule in India as a "reunion of parted cousins." Indian nationalist Bal Gangadhar Tilak endorsed the antiquity of Rigveda, dating it to 4500 BCE. He placed the homeland of the Aryans somewhere close to the North Pole. From there, Aryans were believed to have migrated south in the post-glacial age, branching into a European branch that relapsed into barbarism and an Indian branch that retained the original, superior civilisation.

Christian missionaries such as John Muir and John Wilson highlighted what they saw as the oppression of lower castes by upper castes, which they attributed to the Aryan invasions. Jyotiba Phule argued that the dasas and sudras were indigenous to the land, whereas Brahmins were Aryan and outsiders.

=== Hindu revivalism and nationalism ===
In contrast to the mainstream views, the Hindu revivalist movements denied an external origin to Aryans. Dayananda Saraswati, the founder of the Arya Samaj (Society of Aryans), held that Vedas were the source of all knowledge and were revealed to the Aryans. The first man (an Aryan) was created in Tibet and, after living there for some time, the Aryans came down and inhabited India, which was previously empty.

The Theosophical Society held that the Aryans were indigenous to India, but that they were also the progenitors of the European civilisation. The Society saw a dichotomy between the spiritualism of India and the materialism of Europe.

According to Romila Thapar, the Hindu nationalists, eager to construct a Hindu identity for the nation, held that the original Hindus were the Aryans and that they were indigenous to India. There was no Aryan invasion and no conflict among the people of India. The Aryans spoke Sanskrit and spread the Aryan civilisation from India to the west. However, Hindutva creator V. D. Savarkar believed that Aryans migrated to South Asia.

Witzel traces the "indigenous Aryan" idea to the writings of M. S. Golwalkar. Golwalkar (1939) denied any immigration of "Aryans" to the subcontinent, stressing that all Hindus have always been "children of the soil", a notion which according to Witzel is reminiscent of the blood and soil of contemporary fascism. Witzel adds that Savarkar offered a religious and cultural definition of Hindu-ness which he called "Hindutva". It has different components: territorial, political, nationalisitic, ancestral, cultural and religious. Since these ideas emerged on the brink of the internationalist and socially oriented Nehru-Gandhi government, they lay dormant for several decades after the independence, and only rose to prominence in the 1980s.

Bergunder likewise identifies Golwalkar as the originator of the "Indigenous Aryans" notion, and Goel's Voice of India as the instrument of its rise to notability:

The Aryan migration theory at first played no particular argumentative role in Hindu nationalism. […] This impression of indifference changed, however, with Madhav Sadashiv Golwalkar (1906–1973), who from 1940 until his death was leader of the extremist paramilitary organization the Rashtriya Swayamsevak Sangh (RSS). […] In contrast to many other of their openly offensive teachings, the Hindu nationalists did not seek to keep the question of the Aryan migration out of public discourses or to modify it; rather, efforts were made to help the theory of the indigenousness of the Hindus achieve public recognition. For this the initiative of the publisher Sita Ram Goel (b. 1921) was decisive. Goel may be considered one of the most radical, but at the same time also one of the most intellectual, of the Hindu nationalist ideologues. […] Since 1981 Goel has run a publishing house named ‘Voice of India' that is one of the few which publishes Hindu nationalist literature in English which at the same time makes a 'scientific' claim. Although no official connections exist, the books of 'Voice of India' — which are of outstanding typographical quality and are sold at a subsidized price — are widespread among the ranks of the leaders of the Sangh Parivar. […] The increasing political influence of Hindu nationalism in the 1990s resulted in attempts to revise the Aryan migration theory also becoming known to the academic public.

=== Present-day political significance ===
Lars Martin Fosse notes the political significance of "Indigenous Aryanism". He notes that "Indigenous Aryanism" has been adopted by Hindu nationalists as a part of their ideology, which makes it a political matter in addition to a scholarly problem. The proponents of Indigenous Aryanism necessarily engage in "moral disqualification" of Western Indology, which is a recurrent theme in much of the indigenist literature. The same rhetoric is being used in indigenist literature and the Hindu nationalist publications like the Organiser.

According to Abhijith Ravinutala, the indigenist position is essential for Hindutva exclusive claims on India:

The BJP considers Indo-Aryans fundamental to the party's conception of Hindutva, or "Hindu-ness": India is a nation of and for Hindus only. Only those who consider India their holy land should remain in the nation. From the BJP's point of view, the Indo-Aryan peoples were indigenous to India, and therefore were the first 'true Hindus'. Accordingly, an essential part of 'Indian' identity in this point of view is being indigenous to the land.

Repercussions of the disagreements about Aryan origins have reached Californian courts with the Californian Hindu textbook case, where according to The Times of India historian and president of the Indian History Congress, Dwijendra Narayan Jha in a "crucial affidavit" to the Superior Court of California:

...[g]iving a hint of the Aryan origin debate in India, ... asked the court not to fall for the 'indigenous Aryan' claim since it has led to 'demonisation of Muslims and Christians as foreigners and to the near denial of the contributions of non-Hindus to Indian culture'.

According to Thapar, Modi's government and the BJP have "peddled myths and stereotypes", such as the insistence on "a single uniform culture of the Aryans, ancestral to the Hindu, as having prevailed in the subcontinent, subsuming all others", despite the scholarly evidence for migrations into India, which is "anathema to the Hindutva construction of early history".

== Rejection by mainstream scholarship ==
The Indigenous Aryans theory has no relevance, let alone support, in mainstream scholarship. According to Michael Witzel, the "indigenous Aryans" position is not scholarship in the usual sense, but an "apologetic, ultimately religious undertaking":

The "revisionist project" certainly is not guided by the principles of critical theory but takes, time and again, recourse to pre-enlightenment beliefs in the authority of traditional religious texts such as the Purāṇas. In the end, it belongs, as has been pointed out earlier, to a different 'discourse' than that of historical and critical scholarship. In other words, it continues the writing of religious literature, under a contemporary, outwardly 'scientific' guise ... The revisionist and autochthonous project, then, should not be regarded as scholarly in the usual post-enlightenment sense of the word, but as an apologetic, ultimately religious undertaking aiming at proving the "truth" of traditional texts and beliefs. Worse, it is, in many cases, not even scholastic scholarship at all but a political undertaking aiming at "rewriting" history out of national pride or for the purpose of "nation building".

In her review of Bryant's The Indo-Aryan Controversy, which includes chapters by Elst and other "indigenists", Stephanie Jamison comments:

... the parallels between the Intelligent Design issue and the Indo-Aryan "controversy" are distressingly close. The Indo-Aryan controversy is a manufactured one with a non-scholarly agenda, and the tactics of its manufacturers are very close to those of the ID proponents mentioned above. However unwittingly and however high their aims, the two editors have sought to put a gloss of intellectual legitimacy, with a sense that real scientific questions are being debated, on what is essentially a religio-nationalistic attack on a scholarly consensus.

Sudeshna Guha, in her review of The Indo-Aryan Controversy, notes that the book has serious methodological shortcomings, by not asking the question what exactly constitutes historical evidence. This makes the "fair and adequate representation of the differences of opinion" problematic, since it neglects "the extent to which unscholarly opportunism has motivated the rebirth of this genre of 'scholarship'". Guha:

Bryant's call for accepting "the valid problems that are pointed out on both sides" (p. 500), holds intellectual value only if distinctions are strictly maintained between research that promotes scholarship, and that which does not. Bryant and Patton gloss over the relevance of such distinctions for sustaining the academic nature of the Indo-Aryan debate, although the importance of distinguishing the scholarly from the unscholarly is rather well enunciated through the essays of Michael Witzel and Lars Martin Fosse.

According to Bryant, OIT proponents tend to be linguistic dilettantes who either ignore the linguistic evidence completely, dismiss it as highly speculative and inconclusive, (Note: E.g. Chakrabarti 1995 and Rajaram 1995, as cited in Bryant 2001.) or attempt to tackle it with hopelessly inadequate qualifications; this attitude and neglect significantly minimises the value of most OIT publications. (Note: Witzel: "linguistic data have generally been neglected by advocates of the autochthonous theory. The only exception so far is a thin book by the Indian linguist S. S. Misra (1992) which bristles with inaccuracies and mistakes (see below) and some, though incomplete discussion by Elst (1999).")

Fosse notes crucial theoretical and methodological shortcomings in the indigenist literature. Analysing the works of Sethna, Bhagwan Singh, Navaratna and Talageri, he notes that they mostly quote English literature, which is not fully explored, and omitting German and French Indology. It makes their works in various degrees underinformed, resulting in a critique that is "largely neglected by Western scholars because it is regarded as incompetent".

According to Erdosy, the indigenist position is part of a "lunatic fringe" against the mainstream migrationist model. (Note: Erdosy: "Assertions of the indigenous origin of Indo-Aryan languages and an insistence on a long chronology for Vedic and even Epic literature are only a few of the most prominent tenets of this emerging lunatic fringe.")

== See also ==
- Dravidian culture

Indo-Aryans

- Indo-Iranians
- Indo-Aryan migrations

Politics

- Historiography and nationalism
- Saffronisation
- NCERT controversy

Indigenists

- Voice of India
  - N. S. Rajaram
  - David Frawley
- Subhash Kak

Books

- The Arctic Home in the Vedas (1903)
- In Search of the Cradle of Civilization
- Aryan Invasion of India: The Myth and the Truth (1993)
- Update on the Aryan Invasion Debate (1999)
- The Rigveda: A Historical Analysis (2000)

Other

- Yamnaya culture

== Sources ==
Printed sources

- Anthony, David W. (2007). The Horse, the Wheel and Language: How Bronze-Age Riders from the Eurasian Steppes Shaped the Modern World. Princeton University Press.
- Anthony, David W. (2019). "Ancient DNA, Mating Networks, and the Anatolian Split". Dispersals and Diversification. Leiden: Brill. pp. 21–53. doi:10.1163/9789004416192_003. ISBN 9789004416192. S2CID 213909442.
- Anthony, David (2021), Daniels, Megan (ed.), "Homo Migrans: Modeling Mobility and Migration in HUman HIstory", Migration, ancient DNA, and Bronze Age pastoralists from the Eurasian steppes, SUNY Press
- Arvidsson, Stefan (2006). Aryan Idols: Indo-European Mythology as Ideology and Science. University of Chicago Press.
- Basu (2003), "Ethnic India: A Genomic View, With Special Reference to Peopling and Structure", Genome Research, 13 (10): 2277–2290, doi:10.1101/gr.1413403, PMC 403703, PMID 14525929
- Beckwith, Christopher I. (2009). Empires of the Silk Road: A History of Central Eurasia from the Bronze Age to the Present. Princeton University Press. ISBN 978-1-4008-2994-1.
- Bergunder, Michael (2004). "Contested Past: Anti-Brahmanical and Hindu nationalist reconstructions of Indian prehistory" (PDF). Historiographia Linguistica. 31 (1): 59–104. doi:10.1075/hl.31.1.05ber.
- Blench, Roger; Spriggs, Matthew, eds. (1997). Archaeology and Language. Vol. I: Theoretical and Methodological Orientations. London: Routledge.
- Boehmer, Elleke (2010). Empire, the National, and the Postcolonial, 1890–1920: Resistance in Interaction. Oxford University Press.
- Bresnan, Patrick S. (2017), Awakening: An Introduction to the History of Eastern Thought (6th ed.), Routledge
- Bronkhorst, Johannes (2007). Greater Magadha: Studies in the Culture of Early India. BRILL.
- Bryant, Edwin F. (1996). Linguistic Substrata and the Indigenous Aryan Debate.
- Bryant, Edwin (1997). The indigenous Aryan debate (Thesis). Columbia University.
- Bryant, Edwin (2001). The Quest for the Origins of Vedic Culture: The Indo-Aryan Migration Debate. Oxford University Press. ISBN 0-19-513777-9.
- Bryant, Edwin F.; Patton, Laurie L. (2005). The Indo-Aryan Controversy: Evidence and Inference in Indian History. Routledge.
- Danino, Michel (2010). The Lost River: On the Trail of the Sarasvati. Penguin Books India.
- Darian, Steven G. (2001). "5. Ganga and Sarasvati: The Transformation of Myth". The Ganges in Myth and History. Motilal Banarsidass Publ. ISBN 978-81-208-1757-9.
- Dyson, Tim (2018). A Population History of India: From the First Modern People to the Present Day. Oxford University Press. ISBN 978-0-19-882905-8.
- Editors of Encyclopaedia Britannica [b] (n.d.). "Other sources: the process of "Sanskritization"". Encyclopædia Britannica. The history of Hinduism " Sources of Hinduism " Non-Indo-European sources " The process of "Sanskritization".
- Elst, Koenraad (1999). Update on the Aryan Invasion Debate. New Delhi: Aditya Prakashan. ISBN 81-86471-77-4. Archived from the original on 2013-08-07.
- Elst, Koenraad (2005). "Linguistic Aspects of the Aryan Non-Invasion Theory". In Bryant, Edwin; Patton, Laurie L. (eds.). The Indo-Aryan Controversy: Evidence and Inference in Indian History. Routledge.
- Erdosy, George (1995). "The prelude to Urbanization: Ethnicity and the Rise of Late Vedic Chiefdoms". In Allchin, F. R. (ed.). The Archaeology of Early Historic South Asia: The Emergence of Cities and States. Cambridge University Press.
- Erdosy (2012). The Indo-Aryans of Ancient South Asia: Language, Material Culture and Ethnicity. Walter de Gruyter. ISBN 9783110816433.
- Flood, Gavin D. (1996). An Introduction to Hinduism. Cambridge University Press.
- Flood, Gavin (2013) [1996], An Introduction to Hinduism, Cambridge University Press
- Fosse, Lars Martin (2005). "Aryan Past and Post-colonial Present: The Polemics and Politics of Indigenous Aryanism". In Bryant, Edwin; Patton, Laurie L. (eds.). The Indo-Aryan Controversy: Evidence and Inference in Indian History. Routledge.
- Friese, Kai (2019). "The Complications of Genetics". In R. Thapar; M. Witzel; J. Menon; K. Friese; R. Khan (eds.). Which of Us Are Aryans?. ALEPH.
- Fritze, Ronald H. (2009). Invented Knowledge: False History, Fake Science and Pseudo-religions. London: Reaktion Books.
- Giosan; et al. (2012). "Fluvial landscapes of the Harappan civilization". PNAS. 109 (26) E1688–E1694. Bibcode:2012PNAS..109E1688G. doi:10.1073/pnas.1112743109. PMC 3387054. PMID 22645375.
- Guha, Sudeshna (2007). "Reviewed Work: The Indo-Aryan Controversy: Evidence and Inference in Indian History by Edwin F. Bryant, Laurie Patton". Journal of the Royal Asiatic Society. Third Series. 17 (3): 340–343. doi:10.1017/S135618630700733X. S2CID 163092658.
- Hancock, Graham (2002). Underworld: Flooded Kingdoms of the Ice Age. Penguin Books. ISBN 0-7181-4400-7.
- Hansen, Thomas Blom (1999). The Saffron Wave: Democracy and Hindu Nationalism in Modern India. Princeton University Press. ISBN 978-1-4008-2305-5.
- Heehs, Peter (2008). The Lives of Sri Aurobindo. New York: Columbia University Press. ISBN 978-0-231-14098-0.
- Hewson, John (1997). Tense and Aspect in Indo-European Languages. John Benjamins Publishing.
- Hickey, Raymond (2010). "Contact and Language Shift". In Hickey, Raymond (ed.). The Handbook of Language Contact. John Wiley & Sons.
- Jaffrelot, Christophe (1996). The Hindu Nationalist Movement and Indian Politics. C. Hurst & Co. Publishers. ISBN 978-1-85065-301-1.
- Jamison, Stephanie W. (2006). "The Indo-Aryan Controversy: Evidence and Inference in Indian History (Book Review)" (PDF). Journal of Indo-European Studies. 34: 255–261.
- Jha, D. N. (1998). "Against Communalising History". Social Scientist. 26 (9/10): 52–62. doi:10.2307/3517941. JSTOR 3517941.
- Kak, Subhash (1987). "On the Chronology of Ancient India" (PDF). Indian Journal of History of Science (22): 222–234. Archived from the original (PDF) on 2015-01-22.
- Kak, Subhash (1996). "Knowledge of Planets in the Third Millennium BC" (PDF). Quarterly Journal of the Royal Astronomical Society. 37: 709–715. Bibcode:1996QJRAS..37..709K.
- Kak, Subhash (2001). The Wishing Tree: Presence and Promise of India. Munshiram Manoharlal Publishers. ISBN 0-595-49094-8.
- Kak, Subhash (2001b), "On the Chronological Framework for Indian Culture" (PDF), Journal of Indian Council of Philosophical Research
- Kak, Subhash (2015). "The Mahabharata and the Sindhu-Sarasvati Tradition" (PDF). Sanskrit Magazine.
- Kazanas, Nicholas (2001). "A new date for the Rgveda" (PDF). Journal of Indian Council of Philosophical Research (special issue).
- Kazanas, N. (2002). "Indigenous Indo-Aryans and the Rigveda" (PDF). Journal of Indo-European Studies. 30: 275–334.
- Kazanas, N. (2003). "Final Reply" (PDF). Journal of Indo-European Studies. 31: 187–240. Archived from the original (PDF) on 16 August 2009.
- Kennedy, Kenneth A. R. (2000). God-apes and Fossil Men: Paleoanthropology of South Asia. University of Michigan Press. ISBN 9780472110131.
- Kennedy, Kenneth A.R. (2012), "Have Aryans been identified in the prehistorical skeletal record from South Asia? Biological anthropology and concepts of ancient races", in Erdosy, George (ed.), The Indo-Aryans of Ancient South Asia: Language, Material Culture and Ethnicity, Walter de Gruyter
- Khan, Razib (2019), "Genetic origins of Indo-Aryans", in R. Thapar; M. Witzel; J. Menon; K. Friese; R. Khan (eds.), Which of Us Are Aryans?, ALEPH
- Kreisburg, Glenn (2012). Mysteries of the Ancient Past: A Graham Hancock Reader. Bear and Company. ISBN 978-1-59143-155-8.
- Kumar, Senthil (2012). Read Indussian: The Archaic Tamil from c. 7000 BCE. Amarabharathi Publications & Booksellers.
- Kurien, Prema A (2007). A place at the multicultural table the development of an American Hinduism. Rutgers University Press. p. 255. ISBN 9780813540559. OCLC 703221465.
- Kuz'mina, Elena Efimovna (1994). Откуда пришли индоарии? [Whence came the Indo-Aryans?] (in Russian). Moscow: Российская академия наук (Russian Academy of Sciences).
- Kuz'mina, Elena Efimovna (2007). Mallory, James Patrick (ed.). The Origin of the Indo-Iranians. Leiden Indo-European Etymological Dictionary Series. Leiden: Brill.
- Lal, B. B. (1984). Frontiers of the Indus Civilization.
- Lal, B.B. (1998). New Light on the Indus Civilization. Delhi: Aryan Books.
- Lazaridis, Iosif (2016), "Genomic insights into the origin of farming in the ancient Near East", Nature, 536 (7617): 419–424, Bibcode:2016Natur.536..419L, doi:10.1038/nature19310, PMC 5003663, PMID 27459054
- Lowe, John J. (2015). Participles in Rigvedic Sanskrit: The syntax and semantics of adjectival verb forms. Oxford University Press. ISBN 978-0-19-100505-3.
- Mallory, J. P. (1989). In Search of the Indo-Europeans: Language, Archaeology, and Myth. London: Thames & Hudson. ISBN 0-500-27616-1..
- Mallory, J. P. (1998). "A European Perspective on Indo-Europeans in Asia". In Mair (ed.). The Bronze Age and Early Iron Age Peoples of Eastern Central Asia. Washington DC: Institute for the Study of Man. ISBN 0-941694-63-1.
- Mallory, J. P. (2002). "Editor's Note". Journal of Indo-European Studies. 30: 274.
- Mallory, J.P. (2002b), "Archaeological models and Asian Indo-Europeans", in Sims-Williams, Nicholas (ed.), Indi-Iranian Languages and Peoples, Oxford University Press
- Mallory, J. P; Adams, D.Q. (2006). The Oxford Introduction to Proto-Indo-European and the Proto-Indo-European World. Oxford University Press.
- Mallory, J.P. (2013), "Twenty-first century clouds over Indo-European homelands" (PDF), Journal of Language Relationship, 9: 145–154, doi:10.31826/jlr-2013-090113, S2CID 212689004
- McGetchin, Douglas T. (2015), "'Orient' and 'Occident', 'East' and 'West' in the Doscourse of German Orientalists, 1790–1930", in Bavaj, Riccardo; Steber, Martina (eds.), Germany and 'The West': The History of a Modern Concept, Berghahn Books
- Metspalu, Mait; Gallego Romero, Irene; Yunusbayev, Bayazit; Chaubey, Gyaneshwer; Mallick, Chandana Basu; Hudjashov, Georgi; Nelis, Mari; Mägi, Reedik; Metspalu, Ene; Remm, Maido; Pitchappan, Ramasamy; Singh, Lalji; Thangaraj, Kumarasamy; Villems, Richard; Kivisild, Toomas (2011), "Shared and Unique Components of Human Population Structure and Genome-Wide Signals of Positive Selection in South Asia", The American Journal of Human Genetics, 89 (6): 731–744, doi:10.1016/j.ajhg.2011.11.010, ISSN 0002-9297, PMC 3234374, PMID 22152676
- Narasimhan VM, Patterson N, Moorjani P, Rohland N, Bernardos R, Mallick S, et al. (September 2019). "The formation of human populations in South and Central Asia". Science. 365 (6457) eaat7487. Bibcode:2019Sci...365t7487N. doi:10.1126/science.aat7487. PMC 6822619. PMID 31488661.
- Parpola, Asko (2015). The Roots of Hinduism: The Early Aryans and the Indus Civilisation. Oxford University Press.
- Parpola, Asko (2020). "Royal "Chariot" Burials of Sanauli near Delhi and Archaeological Correlates of Prehistoric Indo-Iranian Languages". Studia Orientalia Electronica. 8: 175–198. doi:10.23993/store.98032.
- Pereltsvaig, Asya; Lewis, Martin W. (2015), The Indo-European Controversy, Cambridge University Press
- Pinkney, Andrea Marion (2014), "Revealing the Vedas in 'Hinduism': Foundations and issues of interpretation of religions in South Asian Hindu traditions", in Turner, Bryan S.; Salemink, Oscar (eds.), Routledge Handbook of Religions in Asia, Routledge, ISBN 978-1-317-63646-5
- Possehl, Gregory L. (2002). The Indus Civilization: A Contemporary Perspective. Rowman Altamira. ISBN 978-0-7591-0172-2.
- Ravinutala, Abhijith (2013). Politicizing the Past: Depictions of Indo-Aryans in Indian Textbooks from 1998–2007.
- Reddy, Krishna (2006), Indian History, Tata McGraw-Hill Education
- Rao, S. R. (1993). The Aryans in Indus Civilization.
- Reich, David (2018), Who We Are and How We Got Here: Ancient DNA and the New Science of the Human Past, Knopf Doubleday Publishing Group
- Rocher, Ludo (1986), The Purāṇas, Otto Harrassowitz Verlag
- Salmons, Joseph (2015), "Language shift and the Indo-Europanization of Europe", in Mailhammer, Robert; Vennemann, Theo; Olsen, Birgit Anette (eds.), Origin and Development of European Languages, Museum Tusculanum Press
- Schlegel, Friedrich von (1808). Ueber die Sprache und Weisheit der Indier.
- Senthil Kumar, A.S. (2012), Read Indussian, Amarabharathi Publications & Booksellers
- Shaffer, Jim (2013) [1st Pub. 1984]. "The Indo-Aryan Invasions: Cultural Myth and Archaeological Reality". In Lukacs, J. R. (ed.). In The Peoples of South Asia. New York: Plenum Press. pp. 74–90.
- Shaffer, J.; Lichtenstein, D. (1999). "Migration, Philology and South Asian Archaeology". In Bronkhorst, J.; Deshpande, M. (eds.). In Aryan and Non-Aryan in South Asia: Evidence, Interpretation and Ideology. Harvard University Press.
- Shinde, Vasant; Narasimhan, Vagheesh M.; Rohland, Nadin; Mallick, Swapan; et al. (2019), "An Ancient Harappan Genome Lacks Ancestry from Steppe Pastoralists or Iranian Farmers", Cell, 179 (3): 729–735.e10, doi:10.1016/j.cell.2019.08.048, PMC 6800651, PMID 31495572
- Silva, Marina (2017), "A genetic chronology for the Indian Subcontinent points to heavily sex-biased dispersals", BMC Evolutionary Biology, 17 (1) 88, Bibcode:2017BMCEE..17...88S, doi:10.1186/s12862-017-0936-9, PMC 5364613, PMID 28335724
- Singh, Upinder (2008). A History of Ancient and Early Medieval India: From the Stone Age to the 12th Century. Pearson Education India. ISBN 978-81-317-1677-9.
- Singh, Upinder (2009), History of Ancient and Early Medieval India: From the Stone Age to the 12th Century, Longman, ISBN 978-8131716779
- Talageri, Shrikant G. (2000). The Rigveda: A Historical Analysis. New Delhi: Aditya Prakashan. ISBN 81-7742-010-0. Archived from the original on 2007-09-30.
- Thapar, Romila (1996). "The Theory of Aryan Race and India: History and Politics". Social Scientist. 24 (1/3): 3–29. doi:10.2307/3520116. JSTOR 3520116.
- Thapar, Romila (2006). India: Historical Beginnings and the Concept of the Aryan. National Book Trust. ISBN 9788123747798.
- Thomason, Sarah Grey; Kaufman, Terrence (1988). Language Contact, Creolization, and Genetic Linguistics. University of California Press. ISBN 0-520-07893-4.
- Trautmann, Thomas (2005). The Aryan Debate. Oxford University Press.
- Trautmann, Thomas R. (1997). Aryans and British India. University of California Press. ISBN 978-0-520-91792-7.
- Truschke, Audrey (15 December 2020). "Hindutva's Dangerous Rewriting of History". South Asia Multidisciplinary Academic Journal (24/25). doi:10.4000/samaj.6636. ISSN 1960-6060.
- Turner, Bryan S. (2020), "Sanskritization", International Encyclopedia of the Social Sciences
- Underhill, Peter A.; et al. (2010). "Separating the post-Glacial coancestry of European and Asian y chromosomes within haplogroup R1a". European Journal of Human Genetics. 18 (4): 479–484. doi:10.1038/ejhg.2009.194. PMC 2987245. PMID 19888303. S2CID 25892061.
- Valdiya, K. S. (2013). "The River Saraswati was a Himalayan-born River" (PDF). Current Science. 104 (1): 42.
- Varma, V. P. (1990). The Political Philosophy of Sri Aurobindo. Motilal Banarsidass Publ.
- Walsh, Judith E. (2011). A Brief History of India. Facts on File. ISBN 978-0-8160-8143-1.
- Warder, A. K. (2000). Indian Buddhism. Delhi: Motilal Banarsidass.
- Witzel, Michael E. J. (1984). "Sur le chemin du ciel" (PDF).
- Witzel, Michael E. J. (1995), "Early Sanskritization: Origin and Development of the Kuru state" (PDF), Electronic Journal of Vedic Studies, 1 (4): 1–26, archived from the original (PDF) on 11 June 2007
- Witzel, Michael E. J. (1999). "Substrate Languages in Old Indo-Aryan (Ṛgvedic, Middle and Late Vedic)" (PDF). Electronic Journal of Vedic Studies. 5 (1). Archived from the original (PDF) on 2012-02-06..
- Witzel, Michael E. J. (17 February 2000). Kenoyer, J. (ed.). "The Languages of Harappa" (PDF). Proceedings of the Conference on the Indus Civilization. Madison..
- Witzel, Michael E. J. (2001). "Autochthonous Aryans? The Evidence from Old Indian and Iranian Texts" (PDF). Electronic Journal of Vedic Studies. 7 (3): 1–115.
- Witzel, Michael E. J. (2003). "Ein Fremdling im Rgveda". Journal of Indo-European Studies (in German). 31 (1–2): 107–185..
- Witzel, Michael E. J. (2005). "Indocentrism". In Bryant, Edwin; Patton, Laurie L. (eds.). The Indo-Aryan Controversy: Evidence and Inference in Indian History. Routledge.
- Witzel, Michael E. J. (2006). "Rama's realm: Indocentric rewritings of early South Asian History". In Fagan, Garrett (ed.). Archaeological Fantasies: How Pseudoarchaeology Misrepresents the Past and Misleads the Public. Routledge. ISBN 0-415-30592-6.
- Witzel, Michael (2006b). "Early Loan Words in Western Central Asia: Indicators of Substrate Populations, Migrations, and Trade Relations". In Mair, Victor H. (ed.). Contact And Exchange in the Ancient World. University of Hawaii Press. ISBN 978-0-8248-2884-4.
- Witzel, Michael E. J. (2012). The Origins of the World's Mythologies. Oxford University Press.
- Witzel, Michael (2019), "Early ' Aryans' and their neighbors outside and inside India", Journal of Biosciences, 44 (3) 58, doi:10.1007/s12038-019-9881-7, PMID 31389347, S2CID 195804491
- Haak, Wolfgang; Lazaridis, Iosif; Patterson, Nick; Rohland, Nadin; Mallick, Swapan; Llamas, Bastien; Brandt, Guido; Nordenfelt, Susanne; Harney, Eadaoin; Stewardson, Kristin; Fu, Qiaomei; Mittnik, Alissa; Bánffy, Eszter; Economou, Christos; Francken, Michael; Friederich, Susanne; Pena, Rafael Garrido; Hallgren, Fredrik; Khartanovich, Valery; Khokhlov, Aleksandr; Kunst, Michael; Kuznetsov, Pavel; Meller, Harald; Mochalov, Oleg; Moiseyev, Vayacheslav; Nicklisch, Nicole; Pichler, Sandra L.; Risch, Roberto; Rojo Guerra, Manuel A.; Roth, Christina; Szécsényi-Nagy, Anna; Wahl, Joachim; Meyer, Matthias; Krause, Johannes; Brown, Dorcas; Anthony, David; Cooper, Alan; Alt, Kurt Werner; Reich, David (2015). "Massive migration from the steppe was a source for Indo-European languages in Europe". Nature. 522 (7555): 207–211. arXiv:1502.02783. Bibcode:2015Natur.522..207H. doi:10.1038/nature14317. ISSN 0028-0836. PMC 5048219. PMID 25731166.
- Olalde, Iñigo; et al. (2018). "The Beaker phenomenon and the genomic transformation of northwest Europe". Nature. 555 (7695): 190–196. Bibcode:2018Natur.555..190O. doi:10.1038/nature25738. ISSN 0028-0836. PMC 5973796. PMID 29466337.
- Saag, Lehti; Varul, Liivi; Scheib, Christiana Lyn; Stenderup, Jesper; Allentoft, Morten E.; Saag, Lauri; Pagani, Luca; Reidla, Maere; Tambets, Kristiina; Metspalu, Ene; Kriiska, Aivar; Willerslev, Eske; Kivisild, Toomas; Metspalu, Mait (2017). "Extensive Farming in Estonia Started through a Sex-Biased Migration from the Steppe". Current Biology. 27 (14): 2185–2193.e6. Bibcode:2017CBio...27E2185S. doi:10.1016/j.cub.2017.06.022. ISSN 0960-9822. PMID 28712569.

Web-sources
