= Biblia Impex India =

Biblia Impex India is a New Delhi–based book distribution company that specializes in books on Indology, Hinduism and Buddhism founded by the influential Indian historian Sita Ram Goel in 1963. It is currently managed by Goel's son Pradeep Kumar Goel.

In addition to its own publications, Biblia Impex acts as a distributor for Aditya Prakashan, Adyar Library and Research Centre, the Bhandarkar Oriental Research Institute, the Central University of Tibetan Studies, Sampurnanand Sanskrit University and the Samvad India Foundation.

Aditya Prakashan publishes many works on Indian culture and art, Hindu and Buddhist literature and philosophy and is notable, in particular, for works related to Hindu reform movements, including works by K. D. Sethna, Hindu nationalism, including works by Dharampal and K.R. Malkani, and literature on the controversial "Out of India" theory. Historian Irfan Habib characterises it as the publishing house of the Sangh Parivar, the RSS family of Hindu nationalist organisations.

Sita Ram Goel also owned the Voice of India publishing house which specializes in more extreme Hindu nationalist topics. Following Goel's death, Voice of India came under the management of Aditya Prakashan.

== See also ==
- Ram Swarup
- K.S. Lal
- Koenraad Elst
- David Frawley
