= Subhash Kak =

Indian American computer scientist

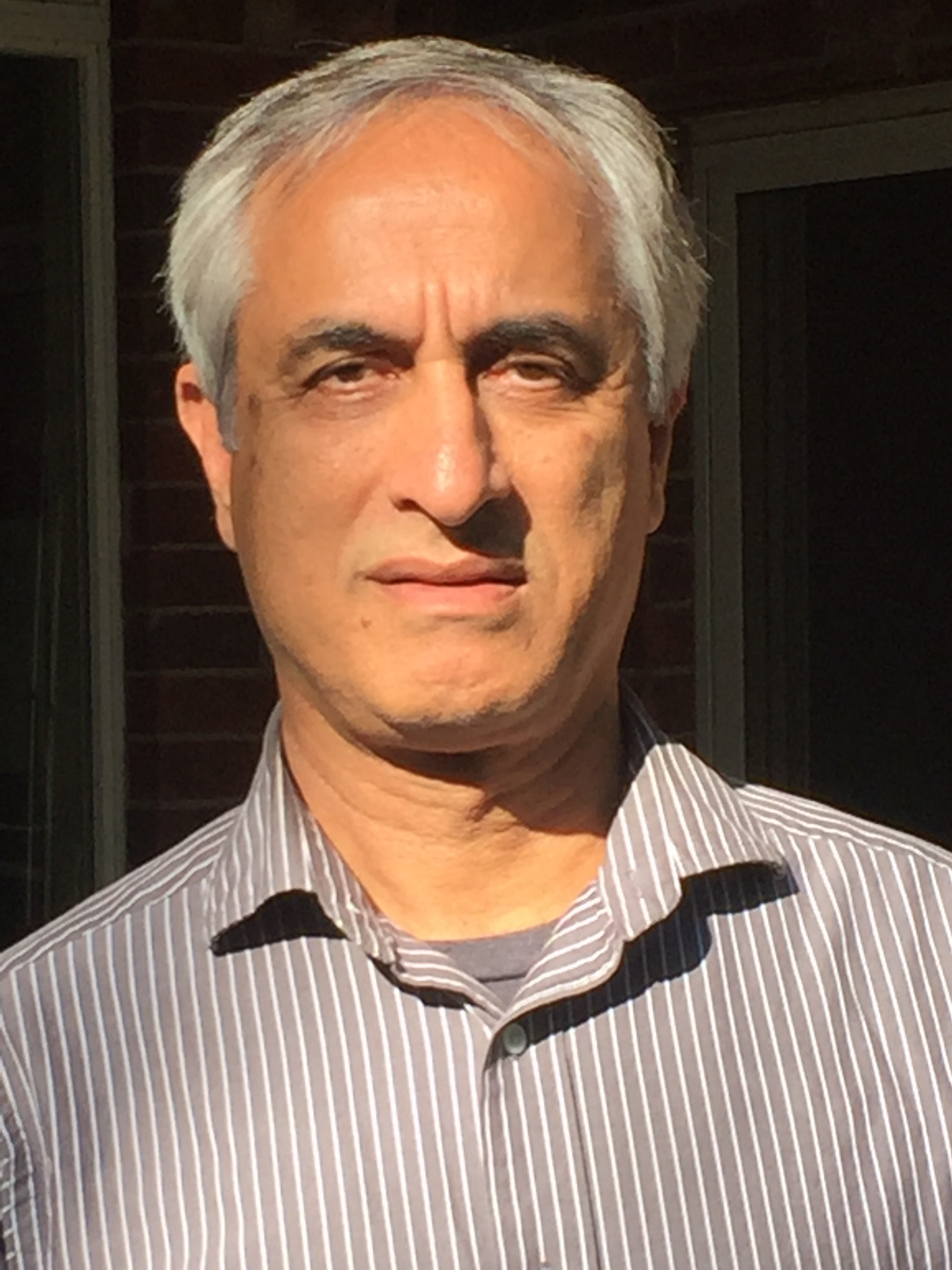
- Kak at Foundations of Quantum Mechanics Conference, Växjö, Sweden in 2016
- Born: Srinagar, Jammu and Kashmir, British India

Academic background
- Education: NIT Srinagar, IIT Delhi

Academic work
- Discipline: Computer Science
- Sub-discipline: Cryptography; Quantum cryptography; Quantum information; History of science
- Institutions: Oklahoma State University–Stillwater
- Notable works: In Search of the Cradle of Civilization
- Notable ideas: Instantaneously trained neural networks

Subhash Kak is an Indian-American computer scientist and Hindutva historical revisionist. He is the Regents Professor of the School of Electrical & Computer Engineering at Oklahoma State University–Stillwater, an honorary visiting professor of engineering at Jawaharlal Nehru University, and a member of the Indian Prime Minister's Science, Technology and Innovation Advisory Council (PM-STIAC).

Kak has published on the history of science, the philosophy of science, ancient astronomy, and the history of mathematics. Kak has also published on archaeoastronomy, and advocated the idea of Indigenous Aryans. Many scholars have rejected his theories on these topics in entirety, and his writings have been heavily criticized.

In 2019, the Government of India awarded him the Padma Shri, the fourth highest civilian award in India.

== Early life and education ==
Kak was born to Ram Nath Kak, a government veterinary doctor and Sarojini Kak in Srinagar, India. His brother is the computer scientist Avinash Kak and his sister is the literary theorist Jaishree Odin.

Kak received a Bachelor of Engineering degree from the Regional Engineering College, Srinagar (now the National Institute of Technology, Srinagar) and a Ph.D. from the Indian Institute of Technology Delhi in 1970.

== Academic career ==
During 1975–1976, Kak was a visiting faculty at Imperial College, London, and a guest researcher at Bell Laboratories, Murray Hill. In 1977, he was a visiting researcher at the Tata Institute of Fundamental Research, Bombay. In 1979, he joined Louisiana State University, Baton Rouge, where he was appointed the Donald C. and Elaine T. Delaune Distinguished Professor of Electrical and Computer Engineering. In 2007, he joined the Computer Science department at Oklahoma State University–Stillwater.

Kak proposed an efficient three-layer feed-forward neural network architecture and developed four corner classification algorithms for training it. Despite being criticized for scalability issues; it gained the attention of the electronic hardware community. Kak has argued that there are limits to artificial intelligence and that it cannot match biological intelligence. Kak has been critical of the generalization of the quantum computing to commercial scale; he argues error correction is a significant challenge for scalability although it's fundamental to multi-purpose computing.

Kak is the Regents Professor of the School of Electrical & Computer Engineering at Oklahoma State University–Stillwater, and an honorary visiting professor of engineering at Jawaharlal Nehru University. He is also an honorary visiting professor of media studies at Jawaharlal Nehru University.

On 28 August 2018, he was appointed member of the Prime Minister's Science, Technology and Innovation Advisory Council (PM-STIAC) in India.

== Indology ==
=== Indigenous Aryanism ===
Kak primarily advocates for an autochthonous origin of the Indo-Aryans from Punjab ("Indigenous Aryans" hypothesis) in contradiction of the scholarly consensus about the validity of Indo-Aryan migration theory; Kak reads the promotion of the latter theory to stem from racist tendencies. Scholars have noted his charges to be without any basis, lacking in any critical examination and primarily intended to promote Hindu supremacy.

=== Ancient astronomy in the Rig Veda ===
Kak has also claimed to find evidences of advanced computing and astronomy in the Rig Veda, in what Noretta Koertge deems to be a "social constructivist and postmodern attack on modern science". He insists that Vedic scientists discovered the physical laws by Yogic meditation and that it is a valid scientific method which can be only evaluated within the paradigm of Vedic assumptions and by those who have attained Yogic enlightenment. According to Meera Nanda, Kak believes in the superiority of Hindus over Muslims. In a 2004 critique, she summarized some of Kak's views on the matter: according to Kak, Hindus built "cultural empires" without military conquest, in contrast to Muslim "military empires" reliant on conquest.

=== Reviewed works ===
==== Archaeoastronomy – The Astronomical Code of the Rigveda ====
In the book, Kak proposes that the organization of hymns in the Rig Veda was dictated by an astronomic code concerning the courses of planets—length of solar year and lunar year, the distance between sun and earth et cetera. He then leverages the proposition to argue for the existence of a tradition of sophisticated observational astronomy as far back as 3000 or 4000 BCE. Kak also states that the construction of fire-altars were a coded representation of their astronomic knowledge and that the Vedic civilisation were aware of the speed of light. He prepared the section on archaeoastronomical sites in India for the thematic study on Heritage Sites of Astronomy and Archaeoastronomy in the context of the UNESCO World Heritage Convention prepared for UNESCO by the International Council on Monuments and Sites (ICOMOS) and the International Astronomical Union (IAU).

While Kak's interpretation has been included in recent overviews of astronomy in the Vedic period in India and the West, his chronology and astronomical calculations have been critiqued by several Indologists, such as Michael Witzel, and the noted historian of mathematics Kim Plofker.

Kim Plofker rejected Kak's probabilistic analysis of the presence of planetary period numbers in the Rigveda's hymn number combinations, showing that Kak's apparent matches have "no statistical significance whatever". Witzel has rejected his analysis to be suffering from several shortcomings and questioned his usage of arbitrary multiplication factors to lead to the results. Kak's method depends on the structure of the Rigveda as redacted by the shakhas in the late Brahmana period, well within the Indian Iron Age, when it was organized into mandalas ("books"). According to Witzel, this leaves Kak's approach attempt to date the text flawed, because this process of redaction took place long after the composition of the individual hymns during the samhita prose period. Witzel concludes that the entire issue boiled down to an over-interpretation of some facts that were internally inconsistent and more, to the creativeness of Kak who was pre-motivated to find evidence of astronomy at every verse of Rig Veda. Meera Nanda criticized the arbitrary and absurd nature of Kak's analysis at length and noted his method to be "breathtakingly ad hoc" which "reads like numerology." M A Mehendale, in a review over Annals of the Bhandarkar Oriental Research Institute, criticized the book for its many shortcomings which did not stand the scrutiny of rigor and remarked it to contain inaccurate and misleading statements. S. G. Dani, a Shanti Swarup Bhatnagar prize recipient rejected Kak's hypothesis as unscientific and highly speculative with extremely vague details and whose results were statistically insignificant.

Klaus Klostermaier in his book A Survey of Hinduism praised Kak, for opening up an "entirely new approach to the study of Vedic cosmology from an empirical astronomical/mathematical viewpoint". Klostermaier's books have been heavily criticized for offering pro-Hindu views that have little currency in scholarship.

Kak's work influenced Raja Ram Mohan Roy's 1999 book Vedic Physics: Scientific Origin of Hinduism, which sought to prove that the RigVeda was coded per the laws of quantum and particle physics. Kak wrote the foreword to this book commending Roy's interpretations as a new way of looking at Vedic Physics. Meera Nanda, one of Kak's foremost critics, noted the result to be a "shameful demeaning of physics as well as the Vedas" and resembling "ravings of mad men".

==== In Search of the Cradle of Civilization ====
Kak co-authored In Search of the Cradle of Civilization with Georg Feuerstein and David Frawley, equating the Vedic Aryans with the Harappans and thus, participating in the political controversy around the "Indigenous Aryans" theory. The chronology espoused in this book is based on the archaeoastronomical readings obtained by correlating textual references and archaeological remains.

A review by Indian archaeologist M. K. Dhavalikar over Annals of the Bhandarkar Oriental Research Institute noted it to be a "beautifully printed" contribution that made a strong case for their indigenous theory against the supposed migratory hypotheses, but chose to remain silent on certain crucial aspects which need to be convincingly explained. Guy Beck showered glowing praises on the book in his review over the Yoga Journal. Klostermaier et al. praised the book. Prema Kurien noted that the book sought to distinguish expatriate Hindu Americans from other minority groups by demonstrating their superior racial and cultural ties with the Europeans.

=== Reception ===
Edwin Bryant calls him a well read and articulate spokesman for the Indigenous Aryan hypothesis and for other issues concerning ancient Indian science and culture.

Scholars have rejected his theories in entirety and his writings have been heavily criticized. Acute misrepresentation of facts coupled with wrong observations, extremely flexible and often self-contradictory analysis, cherry picking of data and forwarding of easily disprovable hypotheses have been located. His understanding of linguistics and subsequent assertion have been challenged. Romila Thapar calls Kak an amateur historian whose views on the Indus Civilization were fringe and who was part of a group that had more to do with waging political battles at the excuse of history. Michael Witzel noted him to be a revisionist and part of a "closely knit, self-adulatory group", members of which often write together and/or profusely copy from and cite one another, thus rendering the whole scene into a virtually indistinguishable hotchpotch. Garrett G. Fagan, a noted critic of pseudoarchaeology has concurred with Witzel. Meera Nanda writes about Kak being revered as a stalwart of Hindutva and one of the leading "intellectual Kshatriyas". Similar concerns of his being a Hindutva-based revisionist have been echoed by other writers. In a critique of faulty scientific reasoning in Hindutva ideologies and theories, Alan Sokal sarcastically criticized Kak as "one of the leading intellectual luminaries of the Hindu-nationalist diaspora". Koertge as well as Meera Nanda have remarked that Kak's work advances a Hindutva-based esoteric pseudoscience narrative that seeks to find relatively advanced abstract physics in Vedic texts and assign Indian indigenousness to the Sanskrit-speaking Indic Aryans in a bid to prove the superiority of the ancient Hindu civilization.

== See also ==
- Archaeoastronomy and Vedic chronology
- Number theoretic Hilbert transform
- Science wars
- Unary coding

== Sources ==
- Witzel, Michael (2001), "Autochthonous Aryans? The Evidence from Old Indian and Iranian Texts" (PDF), Electronic Journal of Vedic Studies, 7 (3), 70–71, archived from the original (PDF) on 23 May 2013
- Kurien, Prema A (2007). A place at the multicultural table the development of an American Hinduism. Rutgers University Press. p. 255. ISBN 9780813540559. OCLC 703221465.
