= David Frawley =

American Hindu teacher

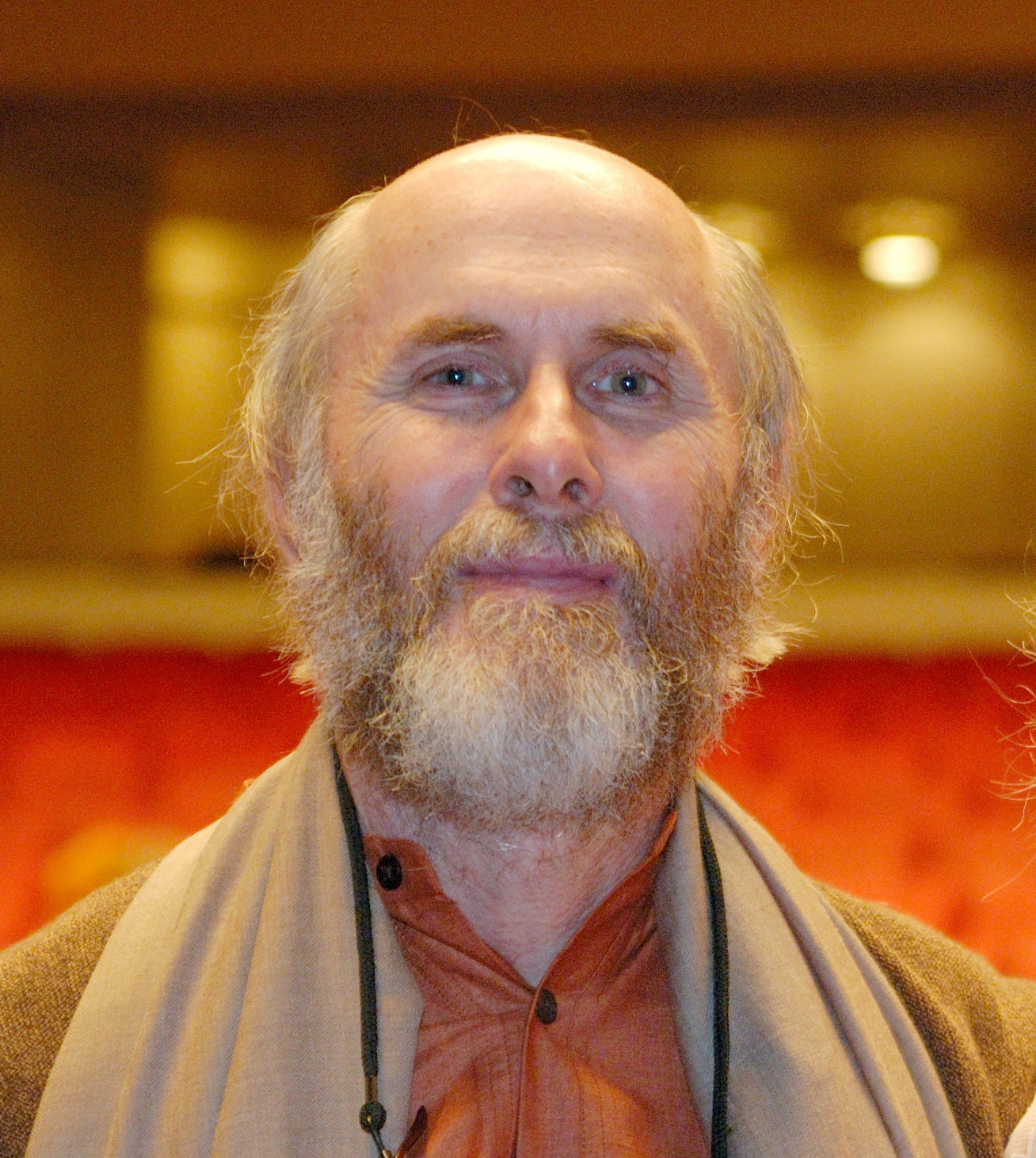
- Frawley in 2007
- Born: September 21, 1950 (age 76); Wisconsin, United States
- Other name: Vamadeva Shastri
- Occupations: Writer, ayurvedic practitioner, Hindu astrologer
- Spouse: Shambhavi Chopra
- Awards: Padma Bhushan (2015)
- Website: American Institute of Vedic Studies

David Frawley (born September 21, 1950) is an American Hindutva activist and a teacher of Hinduism.

He has written numerous books on topics spanning the Vedas, Hinduism, yoga, ayurveda and Hindu astrology. In 2015 he was honored by the government of India with the Padma Bhushan, the third-highest civilian award in India.

A prominent ideologue of the Hindutva movement, he has been accused of practicing historical revisionism.

== Early life and education ==
David Frawley was born to a Catholic family in Wisconsin and had nine siblings. Frawley is largely an autodidact. He studied ayurveda under B. L. Vashta of Mumbai for a span of about a decade, and obtained a "Doctor of Oriental Medicine" degree via a correspondence course from the International Institute of Chinese Medicine, Santa Fe, New Mexico, a school for acupuncture which closed in 2003 due to "administrative and governance irregularities" and financial problems."

Frawley is the founder and the sole instructor at the American Institute of Vedic Studies at Santa Fe, New Mexico and is a former president of the American Council of Vedic Astrology. He also previously taught Chinese herbal medicine and western herbology.

== Views and reception ==
=== Views ===
Frawley rejects the Indo-Aryan migration theory in favor of the Indigenous Aryans theory, accusing his opponents of having a “European missionary bias”. In the book In Search of the Cradle of Civilization (1995), Frawley along with Georg Feuerstein and Subhash Kak has rejected the widely supported Indo-Aryan migration, rhetorically calling it the Aryan Invasion Theory, an outdated and inaccurate term, and supported the Indigenous Aryans theory. Frawley also criticizes the 19th-century racial interpretations of Indian prehistory, and went on to reject the theory of a conflict between invading caucasoid Aryans and Dravidians.

In the sphere of market-economics, Frawley opposes socialism, stating that such policies have reduced citizens to beggars. He is a practitioner of Ayurveda, and recommends the practice of ascetic rituals along with moral purification as indispensable parts of the Advaita tradition.

=== Reception ===
==== Popular reception ====
While being rejected by academia, he has been successful in the popular market; according to Bryant, his works are clearly directed and articulated at such audiences. He's been a prominent voice in the introduction of Ayurvedic medicine and Vedic astrology among a western, nonmedical trained audience. According to Edwin Bryant, he is "well-received" by "the Indian community," noting that a Westerner rejecting the Aryan Migration Theory has an obvious appeal in India and Frawley (along with Koenraad Elst) fits in it, perfectly. Frawley commands a significant following on Twitter, as well.

==== Academia ====
===== Hindutva =====
He has been described as a prominent figure of the Hindutva movement and numerous scholars have also described him as a Hindutva ideologue and apologist. He has been widely described as practicing historical revisionism. Martha Nussbaum and others consider him to be the most determined opponent to the theory of Indo-Aryan migrations.

Meera Nanda asserts Frawley to be a member of the Hindu far right, who decries Islam and Christianity as religions for the lower intellects and whose works feature a Hindu Supremacist spin. Sudeshna Guha of Cambridge University notes him to be a sectarian non-scholar and as a proponent of a broader scheme for establishing a nationalist history. Irfan Habib rejected considering Frawley as a scholar, and instead, noted him to be a Hindutva pamphleteer, who "telescoped the past to serve the present" and was not minimally suitable of being defined as a scholar, of any kind. Bryant notes him to be an unambiguously pro-Hindu scholar. Peter Heehs deems of him to be part of a group of reactionary orientalists, who professed an avid dislike for the Oriental-Marxist school of historiography and hence, chose to rewrite the history of India but without any training in relevant disciplines; he also accused Frawley of misappropriating Aurobindo's nuanced stance on the Indigenous Aryans hypothesis.

Bruce Lincoln attributes Frawley's ideas to "parochial nationalism", terming them "exercises in scholarship (= myth + footnotes)", where archaeological data spanning several millennia is selectively invoked, with no textual sources to control the inquiry, in support of the theorists' desired narrative. His proposed equivalence of Ayurveda with vedic healing traditions has been rejected by Indologists and David Hardiman considers Frawley's assertion to be part of a wider Hindu-nationalist quest. Joseph Alter notes that his writings 'play into the politics of nationalism' and remarks of them to be controversial from an academic locus.

===== Book reviews =====
In a review of Hymns from the Golden Age: Selected Hymns from the Rig Veda with Yogic Interpretation for the Journal of the American Oriental Society, Richard G. Salomon criticized Frawley's "fanciful" approach to stand in complete contrast to the available linguistic and scholarly evidence, and perpetuated Vedic myths in what seemed to be a bid to attract readers for the recreation of the ancient spiritual kingdom of the Aryans.

A review by M. K. Dhavalikar in Annals of the Bhandarkar Oriental Research Institute called In Search of the Cradle of Civilization a "beautifully printed" contribution that made a strong case for their indigenous theory against the supposed migratory hypotheses but chose to remain silent on certain crucial aspects which need to be convincingly explained. Prema Kurien noted that the book sought to distinguish expatriate Hindu Americans from other minority groups by demonstrating their superior racial and cultural ties with the Europeans.

Dhavalikar also reviewed The Myth of the Aryan Invasion of India and found it to be unsupported by archaeological evidence. Irfan Habib criticized Frawley's invoking the Sarasvati River in the book as an assault against common sense.

== Honors and influences ==
In 2015, the South Indian Education Society (SIES) in Mumbai, India, an affiliate of Kanchi Kamakoti Peetham, conferred upon him their special "National Eminence Award" as an “international expert in the fields of Ayurveda, Yoga, and Vedic Astrology.” On 26 January 2015, the Indian Government honored Frawley with the Padma Bhushan award.

Referring to his book Yoga and Ayurveda, Frawley is mentioned as one of the main yoga teachers of Deepak Chopra and David Simon in their book, the Seven Spiritual Laws of Yoga (2005). In 2015, Chopra said of Frawley's book, Shiva, the Lord of Yoga, "Vamadeva Shastri has been a spiritual guide and mentor of mine for several decades. For anyone who is serious about the journey to higher divine consciousness, this book is yet another jewel from him."

== Selected publications ==
=== Hinduism and Indology ===
- Hymns from the Golden Age: Selected Hymns from the Rig Veda With Yogic Interpretation. Motilal Banarsidass Publications, 1986. ISBN 8120800729.
- In Search of the Cradle of Civilization (1995), with Georg Feuerstein and Subhash Kak
- Wisdom of the Ancient Seers: Mantras of the Rig Veda. Motilal Banarsidass Publishers (Pvt. Ltd), 1999. ISBN 8120811593.
- Arise Arjuna: Hinduism Resurgent in a New Century. Bloomsbury Publishing, 2018. ISBN 9388134982.
- Awaken Bharata: A Call for India’s Rebirth. Bloomsbury India, 2018. ISBN 9388271009.
- What Is Hinduism?. Bloomsbury India, 2018. ISBN 9789388038638.

=== Yoga, Vedanta and Ayurveda ===
1. Ayurvedic Healing. Passage Press, 1989. ISBN 1878423002.
2. Ayurveda and the Mind: The Healing of Consciousness. Motilal Banarsidass Publications, 2005. ISBN 812082010X.

==== Co-authored ====
1. The Yoga of Herbs: An Ayurvedic Guide to Herbal Medicine. Motilal Banarsidass Publications, 2004. ISBN 8120820347.

== See also ==
- Dayananda Saraswati (Arsha Vidya)
- Voice of India
- Georg Feuerstein
