= NHT =

NHT may refer to:

- N-Hexyltryptamine, a tryptamine derivative
- National historic trail, in the United States
- National Housing Trust, organization of Jamaica
- Natural Heritage Trust, an Australian government body
- Naval Historical Team, of the United States Navy
- NHT Airlines, a defunct Brazilian airline
- NHT Loudspeakers, an American electronics company
- Number theoretic Hilbert transform
- Ometepec Náhuatl language
- RAF Northolt, a Royal Air Force station in Greater London
- Union Station (Northampton, Massachusetts)
