= N. S. Rajaram =

Indian academic and Hindutva Ideologue (1943–2019)

Navaratna Srinivasa Rajaram
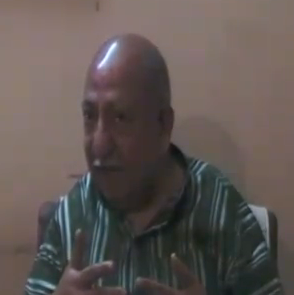
- Born: 22 September 1943; Mysore, Karnataka, India
- Died: 11 December 2019 (aged 76); Bengaluru, Karnataka, India
- Known for: Indigenous Aryans

Navaratna Srinivasa Rajaram (22 September 1943 – 11 December 2019) was an Indian academic at University of Indiana, scholar and NASA scientist. He is notable for propounding the "Indigenous Aryans" hypothesis, asserting that the Vedic period was extremely advanced from a scientific view-point, and claiming of having deciphered the Indus script. Academics find his scholarship to be composed of dishonest polemics in service of a communal agenda.

== Personal life ==
Rajaram was born on 22 September 1943 into a Deshastha Madhva Brahmin family in Mysore. His grandfather Navaratna Rama Rao was a colonial scholar and vernacular author of regional fame. He graduated from National High School in Bangalore. He received his early schooling from Mysore, and went on to receive a Doctoral degree in Mathematics from the University of Indiana. He thereafter worked at the University as a professor for two decades. He received a PhD degree in mathematics from Indiana University Bloomington in 1976 and taught in American universities for over 20 years, including stints at Kent State University and Lockheed Corporation. He died in Bengaluru on 11 December 2019 at the age of 76.

== Indology ==
Rajaram extensively published on topics related to ancient Indian history and Indian archaeology, alleging a Eurocentric bias in Indology and Sanskrit scholarship. He advocated the Indigenous Aryans hypothesis and rejected Indo-Aryan migration theory as a fabricated version of history devised for missionary and colonial interests, and later propounded by left-liberals and Marxists. Dating the Vedas to circa 7000 BC, he also propounded that the Harappan civilization of the Indus Valley corresponds with the end phase of the Vedic Age and thus hypothesized it to be a part of Vedic era.

In Puratattva, the journal of the Indian Archaeological Society, Rajaram claimed that "Vedic Indians" might have taught the Pharaohs of Egypt to build the Pyramids. He also asserted the concept of secularism to be irrelevant to a pluralistic state, which ancient Hindu India was. He also claimed to have deciphered the Indus script and equated it to late Vedic Sanskrit. He has been critical of Marxist historian, "For all its monopoly of the Indian history establishment, this influential group calling itself Marxists has made no contribution to history. The central theme of their work is that Hindus have contributed nothing to Indian civilisation: Everything from the Vedas and Sanskrit to science and mathematics is a foreign import."

=== Criticism ===
In 2000, Rajaram flaunted a horse on an Indus seal as a path-breaking discovery that supposedly lend credence to the belief that Aryans were the actual inhabitants of the Indus Valley Civilization, until Michael Witzel and Steve Farmer exposed the fraud in the Frontline magazine later that year. Asko Parpola, professor of Indology at Helsinki University, commented:

It is sad that India's heritage should be exploited by some individuals – usually people with little or no academic credentials – who for political or personal motives are ready even to falsify evidence. In order to vindicate their ideology and promote their own ends, these persons appeal to the feelings of the 'common man' who, with full reason, is proud of his or her country's grand heritage. Thus far Rajaram has got away with this dishonesty because the scholarly community has not considered this work worthy of consideration: it has been taken more or less for granted that any sensible person can see through this trash and recognize it as such. However, the escalation of this nonsensical propaganda now demands the issue to be addressed.

His claims of having deciphered the Indus script were universally rejected. Noted epigraphist and an expert in Indus scripts-- Iravatham Mahadevan dismissed Jha-Rajaram work as a "non-starter" and "completely invalid", that even mis-analysed the direction of reading. Speaking from the chair of the President, on the occasion of the 2001 session of Indian History Congress, as to the recent advances in the deciphering of the Indus Script, Mahadevan noted:

.....He recognises that he has to demolish the current theories if the model of decipherment presented by him is to be accepted. And he goes about the job of demolition with gusto in his inimitable polemical style......

Rajaram's outbursts speak for themselves and need no annotation. The first part of the book is not about academic research on the technical problem of deciphering an unknown script. It is crude communal propaganda with obvious political overtones, betraying deep mistrust of foreigners and alien ideologies and intolerance towards religious and linguistic minorities......

It is claimed that some of the mathematical formulas of the Sulbasutras are found in the Indus inscriptions... The method is so flexible and easy to follow that one can, without much effort, read into the Indus texts almost any mathematical formula...

Thapar noted Rajaram's writings to resemble nineteenth century tracts that were evidently unfamiliar with tools of historiography but were sprinkled with programming references; so as to suggest scientific objectivity. She also noted that anybody who disagreed with him was branded a Marxist. K. N. Panikkar criticized his works to be a communal intervention in historiography that was not an academic exercise in quest of truth but rather a political project knowingly undertaken with a cavalier attitude to the established norms of the discipline, so as to hamper the secular fabric of the society and lead to the establishment of a Hindu state. Endowed with the support of the ruling party, this succeeded in floating an alternative narrative of history and turning history into a contentious issue in popular discourse.

Sudeshna Guha notes him to be a sectarian non-scholar. Cynthia Ann Humes criticized Rajaram's Politics of History as a polemic work whilst Suraj Bhan noted it to be a demonstration of historical revisionism. Michael Witzel noted him to be an autochthonous writer, whose books were a mythological rewrite of history and were designed for the expatriate Indians of the 21st century, who sought a " largely imagined, glorious but lost distant past".

== See also ==
- Indigenous Aryans
- Indo-Aryan migration
- Nationalism and ancient history

== Bibliography ==
- Rajaram, N S (2019). The Vanished Raj A Memoir of Princely India. Prism Books Private Limited. ISBN 9789388478113.
- Dead Sea Scrolls and Crisis of Christianity Minerva Press, London.
- Aryan Invasion of India: The Myth and the Truth. Voice of India. 1993.
