= Shikaripura Ranganatha Rao =

Indian archaeologist (1922–2013)

- Born: Shikaripura Ranganatha Rao; 1 July 1922; Anandapuram, Sagar taluk, Shimoga district, erstwhile Mysore State (now Karnataka)
- Died: 3 January 2013 (aged 90)
- Occupation: Archaeologist

Shikaripura Ranganatha Rao (1 July 1922 – 3 January 2013), commonly known as Dr. S. R. Rao, was an Indian archaeologist who led teams credited with discoveries of a number of Harappan sites, including the port city Lothal and Bet Dwarka in Gujarat.

== Biography and career ==
Rao was born into a Madhwa Brahmin family on 1 July 1922. He completed his education from Mysore University.

=== Indus script decipherment ===
While mainstream scholarship is generally in agreement with Rao's approach of comparison, the details of his decipherment have not been accepted, and the script is still generally considered undeciphered. John E. Mitchiner, after dismissing some more fanciful attempts at decipherment, mentions that "a more soundly-based but still greatly subjective and unconvincing attempt to discern an Indo-European basis in the script has been that of Rao".

In a 2002 interview with The Hindu, Rao asserted his faith in his decipherment, saying that "Recently we have confirmed that it is definitely an Indo-Aryan language and deciphered. Prof. W. W. De Grummond of Florida State University has written in his article that I have already deciphered it."

=== Identification of Dwarka ===
At Kushasthali (Bet Dwarka), a strip of sand and stone situated 30 km (19 mi) north of town of Dwarka, Rao and his team found a wall (560 metres long) visible on the shore itself. Dating of pottery found here gave a date of 1528 BCE based on thermoluminescence dating.

Rao asserts that the unearthed remains at Dwarka were the historical city that was home to Krishna, believed to be the eighth Avatar of Vishnu.

== Publications ==
- Lothal and the Indus Civilisation, Bombay: Asia Publishing House, ISBN 0-210-22278-6 (1973)
- Lothal: A Harappan Port Town (1955 - 1962), Vols. I and II, Memoirs of the Archaeological Survey of India, no.78, New Delhi, ASIN: B0006E4EAC (1979 and 1985)
- Lothal, New Delhi: the Director General, Archaeological Survey of India (1985)
- Dawn and Devolution of the Indus Civilization, ISBN 81-85179-74-3, Delhi: Aditya Prakashan (1991)
- New Trends in Indian Art and Archaeology: S.R. Rao's 70th Birthday Felicitation Volumes, edited by B.U. Nayak and N.C. Ghosh, 2 vols. (1992)
- New Frontiers of Archaeology, Bombay: Popular Prakashan, ISBN 81-7154-689-7 (1994)
- The Lost City of Dvaraka, National Institute of Oceanography, ISBN 81-86471-48-0 (1999)
- Marine Archaeology in India, Delhi: Publications Division, ISBN 81-230-0785-X (2001)
