= Voice of India =

Publishing house based in Delhi, India

- Status: Active
- Founded: 1981; 45 years ago
- Founder: Ram Swarup; Sita Ram Goel
- Country of origin: India
- Headquarters location: Shanti Mohalla, Gandhi Nagar, Delhi
- Key people: Rohit Meet (MD)
- Publication types: Books and academic journals
- Nonfiction topics: Hindu nationalism, Hindutva, criticism of monotheism
- Official website: https://www.voiceofin.com/

Voice of India (VOI) is a publishing house based in New Delhi, India, that specialises in Hindu nationalist books and serves as an important tool in the propagation of Hindutva.

== History ==
Voice of India was founded in 1981 by Ram Swarup and Sita Ram Goel. In 1948, Swarup, who used to work for an anti-communist think-tank, convinced Goel to denounce communism and soon, both of them embraced nationalism in their way to hardliner Hindutva politics, whilst being actively sympathized by Rashtriya Swayamsevak Sangh (RSS). They though renounced from partaking in active political activism and instead chose to insert themselves in the field of metapolitics, confronting the Nehruvian secular establishments with a Hindu world view. By 1949, Goel was writing for the Organiser, a RSS journal and later that year, both of them were running an anti-communist think-tank from Kolkata. However, over the years, they grew dissatisfied with RSS's unwillingness to develop a hardcore Hindu ideology to fight the three main enemies of India-Christianity, Islam and Marxism, and in 1981, Goel established VOI as a protest against the anti-intellectual culture of RSS.

Goel, in his autobiography-- How I Became a Hindu wrote of VOI's objective to "inform Hindu Society about its own great heritage, as also the dangers it faces" and publish Hindu-nationalist literature. A year after the foundation, Goel had made an appeal for donation, that read:-

Hindu society and culture are faced with a crisis. There is a united front of entrenched alien forces to disrupt and discredit the perennial values of the Indian ethos. All who care for India need to know what is happening and what is to be if a major tragedy is to be averted. Voice of India aims at providing an ideological defense of Hindu society and culture through a series of publications. Some of these publications have already been brought out and received wide appreciation. In this fight for men’s minds, our only weapon is truth. Truth must be told, as much about Hindu society and culture as about the alien ideologies which have been on the war-path since the days of foreign domination over the Hindu homeland.

According to Pirbhai, the house was established to provide the Sangh Parivar, which till then lived on borrowed slogans, a Hindu ideology of its own. Attempts at refutation of the Indo-Aryan migration theory was also a core objective.

== Authors ==
Voice of India is associated with numerous journalists, historians, social commentators and academics such as Arun Shourie, David Frawley, Shrikant Talageri, Francois Gautier, Harsh Narain, Subhash Kak, Koenraad Elst, and N. S. Rajaram; nearly all of whom advocate for Hindu nationalism in varying ways and self-identify as Bauddhik Kshatriyas ("intellectual warriors"). Most of the authors do not have any subject-specific scholarship and are Islamophobic. Witzel has described the affiliated writers to be part of a "closely knit, self-adulatory group that churned out long identical passages, copied in cottage industry fashion". Bergunder recognises that not all authors published by Voice of India are on the extreme of the Hindu nationalist spectrum.

Almost every major colonial-era Hindu intellectual and especially Swami Vivekananda is derived from.

== Publication themes ==
Monotheistic religions are deemed to be inherently violent, non-democratic and totalitarian in nature and thus, practice-able only by lower kinds of minds. Non-deserving of any respect, they are deemed to be contemptible demonic diseases which masquerade as religions and similar to Nazism et al., shall be deemed as the foremost threats to the welfare of the humanity and Hinduism. Social services by Christian Missionary groups are deemed as a camouflage for their ultimate intent of baptizing people from other faiths and advocacy for secession. Anti-Muslim literature are published and reprinted in bulk and Muslims are portrayed as the primary reason behind the downfall of the erstwhile Hindu glory. History of Hindu holocaust at the hands of Islamic invaders is prominently featured and conversions to Hinduism are heavily advocated for liberation from the prison-houses of these Abrahamic religions. Kondo notes that Judaism, despite being a monotheistic religion, is spared with any criticism and is even occasionally praised courtesy their original pluralistic roots.

In contrast, Hinduism is regarded as the very representative of Indian-ness, which had supposedly sought to create a cultural empire rather than an imperialist military driven one. Additionally, a global appealing brand of Hinduism is crafted in a bid to attract Western spiritual seekers into the fold of Hinduism. The Hindus are routinely asked to de-colonise their minds from Western schools of thought; the Indigenous Aryans theory is propounded as a rebut to the theory of Indo-Aryan migration and a revisionist history of science is sketched that purports for the presaging of all modern mathematical and scientific advances, in the Vedas. Concepts of Sarva Dharma Sama Bhava—that all religions are equally true and lead to the same end, are rejected as anti-Hindu school of thought.

== Audience ==
The works are of excellent typographical quality and widely available in print as well as over the web; there appears to exist a significant audience across the globe. They have been used by Bharatiya Janata Party and its allied organs to legitimize the basis of their political campaigns.

== Reception ==
Meera Nanda notes VOI to be the most strident medium of expression for Hindu triumphalism, wherein a common theme of Hindu superiority is put forward and which is increasingly penetrating public discourse in India. She observes VOI to be on the far right of even RSS and that its authors considering the old guards of RSS (and Bharatiya Janata Party) to be too soft on Islam, blame them for failing to provide a sound defense of Hinduism against other Abrahamic religions. Sebastian Kim notes that Goel and Voice of India are not officially associated with the Sangh Parivar or other mainstream Hindu nationalist groups, and that the latter had purposefully distanced themselves from Goel and VOI due to the shrill rhetoric. Moed Pirbhai notes an instance, where Goel was chided even by L. K. Advani, of Babri Masjid fame, for excessively strong language. Others have also noted of this non-linkage to have aided in VOI's impressions of being a neutral apolitical institution. Nanda also notes an increasing marriage of VOI with the European-American far right as evidenced from the popularity of Koenraad Elst, François Gautier et al.

Kondo observes cherry-picking of data and abuse of history to be a prominent tool in VOI publications; whilst destruction of temples, forced conversions etc. are highlighted to attest the true essence of Islam, the publications don't mention the numerous cases where Hinduism and Islam have co-existed peacefully for eras. Thomas Charles Nagy whilst assessing Ishan Sharan's The Myth of Saint Thomas and the Mylapore Shiva Temple and other works (all published by VOI) noted an aggressive and absolutist tone coupled with an affinity for manipulating the history, which was guided by the broader political aspects of present-day-India and the Hindutva ideology.

Pirbhai notes degradation of Islam as well as the derision of Muslims to be two core themes of VOI. He also remarks that the most repeated statement in Voice of India writings seems to be that ‘the problem is not Muslims but Islam’. According to Heuze, the Voice of India authors draw their inspiration from democratic texts, European thought and secular and democratic polemicists to justify their anti-Islamic "crusade" while simultaneously distancing themselves from everything that could be perceived as an endorsement of the extreme-right. Kim notes that the VOI publications have been integral resources behind the anti-Muslim and anti-Christian campaigns of the Indian Hindu-right. Malini Parthasarathy notes them to be at the forefront of the resurgence of Hindu nationalism in India.

Other scholars have noted its books to pursue a revisionist project centered around an "epistemic obsession with primordial Aryanism". Bergunder deems these non-scholarly revisionist attempts as a tool to fulfill their broader ideological agenda of rejecting the subaltern discourse. Indologists Michael Witzel and Steve Farmer writes:

In the past few decades, a new kind of history has been propagated by a vocal group of Indian writers, few of them trained historians, who lavishly praise and support each other's works. Their aim is to rewrite Indian history from a nationalistic and religious point of view. [...] Whole publishing firms, such as the Voice of India and Aditya Prakashan, are devoted to propagating their ideas.
