= Edwin Bryant (Indologist) =

American Indologist (born 1957)

Edwin Francis Bryant
- Born: August 31, 1957 (age 69)
- Occupation: Professor of religions of India

Academic background
- Education: Columbia University

Academic work
- Discipline: Religious Studies
- Institutions: Rutgers University
- Main interests: Yoga, Hindu philosophy

Edwin Francis Bryant is an Anglo-Italian Indologist. As of 2024, he is professor of religions of India at Rutgers University. He has published seven books and authored a number of articles on Vedic history, yoga, and the Krishna tradition. In his research engagements, he lived several years in India where he studied Sanskrit and was trained with several Indian pundits.

== Academic career ==
Edwin Bryant received his Ph.D. in Indic languages and Cultures from Columbia University in 1997 with a dissertation on the "Indigenous Aryans Debate". He taught Hinduism at Harvard University for three years, and is presently professor of Religions of India at Rutgers University where he teaches courses on Hindu philosophy and religion. He has received numerous fellowships.

In addition to his academic courses, Bryant currently teaches workshops at yoga studios and teacher training courses throughout the country. His lectures and workshop engagements include: The Bhagavad Gita, The Yoga Sutras, Indian Philosophy and Bhakti, and the Krishna Tradition. His Indian Philosophy workshop includes "the foundational philosophical texts of yoga and examine the underpinnings and essential principles of the classical schools of Hindu philosophy... beginning with their foundations in the Upanishads, the earliest mystico-philosophical tradition of India, and evolving into the Yoga Sutras, Vedanta Sutras, Bhagavad Gita, and other post-Vedic texts."

== Works ==
Bryant has published seven books and authored a number of articles on Vedic history, yoga, and Krishna-bhakti tradition. He is an expert on Krishna tradition and has translated the story of Krishna from the Sanskrit Bhagavata Purana.

- Edwin F. Bryant, The Quest for the Origins of Vedic Culture: The Indo-Aryan Migration Debate. — Oxford; New York: Oxford University Press, 2001. — xi, 387 p. — ISBN 0-19-513777-9, ISBN 0-19-516947-6 (pbk.)
- Edwin F. Bryant, Krishna: The Beautiful Legend of God; Śrīmad Bhāgavata Purāṇa, Book X; with chapters 1, 6 and 29-31 from Book XI, Translated with an introduction and notes by Edwin F. Bryant. — London: Penguin Books, 2003. — xxxi, 515 p. — ISBN 0-14-044799-7
- Edwin F. Bryant and Maria L. Ekstrand, The Hare Krishna Movement: The Postcharismatic Fate of a Religious Transplant. New York; Chichester: Columbia University Press, 2004. — xix, 448 p. — ISBN 0-231-12256-X
- Edwin F. Bryant and Laurie L. Patton, Indo-Aryan Controversy: Evidence and Inference in Indian History. London: Routledge, 2005. — 522 p. — ISBN 0-7007-1462-6 (cased), ISBN 0-7007-1463-4 (pbk.)
- Edwin F. Bryant, Krishna: a Sourcebook. Oxford; New York: Oxford University Press, 2007. — xiv, 575 p. — ISBN 0-19-514891-6 (hbk.) ISBN 0-19-514892-4 (pbk.)
- Edwin F. Bryant, The Yoga Sūtras of Patañjali: A New Edition, Translation, and Commentary with Insights from the Traditional Commentators; illustrated. New York: North Point Press, 2009. — xvii, 598 p. — ISBN 0-86547-736-1
- Edwin F. Bryant, Bhakti yoga: Tales and teachings from the Bhāgavata Purāṇa, New York, North Point Press. 2017. 688 p. — ISBN 0-86547-775-2

=== The Quest for the Origins of Vedic Culture ===
Bryant is the author of The Quest for the Origins of Vedic Culture (Oxford University Press, 2001).

J. P. Mallory says the book:

... systematically exposes the logical weaknesses of most of the arguments that support the consensus of either side. This is not only an important work in the field of Indo-Aryan studies but a long overdue challenge for scholarly fair play.

Michael Witzel writes:

A balanced description and evaluation of the two century old debate dealing with the origins of the Indo-Aryan speaking peoples of South Asia. [Bryant] presents both sides of the issue, that is the traditional western, linguistic and philological consensus of immigration from Central Asia, and the more recent Indian position that denies any immigration and that asserts an indigenous South Asian origin. He probes for loopholes on both sides....

=== Indo-Aryan Controversy: Evidence and Inference in Indian History ===
This book, edited by Edwin Bryant and Laurie Patton, contains a series of articles by proponents of the "Indigenous Aryans" position and scholars of the Indo-Aryan migration theory, with some alternative interpretations. According to Edwin Bryant, most of the evidence regarding the origin of Indo-Aryans is inconclusive and he is not convinced of the Indo-Aryan migrations theory, but he is also not convinced of an "Out-of-India position", since the support for it is not significant. He notes that the discovery of Indo-Aryan language family was foundational to the investigation of the origins of the Western civilization, and the relationship between the Indo-Aryan family and the remaining Indo-European languages must be established. However, he states: "... I find most of the evidence that has been marshalled to support the theory of Indo-Aryan migrations into the subcontinent to be inconclusive upon careful scrutiny, but on the other, I have not been convinced by an Out-of-India position, since there has been very little of significance offered so far in support of it."

In a review, Sanskrit linguist Stephanie W. Jamison likened the effort of the volume to calls to "teach the controversy" by the proponents of Intelligent Design. She states that the Indo-Aryan controversy is a "manufactured one" with a non-scholarly, religio-nationalistic attack on scholarly consensus and the editors (Bryant and Patton) have unwittingly provided it a gloss of intellectual legitimacy. The editors are not linguists, she contends, and they have accepted patently weak or false linguistic arguments. So their apparently even-handed assessment lacks merit and cannot be regarded as objective scholarship. Historian Sudeshna Guha concurs, saying that Bryant does not probe into the epistemology of evidence and hence perceives the opposing viewpoints unproblematic. On the contrary, she holds that the timing and renewed vigour of the indigenist arguments during the 1990s demonstrates unscholarly opportunism. Fosse and Deshpande's contributions to the volume provide a critical analysis of the historiography and the nationalist and colonial agendas behind it. She also holds Bryant's desire to present what he calls the views of "Indian scholars" for "reconstructing the religious and cultural history of their own country" as misleading because it patently ignores the views of historians of India who have done so since the beginning of the twentieth century.

=== Translation of the Yoga Sutras and interpretation ===
In 2007 Bryant completed a translation of the Yoga Sutras and their traditional commentaries. The translation was published in 2009 by North Point Press as The Yoga Sūtras of Patañjali (with Insights from the Traditional Commentators). In his article History Repeats Itself (Yoga Journal, Nov 2001), the author adds that "Our modern world, more than any other epoch in human history, has universalized and idolized consumerism—the indulgence of the senses of the mind—as the highest goal of life." In yoga, that creates unwanted influences, where "Our vrittis, the turbulences of the mind born from desire, are out of control." Control and elimination of vrittis comprise significant portion of yoga practices and observances (yama and niyama) that culminates with nirodha, an arrested state of mind capable of one-pointedness. Otherwise, if unwanted vrittis are allowed to predominate, "We risk missing the whole point of the practice".

In the interview Inside the Yoga Tradition, Bryant describes some tenets of his interpretation of the Yoga Sutras of Patanjali, "I stress in my commentary that Patanjali is emphatic about the yamas and niyamas (vows and observances). We can't say that what he is teaching is applicable only to the time period in which he codified the Sutras or that they are only for Hindus living in India. Patanjali asserts that yamas and niyamas are great universal vows. He didn't have to further qualify them—universal means no exception whatsoever."

Discussing theistic overtones in Yoga Sutras of Patanjali and the practice of ishvara-pranidhana (commitment or surrender to God), David Gordon White points out in his The Yoga Sutra of Patanjali - A Biography, "Edwin Bryant, who, in his recent splendid commentary on the Yoga Sutra, notes that Vijnanabhiksu considered ishvara-pranidhana to refer to the practice of devotion to Krishna, the Lord of the Bhagavat Gita. Bryant clearly aligns himself with this interpretation of the term, reading ishvara-pranidhana as submission to a personal god and asserting that most yogis over the past two millennia have been associated with devotional sects." Similar view is expressed by a commentator of Yoga Sutras of Patanjali (1999), Baba Hari Dass, "Ishvara pranidhana (surrender to God) is a method of the devotional path (Bhakti Yoga)".

== See also ==
- J. P. Mallory
- Jim G. Shaffer
