= Koenraad Elst =

Right wing Hindutva activist

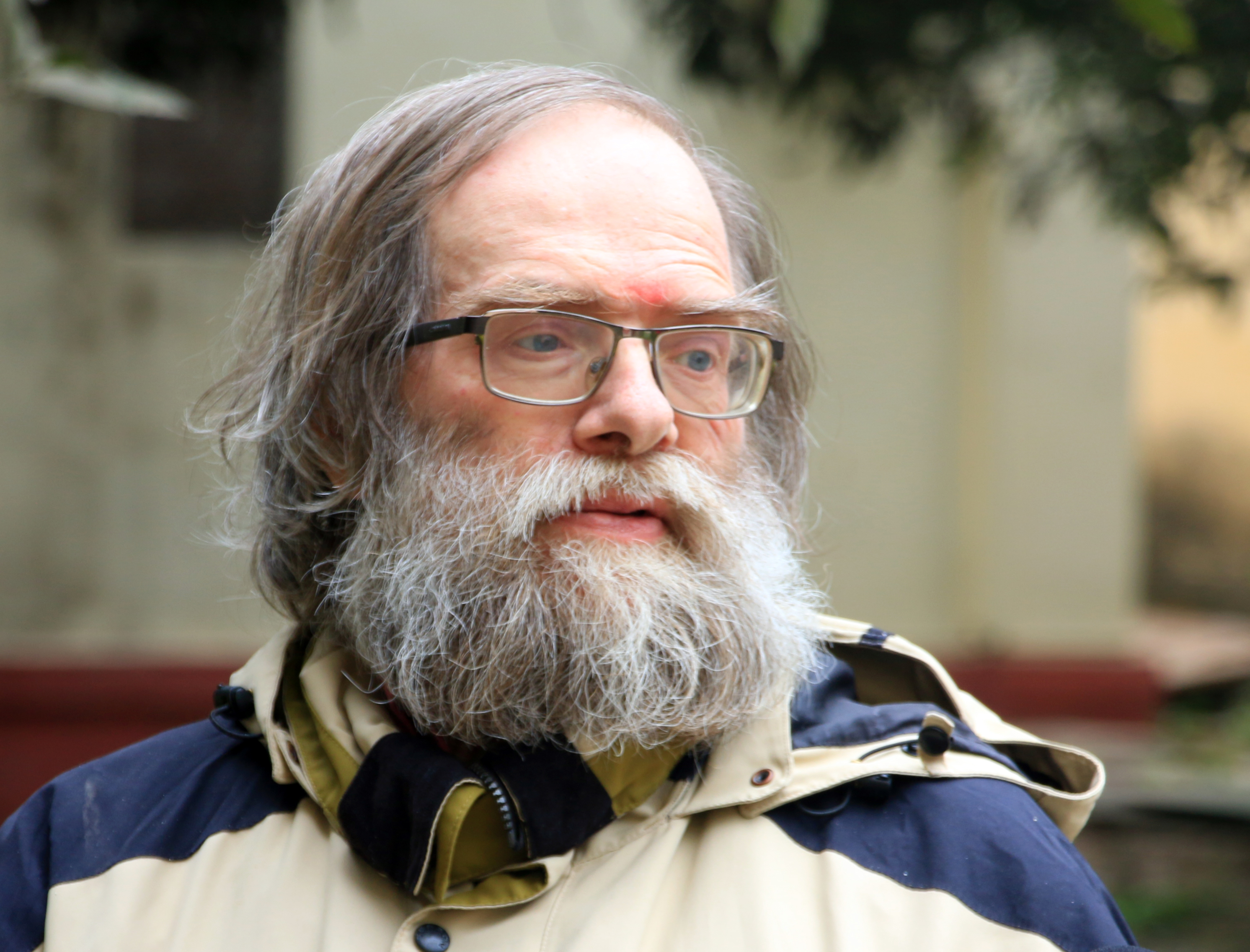
- Elst in Varanasi, Uttar Pradesh in 2018.
- Born: 7 August 1959 (age 67); Leuven, Belgium
- Education: Katholieke Universiteit Leuven; Benaras Hindu University
- Occupation: Author

Koenraad Elst (Dutch pronunciation: [ˈkunraːt ˈɛlst]; born 7 August 1959) is a Belgian author, known primarily for his adherence to the Hindutva ideology and support of the Out of India theory, which is regarded as pseudohistorical by mainstream scholarship. Scholars accuse him of promoting Islamophobia.

== Early life and education ==
Elst was born into a Flemish Catholic family.

He graduated in Indology, Sinology and philosophy from the Catholic University of Leuven. During his student days, he was involved with Flemish nationalism. Between 1988 and 1992, Elst was at the Banaras Hindu University. In 1999, he received a PhD in Asian Studies from Leuven on Hindu revivalism; his doctoral dissertation was published as Decolonizing the Hindu Mind. Prema Kurien notes Elst to be unique among Hindutva-leaning scholars in that he had a relevant academic degree.

== Works and ideology ==
=== Indigenous Aryan theories ===
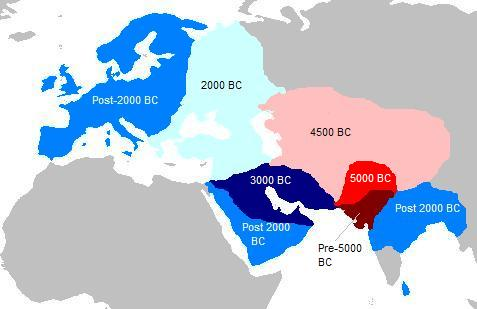
Map based on The Aryan Non-Invasionist Model by Koenraad Elst

In two books, Update on the Aryan Invasion Debate (1999) and Asterisk in Bhāropīyasthān (2007), Elst argues against the academically accepted view that the Indo-European languages originated in the Kurgan culture of the Central Asian steppes and that the migrations to Indian subcontinent in the second millennium BCE brought a proto-Indo-European language with them. He instead proposes that the language originated in India and it spread to Middle East and Europe when the Aryans, (who were indigenous) migrated out. According to Elst, the linguistic data are a "soft" type of evidence and are compatible with a variety of scenarios. To Elst, dominant linguistic theories may be compatible with an out-of-India scenario for Indo-European expansion.

One of the few authors to use paleolinguistics, he is deemed as one of the leading proponents of the Indigenous Aryans ("Out of India") fringe theory. The theory has been rejected by the scholarly community and is not deemed as a serious competitor to the Kurgan hypothesis, except by some authors in India. He has also written against the "Aryan Invasion" theory to defend the fringe Out of India theory in a blog piece for the Indian diaspora think tank Bridge India.

=== Hindutva and Islamophobia ===
Elst was an editor of the New Right Flemish nationalist journal Teksten, Kommentaren en Studies from 1992 to 1995, focusing on criticism of Islam. He had associations with Vlaams Blok, a far-right Flemish Movement political party. He has also been a regular contributor to The Brussels Journal, a controversial conservative blog.

Every Muslim is a Sita who must be released from Ravana's prison. We should help Muslims in freeing themselves from Islam …

— Koenraad Elst

In Ram Janmabhoomi vs Babri Masjid, Elst argues that the birthplace of the Hindu god-king Rama corresponds with the site of Babri Masjid, and he portrays Islam as a fanatical and bigoted faith. The book was published by Voice of India, a publication house that has attracted substantial criticism for publishing anti-Muslim literature, and describes its own work as furthering Hindu nationalism. The book was though praised by L. K. Advani, a former deputy Prime Minister of India who commanded an important role in the demolition of the Babri Masjid. In Ayodhya and After (1991), Elst was even more explicit in his support of the demolition of the Babri Masjid and termed the demolition an exercise in national integration which provided "an invitation to the Muslim Indians to reintegrate themselves into the society and culture from which their ancestors were cut off by fanatical rulers and their thought police, the theologians". In another interview, Elst went on to claim that it was a justified act of revenge which enforced fears of Hindu repercussion, thus curtailing Muslim violence. Elst has since claimed to reject the use of violence in the demolition; he has urged Muslims to accept the construction of a peace monument on the site.

An intellectual heir of the school of thought championed by Ram Swarup and Sita Ram Goel— the founders of the Voice of India, who were themselves highly critical of both Christianity and Islam—Elst is one of the publishing house's most prominent authors, and he adopts their hard-line stance against the two religions in his book. Elst argues that there existed a universal spirituality among all the races and faiths, prior to the introduction of ”Semitic” faiths which corrupted it. In Decolonizing the Hindu Mind, he contends that the "need for 'reviving' Hinduism spring from the fact that the said hostile ideologies (mostly Islam) have managed to eliminate Hinduism physically in certain geographical parts and social segments of India, and also (mostly the Western ideologies) to neutralize the Hindu spirit among many nominal Hindus."

He is a vocal proponent of Hindutva, a Hindu nationalist movement which is typically associated with the Indian far-right and supports the Bharatiya Janata Party. Elst perceives Hindutva as a tool to decolonize the mental and cultural state of Indians and return to the past days of (supposed) Hindu glory. He has written in support of the view that the "Vedic science" was highly advanced and may be only understood by a Hindu mystic. The Saffron Swastika is widely regarded to be his magnum opus, which argues against the idea that the brand of Hindutva practiced by the Bharatiya Janata Party (BJP) / Rashtriya Swayamsevak Sangh are fascist in ideology. L. K. Advani had high regards for the work, terming Elst as a 'great historian' and even carried a "heavily marked" copy of the book from which he freely quoted the passages that discussed him.

In other essays and conferences, Elst has supported outright attacks on the enemy ideology of Islam which, in his opinion, is supposedly inseparable with terrorism and hence, must be destroyed. He calls for an Indianization of Muslims and Christians by forcing them to accept the supremacy of Hindu culture and terms it as the Final Solution for the Muslim Problem. In his 1992 book, Negationism in India: Concealing the Record of Islam, Elst attempts to demonstrate that there exists a prohibition of criticism of Islam in India and accuses secular historians (including the likes of Romila Thapar, Bipan Chandra, Ram Sharan Sharma et al.) of suffering from "Hindu Cowardice" wherein they ignore Muslim crimes against Hindu communities, in order to fulfill their "Marxist agenda".

== Reception ==
Anthropologist Thomas Blom Hansen describes Elst as a "Belgian Catholic of a radical anti-Muslim persuasion who tries to make himself useful as a 'fellow traveller' of the Hindu nationalist movement". Historian Sarvepalli Gopal deemed Elst to be "a Catholic practitioner of polemics" who was fairly oblivious of modern historiographical methods. Meera Nanda deems him to be a far-right Hindu cum Flemish nationalist. Elst has engaged in historical revisionism and has been described variedly as a Hindu fundamentalist, pro-Hindutva right-wing ideologue, Hindutva apologist and Hindutva propagandist.

Meera Nanda has accused Elst of exploiting the writings of his intellectual forefathers over Voice of India, to "peddle the worst kind of Islamophobia imaginable". Sanjay Subrahmanyam similarly deems Islamophobia as the common ground between Elst and the traditional Indian far right.

== Influences ==
Anders Behring Breivik, a Norwegian far-right terrorist, responsible for the 2011 Norway attacks extensively borrowed from his works, in writing his manifesto. The manifesto, among other things sought to deport all Muslims from Europe and quoted Elst in asserting the existence of a massive movement that was aimed to ''deny the large-scale and long-term crimes against humanity committed by Islam''.
