= Jim G. Shaffer =

American archaeologist (born 1944)

Jim G. Shaffer (born 1944) is an American archaeologist and professor of anthropology at Case Western Reserve University.

== Education ==
Shaffer holds a B.A. (1965) and M.A. (1967) in Anthropology from Arizona State University. He also has a Ph.D. (1972) in Anthropology from University of Wisconsin–Madison.

== Career ==
Shaffer is known for his studies on the Indus Valley civilization. According to him, there is no archaeological indication of an Aryan migration into northwestern India during or after the decline of the Harappan city culture. Instead, Shaffer has argued for "a series of cultural changes reflecting indigenous cultural developments." According to Shaffer, linguistic change has mistakenly been attributed to migrations of people. Shaffer gives two possible alternative explanations for the similarities between Sanskrit and western languages. The first is a linguistic relationship with a "Zagrosian family of language linking Elamite and Dravidian on the Iranian Plateau," as proposed by McAlpin; according to Shaffer "linguistic similarities may have diffused west from the plateau as a result of the extensive trading networks linking cultures in the plateau with those in Mesopotamia and beyond," while also linking with the Kelteminar culture in Central Asia. (Note: According to Franklin Southworth, "The Dravidian languages, now spoken mainly in peninsular India, form one of two main branches of the Zagrosian language family, whose other main branch consists of Elamitic and Brahui.") Yet, Shaffer also notes that the Harappan culture was not extensively tied to this network in the third century BCE, leaving the possibility that "membership in a basic linguistic family - Zagrosian - may account for some of the linguistic similarities of later periods." The second possibility is that "such linguistic similarities are a result of post-second millennium B.C. contacts with the west." According to Shaffer, "[o]nce codified, it was advantageous for the emerging hereditary social elites to stabilize such linguistic traits with the validity of the explanations offered in the literature enhancing their social position."

== Publications ==
- Jim G. Shaffer (1984). "The Indo-Aryan Invasions: Cultural Myth and Archaeological Reality". In John R Lukacs (ed.). The People of South Asia: The Biological Anthropology of India, Pakistan and Nepal. New York: Plenum Press. pp. 77–88.
- Prehistoric Baluchistan: With Excavation Report on Said Qala Tepe.
- A Honaki Phase Site on the Lower Verde River, Arizona.
- Jim G. Schaffer (1995). ""Cultural tradition and Palaeoethnicity in South Asian Archaeology"". In Ed. George Erdosy (ed.). Indo-Aryans of Ancient South Asia. Walter de Gruyter. ISBN 3-11-014447-6.
- Jim G. Schaffer (1999). "Migration, Philology and South Asian Archaeology". In Bronkhorst; Deshpande (eds.). Aryan and Non-Aryan in South Asia. Harvard University, Department of Sanskrit and Indian Studies. ISBN 1-888789-04-2.
- Jim G. Schaffer (1993). "Reurbanization: The Eastern Punjab and Beyond". In H. Spodek; D.M. Srinivasan (eds.). Urban Form and Meaning in South Asia: The Shaping of Cities from Prehistoric to Precolonial Times. Studies in the History of Art No. 31. Washington DC: National Gallery of Art. pp. 53–67.
- Jim G. Shaffer (1992). "The Indus Valley, Baluchistan and Helmand Traditions: Neolithic Through Bronze Age". In R. W. Ehrich (ed.). Chronologies in Old World Archaeology (Second ed.). Chicago: University of Chicago Press. pp. I:441-464, II:425-446.

== Sources ==
- Shaffer, Jim G. (2013) [1984]. "Indo-Aryan Invasions: Myth or Reality?". In Lukacs, John (ed.). The People of South Asia: The Biological Anthropology of India, Pakistan, and Nepal. Springer.
- Shaffer, J.; Lichtenstein, D. (1999). "Migration, Philology and South Asian Archaeology". In Bronkhorst, J.; Deshpande, M. (eds.). In Aryan and Non-Aryan in South Asia: Evidence, Interpretation and Ideology. Harvard University Press.
