= Prema Kurien =

Indian-American sociologist (born 1963)

Prema Ann Kurien
- Born: May 10, 1963 (age 63); Thiruvalla, Kerala, India
- Education: Delhi School of Economics; Brown University
- Occupation: Professor
- Organization: Syracuse University
- Notable work: Kaleidoscopic Ethnicity: International Migration and the Reconstruction of Community Identities in India
- Awards: Asia/Asian America book award, American Sociological Association
- Scientific career
- Fields: Sociology, Religion and human migration
- Thesis: Ethnicity, migration and social change: A study of three emigrant communities in Kerala, India (1993)
- Doctoral advisor: Dietrich Rueschemeyer
- Website: Maxwell Website

Prema Ann Kurien (born 1963) is an Indian American professor of sociology at the Maxwell School of Citizenship and Public Affairs of Syracuse University. She specializes in the interplay between religion and immigration experiences, with focus on people from India. She has written a number of articles and books on aspects of this subject. Her 2002 book Kaleidoscopic Ethnicity: International Migration and the Reconstruction of Community Identities in India was co-winner of the 2003 Asia/Asian America book award from the American Sociological Association.

== Birth and education ==
Prema Kurien was born in Kerala, India. She attended the Women's Christian College, Chennai, earning a BA in psychology in 1983, and the Delhi School of Economics, Delhi, where she gained an MA degree in sociology in 1986. After moving to the United States, she attended Brown University, earning M.A. and Ph.D. degrees in sociology in 1989 and 1993, respectively.

== Career ==
Kurien was visiting assistant professor at the Department of Sociology and Anthropology, Knox College, from 1992 to 1994, then assistant professor at the Department of Sociology and Director of the Human Diversity Program at Chapman University from 1994 to 1995. From 1995 to 2003 she was assistant professor at the Department of Sociology, University of Southern California, then obtained her present position of associate professor in the Department of Sociology of Syracuse University.

She has received postdoctoral fellowships and grants from the Carnegie Corporation, The Pew Charitable Trusts, the American Institute of Indian Studies and the Louisville Institute. She was a fellow and then an affiliate fellow at the Center for the Study of Religion in Princeton University from 2000 to 2003. She was a fellow of the Woodrow Wilson International Center for Scholars from September 2006 to May 2007.

Kurien has participated in the Association for the Sociology of Religion, and the Religion section of the American Sociological Association. She is a member of the editorial board of the American Sociological Review and the annual publication of Society for Asian North American Christian Studies. She is a member of the National Science Foundation Dissertation Panel. She was the president of the Society for the Scientific Study of Religion in 2021.

In 2022, Kurian was named the director for the South Asia Center (SAC) in the Moynihan Institute of Global Affairs.

In 2024, she was named the Daicoff Faculty Scholar at Maxwell.

== Publications ==
Kurien was editor of a special issue of the International Journal of Sociology and Social Policy, 2004, on The Impact of Immigrants on American Institutions. She has published many articles in peer-reviewed journals. Prema Kurien's books are:

- Prema A. Kurien (2002). Kaleidoscopic Ethnicity: International Migration and the Reconstruction of Community Identities in India. Rutgers University Press. p. 332. ISBN 081353089X.
- Prema A. Kurien (2007). A Place at the Table: Multiculturalism and the Development of an American Hinduism. Rutgers University Press. p. 320. ISBN 978-0813540566.

Her Kaleidoscopic Ethnicity is primarily an anthropological work. It investigates the ways in which Malayali migrants from three different Kerala communities handle the opportunities and challenges of working in the Gulf. Three villages are studied, one predominantly Muslim, one Hindu and one Christian. She shows how the different cultures of these three villages were shaped by their historical experience, and how they profoundly influenced the way in which the villagers coped with the new challenges.

In A Place at the Multicultural Table Kurien reviews the ways in which Hindu American organizations are trying to address the question of cultural identity for Hindu Americans, including immigrants and those born in the US. She looks at the emerging "American Hinduism", an organized, standardized and politicized version of the more diverse Hinduism of India. Kurien makes the point that most American Hindus have no connection to the small group of ideologues who lead Hindutva-related organisations in the US, but few actively oppose the Hindutva movement. The vast majority are silent, falling between the extremes.
