= Grover (surname) =

- Language: English, Punjabi

Grover is a surname found with people in India as well as with people of English ancestry. The two names, however, are distinct in formation and share no common origins.The Grovers from the undivided India were concentrated in the cities of Jhang, Multan, Mianwali, Lahore, Amritsar and Sialkot before the partition of India.

== Notable people ==
Notable individuals with the surname Grover include:

=== India ===
- Arjun Dass Grover, Indian ophthalmologist
- Anand Grover, lawyer activist on Indian law relating to homosexuality and HIV
- Anil Grover, Indian molecular biologist
- Amitesh Grover, Indian theatre director
- B. R. Grover, Indian historian
- Eva Grover, Indian actress
- Gulshan Grover (born 1955), Indian actor
- Karan Singh Grover (born 1982), Indian actor
- Karan Grover Karan V. Grover, Indian actor
- Lov Grover (born 1961), Indian-American computer scientist
- Manish Grover, Indian BJP politician
- Neeraj Grover, Indian TV executive of Neeraj Grover murder case
- Rajesh Kumar Grover, Indian oncologist
- Ravi Grover (born 1949), Indian nuclear scientist
- Sahaj Grover, Indian chess prodigy
- Shuchi Grover, Indian educator
- Sunil Grover (born 1977), Indian actor and comedian
- Teji Grover, Hindi poet, fiction writer, translator and painter
- Tim Grover, trainer of Michael Jordan
- Varun Grover (information scientist), Indian-American researcher
- Varun Grover (writer), lyricist and writer
- Vikas Grover, Indian actor
- Vinod Kumar Grover, Secretary of the Ministry of External Affairs of India
- Vrinda Grover, lawyer, researcher, and human rights and women's rights activist

=== Outside India ===
- A. D. Grover (1865–1927), American banjoist
- Antoni Grover (born 1980), Australian rules footballer
- Asa Grover (1818–1887), U.S. politician from Kentucky
- Cuvier Grover (1828–1885), U.S. Army officer
- Frank Grover, New Zealand politician
- Geoff Grover, Australian Rules footballer with St Kilda and Port Melbourne
- Henry Grover (1927–2005), U.S. politician from Texas
- Herbert J. Grover, American educator and politician
- James R. Grover Jr. (1919–2012), U.S. Republican politician
- Jim Grover (martial arts), instructor in World War II
- John Grover (disambiguation), various people, including

- John Grover (British Army officer) (1897–1979), British general
- John Grover (cricketer) (1915–1990), English cricketer
- John William Grover (1836–1892), civil engineer

- La Fayette Grover (1823–1911), U.S. politician
- Malcolm Henry Grover (1858–1945), British Indian Army general
- Martha Grover, American chemical engineer
- Montague Grover (1870–1943), Australian newspaper editor
- Ricky Grover (born 1961), British actor and comedian
- Ruth Dennis Grover (1912–2003), American painter and educator
- Thomas Grover (1807–1886), Mormon Pioneer
- William Grover-Williams (1903–1945), French/English car racer
