= Thakur Ram Singh =

Thakur Ram Singh

Thakur Ram Singh (16 February 1915 – 6 September 2010) was a veteran Rashtriya Swayamsevak Sangh (RSS) pracharak from Himachal Pradesh, India, and the inspiration behind the Akhil Bharatiya Itihas Sankalan Yojana. He headed the Itihas Sankalan Samiti (history compilation wing) of the RSS. He was given the responsibility of leading the Akhil Bharatiya Itihas Sankalan Yojana in 1988. He started this work under the guidance of veteran RSS pracharak Moropant Pingle, who had a major role in founding this project.

== Early life and education ==
Born on February 16, 1915, at Jhandavi village under Hamirpur district of Himachal Pradesh. Thakur Ramsingh became a swayamsevak in 1941 while doing MA (History) from FC College of Lahore. He topped the college in final year exams of MA in 1942 and was presented a gold medal for it. Keeping in view his extraordinary talent, the college principal had then offered him the lecturership in the same college. But he politely rejected the offer and became an RSS pracharak.

== Life as a pracharak ==
In 1942, a total of 58 workers had become pracharaks from Lahore alone. The then prant pracharak Shri Madhavrao Mule deputed Thakur Ramsingh in Kangra district. After two years, he was given the responsibility of vibhag pracharak of Amritsar in 1944. At that time Gurdaspur, Sialkot, Kangra, Chamba, Mandi, Suket and Bilaspur were also part of Amritsar Vibhag. Since the Prant Sangh Karyalaya of Punjab was shifted from Lahore to Jalandhar due to Partition in 1947, Thakur Ramsingh also shifted to Jalandhar. When Madhavrao Muleji was jailed in 1948 due to ban on RSS, the work of Punjab Zone was assigned to Shri Bhai Mahavir and Thakur Ramsingh was told to assist him. In 1949, Shri Bala Saheb Deoras called Ramsinghji to Calcutta. The planning was to expand the Sangh work in north-eastern states. Shri Ganga Bishan, Shri Baburao Paldhikar and Shri Agarkar were also called for the same meeting where M. S. Golwalkar gave the responsibility of Assam Prant to Ramsingh. He efficiently held this responsibility for 22 years from 1949 to 1971. After that he was appointed sahprant pracharak of Punjab. Later, he rose to become uttar kshetra pracharak also.

Thakur Ramsingh was given the responsibility of Akhil Bharatiya Itihas Sankalan Yojana in 1988. He started this work under the guidance of veteran pracharak Moropant Pingle who was basically the founder of this project. He was unanimously elected national president of Akhil Bharatiya Itihas Sankalan Yojana at the second national convention held at Warangal in Andhra Pradesh in 1992. It was a big challenge for him but he accepted the challenge and started the work from Delhi. All his activities in Akhil Bharatiya Itihas Sankalan Yojana were focused on knowing the real history of the country. He inspired many historians, scholars and senior workers for this objective and very shortly expanded the work in different parts of the country. He was successful in associating many scholars, historians and intellectual with the Yojana. He conducted four national seminars in Himachal Pradesh on human creation in Vaivastar Manvantar, social system, invasion of Sikandar on India and his killing by Dogra warriors in Jammu region, Maharaja Sansar Chand and on many other important topics. It is due to the inspiration of Thakur Ramsingh and the efforts of Akhil Bharatiya Itihas Sankalan Yojana that Thakur Jagdevchand Memorial Research Institute was formed at Neri in Hamirpur district. Ramsingh was its founder patron. Many important projects have already been started at this Institute.

Despite growing age and sickness, he remained active like a warrior throughout his life. Just one month back on August 5 he returned from Neri to Ludhiana and participated in a function organized to start a Rs 197 crore history writing project at the National Hamir Museum. Even being at the hospital in Ludhiana he called Shri Vijay Naddha on July 23 and gave him some handwritten facts about the Indian calendar for the Museum. At the later stage of his life, he was completely dedicated to the cause of history and discussed only about the project. Even at the time of being shifted to Ludhiana hospital from Hamirpur he was discussing about the project only.

== See also ==
- Akhil Bharatiya Itihas Sankalan Yojana
