= General Grover =

General Grover may refer to:

- Cuvier Grover (1828–1885), Union Army brigadier general and brevet major general
- John Grover (British Army officer) (1897–1979), British Army major general
- Malcolm Henry Grover (1858–1945), British Indian Army general
