= Growth of Muslim Population in Medieval India =

Book by K. S. Lal

Growth of Muslim Population in Medieval India (1000-1800)
- Author: K.S. Lal
- Genre: History
- Publication date: 1973

Growth of Muslim Population in Medieval India (1000-1800) is a book written by K. S. Lal published in 1973. The book attempts to assess the demographics of India between 1000 CE and 1500 CE.

Lal clarified he "claim no finality" regarding the estimates he provided in the book. He added that "any study of the population of the pre-census times can be based only on estimates, and estimates by their very nature tend to be tentative". He estimated that about 60 to 80 million people died in India between 1000 and 1525 as a result of the Islamic invasion of Indian subcontinent. He concluded that about 2 million people died during Mahmud of Ghazni's invasions of India alone.

The book's conclusions were disputed by several scholars. The book was praised by Koenraad Elst, and the Rashtriya Swayamsevak Sangh.

== Reviews and Criticisms ==
The book garnered mixed reviews. Stephen Neill, in his book A History of Christianity in India, regarded the book to contain "important sidelights". Professor Fritz Lehmann of University of British Columbia regarded the book as an "ambitious work" that contained a "mixture of half-truth and downright error."

Simon Digby disputed Lal's study of the demographic situation in medieval India in a 1975 review in Bulletin of the School of Oriental and African Studies. Digby argued that because the sources used by Lal were poor and because there were significant unknown variables, Lal's estimates were not credible. Digby compared Lal's book to other speculative work, concluding that such writing was an example of garbage in, garbage out.

Marxist historian Irfan Habib criticized the book in 1978 in The Indian Historical Review. He described Lal's starting population figure as "a figment of the imagination of one scholar resting on nothing more tangible than the imagination of another", and faulted Lal for unexplained or faulty assumptions in his other population estimates. K. S. Lal wrote a reply to Irfan Habib's criticism in 1979 in his book Bias in Indian Historiography (1979) and Theory and Practice of Muslim State in India (1999).

Koenraad Elst, a Hindutva sympathizer, referred to Lal's statistics in his book Negationism in India, remarking that "More research is needed before we can settle for a quantitatively accurate evaluation of Muslim rule in India, but at least we know for sure that the term crime against humanity is not exaggerated."

Roshni Sengupta writes that this book endeared K.S. Lal to the RSS, who used it to portray Muslims as "destructive barbarians, foreigners and immoral degenerates." Saeed Rid and Mohammad Hassan also write that the RSS regard the book's claims as a "gospel truth".

== See also ==
- Demographics of India
- Census of India
- Muslim population growth
