= 30th Indiana Infantry Regiment =

30th Regiment Indiana Infantry
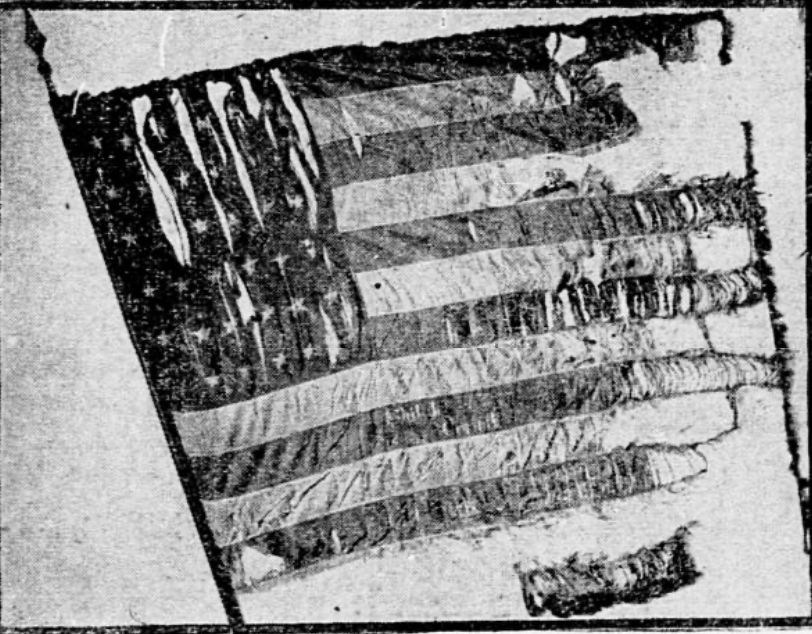
- National Flag
- Active: September 24, 1861 – November 25, 1865
- Country: United States
- Allegiance: Union
- Branch: Infantry
- Colors: National Flag
- Engagements: Battle of Shiloh; Siege of Corinth; Battle of Stones River; Tullahoma Campaign; Battle of Chickamauga; Atlanta campaign Battle of Resaca; Battle of Kennesaw Mountain; Siege of Atlanta; Battle of Jonesboro; Second Battle of Franklin; Battle of Nashville

The 30th Regiment Indiana Infantry was an infantry regiment that served in the Union Army during the American Civil War.

== Service ==
The 30th Indiana Infantry was organized at Fort Wayne, Indiana, and mustered in for a three-year enlistment on September 24, 1861, under the command of Colonel Sion S. Bass.

The regiment was attached to Wood's 2nd Brigade, McCook's Command, at Nolin, Kentucky, to November 1861. 5th Brigade, Army of the Ohio, to December 1861. 5th Brigade, 2nd Division, Army of the Ohio, to September 1862. 5th Brigade, 2nd Division, I Corps, Army of the Ohio, to November 1862. 2nd Brigade, 2nd Division, Right Wing, XIV Corps, Army of the Cumberland, to January 1863. 2nd Brigade, 2nd Division, XX Corps, Army of the Cumberland, to October 1863. 3rd Brigade, 1st Division, IV Corps, Army of the Cumberland, to June 1865. 2nd Brigade, 1st Division, IV Corps, to August 1865. Department of Texas to November 1865.

The 30th Indiana Infantry mustered out of service on November 25, 1865.

== Detailed service ==
Ordered to Camp Nevin, Kentucky, and reported to General Rousseau October 9. Camp at Nolin River, Kentucky, until February 1862. March to Bowling Green, Kentucky, then to Nashville, Tennessee, February 14-March 3. March to Savannah, Tennessee, March 16-April 6. Battle of Shiloh, April 6–7. Advance on and siege of Corinth, Mississippi, April 29-May 30. Pursuit to Booneville May 31-June 6. Buell's Campaign in northern Alabama and middle Tennessee June to August. March to Louisville, Kentucky, in pursuit of Bragg, August 21-September 26. Pursuit of Bragg into Kentucky October 1–22. Near Clay Village October 4. Battle of Perryville, October 8 (reserve). March to Nashville, Tennessee, October 22-November 7, and duty there until December 26. Reconnaissance toward Lavergne November 19. Reconnaissance to Lavergne November 26–27. Lavergne, Scrougesville November 27. Advance on Murfreesboro December 26–30. Battle of Stones River December 30–31, 1862 and January 1–3, 1863. Duty at Murfreesboro until June. Tullahoma Campaign June 23-July 7. Liberty Gap June 24–27. Occupation of middle Tennessee until August 16. Passage of the Cumberland Mountains and Tennessee River and Chickamauga Campaign August 16-September 22. Battle of Chickamauga September 19–20. Duty at Whiteside, Tyner's Station, and Blue Springs, Tennessee, until April 1864. Demonstration on Dalton, Georgia, February 22–27, 1864. Near Dalton February 23. Tunnel Hill, Buzzard's Roost Gap and Rocky Faced Ridge February 23–25. Atlanta Campaign May 1-September 3. Tunnel Hill May 6–7. Demonstrations on Rocky Faced Ridge and Dalton May 8–13. Buzzard's Roost Gap May 8–9. Battle of Resaca May 14–15. Near Kingston May 18–19. Near Cassville May 19. Advance on Dallas May 22–25. Operations on line of Pumpkin Vine Creek and battles about Dallas, New Hope Church, and Allatoona Hills May 25-June 5. Operations about Marietta and against Kennesaw Mountain June 10-July 2. Pine Hill June 11–14. Lost Mountain June 15–17. Assault on Kennesaw June 27. Ruff's Station, Smyrna Camp Ground, July 4. Chattahoochee River July 5–17. Peachtree Creek July 19–20. Siege of Atlanta July 22-August 25. Flank movement on Jonesboro August 25–30. Battle of Jonesboro August 31-September 1. Lovejoy's Station September 2–6. Operations against Hood in northern Georgia and northern Alabama September 20-November 3. Consolidated to a battalion of 7 companies October 3. Nashville Campaign November–December. Columbia, Duck River, November 24–27. Battle of Franklin November 30. Battle of Nashville December 15–16. Pursuit of Hood to the Tennessee River December 17–28. Moved to Huntsville, Alabama, and duty there until March 1865. Operations in eastern Tennessee March 15-April 22. Duty at Nashville until June. Moved to New Orleans, Louisiana, June 16, then to Texas in July, and duty at various points until November.

== Casualties ==
The regiment lost a total of 412 men during service; 4 officers and 133 enlisted men killed or mortally wounded, 1 officer and 274 enlisted men died of disease.

== Commanders ==
- Colonel Sion S. Bass
- Colonel Joseph B. Dodge - commanded at the battle of Stones River
- Lieutenant Colonel Orrin D. Hurd - commanded at the battles of Stones River and Chickamauga
- Captain Henry Ware Lawton - commanded at the battle of Nashville
- Captain Oliver McMahan - commanded at the Battle of Shiloh

== Notable members ==
- Captain Henry Ware Lawton, Company A - Medal of Honor recipient for action during the siege of Atlanta; rose to the rank of major general and killed in the Philippine–American War
- Corporal William Augustine Ogden, Company C - composer

== See also ==
- List of Indiana Civil War regiments
- Indiana in the Civil War
