= K. S. Lal =

Indian historian (1920–2002)

- Born: Kishori Saran Lal; 1920
- Died: 2002 (aged 81–82)
- Education: University of Allahabad
- Occupations: Historian, Academic
- Known for: Authoring books about Indian history

Kishori Saran Lal (1920–2002), better known as K. S. Lal, was an Indian Hindu nationalist historian. He is the author of several works, mainly on the medieval history of India.

== Career ==
He obtained his master's degree in 1941 at the University of Allahabad. In 1945 he obtained his D.Phil. with a dissertation on the history of the Khaljis. This dissertation formed the basis for his book History of the Khaljis. He started his career as a Lecturer of History in the Allahabad University, though he served in this position only for a brief period.

From 1945 to 1963 he was with Madhya Pradesh Educational Service and taught at the Government Colleges at Nagpur, Jabalpur, and Bhopal. In 1963, he joined University of Delhi as a reader and taught Medieval Indian history in its History Department.

For the next ten years, starting 1973, he was the Professor and Head of the Department of History, first at the University of Jodhpur (1973–79), and then at the Central University of Hyderabad (1979–83).

Besides his mother tongue Hindi, he was also fluent in Persian, Old Persian and Urdu.

In 2001 he was appointed chairman of the Indian Council for Historical Research (ICHR) and also placed on the National Council of Educational Research and Training (NCERT) Committee to draft the model school syllabus on Indian history.

== List of works ==
- History of the Khaljis (1950, 1967, 1980)
- Twilight of the Sultanate (1963, 1980)
- Studies in Asian History (edited – 1969)
- Growth of Muslim Population in Medieval India (1973)
- Early Muslims in India (1984)
- The Mughal Harem (1988) ISBN 81-85179-03-4 is study on the history and nature of the Mughal Harem of medieval India. K.S. Lal writes about many obscure topics like the role of the Eunuchs and drugs like opium in the Mughal Harem.
- Indian Muslims: Who are they (1990) ISBN 81-85990-10-7
- The Legacy of Muslim Rule in India is a book published in 1993. (Aditya Prakashan, ISBN 81-85689-03-2).
- Muslim Slave System in Medieval India (1994) ISBN 81-85689-67-9
- Historical essays
- Theory and Practice of Muslim State in India (1999) ISBN 81-86471-72-3
- Growth of Scheduled Tribes and Castes in Medieval India (1995)

== Reception ==
Lal's early books were uncontroversial, and some of his books, such as History of the Khaljis and Twilight of the Sultanate, have been called "standard works." Some of his later works were controversial, including allegation of being a spokesman for the RSS. Lal himself noted: "As usual [my books] have been reviewed in journals in India and abroad, bestowing both praise and blame as per the custom of the reviewers. However, during the last fifteen years or so, some of my books have received special attention of a certain brand of scholars for adverse criticism." The controversy surrounding these events is reflected in the theme of the discourses of his books which allegedly describe Muslims as foreigners, destructive barbarians and immoral degenerates, Lal himself disputes these allegations, citing, in turn, that the ICHR has always been dominated by historians with a 'strong leftist bias' and that the current controversy is "merely the outcome of an exaggerated sense of pique on the part of the excluded Left wing".

Avril A. Powell praised Lal's works on Indian history in the 1950s and 60s, but concluded that by 1990s Lal's work represented "political agendas".

Historian Jeremy Black in his book Contesting History: Narratives of Public History (2014), referenced his book The Muslim Slave System in Medieval India as a "good modern work"; he also comments that K. S. Lal " is regarded as right-wing by Indian Muslim Marxist scholars".

Irfan Habib in a dispute over positions at Indian Council of Historical Research remarks: "K.S. Lal may have written a worthwhile work of history in the distant past, but his more recent works - which have focussed almost exclusively on the supposed historical injuries suffered by Hindus - have been tendentious, communal and deeply objectionable."

=== Growth of Muslim Population in Medieval India ===
The 1973 book Growth of Muslim Population in Medieval India estimated the demographics of India between 1000 CE and 1500 CE. Lal had clarified he "claim no finality" regarding the estimates he provided in the book. He added that "any study of the population of the pre-census times can be based only on estimates, and estimates by their very nature tend to be tentative".

The book gained mixed reviews. Simon Digby disputed Lal's study of the demographic situation in medieval India in a review in Bulletin of the School of Oriental and African Studies, Digby stated that estimate lacks accurate data in pre-census times. Indian historian Irfan Habib criticized the book in 1978 in The Indian Historical Review. He described Lal's starting population figure as "a figment of the imagination of one scholar resting on nothing more tangible than the imagination of another", and faulted Lal for unexplained or faulty assumptions in his other population estimates. K. S. Lal wrote a reply to Irfan Habib's criticism in 1979 in his book Bias in Indian Historiography (1979) and Theory and Practice of Muslim State in India (1999).

=== The Legacy of Muslim Rule in India ===
The 1993 book The Legacy of Muslim Rule in India attempted to assess the legacy of Muslim rule in India and describes its history. The book was criticized by Peter Jackson in the Journal of the Royal Asiatic Society, stating that book contains "a markedly selective and one-sided account of India's Muslim past". K. S. Lal wrote a rebuttal to Jackson's criticism in his book Theory and Practice of Muslim State in India. Lal wrote, "I would like to say that most history is selective. Selective study is common everywhere, in Aligarh, in Jackson's review itself." And he went on to give many examples of it.

Avril A. Powell of University of London said the book was "propaganda" that was especially dangerous as it was written by a historian as esteemed as Lal.

== See also ==
- Jadunath Sarkar
- Vincent Arthur Smith
- M. Athar Ali
- Muzaffar Alam
- Sanjay Subrahmanyam
