= Yellapragada =

Yellapragada (Telugu: యల్లాప్రగడ) or Yallapragada is a Telugu surname. Notable people with the surname include:

- Svetha Yallapragada Rao (born 1986), American singer known professionally as Raja Kumari
- Yellapragada Subbarow (1895–1948), Indian-American biochemist
- Yellapragada Sudershan Rao (born 1945), Indian historian
