= John Grover =

John Grover may refer to:

- John William Grover (1836–1892), English civil engineer
- John Grover (British Army officer) (1897–1979), British army general
- John Grover (cricketer) (1915–1990), English cricketer
- John Grover (film editor) (1938–2026), British film editor
- John Fredrick Orrin Grover (1923–1994) Flying Tiger Pilot mentioned in Flying Aces book
