= Indian Council of Historical Research =

Indian historical body

The Indian Council of Historical Research (ICHR) is an autonomous body of the Ministry of Education, Government of India established by an Administrative Order. The body has provided financial assistance to historians and scholars through fellowships, grants, and symposia.

The ICHR receives grants-in-aid from the Department of Higher Education, grants-in-aid from various Indian states, private donations, and the proceeds of revenues from the sale of publications of the ICHR. The ICHR is based in Delhi, with regional centres in Pune (Maharashtra), Bengaluru (Karnataka), and Guwahati (Assam).

It was established on 27 March 1972.

Its first chairman was the historian Ram Sharan Sharma. Historians who have served as members or functionaries of the ICHR include Irfan Habib, Tapan Raychaudhuri, and Barun De.

== Objectives ==
The objectives of the ICHR, as enunciated in the initial pamphlet published by the Department of Education, Government of India in 1972, are as under:

- to bring historians together and provide a forum for the exchange of views between them;
- to give a national direction to objective and scientific writing of history and to have rational presentation and interpretation of history;
- to promote, accelerate and coordinate research in history with special emphasis on areas that have not received adequate attention so far;
- to promote and coordinate a balanced distribution of research effort over different areas; and
- to elicit support and recognition for historical research from all concerned and ensure the necessary dissemination and use of results.

== Funding, expenses and salaries ==
ICHR is funded by grants-in-aid received from the Department of Higher Education, Ministry of Education . It also receives funds from the various state governments of India and from other Ministries of the government of India.

== Organization ==
The ICHR is headed by an Honorary Chairman. The Member Secretary functions as the Secretary of the Governing Council during its General Body and special meetings and as the day-to-day Head of the Department in ICHR.

The Members of the Council of ICHR (Governing Body) are nominated for a period of three years. The Chairman of the Council of ICHR is nominated by the Department of Education in an honorary capacity and his term is not co-terminus with that of the members of the Constituted Council. The day-to-day functioning of the ICHR is looked after by the Director who acts as ex officio Member Secretary of the Council. In 1991, a trend was started to have a separate post of Member Secretary of the ICHR, with Professor MGS Narayanan being selected as the First Member Secretary of ICHR. The institution has been continually embroiled in intra-rivalries between the Chairmen, Member Secretaries, and the Directors, at the cost of historical research. The main reason, as per many, has been the deputing of persons from here and there as the Member Secretaries and the undermining the office of the Chairman and the Director of the institution.

=== Chairmen ===
- R.S. Sharma, 1972 - 1977
- A.R. Kulkarni, 1978 - 1981
- Niharranjan Ray, 1981 - 1981
- Lokesh Chandra, 1982 - 1985
- Irfan Habib, 1986 - 1993
- Ravinder Kumar, 1993 - 1996
- S. Settar, 1996 - 1999
- K.S. Sarma (acting), 1999 - 1999
- B.R. Grover, 1999 - 2001
- K.S. Lal, 2001 - 2001
- M.G.S. Narayanan, 2001 - 2003
- Kumud Bansal (acting), 2003 - 2004
- D.N. Tripathi, 2004 - 2007
- K.M. Acharya (acting), 2007 - 2007
- Sabyasachi Bhattacharya, 4 March 2007 – 3 March 2010
- Sabyasachi Bhattacharya (acting), 4 April 2010 – 20 May 2011
- Basudev Chatterjee, 20 May 2011 - 2014
- Yellapragada Sudershan Rao, 28 June 2014 - 26 June 2017
- A.P Jamkhedkar, 15 February 2018 – 14 January 2022
- Raghuvendra Tanwar, 14 January 2022 - present

=== Member Secretary ===
Dr Manoj Sharma

=== Directors ===
- B.R. Grover (1975–1986)
- T.R. Sareen (1986–1997)
- Sushil Kumar (1997–2010)

== Composition of the Council ==
After its reconstitution in 2019, the ICHR Council consists of the following members for a period of three years:

- An eminent historian nominated by the Government of India who shall be Chairman of the Council
- Eighteen historians nominated by the Government of India;
- Representative of the University Grants Commission (UGC)
- Director General of the Archaeological Survey of India
- Director General of the National Archives of India
- Four persons to represent government who shall be nominated by the Government of India and which shall include one representative each of the Ministry of Education, the Department of Culture and the Ministry of Finance, and the Member Secretary, who is appointed by the Council of the ICHR on a deputation basis for a period of three years, with the approval of the Ministry of Human Resource Development, Government of India.

== Publications ==
The ICHR publishes online as well as on print media. It publishes two journals: the Indian Historical Review (bi-annually) and Itihas (in Hindi). It also provides publication subsidies to seminars, books, congress proceedings, and journals. The editing and publication has been outsourced to certain publishing houses.
