= Emma Pitt =

American writer and composer (1846–1919)

Emma Pitt (1846 - 14 March 1919) was an American author and composer who wrote over 200 texts for hymns, as well as music for many of them. She also wrote popular songs.

Pitt was born in Maryland and lived much of her life in Baltimore. She studied music with Anthony J. Showalter. She married William Pitt and they had four children.

Pitt collaborated with William Ogden and Professor Harry Porter. She self-published at least one piece, “Gospel Light”. Her works were also published by Oliver Ditson and Thompson & Odell. In addition to at least 233 hymn texts, her publications include:

== Vocal ==
- “Buds and Blossoms”
- Fresh Flowers (collection)
- “Gospel Light”
- “In His Name”
- Infant Songs (with William Ogden)
- “Oh! He’s the Lad for Me”
- “Our Royal Prince”
- “Sunshine Every Day” (text by Emma Pitt; music by William Ogden)
- When Angels Have Lifted the Veil (for four voices; text by Pemberton Pierce; music by Emma Pitt)
