= Battle of Santa Cruz (1899) =

Military engagement

- Part of Philippine–American War
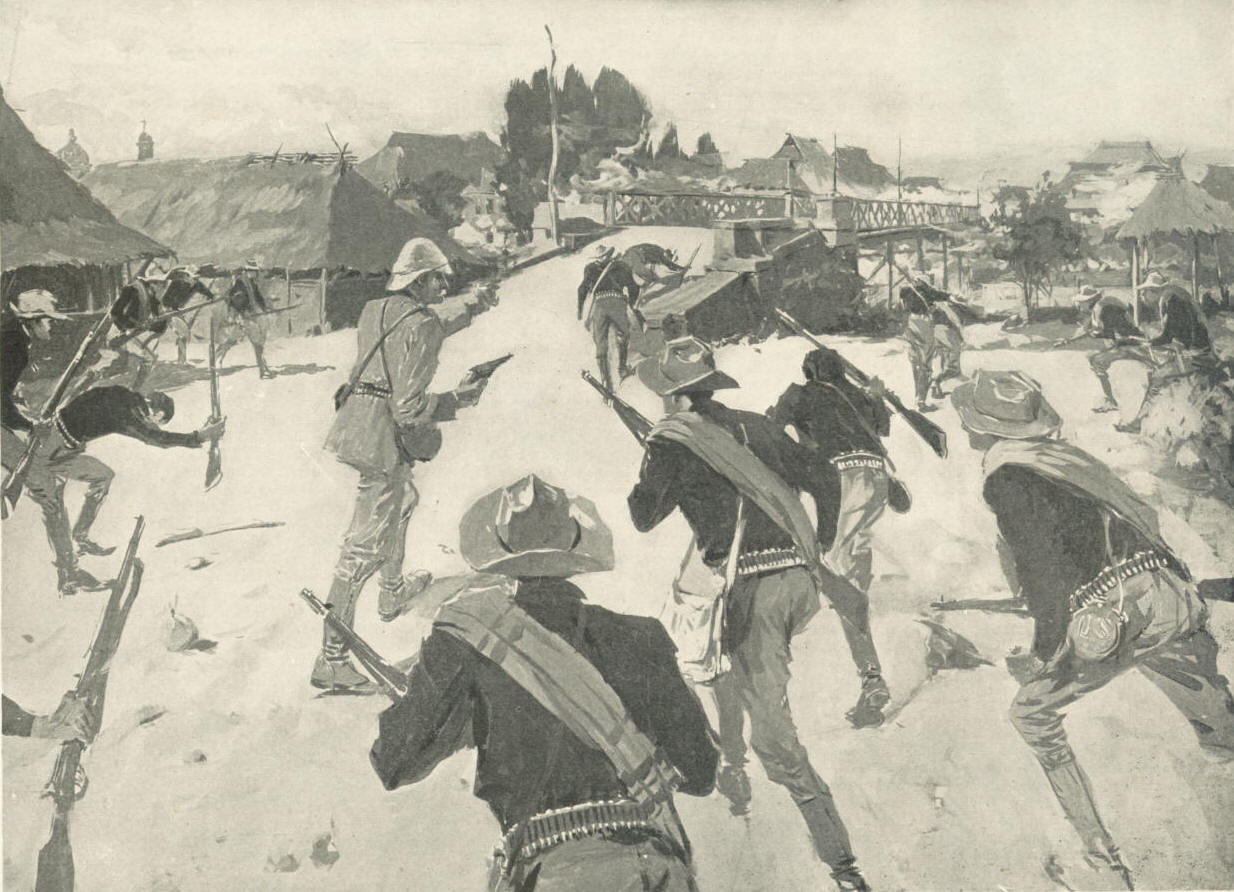
- General Henry W. Lawton leading American forces at the Battle of Santa Cruz during the Laguna de Bay Campaign
Date	April 9–10, 1899
Location	Santa Cruz, Laguna
Result	American victory

Belligerents
United States	First Philippine Republic

Commanders and leaders
Henry W. Lawton; Charles King	Juan Cailles

Strength
Provisional Brigade	Unknown

Casualties and losses
1 killed 9 wounded	93 killed 40 wounded

This Battle of Santa Cruz was fought in the early stages of the Philippine–American War during General Henry W. Lawton's Laguna de Bay campaign.

== Background ==
After defeating the Filipino nationalists at the second battle of Manila, General Elwell S. Otis, commander of the US VIII Corps, sent the 1st Division under Arthur MacArthur to the north to threaten the Filipino capitol at Malolos. At the same time, the 2nd Division under Henry W. Lawton was sent south into the Laguna province, to the Filipino stronghold located in the town of Santa Cruz.

== Landings ==
On April 8, 1899, Lawton's division boarded a small fleet of cascos escorted by the gunboats Laguna de Bay, Oeste and Napindan, on the Pasig River east of Manila and sailed towards Laguna de Bay. The flotilla did not reach the opposite shore of the lake until early afternoon the next day, because the pilots were unfamiliar with the river and frequently grounded the boats. At 10:30 a.m. on April 9, landing craft began offloading Lawton's troops south of the stronghold of Santa Cruz. Ashore in the afternoon of April 9, the troops set out for Santa Cruz in a long skirmish line, advancing through driving rain. At 5:45 p.m., the right flank, consisting of the 1st Idaho and 14th Infantry, encountered a defense complex of entrenchments and bamboo obstructions, through which they advanced slowly against resistance, until darkness fell, when the troops camped in the fields.

== Advance on Santa Cruz ==
Early on April 10, Lawton personally went ashore with the 4th Cavalry north of town. They advanced along the main road leading into the town. Early on, Lawton ordered the telegraph lines be cut, severing the Filipinos' communication with Emilio Aguinaldo up north. The Americans met light resistance from the Filipinos until their approach to a bridge outside of town, which was heavily guarded by Filipinos under the command of General Juan Cailles. The 14th US Regular Infantry Regiment, 1st Idaho, and 1st Washington volunteers charged the bridge and managed to rout the Filipinos.

At the same time, dismounted Troops C and L of the 4th US Cavalry Regiment began to land under fire on a beach just north of town. The 4th Cavalry was supported by fire from Laguna de Bay, Oeste, and Napindan and managed to secure a foothold on the beach. That same day, Lawton took control of Santa Cruz as Cailles and his units withdrew to Pagsanjan.

While Gen. Lawton consolidated his forces in Santa Cruz, he planned to push on to Pagsanjan where he figured the Filipinos had retreated. After capturing Pagsanjan on April 11, he again defeated the Filipinos in a stiff engagement at the Battle of Paete.

== Withdrawal ==
On April 16, Lawton's forces reboarded their transport ships to return to Manila, noticing enemy soldiers entering the town as they left.

== Results and aftermath ==
Overall, the results of the Santa Cruz expedition amounted to the capture of six launches and the deaths of some 125 Filipino soldiers.Linn 2000, p. 103 After the expedition, Aguinaldo ordered forces at Cavite, Batangas, and Laguna to concentrate at Muntinlupa, tying up manpower south of Manila which might otherwise have gone north. The expedition demonstrated that towns on Laguna de Bay were vulnerable to raiders, forcing local officials to keep their military forces close to home in case of defensive need.
