= Martha Grover =

American chemical engineer

Martha Anne Grover
- Born: Martha Anne Grover
- Other name: Martha Anne Gallivan
- Education: California Institute of Technology; University of Illinois at Urbana–Champaign
- Scientific career
- Workplaces: Georgia Tech
- Thesis: Modeling and control of epitaxial thin film growth (2003)
- Website: Grover Group

Martha Anne Grover is an American chemical engineer who is a professor and chair of graduate studies at the Georgia Tech School of Chemical and Biomolecular Engineering. Her research considers molecular self assembly and the emergence of biological functions.

== Early life and education ==
Grover earned her undergraduate degree at the University of Illinois at Urbana–Champaign. During her undergraduate degree, she spent a year at the Armstrong Flight Research Center. She moved to the California Institute of Technology for her graduate studies, where she completed a master's degree and doctorate. Her doctoral research considered the simulation of thin film growth through the Monte Carlo method. Her simulations was able to recreate the nucleation and growth of atomic clusters, as well as explain the propagation of atomic layers.

== Research and career ==
In 2002 Grover joined Georgia Tech as an assistant professor. Her research considers the origins of life and structure-property relationships in carbon-based systems. She is interested in the kinetics of molecular self-assembly and how these are impacted by external stimuli. This work has wide-reaching applications, from the design of intelligent materials to the control of morphology in polymer-based photovoltaics. Grover has worked with Jennifer Glass on astrobiology.

Grover was the first woman to win the American Institute of Chemical Engineers (AIChE) David Himmelblau Award for Innovations in Computer-Based Chemical Engineering Education in 2018.

In 2020, Grover was named an National Science Foundation Organizational Change for Gender Equity in STEM Academic Professions (ADVANCE) Professor. In this capacity she serves to advocate for gender and racial equality.

== Awards and honors ==
- 2004 National Science Foundation CAREER Award
- 2011 AIChE Outstanding Young Researcher
- 2019 AIChE Himmelblau Award for Innovations in Computer-Based Chemical Engineering Education

== Selected publications ==
- Jay G Forsythe; Martha A Grover; Irena Mamajanov; Ramanarayanan Krishnamurthy; Facundo M Fernandez; Nicholas V Hud (15 July 2015). "Ester-Mediated Amide Bond Formation Driven by Wet-Dry Cycles: A Possible Path to Polypeptides on the Prebiotic Earth". Angewandte Chemie International Edition. 54 (34): 9871–9875. doi:10.1002/anie.201503792. ISSN 1433-7851. PMC 4678426. PMID 26201989. Wikidata Q36369938.
- Gang Wang; Nils Persson; Ping-Hsun Chu; et al. (16 July 2015). "Microfluidic Crystal Engineering of π-Conjugated Polymers". ACS Nano. 9 (8): 8220–8230. doi:10.1021/acsnano.5b02582. ISSN 1936-0851. PMID 26182171. Wikidata Q50954047.
- Chad R Bernier; Anton S Petrov; Chris C Waterbury; et al. (28 May 2014). "RiboVision suite for visualization and analysis of ribosomes". Faraday Discussions. 169: 195–207. doi:10.1039/c3fd00126a. ISSN 1359-6640. PMID 25340471. Wikidata Q35361143.
