= A. D. Grover =

American banjoist and inventor (1865–1927)

Albert Deane Grover (February 18, 1865 Boston, Massachusetts – October 23, 1927 Manhattan, New York) was an American banjoist, composer, teacher, and prolific inventor of musical parts and accessories for stringed instruments. He was a founding member of the Boston Ideal Banjo, Mandolin and Guitar Club. Grover held over 50 patents for musical instrument parts, and founded the musical accessories company A. D. Grover & Son. His father, Stephen Grover (1820–1885), was a Boston piano maker.

In 1952, Grover Musical Products, Inc., of Cleveland, Ohio, succeeded A.D. Grover & Son.

== Selected compositions ==
- Magog Quickstep, composed by Grover, Boston: Thompson & Odell (1887) OCLC 671714696
- Marguerite Waltz, composed by Grover, Boston: Thompson & Odell (1889) OCLC 671715101

== Other publications ==
- Grover's Progressive Method for the Banjo, Boston: Thompson & Odell Company (1892) OCLC 635451928

== See also ==
- Machine head
