= Akhil Bharatiya Itihas Sankalan Yojana =

Hindutva pseudohistorical organisation

The Akhil Bharatiya Itihas Sankalan Yojana (ABISY) is a subsidiary of the Rashtriya Swayamsevak Sangh (RSS), a right-wing Hindutva paramilitary organisation. Envisioned in 1973 by Moropant Pingley, a pracharak of the RSS, and founded in 1978-79, the ABISY states that India's history was distorted by the British Raj and that it seeks to correct the alleged biases. In reality, the actual aim of the organisation is to rewrite Indian history from the perspective of Hindutva, a Hindu nationalist ideology.

== History ==
The Akhil Bharatiya Itihas Sankalan Yojana (ABISY) is a subsidiary of the Rashtriya Swayamsevak Sangh (RSS), founded in 1978-79. It was envisioned in 1973 by Moropant Pingley, a pracharak of the RSS. The organisation was further developed by Balmukund Pandey, who would later become its Organising Secretary. According to social anthropologist Daniela Beti, the main leaders of the organisation have an ideology aligned with Hindutva ideology, although the members of the organisation may have their own reasons for participating.

In July 2014, Yellapragada Sudershan Rao, the head of the Andhra Pradesh chapter of ABISY, who did not have any peer-reviewed publications, was appointed Chairperson of the Indian Council of Historical Research (ICHR) by the National Democratic Alliance government headed by Narendra Modi. In March 2015, three other ABISY-affiliated historians were nominated as members to the Council: Narayan Rao, former professor at Berhampur University and the national Vice-President of ABISY, Ishwar Sharan Vishwakarma, Professor in the Department of Ancient History, Archaeology and Culture at Gorakhpur University and the All-India General Secretary of ABISY, and Nikhilesh Guha, a retired Professor of Kalyani University and the head of the Bengal chapter of ABISY. The appointments were described by commentators as an effort by the Modi administration to fill government institutions with individuals ideologically aligned with the RSS.

== Ideology ==
The stated objective of the ABISY is writing Indian history "from a national perspective". The name ABISY means "The Plan (also in the sense of committee) for collecting History of the Whole of India". Scholars have described the organisation as engaging in historical revisionism to present a narrative consistent with the ideology of Hindutva. Pandey states that Indian historians have been exposed to western distortions, which created a false impression of Indian cultural diversity. According to Pandey, the puranas were the most significant source of Indian history. The organisation states that beneath the diversity of India's culture is a unifying Hindu culture. It regards the Vedic culture to have originated in the Janjati and Adivasis traditions, the local Indian cultures.

The ABISY believes that the Indo-Aryans did not migrate to the Indian subcontinent from Central Asia, but were the original inhabitants of India, some of whom later left the subcontinent and civilised other parts of the world. This theory is rejected by mainstream scholars, as it contradicts a wide range of scientific research. This belief is also used to argue that upper-caste Hindus and Adivasis share a common stock, but that only the caste-Hindu lineages were advanced enough to expand out of the subcontinent. Scholars have described this ideology as an effort to justify discrimination against Adivasi peoples.

== Activities ==
=== Projects ===
In August 2014, the organisation stated that it had completed four research projects, namely retracing the journey of the Saraswati river, countering the theory that Aryans migrated into India and instead claiming that Aryans were originally from India who had migrate out of India, dating the Mahabharatha, Shankaracharya and Buddha, and emphasising that the 1857 rebellion was the First War of Independence. It announced that its next ten-year project would be to compile all Hindu Puranas into an encyclopedia, get scholars to interpret its original meaning, and to put it forward as India's real history. The ABISY has also stated that it intends to document the history of all the 670+ districts in India, and describe the history of the more than 600 tribal communities in India.

=== Methodology ===
The ABISY centers its historical work around Hindu scriptures. Berti states that ABISY methodology, as exemplified in its interpretation of Kullu mythology, is to collect orally preserved stories of the gods, or bharthā, which are to be regarded as reliable sources for an understanding of those gods. ABISY leaders "decipher" those texts, or often just snippets of them, to reveal their similarity with Sanskrit texts, by focusing on specific words or expressions. This would reveal the Sanskrit identity of the village gods. ABISY tries to show a link between local cultures and a supposed unified Hindu culture by investigating those local cultures. Berti notes that this kind of "new local historiography" is not unique to Hindutva-writers, but has also appeared in African nationalistic discourse, and that "the political construction and utilisation of folklore was at the very heart of the XIX century’s European nationalisms."

=== Publications ===
The ABISY publishes the journal Itihas Darpan (Mirror of History), edited in Delhi. A majority of the articles are written in English, while a few are in Hindi. It has been intermittently published since 1995; since 2016, Indian Council of Historical Research has taken over the reins. Few authors had any institutional affiliation or even academic training in history. The editorial standards of the journal emphasise the urgency of "scientific character" in Indian historical research, with repeated references to "the importance of making reference to sources". Nonetheless, citations are often vague and they seldom refer to any recent work in academic history.

Not all local history is deemed worth researching, but only those facts which are in accordance with the organisation's ideology. Tanika Sarkar notes the production to be a Brahmanical scape: both the editors were upper caste Hindus with no background in history, pages were affixed with Hindu imagery, and the primary focus remained on instilling a pride among readers about ancient India via idiosyncratic reading of Sanskrit texts. Histories of medieval and modern India are never delved into. In the April 2016 issue, one article derived all modern science from the Vedas while one prescribed Manusmriti as the panacea for all evils plaguing India while yet another eulogised the unique traditions of Hindu tolerance.

== Organisation ==
ABISY headquarters are located at Keshav Kunj, the Delhi office of the RSS. Under the central office are thirteen ksetra, or provincial, offices, each run by a president. These centres are responsible for connecting ABISY ideology to local cultural lore and tradition. Branches of ABISY exist in Chandigarh, Shimla and Kullu. ABISY states that it has 500 professors associated with it.

== Sources ==
- Berti, Daniela (2006). "The Memory of Gods: From a Secret Autobiography to a Nationalistic Project". Indian Folklife (24).
- Berti, Daniela (2007). "Hindu nationalists and local History: From ideology to local lore". Rivista di Studi Sudasiatici. 2: 5–36. Archived from the original on 15 April 2016.
- Bryant, Edwin (2001). The Quest for the Origins of Vedic Culture: The Indo-Aryan Migration Debate. Oxford University Press. ISBN 9780195137774.
- Chatterji, Angana P.; Hansen, Thomas Blom; Jaffrelot, Christophe (August 2019). Majoritarian State: How Hindu Nationalism Is Changing India. Oxford University Press. ISBN 9780190078171.
- Trautmann, Thomas (2005). The Aryan Debate. Oxford University Press. ISBN 9780195669084.
