= Boston Ideal Banjo, Mandolin and Guitar Club =

The Boston Ideal Banjo, Mandolin and Guitar Club was an American musical quintet composed of virtuoso artists of the banjo, mandolin, and guitar. Founded in 1887, it was reputed to be the first ensemble of fretted instrument artists on the East Coast formed for professional appearances and nationwide concert tours. The prevailing critical acclaim in major cities throughout the country was highly complimentary.

== Founding members ==
1. Albert Deane Grover (1865–1927) "trick banjo soloist", manager
2. H. W. Harris on mandolin, guitar
3. Bert Eldon Shattuck (born 1856) banjo
4. George L. Lansing (born approx 1855), banjo, composer
5. L. H. Galeucia. guitar and banjo

Shattuck was the inaugural editor of Gatcomb's Banjo & Guitar Gazette launched in 1887 by the L. B. Gatcomb Company of Boston. Galeucia was the next editor.

In 1891, Harris left the group because he had tuberculosis. he was replaced by A. C. Robinson, who played mandolin and guitar.
