= Rajesh Kumar Grover =

Indian oncologist

- Born: India
- Occupation: Oncologist
- Awards: Padma Shri

Rajesh Kumar Grover is an Indian oncologist and former director and chief executive officer of Delhi State Cancer Institute, New Delhi. The Government of India honoured him, in 2014, with the award of Padma Shri, the fourth highest civilian award, for his contributions to the field of medicine.

Dr Grover has over 50 scientific papers to his credit and has attended over 100 conferences and workshops in India and abroad. Research Gate has published ten of his articles in their online repository.
