= Nicholas Hud =

American scientist

Nicholas V. Hud
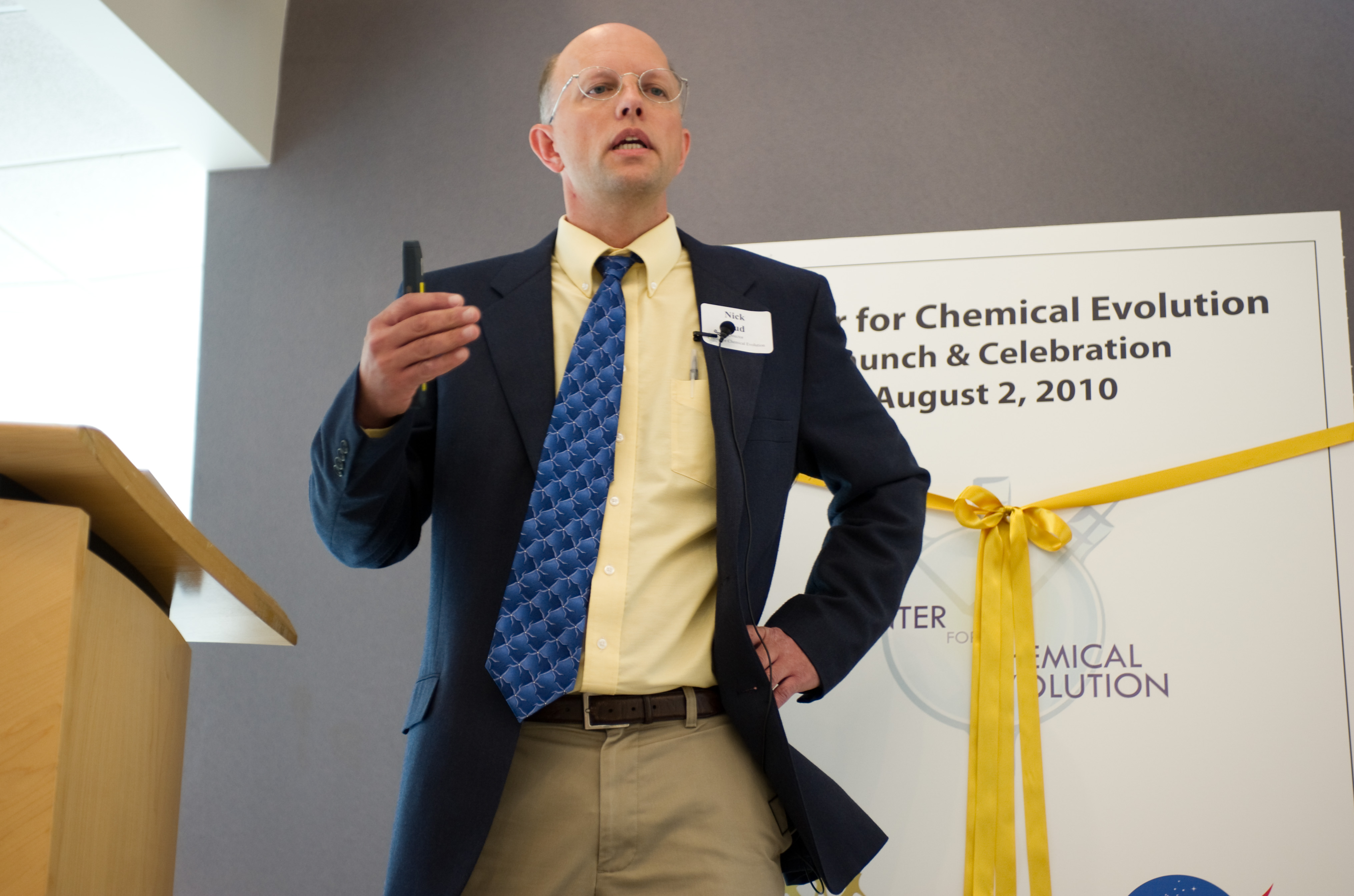
- Born: Los Angeles, California
- Education: Loyola Marymount University, UC-Davis
- Scientific career
- Workplaces: Georgia Tech
- Doctoral advisors: Rod Balhorn
- Website: https://ww2.chemistry.gatech.edu/hud/

Nicholas V. Hud is a biophysicist, biochemist, origins of life researcher, and Regents’ Professor and Julius Brown Professor of Chemistry and Biochemistry at the Georgia Institute of Technology in Atlanta, Georgia.

== Early life and education ==
Hud was born in Los Angeles, California. He received his B.S. degree from Loyola Marymount University. His Ph.D. was conferred by the University of California, Davis under the mentorship of Professor Rod Balhorn. He was a postdoctoral fellow in the Biology and Biotechnology Research Program at Lawrence Livermore National Laboratory. He was an NIH postdoctoral fellow in biophysics at UCLA with Professors Juli Feigon and Frank Anet.

== Career ==
Hud joined the faculty of the school of chemistry and biochemistry at Georgia Tech in 1999 and was named Regents' Professor in 2016 and Julius Brown Professor in 2021. He served as director of the NSF/NASA Center for Chemical Evolution, from 2010-2021. He currently serves as associate director of the Parker H. Petit Institute of Bioengineering and Bioscience (IBB). Prof. Hud was elected Fellow of the American Association for the Advancement of Science in 2019, Fellow of the International Society for the Study of the Origin of Life in 2014, and was a Sigma Xi Distinguished Lecturer 2015-2017.

=== Research ===
Hud uses various experimental techniques to elucidate the structures and physical properties of DNA and RNA polymers, including investigations of how these molecules are packaged within living cells and viruses. Much of his current research focuses on the origins of life
