= Arjun Dass Grover =

Indian ophthalmologist

- Born: 1 March 1928
- Died: 7 October 1987 (aged 59); Chandigarh
- Education: King George Medical College (M.B.B.S., M.S.)
- Occupation: Ophthalmologist
- Spouse: Pushpa Miglani

Arjun Dass Grover (1928–1987) was an Indian ophthalmologist.

== Personal life ==
Grover was born on 1 March 1928 in Mianwali (West Punjab) to Shri Bhoga Ram and Piari Bai. His primary education was in Okara. Later he went to Lahore and joined D.A.V. College and passed his F.Sc. He was admitted to Balak Ram Medical College but after the partition in 1947, he continued his medical education in King George Medical College, Lucknow. He passed his M.B.B.S. with honors in 1951 and M.S. in ophthalmology in 1955 from the same college. He married Pushpa Miglani in 1954. He settled in Chandigarh in 1960 and died on 7 October 1987.

== Professional life ==
After a short stint in Jaunpur at the Sitapur Eye Hospital, he joined the Gandhi Eye Hospital in Aligarh as an assistant professor in charge of the research wing from 1956 to 1960. He carried out extensive research on trachoma. His work on molluscum contagiosum was acknowledged in the ophthalmology book series of Sir Stewart Duke Elder. He helped set up the eye department at P.G.I. Chandigarh in 1960. In 1962, he resigned from P.G.I. and started the first private eye hospital in Chandigarh.

=== Key positions ===
- Founder Chandigarh Ophthalmological Society (1985)
- President of Indian Medical Association, Chandigarh State Branch 1981–82
- Medical Director and Chairman - Grover Eye Laser & ENT Hospital

== Philanthropy ==
He participated in the first eye operation camp held by the Lions Club in Chandigarh. Later his social work extended to the tribal areas near Ranchi (Chhota Nagpur, Lohardaga and Khunti) where in 1983 the tribal people learned that cataracts were curable. Dayanand Anglo-Vedic Schools carried on his work and established a hospital in his memory.

== Dedications ==
- The lecture hall in the Indian Medical Association building, Chandigarh is named after him.
- An oration was instituted in his memory.
