= Yellapragada Sudershan Rao =

Indian historian

Yellapragada Sudershan Rao is an Indian historian, who was appointed the chairperson of the Indian Council of Historical Research (ICHR) by the Government of India, serving from July 2014 to July 2017. He was formerly a professor of history at Kakatiya University in Telangana, and had previously served as a member of the ICHR. He was a member of the Akhil Bharatiya Itihas Sankalan Yojana, an affiliate of the Hindu-nationalist Rashtriya Swayamsevak Sangh (RSS), and the head of its Andhra Pradesh branch.

His appointment to the ICHR was controversial. It was criticized by historians and seen as an effort by the administration of Narendra Modi to fill government institutions with individuals ideologically aligned with the RSS. Rao holds the belief that the Hindu epics, the Ramayana and the Mahabharata, are accurate accounts of Indian history and when appointed he promised to prove the historicity of those epics. He has also spoken out in defense of the caste system.

== Career ==
=== Academia ===
Rao was a professor of history at Kakatiya University in Telangana, where he also served as the head of the Department of History and Tourism Management, and as the dean of the school of Social Sciences. He studied only ancient Indian culture and history of Hinduism. A report in The Hindu stated that he has published over forty research papers in various journals and contributed to the Andhra Pradesh History Congress besides guiding eight PhD students. Prior to his appointment as ICHR chairperson in 2014, Rao was a relatively unknown historian, who had not published articles in peer-reviewed journals. His publications were pieces in the popular media about the historicity of Indian epics.

=== ICHR ===
Rao was a member of the Indian Council of Historical Research (ICHR) during the first NDA government led by the Bharatiya Janata Party. In July 2014, the National Democratic Alliance government re-inducted Rao into ICHR and appointed him chairperson. After serving as chairperson for 16 months, Rao was reported to have submitted a resignation from his position on 24 November 2015, citing personal reasons. However, the government did not accept the resignation. The ICHR describes him as having been chairperson from July 2014 to July 2017.

Rao also served as head of the Andhra Pradesh chapter of Akhil Bharatiya Itihas Sankalan Yojana (ABISY), a subsidiary organisation of Rashtriya Swayamsevak Sangh. In March 2015, three other ABISY-affiliated historians were nominated as members to the Council at the recommendation of Rao. The appointments, as well as Rao's, were described by commentators as an effort by the Modi administration to fill government institutions with individuals ideologically aligned with the RSS, as part of an effort at saffronisation.

Rao's tenure at the ICHR was subject to sharp criticism. Prior to his appointment, he was a relatively unknown historian with no history of publishing research in peer-reviewed publications, and his appointment was seen as an effort by the administration of Narendra Modi to fill government institutions with individuals ideologically aligned with the RSS. Under Rao, the council chose to dissolve the advisory committee for the journal it published, that had been composed of several well-known historians. Gopinath Ravindran, another ICHR member, resigned from the committee in 2015, stating that Rao was running it in an autocratic manner, and stating that most of the committee had no scholarly credentials. Rao also announced plans to study whether Adam's Bridge was a man-made structure, but Arvind Jamkhedkar, his successor as ICHR chairperson, stated that they would not be pursued.

== Views and reception ==
Rao holds the belief that the Hindu epics, the Ramayana and the Mahabharata, are accurate accounts of Indian history. Following his appointment to the ICHR, he promised to prove the historicity of those epics. He rejects the Indo-Aryan migration theory as a colonial construct. In 2007, Rao stated that the Indian caste system worked well and was not a discriminatory institution.

His appointment as ICHR chairperson was also criticized by other eminent historians including D. N. Jha, and by former members of the ICHR, including from right-wing historians. Romila Thapar questioned the academic rigor of Rao's work, and stated that Rao's lack of peer-reviewed publications meant his work had little visibility to historians. Thapar went on to describe Rao's intentions to of ascribing historicity about the Hindu epics as a futile endeavor. She wrote that Rao, like many other Hindutva ideologues, did not understand what Marxist historiography was, and called any research that ran contrary to the goals of Hindu nationalism "Marxist".

An Outlook article noted that he was a scarcely cited scholar with no established track-record and that his blog-posts on different aspects of the subject, which frequently delineated the boundaries between myth and history and ran on a course of faith alone, have only caused concern among academics. The historian Ramachandra Guha described him as a right wing ideologue, who did not recognize the difference between history and myth.
