= William Augustine Ogden =

American hymn composer and music leader (1841–1897)

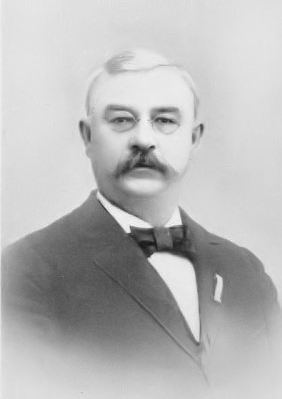
- Portrait of Ogden in a 1914 publication
- Born: October 10, 1841; Franklin County, Ohio, U.S.
- Died: October 14, 1897 (aged 56); Toledo, Ohio, U.S.
- Resting place: Woodlawn Cemetery
- Occupations: Chorister; Music educator; Composer
- Employer(s): Iowa State Normal School, Toledo public school system
- Known for: Sacred music compositions
- Title: Director of Music (c. 1874 Iowa), Superintendent of music (c. 1887 Toledo)

William Augustine Ogden (October 10, 1841 – October 14, 1897) was an American composer, especially of church music and hymns, choir conductor and educator.

== Early life and education ==
William Augustine Ogden was born on October 10, 1841, in Franklin County, Ohio. At the age of six, his family moved to Indiana. He was educated in district schools and began studying music at singing schools at the age of eight.

At the age of 18, Ogden joined the choir in his home church. At the outbreak of the American Civil War, he enlisted in the 13th Indiana Infantry Regiment. During the war, he organized a male choir that was known throughout the Army of the Cumberland. He served as commander for two terms in the department of Ohio, Indiana and Kentucky Union Veterans' Union.

After the war, Ogden returned to Indiana and learned music under the tutelage of Lowell Mason, Thomas Hastings, E. E. Bailey and B. F. Baker.

== Career ==
In 1870, Ogden issued his first song book Silver Song. It reached 500,000 sales. He wrote Sunday school, anthem and gospel music. He wrote two cantatas and two comic operas. Ogden taught in different states, including a normal school in Greensburg, Pennsylvania. He was director of music for six years at the Iowa State Normal School.

In 1881, Ogden moved to Toledo, Ohio. During this time, he collaborated with hymn author and composer Emma Pitt. In 1887, he became superintendent of music of the public schools in Toledo. He served in that role until his death. In 1894, he trained 3,000 children for the Central Ohio Sängerfest.

== Personal life ==
Ogden died on October 14, 1897, at his home in Toledo. He was buried at Woodlawn Cemetery.
