= B. R. Grover =

Indian historian

B.R. Grover
- Scientific career
- Fields: History

B. R. Grover was an Indian historian specialising in medieval Indian history.

== Career ==
He was a professor of history at the Jamia Millia Islamia University.

He served as the Director of Indian Council of Historical Research (ICHR) for 11 years and was appointed its chairman in 1999 on a three-year term.

== Death ==
He died of a heart attack in 2001 while serving as the Chairman of the ICHR.

== Posthumous publications ==
Five volumes of Collected Works of Professor B. R. Grover have been published posthumously by Books for All.
