= Vinod Kumar Grover =

Indian diplomat

Vinod Kumar Grover is a former Secretary of the Ministry of External Affairs of India.

== Career ==
Grover entered the Foreign Service in 1961 and retired in 1996.

In 1982, as High Commissioner to Kenya, Grover signed an India-Kenya credit pact on behalf of the Indian government. From August 1984 until February 1989 he was Indian ambassador to Turkey.

In 1991, while serving as Indian ambassador to the Netherlands, Grover was one of the "22 leading figures from 18 countries" – "individuals with experience in international arbitration, reputations for creativity in problem solving, and general influence in the international legal community" – to sit on the Working Group of the Permanent Court of Arbitration.

In 2005, Grover was one of four special envoys appointed by the Indian government in its bid to obtain a permanent seat on the UN Security Council. In 2006 he was appointed to the National Security Advisory Board.

== Publications ==
- India - The Need for a Post Cold War Foreign Policy and the Importance of the EU, India Quarterly, 57:1, (2001), 171-176
- Appraisal of Indo-Pak Relations, India Quarterly, 57:2, (2001), 11-16
- The Strategic Triangle, India Quarterly, 58:1 (2002), 21-26
