= Thompson & Odell =

Thompson & Odell (ca.1874 – ca.1905) of Boston, Massachusetts, published music and repaired and manufactured musical instruments. Musicians Charles W. Thompson and Ira H. Odell ran the business. Composers they published included hymn author and composer Emma Pitt. They kept a shop on Tremont Street and later on Washington Street. Towards 1900 "Carl Fischer purchased their catalogs of fretted instrument, band and orchestra music. ... About 1905 the Vega Company took over their manufacturing interests."

== Images ==
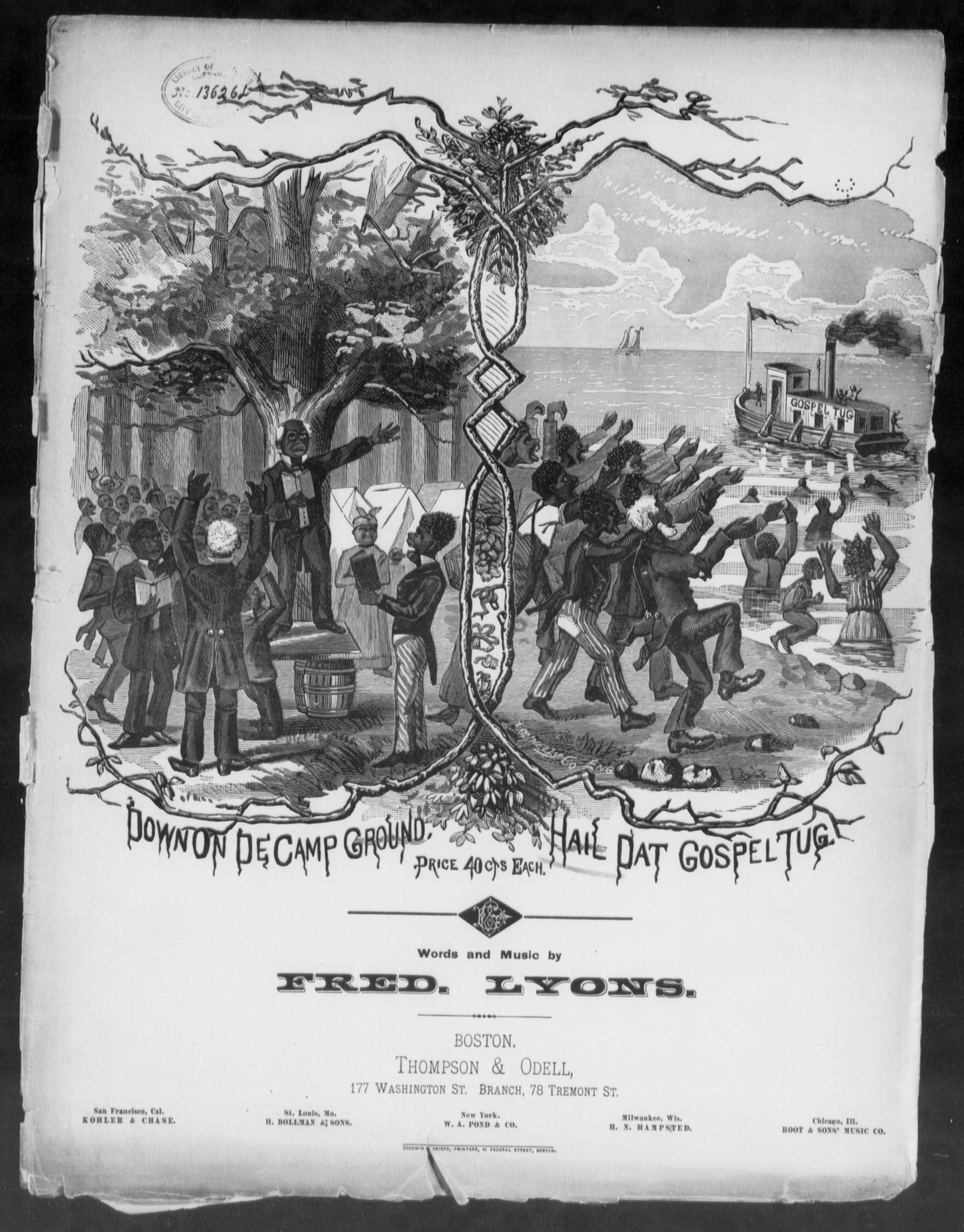
Hail Dat Gospel Tug, by Fred Lyons, 1880 (Library of Congress)

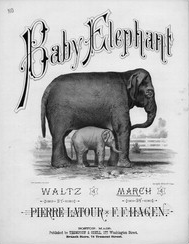
Baby Elephant Waltz by F.F. Hagen, 1882 (Library of Congress)

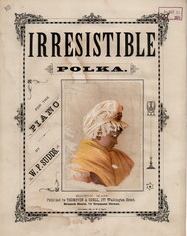
Irresistible Polka by W.F. Sudds, 1882 (Library of Congress)

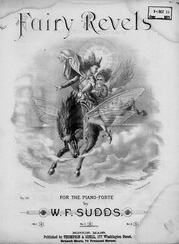
Fairy Revels by W.F. Sudds, 1883 (Library of Congress)
