= Raghuvendra Tanwar =

Indian professor and writer

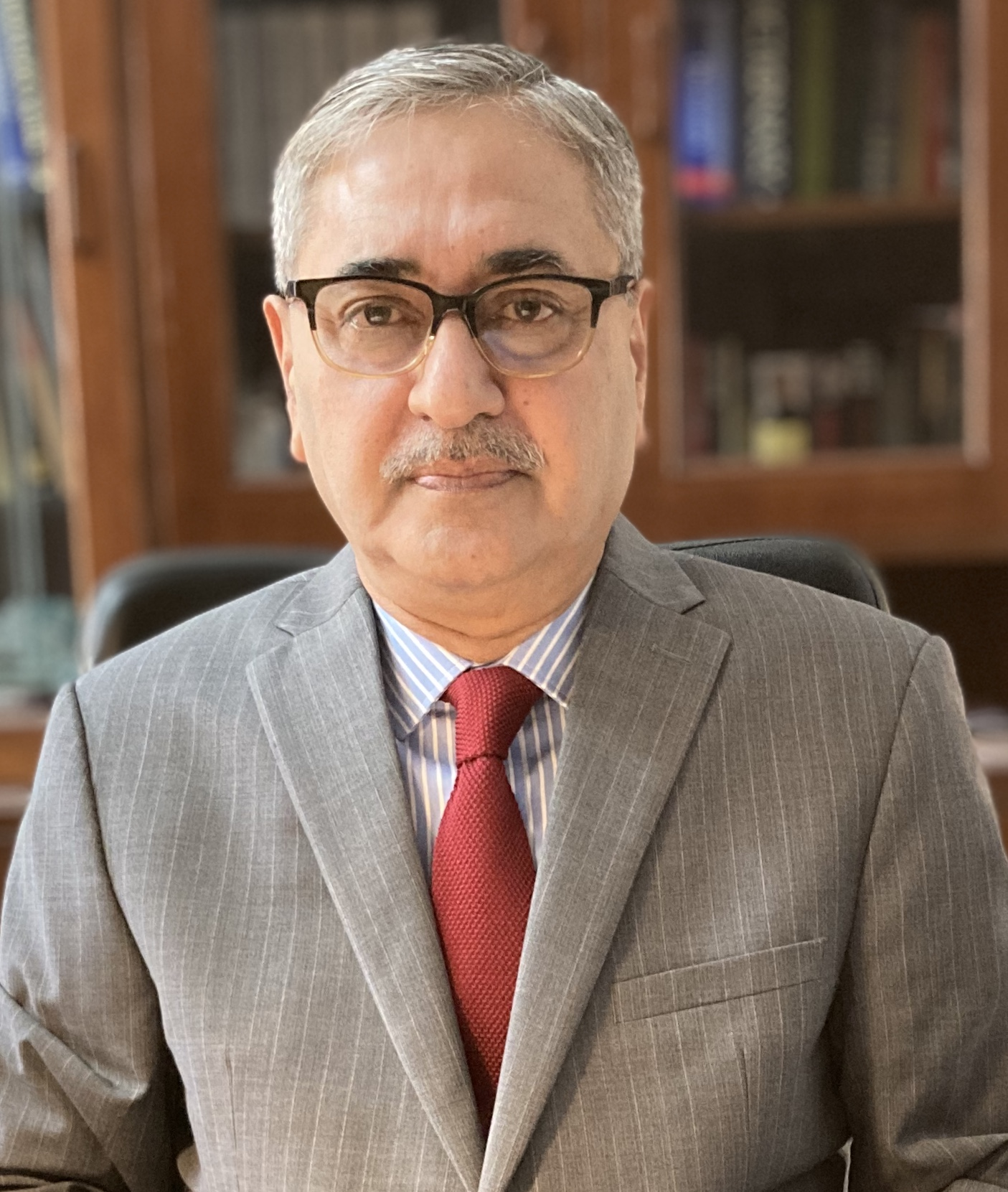
- Occupation: Indian professor

Raghuvendra Tanwar is an Indian professor and writer. In 2022, he was awarded Padma Shri by the Indian Government for his contribution in literature and education.

== Early life and education ==
Tanwar was born into an agricultural family in the village of Lukhi, Kurukshetra, Haryana on 20 Feb. 1955. He received a Master of Arts degree in history from Kurukshetra University.

His wife, Prof. Reicha Tanwar, is a scholar in gender studies and was Professor-Director, Centre for Women Studies, Kurukshetra University, Kurukshetra (Haryana). They have two children.

== Career ==
Tanwar joined Kurukshetra University as a lecturer in August 1977. He was appointed as an open selection professor in 1997 and also worked as the KU's dean of academic affairs. He superannuated in February 2015 as emeritus professor. In July 2016, he was appointed director of the Haryana Academy of History and Culture. He has contributed extensively to development of education in rural areas. At present he is chairman, Indian Council of Historical Research (ICHR), New Delhi. He was also chairman of the Indian Council of Philosophical Research (ICPR), New Delhi. He is noted for introducing important historical issues into common discourse, such as his exhibition "Jammu Kashmir and Ladakh Through the Ages" at the New Delhi World Book Fair (2024). He is also noted for his scholarship on the subject of the Partition of India and the Freedom Struggle.

Tanwar has several publications to his credit, including Reporting the Partition of Punjab (2006, Manohar; ISBN 9788173046742) and Be Clear Kashmir will vote for India (2019, Routledge; ISBN 9781000517538). This recent study has impacted the mainstream narrative on the contemporary history of Jammu Kashmir (post 1947). His most recent work is The Story of India’s Partition (2021, Government of India; ISBN 9789354091827). Additional publications include The Politics of Sharing Power: The Punjab Unionist Party 1923-1947 (Manohar, 1999; ISBN 9788173042720), a study on the Punjab's political system in the decades leading to the partition; India: Mother of Democracy (Edited) (2022, Indian Council of Historical Research; ISBN 9789395472036); and Frankly Speaking: Essays and Opinions (2012).

== Awards ==
- UGC National Fellowship (Research Award) (2002–2005).
- President Punjab History Conference (Modern), 2001.
- President Indian History Congress (Contemporary), 2008.
- Major UGC Research Project, 2013.
- General President Punjab History Conference, 2018.
- Padma Shri (Education & Literature), 2022.
