= Malcolm Grover =

British Indian Army general

Sir Malcolm Grover
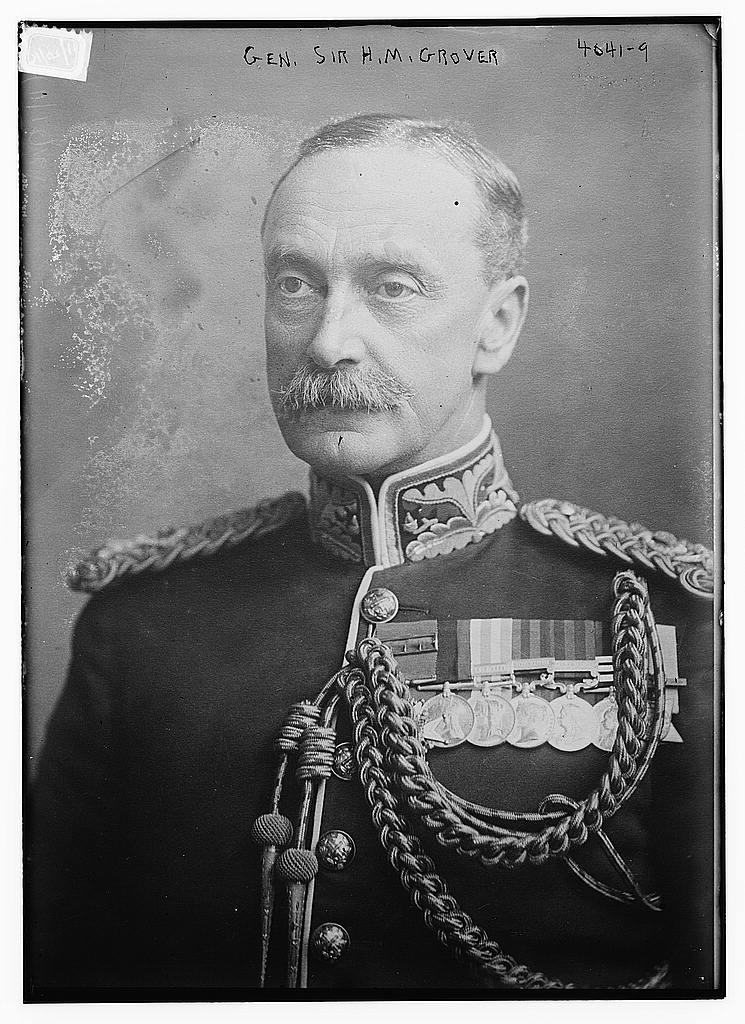
- Born: 19 July 1858
- Died: 16 November 1945 (aged 87)
- Relatives: Major General John Grover (son)
- Military career
- Allegiance: United Kingdom
- Branch: British Indian Army
- Service years: 1876–1919
- Rank: General
- Commands: 4th (Quetta) Division (1913–1916)
- Conflicts: North-West Frontier; Tochi Expedition; First World War
- Awards: Knight Commander of the Order of the Bath; Knight Commander of the Order of the Indian Empire; Mentioned in Despatches

General Sir Malcolm Henry Stanley Grover, KCB, KCIE (19 July 1858 – 16 November 1945) was a senior officer in the British Indian Army.

== Military career ==
Grover was commissioned a sub-lieutenant in the 64th (2nd Staffordshire) Regiment of Foot on 11 September 1876. He was promoted to lieutenant on 15 August 1877, before transferring to the Indian Army and being appointed a lieutenant in the Madras Staff Corps from 4 March 1878. He was promoted to captain on 11 September 1887, posted to the Bengal Staff Corps from November 1890, served as deputy assistant adjutant general to the Waziristan Field Force on the North-West Frontier in 1894–95, and was made a deputy assistant adjutant general in the Bengal Establishment in February 1895. He was appointed deputy assistant quartermaster general to Punjab Command later that year, and was promoted to major on 11 September 1896.

Grover was deputy assistant quartermaster general to the 2nd Punjab Cavalry during the Tochi Expedition in 1897, for which he was mentioned in despatches and granted the brevet rank of lieutenant colonel. Appointed a Companion of the Order of the Bath in the 1906 Birthday Honours, Grover's rank was made substantive on 11 September 1902 and he was promoted to colonel as assistant quartermaster general from 27 November that year.

He was made a colonel on the staff in January 1907, promoted to major general in June 1907, and appointed to command a brigade on the same date.

Grover was appointed as inspector general of cavalry in May 1908, was Secretary to the Government of India, Army Department, from February 1911 to 1912, in which role he succeeded Robert Scallon. He was knighted as a Knight Commander of the Order of the Indian Empire in the 1912 New Year Honours. He was promoted to lieutenant general in September 1912 and advanced to Knight Commander of the Order of the Bath in the 1914 Birthday Honours, and served as commander of the 4th (Quetta) Division during the First World War. He relinquished command of the division in 1916 and was promoted to general on 27 August 1917. He retired from the Indian Army on 12 April 1919.

== Personal life ==
Grover married Helen Grace Lawrence, granddaughter of Sir George St Patrick Lawrence. Their son was Major General John Grover.
