= John Grover (cricketer) =

English cricketer

Personal information
- Full name: John Nelson Grover
- Born: 21 October 1915; Hexham, Northumberland, England
- Died: 17 December 1990 (aged 75); Waytown, Dorset, England
- Batting: Right-handed
- Bowling: Right-arm medium

Domestic team information
- Years: Team
- 1935–1950: Northumberland
- 1936–1938: Oxford University

Career statistics
Competition	First-class
Matches	33
Runs scored	1,188
Batting average	11.20
100s/50s	3/4
Top score	121
Balls bowled	24
Wickets	0
Bowling average	–
5 wickets in innings	–
10 wickets in match	–
Best bowling	–
Catches/stumpings	12/–
- Source: Cricinfo, 14 June 2019

John Nelson Grover (21 October 1915 – 17 December 1990) was an English first-class cricketer.

Grover was born at Hexham to Ehret Ernest Grove and his wife, Frieda Grover. He was educated at Winchester College between 1929–34, after which he went up to Brasenose College, Oxford. He debuted in minor counties cricket for Northumberland in the 1935 Minor Counties Championship. While studying at the University of Oxford, Grover made his debut in first-class cricket for Oxford University against Yorkshire at Oxford in 1936. In his second match against Lancashire he scored 119 runs. He played eleven first-class matches in 1936, gaining his blue. He played fourteen first-class matches for the university in 1937, but was below his best for most of the season, save for a century against the Minor Counties. He captained Oxford in 1938, playing a further eight matches, though Grover and the team as a whole struggled in the season. He played a total of 33 first-class matches for Oxford, scoring 1,188 runs at an average of 23.76. A free-scoring aggressive batsman, he scored three centuries and made a high score of 121. Following the Second World War, in which his younger brother Charles was killed, Grover returned to playing minor counties cricket for Northumberland, playing for the county until 1950. He died in December 1990 at Waytown, Dorset.
