= John Grover (British Army officer) =

British Army general (1897–1979)

Major-General John Grover CB MC*
- Born: 6 February 1897; Murree, Punjab Province, British India
- Died: 11 June 1979 (aged 82); Crowborough, East Sussex, England
- Relatives: General Sir Malcolm Grover (father)
- Military career
- Allegiance: United Kingdom
- Branch: British Army
- Service years: 1914–1948
- Rank: Major-General
- Service number: 10337
- Unit: King's Shropshire Light Infantry
- Commands: 2nd Infantry Division (1941–44); 29th Infantry Brigade Group (1941); 11th Infantry Brigade (1940–41); 1st Battalion, King's Shropshire Light Infantry (1938–39)
- Conflicts: First World War; Western Front; North-West Frontier; Second World War; Battle of France; Burma campaign
- Awards: Companion of the Order of the Bath; Military Cross & Bar; Mentioned in Despatches

Major-General John Malcolm Lawrence Grover, CB, MC & Bar (6 February 1897 – 11 June 1979) was a British Army officer who commanded the 2nd Infantry Division in the Burma campaign, including in the Battle of Kohima, during the Second World War.

A graduate of Winchester College and the Royal Military College, Sandhurst, Grover was commissioned as a second lieutenant into the King's Shropshire Light Infantry (KSLI) in 1914. During the First World War, he served on the Western Front, where he was wounded in action three times and awarded the Military Cross and bar. Between the wars he served with his regiment in India, where he saw service on the North-West Frontier and attended the Staff College, Quetta. He became commanding officer of the 1st Battalion, KSLI in 1938.

Following the outbreak of the Second World War in September 1939, Grover's battalion was deployed to France, where it formed part of the British Expeditionary Force (BEF). In December, he became a staff officer with the 5th Division, a position he held throughout the Battle of France. He assumed command of the 2nd Division in October 1941.

== Early life and military career ==
Grover was born in British India, the son of General Sir Malcolm Grover and Helen Grace Lawrence, granddaughter of Sir George St Patrick Lawrence. Educated at Winchester College and the Royal Military College, Sandhurst, Grover was, at the age of 17, commissioned as a second lieutenant into the King's Shropshire Light Infantry (KSLI) on 15 December 1914, four months after the outbreak of the First World War. After turning 18, he was posted to the regiment's 1st Battalion in 1915, then serving on the Western Front as part of the 16th Brigade of the 6th Division, a Regular Army formation, which had sustained heavy losses. Serving with his battalion for the rest of the war, Grover was awarded the Military Cross and Bar for his service, and was wounded in action three times.

== Between the wars ==
Remaining in the army during the interwar period, spent mostly as a captain with his battalion in India, Grover married in 1930. He became Deputy Assistant Quartermaster-General, India, and saw service on the North-West Frontier from 1930 to 1931. He attended the Staff College, Quetta from 1932 to 1933 and, after serving as a staff officer with Aldershot Command and commanding the KSLI regimental depot, he became commanding officer of the 1st Battalion, KSLI in 1938, which had just arrived in England from India.

== Second World War ==
Shortly after the outbreak of the Second World War in September 1939, Grover, still commanding officer of the battalion, now serving as part of the 3rd Brigade of the 1st Division (Major General The Hon. Harold Alexander) led it overseas to France, where it formed part of the British Expeditionary Force (BEF). There was no immediate action and the battalion spent the first few months of its time in France digging defensive positions in expectation of a repeat of the trench warfare of the First World War. From 18 to 28 December Grover took over as acting commander of the 3rd Brigade and soon afterwards was posted to the 5th Division (Major General Harold Franklyn) as its General Staff Officer Grade I (GSO1).

The 5th Division was also serving in France as part of the BEF. By May 1940 it was decided that the 5th Division should return to the United Kingdom as a reserve formation; this was soon countermanded. On the following day, 10 May, the Germans launched their long-waited assault in the west and the 5th Division fought throughout the Battle of France, in particular at the Battle of Arras and the Battle of the Ypres–Comines Canal, before being ordered to retreat to Dunkirk, where most of the division, by now severely depleted after suffering many casualties, was evacuated to England, arriving there on the night of 31 May/1 June.

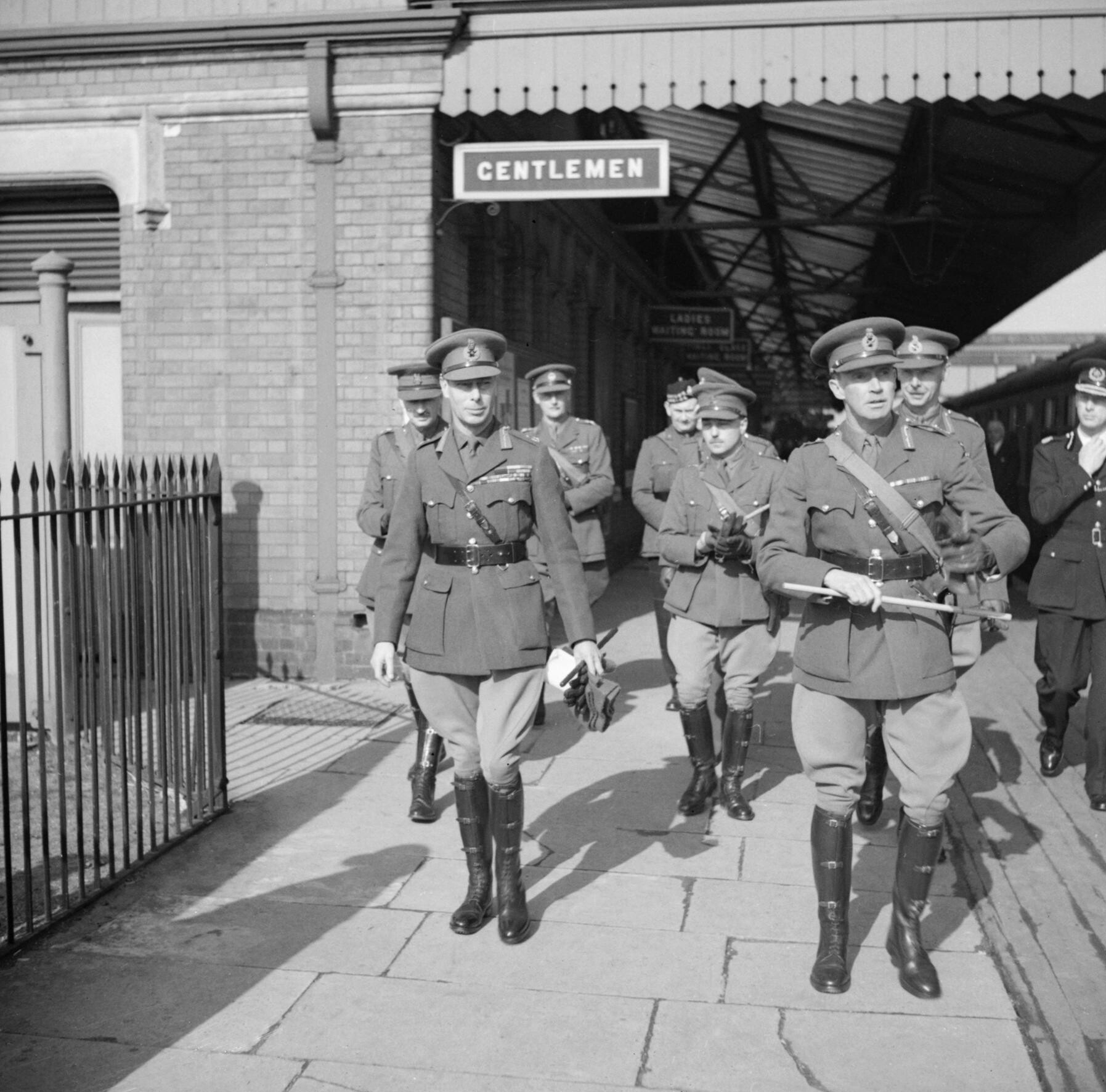
King George VI (left) with Major General John Grover (right) and several officers at a railway station at Gloucestershire, 1 April 1942.

Just two weeks later Grover left the division, received promotion to brigadier, and was posted to the 4th Division (Major General Dudley Johnson, soon replaced by Major General Ralph Eastwood), to command the 11th Brigade, taking over from Brigadier Kenneth Anderson. Like the 5th Division, the 4th had also recently returned from France, suffered many casualties, and needed to refit. The brigade, stationed along with the rest of the division in southern England, was now given anti-invasion duties and training to repel Operation Sea Lion the anticipated German invasion. Grover remained there until January 1941 and, after handing over the 11th Brigade to Brigadier Vyvyan Evelegh, he was posted to the 29th Infantry Brigade Group, succeeding Brigadier Oliver Leese. The brigade was formerly an independent formation, comprising four Regular battalions and supporting troops, all of whom had returned from service in India in July 1940 after Dunkirk, and was serving as part of the West Sussex County Division (Leese). Grover trained the brigade throughout most of the year until, in October, he handed over to Brigadier Francis Festing, formerly commanding officer of the 2nd Battalion, East Lancashire Regiment.

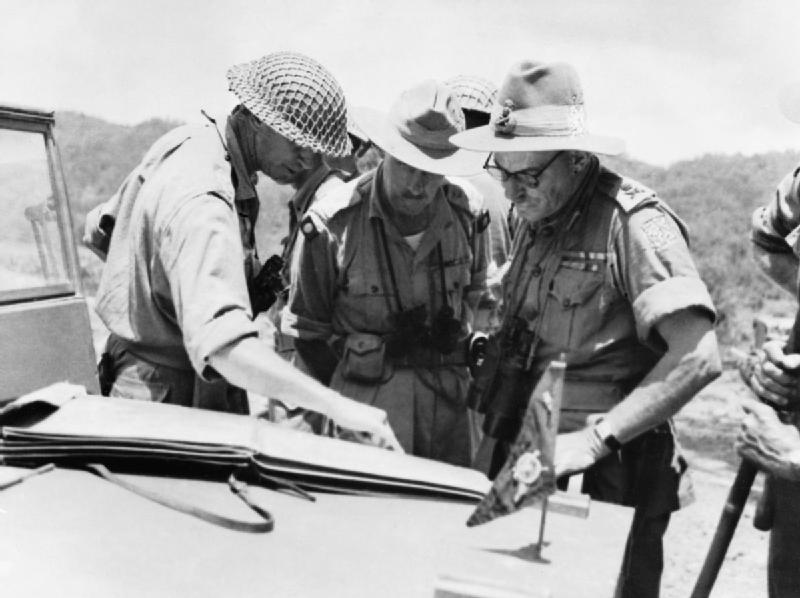
Lieutenant General Montagu Stopford, GOC XXXIII Indian Corps (right), confers with Major General John Grover, GOC 2nd Division (left) and Brigadier Joseph Salomons, then commanding the 9th Indian Brigade (centre), after the opening of the Imphal–Kohima road, June 1944.

Grover assumed command of the 2nd Infantry Division on 11 October 1941, with the rank of major general. The division went to India, where he devised and implemented a strategy to remove the Japanese from the Kohima region, leading to the defeat of the Imperial Japanese Army at the Battle of Kohima between April and June 1944. During the battle Grover's division suffered many casualties, in May losing all three brigade commanders, but gaining the division's third Victoria Cross of the war, belonging to Captain John Randle of the 2nd Battalion, Royal Norfolk Regiment. Despite being victorious in this battle, Grover was removed from command on 4 July 1944 by Lieutenant General Montagu Stopford, the corps commander, who was unhappy with Grover's methods. His replacement as GOC of the 2nd Division was Major General Cameron Nicholson. Grover accepted his dismissal stoically and went on to be Director of Army Welfare Services at the War Office in 1944 before retiring from the army in 1948.

== Postwar ==
Grover became Colonel of the King's Shropshire Light Infantry in 1947, holding this post until 1955. In 2014, on the 70th anniversary of the Battle of Kohima, a memorial to Grover was unveiled at Jotsama on the site of his 2nd Division Headquarters.

== Bibliography ==
- Keane, Fergal (2010). Road of Bones: The Siege of Kohima 1944. London: HarperPress. ISBN 978-0-00-713240-9.
- Smart, Nick (2005). Biographical Dictionary of British Generals of the Second World War. Barnesley: Pen & Sword. ISBN 1844150496.
- Swinson, Arthur (2015). Kohima. London: Head of Zeus. ISBN 9781784081782.

Military offices
Preceded by Daril Watson	General Officer Commanding 2nd Infantry Division; 1941–1944	Succeeded by Cameron Nicholson
Honorary titles
Preceded by Sir Charles Grant	Colonel of the King's Shropshire Light Infantry; 1947–1955	Succeeded by Sir Ernest Down
