= Indian Historical Review =

- Discipline: History & South Asian Studies
- Language: English
- Edited by: Raghuvendra Tanwar

Publication details
- History: July 1999
- Publisher: Sage Publications India Pvt. Ltd.
- Frequency: Bi-annually

Standard abbreviations
- ISO 4: Indian Hist. Rev.

Indexing
- ISSN: 0376-9836 (print); 0975-5977 (web)

Links
- Journal homepage; Online access; Online archive

The Indian Historical Review is a peer-reviewed academic journal published bi-annually in association with the Indian Council of Historical Research.

The journal is a member of the Committee on Publication Ethics (COPE). It is edited by Raghuvendra Tanwar

== Abstracting and indexing ==
Indian Historical Review is abstracted and indexed in:

- Bibliography of Asian Studies (BAS)
- Clarivate Analytics: Arts & Humanities Citation Index (AHCI)
- DeepDyve
- Dutch-KB
- EBSCOIndian Citation Index (ICI)
- J-Gate
- OCLC
- Ohio
- Portico
- ProQuest: Social Science Premium Collection
- SCOPUS
- UGC-CARE (GROUP II)
