= Tata 1mg =

Healthcare platform in Gurugram, India

TATA 1mg

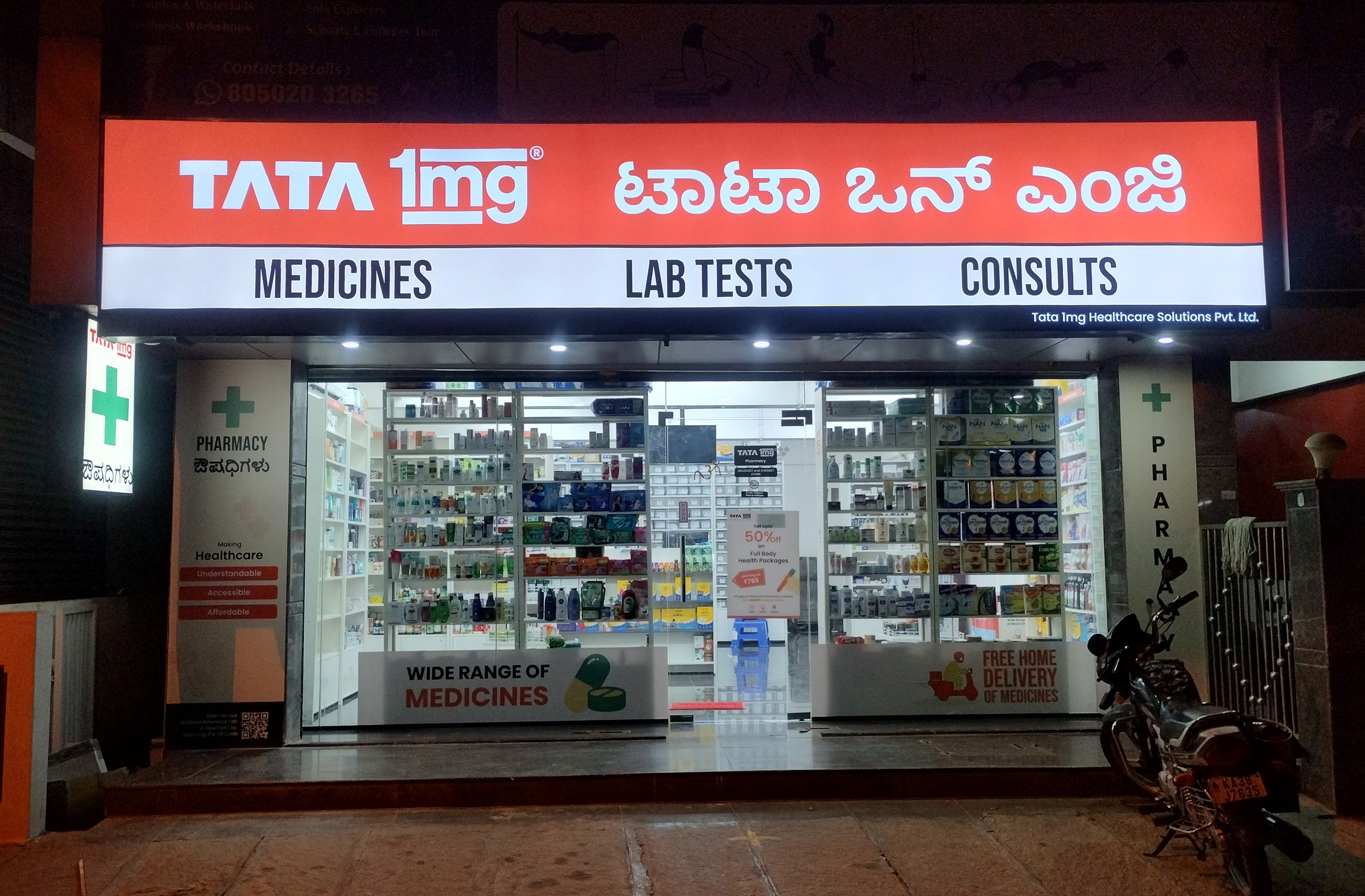
- A Tata 1mg store at RR Nagar, Bangalore (2026)
- Type: Private
- Industry: Healthcare; E-commerce; Information technology; Retail
- Founded: 2015; 11 years ago
- Founder: Prashant Tandon; Gaurav Agarwal; Vikas Chauhan
- Headquarters: Gurugram, Haryana, India
- Area served: India
- Key people: Prashant Tandon (CEO); Gaurav Agarwal (CTO); Vikas Chauhan; Tanmay Saksena (COO)
- Products: Medicine Supply; Healthcare Products
- Services: Online pharmacy; Online doctor; E-consultation; Diagnostic; Lab blood test
- Revenue: ▲₹1,968 crore (US$200 million) (2024)
- Net income: ▼₹−313 crore (US$−33 million) (2024)
- Number of employees: 800+ (2021)
- Parent: Tata Digital

Tata 1mg, formerly known as 1mg, is an Indian digital healthcare company headquartered in Gurugram, Haryana. The company provides integrated healthcare services—including e-pharmacy, e-diagnostics, and tele-consultation—through a digital platform and a growing network of physical retail pharmacies and diagnostic laboratories across India.

It was founded in April 2015 by Prashant Tandon, Gaurav Agarwal, and Vikas Chauhan. the company has since expanded to include speciality care services covering cancer care, obesity management, and at-home adult vaccination, along with private label health and nutrition products and corporate health and wellness programmes.

== History ==
In 2012, Bright Lifecare Private Limited launched a digital health platform called HealthkartPlus. In 2015, HealthkartPlus was spun off to form 1MG Technologies Private Limited. Healthkart continued as a separate entity focused on fitness and nutrition products; while 1mg operated as a generic drug search and price comparison platform.

The company subsequently developed an online medicine database providing information on drug usage, side effects and generic substitutes, and expanded into home delivery of prescription and over-the-counter medicines as well as diagnostic testing services.

In June 2021, Tata Digital Ltd. acquired a majority stake of approximately 55% in 1mg, after which the platform was rebranded as Tata 1mg and integrated into the Tata Group's digital ecosystem.

In 2023, Tata 1mg was reported to hold approximately 31% of the Indian e-pharmacy market by GMV, making it the largest e-pharmacy platform in India at that time.

In 2024, Tata 1mg and Vitonnix UK jointly introduced Vitamin Sublingual Sprays in Indian market. The first phase of the launch includes vitamin D, multivitamins, biotin, and melatonin.

In December 2025, the company reported positive EBITDA across its core business lines.

== Services ==
Tata 1mg provides healthcare services through an omnichannel model, combining a digital platform with a network of physical retail pharmacies and diagnostic laboratories.

ePharmacy

Tata 1mg's e-pharmacy service enables users to order prescription medicines, over-the-counter products, and healthcare essentials. Medicines are sourced from licensed manufacturers and authorised distributors. As of 2026, the service covers more than 20,000 pin codes across India.

eDiagnostics

Tata 1mg's diagnostics service provides home sample collection and laboratory testing through a network of NABL-accredited laboratories. The company operates a National Reference Laboratory in Okhla, New Delhi, which holds accreditation from the College of American Pathologists (CAP).

Retail Pharmacies

Tata 1mg operates a network of physical retail pharmacies across India. As of 2026, the company operates more than 280 retail pharmacy outlets, with plans to expand to approximately 500 outlets by the end of the year.

Specialty Pharma

Tata 1mg offers speciality care services spanning cancer care, obesity management, and at-home adult vaccination, available across multiple cities in India. These services are designed to support patients requiring ongoing therapy management and access to specialty medicines.

== Partnership ==
In March 2022, Tata 1mg made a strategic investment in 5C Network for an undisclosed amount. In May 2025, Tata 1mg partnered with Unicommerce to enhance its e-commerce efficiency across over 1,000 cities in India. The collaboration involved the integration of Unicommerce’s SaaS technology to automate multi-channel order management and warehouse operations.

== See also ==
- MedPlus
- Online pharmacy laws in India
- PharmEasy
- Medlife
- Flipkart Health+
