= Meenakshi Jain =

Indian historian

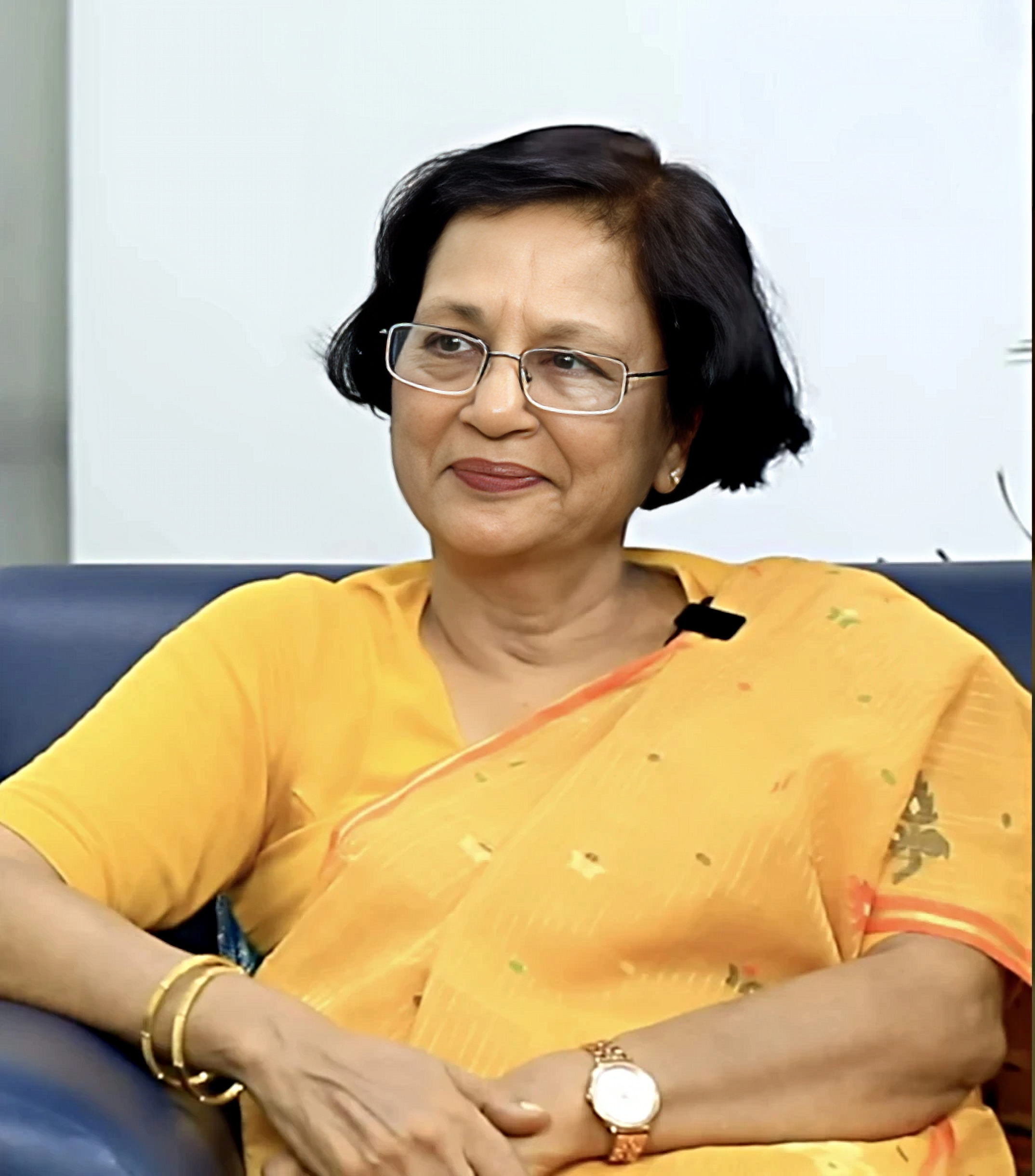
- Meenakshi Jain in 2025

Member of Parliament, Rajya Sabha
- Incumbent
- Assumed office 21 July 2025
- Nominated by: Droupadi Murmu
- Preceded by: Rakesh Sinha
- Constituency: Nominated (Literature and Education)

Personal details
- Born: Delhi, India
- Parent: Girilal Jain (father)
- Relatives: Sunil Jain (brother); Sandhya Jain (sister)
- Education: University of Delhi (PhD)
- Occupation: Historian, Writer, Political scientist
- Known for: Sati: Evangelicals, Baptist Missionaries, and the Changing Colonial Discourse
- Awards: Padma Shri (2020)

Meenakshi Jain is an Indian political scientist and historian who served as an associate professor of history at Gargi College, Delhi. Her areas of research include cultural and religious developments in medieval and early modern India. In 2014, she was nominated as a member of the Indian Council of Historical Research by the Government of India. In 2020, she was conferred with the Padma Shri, India's fourth highest civilian award, for her work in the field of literature and education.

Jain wrote Sati: Evangelicals, Baptist Missionaries, and the Changing Colonial Discourse on the involvement of evangelicals and missionaries in exaggerating the number of Sati cases in colonial India. She had also authored a school history textbook, Medieval India, for NCERT, which replaced a previous textbook co-authored by marxist historians such as Romila Thapar, and Satish Chandra.

Meenakshi Jain was nominated to Rajya Sabha by President Droupadi Murmu on 12 July 2025.

== Early life and education ==
Meenakshi Jain is the daughter of journalist Girilal Jain, a former editor of The Times of India. She received her Ph.D. in political science from the University of Delhi. Her thesis on the social base and relations between caste and politics was published in 1991.

== Career ==
Jain is an associate professor of history at Gargi College, affiliated with the University of Delhi. In December 2014, she was nominated as a member of the Indian Council of Historical Research by the Indian government. She is former Fellow of the Nehru Memorial Museum and Library and currently Senior Fellow of the Indian Council of Social Science Research (ICSSR).

Her books include, Flight of Deities and Rebirth of Temples, The Battle for Rama: Case of the Temple at Ayodhya and Rama and Ayodhya, and Sati: Evangelicals, Baptist Missionaries, and the Changing Colonial Discourse .

=== Temple Histories and Civilizational Works ===
In her 2024 book, Vishwanath Rises and Rises: The Story of Eternal Kashi, Jain details the continuous historical trajectory of the Kashi Vishwanath temple. Speaking at the Mangaluru Lit Fest, she also argued that literary and archaeological evidence proves Kashi has existed as a prominent spiritual center since the time of the Upanishads, detailing how the city's temples were repeatedly rebuilt by Hindus after being razed during Islamic rule.

=== Views on Indian civilization ===
Jain advocates a "decolonial" approach to historiography, arguing that Indian history must be analyzed from an indigenous perspective rather than a foreign one, she even emphasizes that common people, rather than just royalty, played the primary role in building and preserving Indian civilization across millennia. Jain says that historical narratives depicting internal conflicts between Hindus, Jains, and Buddhists were part of a deliberate British "divide and rule" conspiracy, claiming that followers of these indigenous faiths historically coexisted together, harmoniously.

== Reception ==
=== Medieval India (textbook) ===
Philosopher Martha Nussbaum noted Jain to be an amateur historian, who despite being trained as a sociologist, was inducted as a historian in service of a political mission. Her Medieval India rendered the time-span through a monoscopic clash-of-civilizations narrative between the forces of good (Hindus) and evil (Muslims); the tensions and internal conflicts between these seemingly homogeneous groups were done away with. Nonetheless, Nussbaum found her work to be a small "oasis of intelligence", subtlety and literacy, when contrasted with other publications of the new NCERT series, published under the aegis of the Hindu Nationalist government; Professor Pralay Kanungo of Jawaharlal Nehru University reflected similar sentiments.

Similarly, sociologist Nandini Sundar found Medieval India to have portrayed the exactions of the Sultanate rulers and the Mughals as anti-Hindu acts; besides, all of their contributions to the social, cultural and political were ignored. She saw this as part of a broader pattern of state-induced historical negationism to suit the need of Rashtriya Swayamsevak Sangh. John Stratton Hawley of Columbia University found the book to misrepresent the genesis of the Bhakti movement by presenting it as a response to Shankaracharya's monism than to the egalitarian message of Islam.

=== Works on Ayodhya dispute ===
Pralay Kanungo found Jain's Rama and Ayodhya (2013) to be a subtle and sophisticated work that managed to stand apart from the earlier a historical propaganda by Hindutva-leaning historians. While Kanungo praised the book's sophisticated compilation of sources, he also argued that she selectively utilized the evidence to counter post-independence leftist historians, which can be traced in many islamic historian's book.

=== Work on missionary exaggeration of Sati ===
In her book Sati: Evangelicals, Baptist Missionaries, and the Changing Colonial Discourse, Jain argues on the discourse around Sati practice and the involvement of evangelicals and Baptist missionaries. Swadesh Singh, reviewed her book in the Indian Historical Review and described her approach as academic and unbiased and credited her use of range of primary sources. According to Singh, the opening chapter states that the frequency of Sati increased following a contact with Muslim culture; her survey of foreign travel accounts argues that by the 17th century Sati had become a stock "wonder" in European writing on India with travellers sometimes including second-hand or fabricated narratives to meet demand. Jain argues that it was an exceptional act performed by a "minuscule population of Hindu women" over the many centuries and her book describes how the number of cases were exaggerated by evangelicals and Baptist missionaries. They did this so to "Anglicize and Christianize India". He notes Jain's analysis of the 1803 survey organised under William Carey, a Baptist missionary which relied on ten informants around Calcutta and whose results were extrapolated to the rest of India, and her questioning of the official registrations begun in 1815, most of which came from Bengal.

== Award ==
In 2020, President Ram Nath Kovind awarded the Padma Shri for her contribution in the field of Literature and Education.

== Works ==
=== Books ===
- Congress Party, 1967-77: Role of Caste in Indian Politics (Vikas, 1991), ISBN 0706953193.
- Flawed Narratives: History in the old NCERT Textbooks - A random survey of Satish Chandra’s “Medieval India, NCERT 2000, by Meenakshi Jain
- Medieval India: A Textbook for Class XI (NCERT, 2002), ISBN 8174501711.
- Rajah-Moonje Pact: Documents On A Forgotten Chapter Of Indian History (with Devendra Svarupa, Low Price Publishers, 2007), ISBN 8184540787.
- Parallel Pathways: Essays on Hindu-Muslim Relations, 1707-1857 (Konark Publishers, 2010), ISBN 9788122007831.
- The India They Saw (co-edited with Sandhya Jain, 4 Volumes, Prabhat Prakashan), ISBN 8184301065, ISBN 8184301073, ISBN 8184301081, ISBN 818430109X.
- Rama and Ayodhya (Aryan Books International, 2013), ISBN 8173054517.
- Sati: Evangelicals, Baptist Missionaries, and the Changing Colonial Discourse (Aryan Books International, 2016), ISBN 8173055521
- The Battle for Rama: Case of the Temple at Ayodhya (Aryan Books International, 2017), ISBN 8173055793.
- Flight of Deities and Rebirth of Temples: Episodes from Indian History (Aryan Books International, 2019), ISBN 8173056196.
- Vasudeva Krishna and Mathura (Aryan Books International, 2021), ISBN 8173056587
- The Hindus of Hindustan: A Civilizational Journey (Aryan Books International, 2023), ISBN 8173056811
- The British Makeover of India: Judicial and Other Indigenous Institutions Upturned, (Aryan Books International, 2024)ISBN 8173057044
- Vishwanath Rises and Rises: The Story of Eternal Kashi (Aryan Books International, 2024), ISBN 8173056994

=== Selected articles ===
- "Congress 1967: Strategies of Mobilisation in D. A. Low" in The Indian National Congress Centenary Hindsights, 1988.
- "Backward Castes and Social Change in U. P. and Bihar" in Srinivas, Caste: Its 20th Century Avatar (2000).
- A review of Romila Thapar's Somanatha: Many Voices of a History over The Pioneer (India).

== See also ==
- Jadunath Sarkar
- R. C. Majumdar
- Sita Ram Goel
