= List of Hindu comparative theologians =

This is a list of notable Hindu comparative theologians, Hindu scholars or preachers engaged in Hindu comparative religion studies.

- Adi Shankaracharya
- Ram Mohan Roy
- Swami Vivekananda
- Dayanand Saraswati
- Ram Swarup
- Sita Ram Goel
- Arun Shourie
- Sarvepalli Radhakrishnan
- Girish Chandra Sen
- Pandit Lekh Ram

== See also ==
- List of writers on Hinduism
