= Lists of Hindus =

This is a list of various lists of Hindus grouped under related sections.

Aum symbole of Hinduism

== Religion and philosophy ==
- List of Hindu gurus and sants
- List of teachers of Vedanta
- List of teachers of Advaita Vedanta
- List of Hindu comparative theologians
- List of writers on Hinduism
- List of teachers of Vedanta

== Converts to and from Hinduism ==
- List of converts to Hinduism
- List of converts to Hinduism from Christianity
- List of converts to Hinduism from Buddhism
- List of former Hindus
- List of converts to Christianity from Hinduism

== Other ==
- List of writers on Hinduism
- List of Bangladeshi Hindus
- List of Hindu School people
- List of International Society for Krishna Consciousness members and patrons
- List of Hindu members of the United States Congress

== See also ==
- Category:Hinduism-related lists
