= List of writers on Hinduism =

This is a list of writers on Hinduism. The list should include writers who have Wikipedia articles who have written books about Hinduism. Each entry should indicate the writers most well-known work. Multiple works should be listed only if each work has a Wikipedia article.

== Religious writers ==
- Sri Anirvan
- Ramdas Kathiababa
- Sri Aurobindo
- Amma
- Baba Hari Dass
- Chinmayananda
- Ananda Coomaraswamy
- Dayananda
- Eknath Easwaran
- Satsvarupa dasa Goswami
- Mahendranath Gupta
- Krishnananda Saraswati
- Kripalu Maharaj
- Jiddu Krishnamurti
- Ramana Maharshi
- Maharishi Mahesh Yogi
- The Mother
- Nisargadatta Maharaj
- Sister Nivedita
- Srila Prabhupada
- Prabhavananda
- Ram Dass
- Swami Ramdas
- K. D. Sethna
- Sivananda Saraswati
- Dayananda Saraswati
- Ram Swarup
- Tilak
- Vivekananda
- Yogananda

== Political writers ==
- François Gautier
- Gandhi
- Ram Gopal
- Sita Ram Goel
- Sarvepalli Radhakrishnan
- Arun Shourie
- Tilak

== Scholars ==
- Kripalu Maharaj
- Alain Daniélou
- Dharampal
- Wendy Doniger
- Gavin Flood
- Mircea Eliade
- Koenraad Elst
- Georg Feuerstein
- David Frawley
- Subhash Kak
- Hajime Nakamura

== See also ==
- List of modern Eastern religions writers
- List of Hindu comparative theologians
