= The Calcutta Quran Petition =

Book by Sita Ram Goel

- Author: Sita Ram Goel, Chandmal Chopra
- Language: English
- Subject: Censorship
- Publisher: Voice of India
- Publication date: 1986, 1987, 1999
- Publication place: India
- Media type: Book
- ISBN: 81-85990-58-1
- OCLC: 50035155
- Dewey Decimal: 297/.1228
- LC Class: KNS2162 .A49 1986

The Calcutta Quran Petition is a book by Sita Ram Goel and Chandmal Chopra published by Goel under his Voice of India imprint. The first edition was published in 1986, the second in 1987 and the third in 1999.

The subject matter of this book is censorship, the banning of books and the Quran.

== Himangshu Kishore Chakraborty letter ==
On July 20, 1984, H.K. Chakraborty wrote to the Secretary, Department of Home Government of West Bengal, demanding the ban of the Quran. He wrote again on 14 August that year, but received no response. Chakraborty lived in Bangladesh before moving to Kolkata after Partition of India.

Chakraborty thereafter met Chandmal Chopra, who also wrote to the Department of Home Government of West Bengal on March 16, 1985. But Chopra's letter, too, went unanswered. Chopra therefore filed a writ Petition in the High Court.

== Chandmal Chopra's petition ==
Chandmal Chopra tried to obtain an order banning the Quran, by filing a Writ Petition at the Calcutta High Court on 29 March 1985. The petition claimed that Sections 153A and 295A of the Indian Penal Code, and Section 95 of the Criminal Procedure Code were often used by Muslims to ban or proscribe publications critical of Islam, and stated that "so far it had been the privilege of the Peoples of the Book to ban and burn the sacred literature of the Pagans." Chandmal Chopra thought that the Quran "on grounds of religion promotes disharmony, feeling of enmity, hatred and ill-will between different religious communities and incite people to commit violence and disturb public tranquility..."

Chandmal Chopra also included a list of several dozens of Quran verses that "promote disharmony" in his petition. The book claims that these Quran verses embody one of the main themes of the book: "Nor have these passages been culled at random from different chapters of the Quran with a view to making the book sound sinister. On the contrary, they provide an almost exhaustive list of Allah’s sayings on a subject of great significance, namely, what the believers should believe about and do to the unbelievers..."

The Telegraph of May 9, 1985 reported that the Union Government would make itself a party in the case, and the Union law minister Ashoke Sen and the attorney-general of the Government of India were going to take action against the case. Muslim lawyers after a meeting condemned the case. According to The Telegraph of May 10, the Chief Minister of West Bengal called the petition "a despicable act". Other politicians in the Lok Sabha at New Delhi, and the Minister of State for Law condemned the Petition.

Pakistan's minister of state for religious and minority affairs claimed that the petition was the ‘worst example of religious intolerance’, and he urged the Indian government to ‘follow the example of Pakistan’ in ensuring freedom of religion.

The petition was however dismissed in May 1985. The text of the judgment is included in the book. The Attorney-General of the Government of India and the Advocate-General of West Bengal appeared in the case and argued against Chopra's petition.

On June 18, 1985 Chandmal Chopra filed a review petition, which was dismissed on June 21.

== Riots ==
The petition by Chandmal Chopra led to many riots in India and Bangladesh.

The Statesman reported that "at least 12 people were killed and 100 wounded all are poor Hindus" in a border town of Bangladesh during a demonstration of 1000 people. In Dhaka, at least 20,000 people demonstrated against the petition. The demonstrators were trying to storm the office of India's High Commission. Other riots followed in Kashmir and Bihar.

After the case was closed, the Chief Minister of Jammu and Kashmir, during a mass rally in Srinagar, demanded action against Justice Padma Khastgir who permitted the petition to be filed. During this mass rally, one person was killed and others injured. A "hartal" (strike) against the interference in Muslim personal law was observed during which all shops and colleges were closed.

== Sita Ram Goel ==
On August 31, 1987, Chandmal Chopra was arrested by the police and kept in police custody until September 8 for publishing with Goel this book on the petition. Sita Ram Goel had to abscond to avoid getting arrested.

The authors write in this book that they do "not stand for a ban on the publication of the Quran. We take this opportunity to state unambiguously that we regard banning of books, religious or otherwise, as counterproductive. In the case of the Quran, we believe and advocate that more and more non-Muslims should read it so that they know first hand the quality of its teachings."

The book was received with great interest in India and abroad, according to Goel. Goel also read primary Islamic sources like the Urdu translations of six Hadis during his research for this book. In one chapter, Goel also compares Genghis Khan, the Mongols and Tengiri with Islam.

== Opinion of Media ==
The Times of India published three articles which praised the Quran during the Petition controversy. Goel claims that a rebuttal to these articles could not be published in the Times of India. Goel claims that the chief editor, Girilal Jain, regretted his inability to do so for reasons he could not reveal.

== See also ==
- Criticism of the Qur'an
