= MedPlus =

Indian pharmaceutical retailer

MedPlus Health Services Ltd.
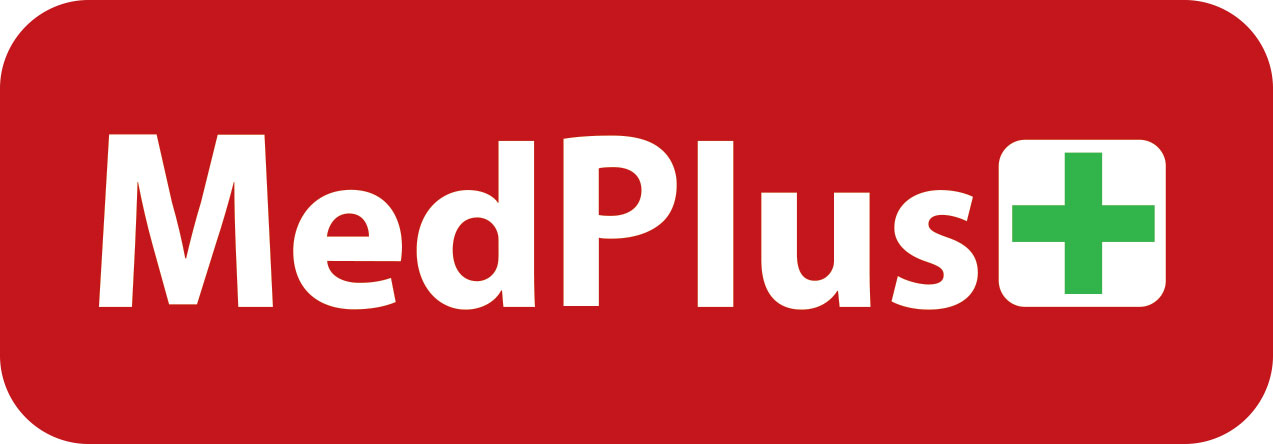

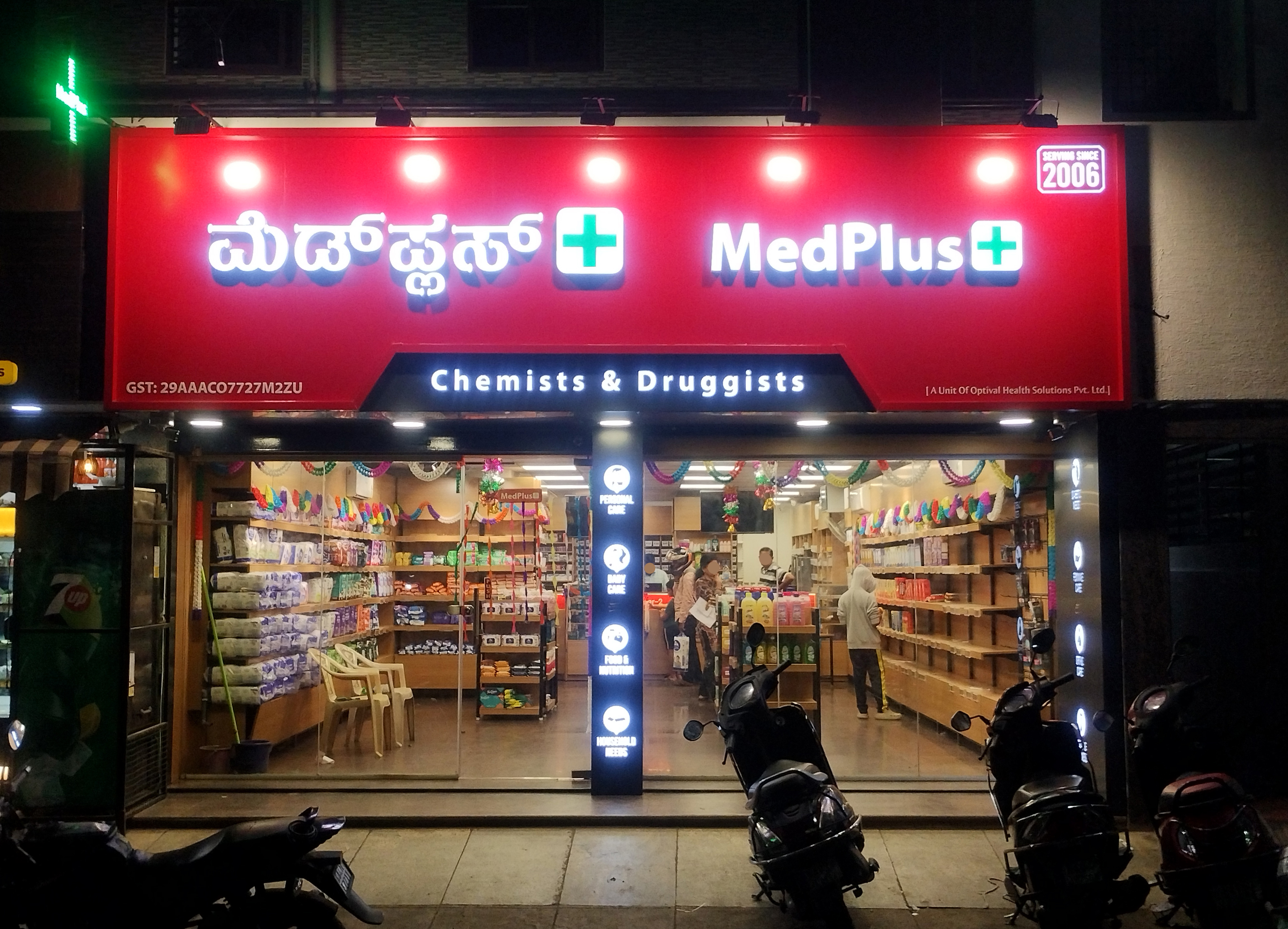
- A MedPlus store in Bengaluru (2026)
- Type: Public
- Traded as: NSE: MEDPLUS; BSE: 543427
- Industry: Pharmacy retail
- Founded: 2006
- Founder: Madhukar Gangadi
- Headquarters: Hyderabad, Telangana, India
- Number of locations: 5500+ stores (2026)
- Area served: India
- Revenue: ▲₹4,603 crore (US$490 million) (FY23)
- Net income: ▼₹49 crore (US$5.2 million) (FY23)
- Number of employees: 10,000+ (2015)
- Subsidiaries: MedPlusMart.com; MedPlusLab.com; MedPlusLens.com; MedPlusIndia.com
- Website: www.medplusindia.com

MedPlus Health Services is an Indian pharmacy retail chain, headquartered in Hyderabad. MedPlus is the second largest pharmacy chain in India, operating over 5,500+ pharmacy stores across 800+ cities, as of 2026.

MedPlus sells prescription and OTC medicines, FMCG products, vitamins and other nutrition supplements, and opticals. It also offers clinical laboratory services and physician consultation services in Hyderabad, Vijayawada and Bangalore. The company owns and runs ePharmacy and an online clinical lab service.

== History ==
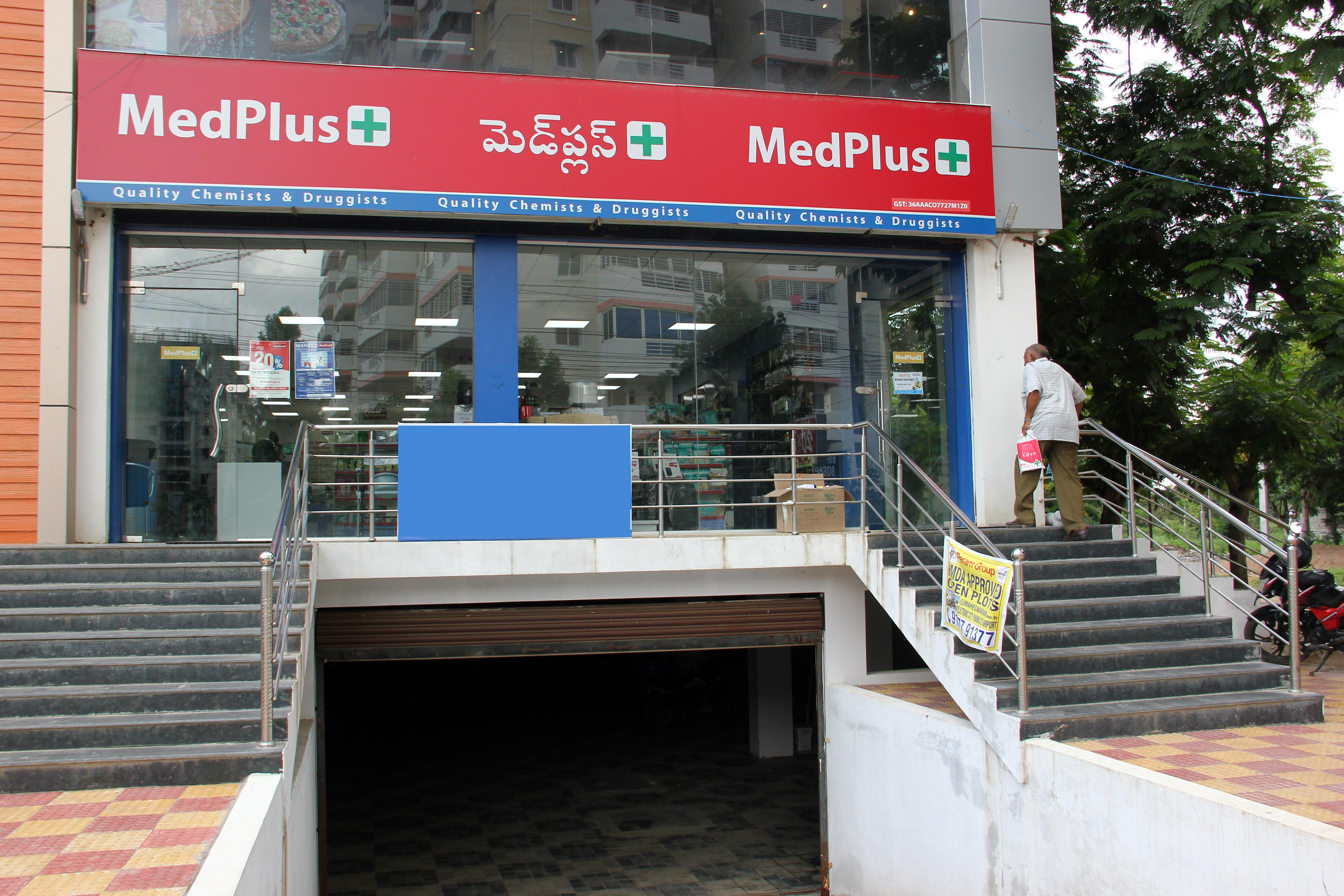
A MedPlus outlet in Hyderabad.

MedPlus was founded in 2006 by Madhukar Gangadi. The company's first store was launched in Hyderabad. Initially operating under the Aushadhi brand name, it was rebranded as MedPlus after the opening of the first 48 stores.

The company opened pharmacies in the western states of Gujarat and Rajasthan in 2007 but had to shut down and exit operations due to recurring losses. It relaunched stores in Ahmedabad, Gujarat in 2014.

In 2008, it opened diagnostics centers in five cities under its subsidiary MedPlus Pathlabs. In 2015, it started its e-pharmacy division.

In December 2021, MedPlus Health Services launched its initial public offering (IPO) and got listed on the Indian stock exchanges.

== Criticism ==
The AIOCD (All India organization of Chemists & Druggists) called for a nationwide strike on 14 October 2015 against online sale of drugs and criticized ePharmacies like MedPlusMart.com as illegal and a threat to the interests of around 8.5 lakhs chemists around India. MedPlus defended its online sales policy as being in compliance with the current drug act and as a valuable service to its customers.

== See also ==
- PharmEasy
- Tata 1mg
- PlatinumRx
