= Tomorrow's India Global Summit =

- Genre: Business conference, Cultural festival
- Location: New Delhi
- Years active: 2016–present
- Website: www.tomorrowsindia.com

The Tomorrow's India Global Summit is an annual global business, knowledge and cultural event. Tomorrow's India is an important wing of the Global Social (India) Foundation. It is an initiative working towards the elevation of talent across a number fields such as education, literature, leadership, music, the arts, and culture. Words of courage, stories of inspiration and actions of change is the aim of Tomorrow's India, which is presented in thematic pattern with the help of dialogues, discussions and debates with the pioneers in the field across the globe. The Summit is the brainchild of H P Singh, chairman and managing director of Satin Creditcare Network Limited.

== History, timeline ==
=== 2016 Singapore ===
The 2016 edition of Tomorrow's India Global Summit was organised by the RICE Company Limited, with GAC Ventures participating as its Green and Sustainability partner. The venue was Shangri-La Hotel, Orchard, Singapore. It featured a number of personalities from different fields such as Gopinath Pillai, Prahlad Kakkar, Arokiaswamy Velumani, Vijay Thakur Singh – the high commissioner to Singapore, Suneeta Reddy – managing director ApolloHospitals Group, Mark Runacres – Senior Advisor International Affairs & Co-founder of the British education Centre, Theng Dar Teng – Hub Honcho OIIO Hub Pte Ltd.

=== 2016 Korea ===
At Incheon, the grand event was inaugurated by Vikram Doraiswami, Indian Ambassador to Republic of Korea, H P Singh, managing director and Founder of Tomorrow's India Global Summit, Yoo, Jeong-bok, Mayor of Incheon Metropolitan City and Lee, Kang-shin, Chairman of Incheon Chamber of Commerce and Industry. The four-day summit witnessed the participation of over 150 delegates including industry leaders, business experts and students from across the globe. The highlight of the summit was the announcement of a Memorandum of Understanding signed between GSIF and Seoul Metropolitan City to promote business and trade relations between India and Korea. The event had a focused initiative to offer expansion and investment opportunities to Indian start-ups, MSMEs. Corporate businesses saw Bangalore-based Uber Diagnostics raise Rs. 15 million in funding from global investors. Korea also launched an e-book on Digital India and Smart Cities. A start-up from Kerala 'Avant Garde Innovations' that envisions electricity at every home and assures to put an end to power woes in the state with its innovative low cost high energy wind power generator, was felicitated at Tomorrow's India Global Summit at Seoul. It featured a number of speakers from across the globe such as – Vikram Doraiswami, Ambassador of India to Republic of Korea, Devita Saraf, Dalton Sembiring – Minister, Deputy Chief of Mission, Edmbassy of the Republic of Indonesia to India, Yang Chang – Soo, Ambassador of International Relations, Gyeonggi Provincial Government, Dongrok Suh – Deputy Mayor for Economic Planning, Seoul Metropolitan Government, Pramod Saxena – chairman and managing director, Oxygen Services(India) Pvt. Ltd.

=== 2017 Delhi ===
The 2017 edition of the event took place in Delhi, National Capital of India. It introduced some more elements than its previous edition. This edition featured some of the prominent figures and speakers in India from across various fields, such as Politics, Journalism, Bollywood, Entrepreneurs, Business, Literature, Sports and Music. The speakers included some prominent figures such as Arun Shourie, Rajdeep Sardesai, Chetan Bhagat, Satyadev Pachauri, R Gandhi, Rajat Kapoor, Nandita Das, Kalki Koechlin, Deepa Malik, Varun Grover, Anshu Gupta, Laxmi Agarwal, Harish Iyer and Amey Nerkar. The event brought some burning topics in light related to Politics, Indian Cinema, Gender Sensitization, Racism, Law, Humanitarianism, Sports, Agriculture, Knowledge and Education.

=== 2018 ===
On 25 May 2018, Tomorrow's India launched a campaign called "Let's Start with I". The focus of this campaign is on the younger generation to take initiatives to address issues such as Child Labor, Education and Health & Sanitation, for building a better future, which has been the motto of Global Social India Foundation. This campaign was carried on until 25 September 2018. Several other companies like Lenskart, Ferns N Petals etc. joined this campaign by providing special offers to people registering with the campaign.
