= Christopher Gérard =

Belgian writer

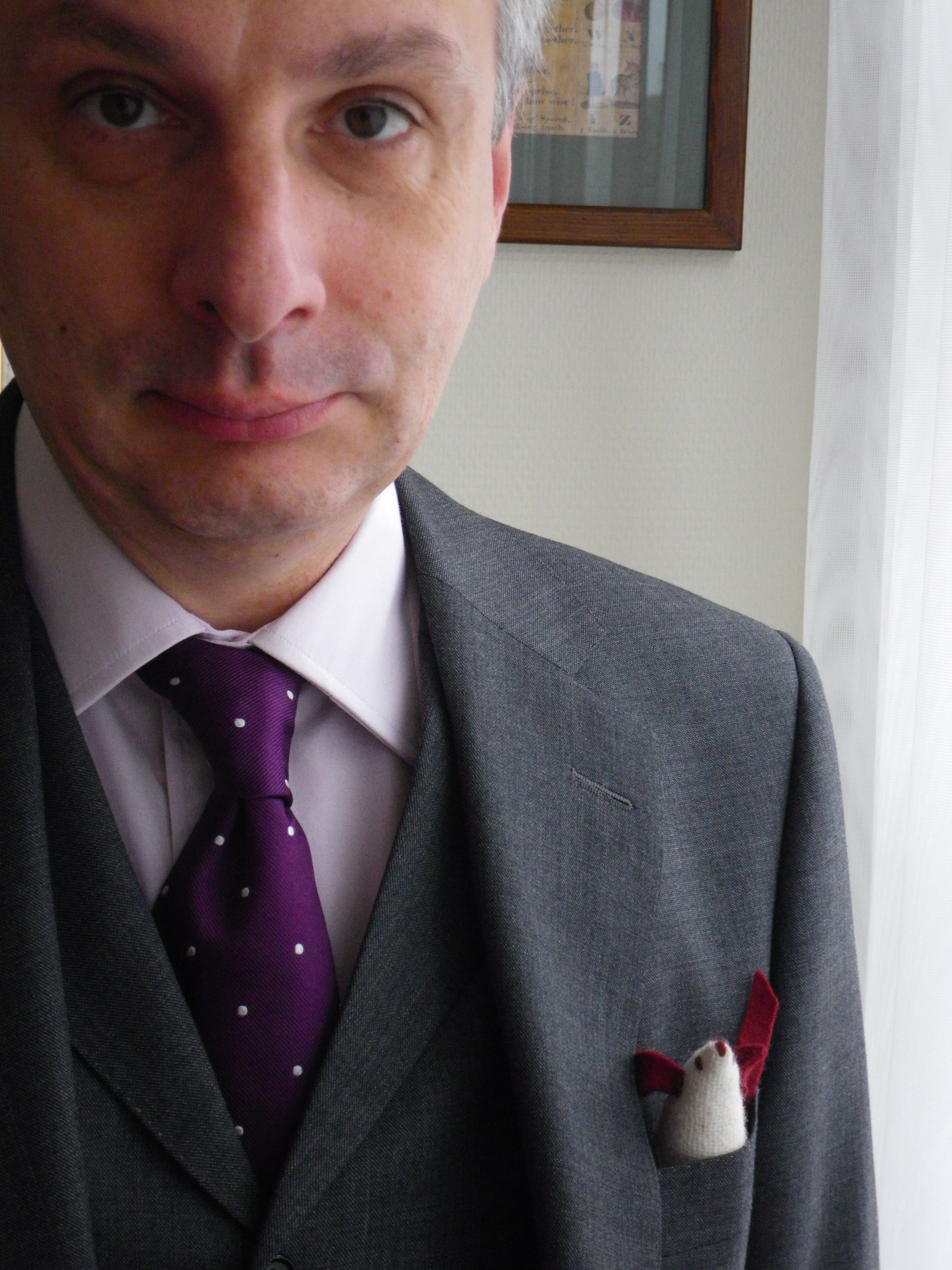
- Gérard in 2012
- Born: 7 July 1962 (age 63); New York City
- Occupations: writer and critic

Christopher Gérard (born 7 July 1962) is a Belgian novelist, publisher and literary critic. He is known as a promoter of modern Paganism, drawing much inspiration from Hinduism, and published the journal Antaios from 1992 to 2001. He has written novels and non-fiction books where paganism and the city of Brussels are recurring elements.

== Early life and education ==
Christopher Gérard was born to an Irish mother and a Belgian father. At age twelve, he was the youngest member of a team of archeologists who searched a Merovingian necropolis in the Ardennes. He studied classical philology at the Université libre de Bruxelles. He became a language teacher by profession.

== Pagan revivalism ==
An important influence on Gérard's religious outlook has been Ram Swarup, a Hindu proponent of a pagan revival in Europe. After developing a correspondence, the two met during Gérard's first visit to India, when Swarup functioned as an introductor of Indian society. During a visit to a Hanuman temple in Delhi, Gérard became convinced that it is possible for contemporary people to practice paganism. The historian of religion Jean-François Mayer has written that Gérard's works ties in with Hindu nationalist appeals for Europeans to use the living Hindu tradition to reconnect to their own paganism, and can be seen as part of the development of a "Western-Hindu 'pagan axis'".

Gérard is critical of the modern pagans who enforce Christian demonization by embracing phenomena such as Satanism and witchcraft. According to Gérard, these practitioners are predominantly American, and he has described their purported connection to pagan religiosity as "a historical hallucination". He criticizes the Wicca movement for what he calls "a consumeristic aspect"; according to Gérard, "certain of these people will present themselves as Druids somewhere in Oregon for six months, then suddenly somewhere else they are Egyptian priests. It is neither profound, nor constructive. It is a parody." He also criticizes those who equate paganism with far-right politics or nationalism. In his book La Source pérenne (2007), he dismisses nationalism as a life-draining, administrative product of the French Revolution, and only writes approvingly about the patriotism that exists on a continental level. The political scientist Stéphane François used Gérard's Parcours païen (2000) and Alain de Benoist's On Being a Pagan (1981) as the two principal books in focus in his 2008 study on the neopagan currents within the Nouvelle Droite.

== Publishing and writing career ==
In 1992, Gérard created and became the editor of the journal Antaios, intended as a continuation of the magazine of the same name which Mircea Eliade and Ernst Jünger edited from 1959 to 1971. The new Antaios existed until 2001 and became the publication of the Société d'Etudes Polythéistes (lit. 'Society for Polytheist Studies'), founded in 1998.

Gérard has written a French translation of Emperor Julian's Against the Galilaeans, published in 1995. He lays out his approach to faith and ethics in the books Parcours païen and La Source pérenne, and has written several novels which reflect his religious views. His debut novel from 2003, Le Songe d’Empédocle, is set in Belgium, Delphi, Rome and India, and concerns a man, loosely based on Gérard himself, who discovers a secret society which has kept paganism alive in Europe.

In 2009, Gérard was awarded the Prix Félix Denayer from the ARLLFB for the book Aux Armes de Bruxelles. The book is about the city of Brussels, with a focus on cafés and tea houses, but also on architecture, parks and culture. The jury wrote that it was surprised by the author's departure from his usual style and subjects, but that the prize was "as much for one particular work as for all of them together". Porte Louise (2010) and Vogelsang ou la Mélancolie du vampire (2012) are novels set in Brussels, the first a murder mystery and the second a vampire story. Le Prince d'Aquitaine (2018), a personal novel about a destructive father, received the special Grand Prix of the magazine L'Incorrect.

== Awardas ==
- 2003: E. Martin Prize from the A.E.B. for Le Songe d'Empédocle.
- 2009: Félix Denayer Prize from the Royal Academy of French Language and Literature for Aux Armes de Bruxelles.
- 2012: Indications Prize for the best novel, for Vogelsang ou la mélancolie du vampire.
- 2018: Special Grand Prize from L'Incorrect for Le Prince d'Aquitaine.

== Bibliography ==
- Julian, Contre les Galiléens, translation and commentary, Ousia, 1995.
- Parcours païen, non-fiction, L'Âge d'Homme, 2000.
- Le Songe d'Empédocle, novel, L'Âge d'Homme, 2003. Prix E. Martin de l'A.E.B.
- Maugis, novel, L'Âge d’Homme, 2005; revised edition: Pierre-Guillaume de Roux, 2020.
- La Source pérenne, non-fiction, L'Âge d'Homme, 2007.
- Aux Armes de Bruxelles, non-fiction, L'Âge d'Homme, 2009. Prix Félix Denayer.
- Porte Louise, novel, L'Âge d'Homme, 2010.
- "Voluptueux et stoïque. La face païenne de Montherlant", Montherlant aujourd'hui, vu par 15 écrivains et hommes de théâtre, non-fiction, Editions de Paris, 2012.
- Vogelsang ou la mélancolie du vampire, novel, L'Âge d'Homme, 2012. Prix Indications.
- Quolibets. Journal de lectures, literary criticism, L'Âge d'Homme, 2013.
- Osbert & autres historiettes, short stories, L'Âge d'Homme, 2014.
- Le Prince d'Aquitaine, novel, Pierre-Guillaume de Roux, 2018. Special Grand Prix of L'Incorrect.
- Les Nobles Voyageurs. Journal de lectures, literary criticism, La Nouvelle Librairie, 2023.

== See also ==
- Hinduism in the West
- Alain Daniélou
- Koenraad Elst
