= Sunil Jain =

Indian journalist (1963–2021)

- Born: 1963
- Died: 15 May 2021 (aged 58); New Delhi, India
- Education: Delhi School of Economics; St. Columba's School
- Occupations: Financial and economics journalist

Sunil Jain (1963 – 15 May 2021) was an Indian financial journalist associated with Indian print media including The Indian Express, Business Standard and The Financial Express. His focus spanned regulation, state policy interventions and industries including oil and gas, power, and telecommunications. He was the managing editor of the Financial Express at the time of his death.

== Biography ==
Jain did his schooling from St. Columba's School, Delhi. He was a graduate with a master's degree in economics from the Delhi School of Economics which he obtained in 1986. He started his career as a market survey consultant working on technical and economic feasibility studies. He later joined the Federation of Indian Chambers of Commerce & Industry where he was responsible for the industry body's export policy desk.

He started his career as a financial journalist with the India Today magazine in 1991 and later went on to become the business editor at The Indian Express. He had also held senior editorial roles at the Business Standard. He became the managing editor of The Financial Express in 2013 and held that position until his death in 2021. He was credited with managing the newspaper's circulation and readership in what was considered a competitive market. During this period, he also brought in respected columnists and an younger demographic of reporters.

His column in the Financial Express, titled Rational Expectations focused on macroeconomic topics at the intersection of state policy interventions, regulations, and industry including oil and gas, power, and telecom. He spoke against regulatory capture and was a critic of actions by India's telecom and power sector regulators including being a critic of India's telecom policy. He also wrote about the policy errors of the government in handling the COVID-19 pandemic while defending the government's farm sector reforms and linked policies.

Jain died on 15 May 2021, from COVID-19 at the All India Institutes of Medical Sciences in New Delhi. He was admitted to the hospital earlier on 3 May 2021. He was aged 58. The prime minister of India, Narendra Modi, the president of India, Ram Nath Kovind, and the finance minister of India, Nirmala Sitharaman were amongst those who expressed their condolences.

Jain was the son of Girilal Jain who was the editor of Indian English language daily, The Times of India, between 1978 and 1988.

== Published works ==
- Jain, Sunil; Shukla, R. K.; Kakkar, Preeti (2010). Caste in a Different Mould: Understanding the Discrimination. Business Standard Books. ISBN 978-81-905735-9-7.
- Jain, Sunil; Ninan, T. N. (2010). Servicing India's GDP growth (PDF). Oxford University Press. pp. 328–365. ISBN 9780198074953.
- Jain, Sunil (2004). The Great Indian Middle Class. National Council of Applied Economic Research and Business Standard Limited. ISBN 81-88830-04-6.
