= 5C Network =

Indian teleradiology company

- Company type: Private
- Industry: Health technology; Teleradiology
- Founded: 2014 in Bengaluru, India
- Founders: Kalyan Sivasailam; Syed S. Ahmed
- Headquarters: Bengaluru, India
- Area served: India
- Key people: Kalyan Sivasailam (CEO); Syed S. Ahmed (Director); Anand Iyer (COO)

5C Network is a health technology company, with its headquarters in Bengaluru, that operates a teleradiology network. It runs a cloud-based platform that routes medical imaging from hospitals and diagnostic centres to remote radiologists for diagnostic reporting.

== History ==
5C Network was founded by Kalyan Sivasailam and Syed S. Ahmed as an online medical diagnostics platform connecting hospitals and diagnostic centres with a network of radiologists. According to the company, its name refers to five participants it aims to connect: patients, physicians, radiologists, hospitals, and artificial intelligence.

In March 2022, the digital health platform Tata 1mg made a strategic investment in the company for an undisclosed amount. In October 2022, 5C Network raised about US$4.6 million in a Series A round led by Celesta Capital, with participation from Unitus Ventures and Axilor Ventures. In April 2024, it raised about US$3 million from the Redwood India Healthcare Fund. The startup-data platform Tracxn records total funding of about US$12.1 million. The company has said its platform delivers radiology reports to about 2,000 hospitals and diagnostic centres across roughly 300 cities in India.

During the COVID-19 pandemic, 5C Network worked with the Defence Research and Development Organisation's Centre for Artificial Intelligence and Robotics (CAIR) and HCG Academics to develop ATMAN AI, an algorithm for screening chest X-rays for findings associated with COVID-19. CAIR-DRDO reported that the algorithm achieved an accuracy of 96.73 per cent on a validation dataset of RT-PCR-positive hospitalised patients.

== Acquisitions and partnerships ==
In February 2023, 5C Network acquired Krayen, a healthtech company based in California that used computer vision and natural language processing, for an undisclosed amount.

In January 2026, 5C Network and BPL Medical Technologies announced a partnership to develop BPL Cortex, an AI-enabled digital radiography product that integrates 5C Network's image-analysis software into BPL's X-ray hardware. The companies described it as the first original equipment manufacturer-embedded artificial intelligence of its kind within an imaging system in India. It was shown at the 78th annual conference of the Indian Radiological and Imaging Association in Hyderabad.
