= Rakesh Sinha =

Indian academic and former nominated member of the Rajya Sabha

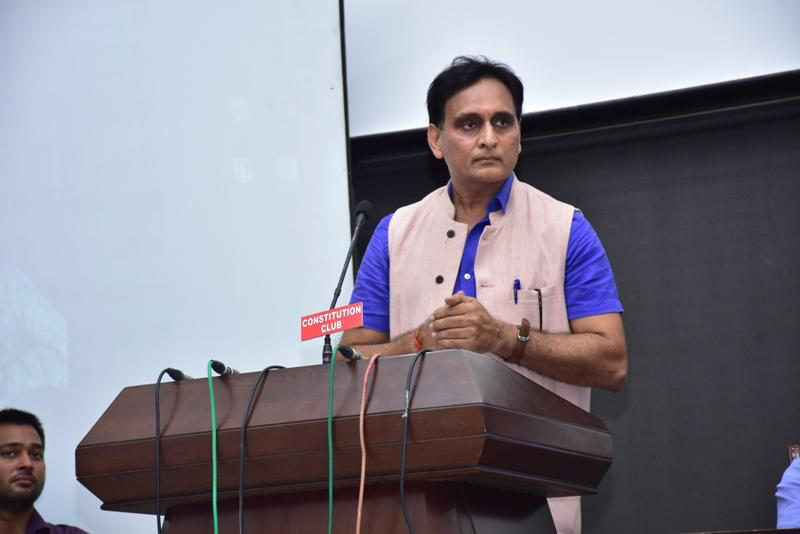
- Sinha in New Delhi, 2019

Member of Rajya Sabha (nominated)
- In office 14 July 2018 – 13 July 2024
- Constituency: Nominated

Personal details
- Born: September 5, 1964 (age 62) Manserpur, Begusarai district, Bihar, India
- Party: Bharatiya Janata Party
- Education: University of Delhi (BA, MA, MPhil, PhD)
- Occupation: Academic, politician

Rakesh Sinha (born 5 September 1964) is an Indian academic and politician who served as a nominated member of the Rajya Sabha, the upper house of the Parliament of India, from 14 July 2018 to 13 July 2024. An ideologue of the Rashtriya Swayamsevak Sangh (RSS), he has written positively on the organisation, and has authored a government-published biography of K. B. Hedgewar.

== Early life and education ==
Sinha was born on 5 September 1964 in Manserpur, Begusarai district, Bihar. He studied political science at the University of Delhi (BA, MA, MPhil, PhD). Public parliamentary records list his highest qualification as Doctorate.

== Academic career ==
Sinha has taught political science at Motilal Nehru College (Evening), University of Delhi.

== Political career ==
On 14 July 2018, Sinha was nominated to the Rajya Sabha under Article 80(1)(a) of the Constitution for a six-year term; the term ended on 13 July 2024. During his tenure he introduced several private members’ bills, including the Public Credit Registry of India Bill, 2019 (introduced 6 December 2019; lapsed at the end of term), the Terminated Employees (Welfare) Bill, 2020 (introduced 7 February 2020; lapsed), and the Population Regulation Bill, 2019 (introduced 12 July 2019; withdrawn on 1 April 2022).

In April 2021, during the COVID-19 surge in Delhi, Sinha publicly urged the Union government to impose President’s Rule in the National Capital Territory; the remarks were reported by national outlets.

In July 2025, historian Meenakshi Jain was among four individuals nominated to the Rajya Sabha.

== Positions and views ==
Sinha writes opinion columns in The Indian Express on constitutional and historical topics; these pieces are used only to attribute his own views. Positions expressed in interviews or op-eds include:

- Advocacy during the pandemic for temporary central intervention in Delhi under Article 239AB (President’s Rule).

== Works ==
In Understanding RSS (2019), Sinha presents a defence of the organisation and argues that it has been misrepresented by critics.

=== Books (selected) ===
- Sinha, Rakesh (2015). Dr. Keshav Baliram Hedgewar. Builders of Modern India. New Delhi: Publications Division, Ministry of Information & Broadcasting, Government of India. ISBN 978-81-230-1986-4.
- Sinha, Rakesh (2019). Understanding RSS. New Delhi: Har-Anand Publications. ISBN 978-93-88409-10-0.

=== Parliamentary (private members’ bills) ===
- The Public Credit Registry of India Bill, 2019 — introduced in the Rajya Sabha on 6 December 2019 (lapsed 13 July 2024).
- The Terminated Employees (Welfare) Bill, 2020 — introduced in the Rajya Sabha on 7 February 2020 (lapsed 13 July 2024).
- The Population Regulation Bill, 2019 — introduced 12 July 2019; withdrawn 1 April 2022.
