= Thyrocare =

Indian medical diagnostic company

Thyrocare Technologies Ltd.
- Company type: Public company
- Traded as: BSE: 539871; NSE: THYROCARE
- Industry: Healthcare
- Founded: 1996; 30 years ago
- Founder: A. Velumani
- Headquarters: Navi Mumbai, Maharashtra, India
- Number of locations: 1,122 outlets (2021)
- Area served: India; Nepal; Bangladesh; Middle East
- Key people: Rahul Guha (Chairman, CEO and MD)
- Revenue: ▲₹618 crore (US$64 million) (FY22)
- Operating income: ▲₹228 crore (US$24 million) (FY22)
- Net income: ▲₹176 crore (US$18 million) (FY22)
- Owner: API Holdings (66.1%)
- Number of employees: 2,000+ (2021)
- Parent: API Holdings
- Website: www.thyrocare.com

Thyrocare Technologies Limited is an Indian multinational chain of diagnostic and preventive care laboratories, headquartered in Navi Mumbai. As of 2021, the company has a total of 1,122 outlets and collection centers across India and parts of Nepal, Bangladesh and the Middle East.

On 26 June 2021, Indian e-pharmacy and online healthcare aggregator PharmEasy's parent API Holdings acquired a 66.1% controlling stake in Thyrocare, making Thyrocare the first Indian listed company to be acquired by a startup.

== History ==
Old logo of Thyrocare

Thyrocare was started in 1996, by A. Velumani, a former scientist at Bhabha Atomic Research Centre (BARC) in Mumbai. The first laboratory was set up in Byculla, Mumbai, with an initial focus on thyroid testing. The laboratory was later shifted to a larger set-up, its main headquarters and central processing laboratory at Navi Mumbai. The company introduced a franchisee model for procuring samples to be sent for testing at their central laboratory in Mumbai.

In 2010, Thyrocare raised its first private equity funding of ₹188 crore from New Delhi-based CX Partners in exchange for a 30% stake. It set up a subsidiary, Nuclear Healthcare Limited, which uses PET-CT to detect and locate cancerous cells.

In 2014, Siemens Healthcare's diagnostic division installed its world's largest laboratory automation track – Aptio Automation – at its laboratory in Mumbai.

In April 2016, Thyrocare made its initial public offering (IPO), and became the second diagnostic firm in India to be listed on BSE and NSE.

In 2021, PharmEasy parent API Holdings acquired a 66.1% stake in Thyrocare.

In 2023, Thyrocare integrated AI-based devices to automate manual microscopy across its network with SigTuple's AI100.

== Services ==
Thyrocare initially started with thyroid testing but now has more than 350 tests and packages, along with 83 odd profiles comprising different tests for preventive care and wellness under its brand Aarogyam. During the peak of COVID-19 pandemic, Thyrocare carried out more than 8 lakh tests per month. Thyrocare's 68% of business comes from the DSA model to promote its services.

== Controversies ==
In April 2020, Brihanmumbai Municipal Corporation issued a show cause notice to Thyrocare over lapses in its testing of COVID-19 samples and ordered the company to stop testing as "incomplete or wrong information about patients were found in the reports". In May 2020, Panvel Municipal Corporation ordered Thyrocare to stop testing samples in Panvel city limits as the lab was producing false positive reports. In June 2020, the Navi Mumbai Municipal Corporation demanded cancellation of Thyrocare's registration after discrepancies in the lab's report led to a patient's death, while Thane Municipal Corporation banned Thyrocare in the city for producing false positive reports. In July 2020, a Thyrocare lab in Pune was banned from conducting COVID-19 tests after producing false positive reports.
