= Hindu Temples: What Happened to Them =

Book by Sita Ram Goel

Hindu Temples – What Happened to Them
- Author: Sita Ram Goel; Arun Shourie; Harsh Narain; Jay Dubashi; Ram Swarup
- Language: English
- Subject: Hinduism
- Genre: Non-fiction
- Publication date: 1991
- Publication place: India
- ISBN: 81-85990-49-2 (Volume 1); ISBN 81-85990-03-4 (Volume 2)
- OCLC: 41002522
- LC Class: DS422.C64 H562 1998

Hindu Temples: What Happened to Them is a two-volume book by Sita Ram Goel, Arun Shourie, Harsh Narain, Jay Dubashi and Ram Swarup. The first volume was published in the Spring of 1990.

== Contents ==
The first volume includes a list of 2,000 mosques that the authors claim had been built on top of the location of Hindu temples, based primarily on the books of Muslim historians of the period or inscriptions found on mosques. The second volume excerpts from medieval histories and chronicles and from inscriptions concerning the destruction of Hindu, Jain and Buddhist temples. The authors claim that the material presented in the book as "the tip of an iceberg".

The book contains chapters about the Ayodhya debate. The appendix of the first volume contains a list of temple-destructions and atrocities that the authors claim took place in Bangladesh in 1989. The book also criticizes "Marxist historians", and one of the appendices of the second volume includes a questionnaire for "Marxist professors", one of whom was an Indian historian Romila Thapar.

== Reception ==
Cynthia Talbot, writing in 1995 about religious identities in pre-modern India, noted temple desecration to have been on the rise in Andhra Pradesh only since the late sixteenth century—while such a statistic did hold true for Goel's too, she cautioned that his estimates were "largely inflated" as a result of his uncritical reliance upon Perso-Arabic chronicles and inscriptions. Scholar Romila Thapar has criticized Goel's list, arguing that he does not understand how to read historical sources contextually.

== See also ==
- Muslim conquests in the Indian subcontinent
- Conversion of non-Islamic places of worship into mosques
