= Ram Swarup =

Indian Hindutva author (1920–1998)

- Born: 12 October 1920; Sonipat, Haryana, India
- Died: 26 December 1998 (aged 77)
- Education: University of Delhi
- Occupations: Historian; Writer; publisher
- Writing career
- Period: Late 20th century
- Genres: History, Politics, Comparative Religion
- Subjects: Hinduism, Dharmic traditions, British Imperialism

Ram Swarup (12 October 1920 – 26 December 1998), born Ram Swarup Agarwal, was an Indian Hindutva author.

== Life ==
Ram Swarup was born in 1920 to a banker father in Sonipat, now a part of the state of Haryana in the Garg gotra of the merchant Agrawal caste. He graduated with a degree in economics from Delhi University in 1941. He started the Changer's Club in 1944, members of which included Lakshmi Chand Jain, Raj Krishna, Girilal Jain and Sita Ram Goel. In 1948–49, he worked for Mahatma Gandhi's disciple Mira Behn (Madeleine Slade).

Swarup wrote a book on the Communist Party that was published under an assumed name. In 1949, he founded the Society for the Defence of Freedom in Asia. The Society published books, reviewed in the West, that criticised both the Presidium of the Supreme Soviet-mouthpiece Izvestia as well as Pravda, another mouthpiece for that same foreign power's Communist Party. The Society for the Defence of Freedom in Asia ceased operations in 1955. His early book Gandhism and Communism from around this time had some influence among American policymakers and members of Congress. Swarup also wrote for mainstream Indian weeklies and dailies, like the Telegraph, The Times of India, Indian Express, Observer of Business and Politics, Hindustan Times and Hinduism Today.

In 1982, Swarup founded the publishing house Voice of India, which has published works by Harsh Narain, A. K. Chatterjee, K.S. Lal, Koenraad Elst, Rajendra Singh, Sant R.S. Nirala and Shrikant Talageri, among others.

== Views ==
=== Hinduism ===
Ram Swarup upheld the polytheistic interpretation of the Vedas by rejecting the concept of one God, and states that, "only some form of polytheism alone can do justice to this variety and richness."

Swarup was influenced by Sri Aurobindo, whom he held to be the greatest exponent of the Vedic vision in our times.

Ram Swarup was "most responsible for reviving and re-popularizing" the Hindu 'critique' of Christian missionary practices in the 1980s, according to Chad Bauman. He insisted that monotheistic religions like Christianity "nurtured among their adherents a lack of respect for other religions". In the 1980s, he and Goel were involved in a "vigorous debate" with the Christian Ashram movement represented by Bede Griffiths. Swarup has been named one of the most important thought leaders of the Hindu revivalist movement.

=== European paganism ===
Swarup also had an interest in European Neopaganism, and corresponded with Prudence Jones (chairperson of Pagan Federation) and the Pagan author Guðrún Kristín Magnúsdóttir. Under the influence of Ram Swarup, other Hindu revivalists also took an interest in European paganism.

Christopher Gérard (editor of Antaios, Society for Polytheistic Studies) said: "Ram Swarup was the perfect link between Hindu Renaissance and renascent Paganism in the West and elsewhere."

Swarup has also advocated a "Pagan renaissance" in Europe, saying

Europe became sick because it tore apart from its own heritage, it had to deny its very roots. If Europe is to be healed spiritually, it must recover its spiritual past—at least, it should not hold it in such dishonor...

He argued that the European Pagans "should compile a directory of Pagan temples destroyed, Pagan groves and sacred spots desecrated. European Pagans should also revive some of these sites as their places of pilgrimage."

== Bibliography ==
- Indictment, Changer's Club
- Mahatma Gandhi and His Assassin, 1948. Changer's Club
- Let us Fight the Communist Menace (1949)
- Russian Imperialism: How to Stop It (1950);
- Communism and Peasantry: Implications of Collectivist Agriculture for Asian Countries (1950,1954)
- Gandhism and Communism (1954)
- Foundations of Maoism (1956). with a foreword by Kodandera M. Cariappa
- Gandhian Economics (1977)
- The Hindu View of Education (1971) Online (PDF)
- The Word as Revelation: Names of Gods (1980), (1982, revised 1992) Online
- Understanding Islam through Hadis (1983 in the US by Arvind Ghosh, Houston; Indian reprint by Voice of India, 1984); The Hindi translation was banned in 1990, and the English original was banned in 1991 in India. Online, other source
- Buddhism vis-à-vis Hinduism (1958, revised 1984).
- Hinduism vis-à-vis Christianity and Islam (1982, revised 1992)
- Woman in Islam (1994);
- Hindu View of Christianity and Islam (1993, contains also as an appendix Swarup's foreword to D. S. Margoliouth's Mohammed and the Rise of Islam (1985, original in 1905) and to William Muir's The Life of Mahomet (1992, original in 1894) Online
- Ramakrishna Mission: Search for a New Identity (1986) Online
- Cultural Alienation and Some Problems Hinduism Faces (1987)
- Hindu-Sikh Relationship (1985) Online (PDF)
- Hindu-Buddhist Rejoinder to Pope John-Paul II on Eastern Religions and Yoga (1995)
- Hinduism and monotheistic religions. (2015). ISBN 9788185990842
- On Hinduism: Reviews and reflections. New Delhi: Voice of India. Online ISBN 9788185990620 (2000).

Writings as a contributor

- Christianity, an Imperialist Ideology (1983, with Major T.R. Vedantham and Sita Ram Goel)
- Chapters Five and Six in Hindu Temples - What Happened to Them (1990 vol.1, with Arun Shourie and others, ISBN 81-85990-49-2 )
- Foreword to a republication of D.S. Margoliouth's Mohammed and the Rise of Islam (1985, original in 1905)
- Foreword to a republication of William Muir's The Life of Mahomet (1992, original in 1894)
- Foreword to Anirvan: Inner Yoga (1988, reprint 1995)

Writings in other languages

- Hindu Dharma, Isaiat aur Islam (1985, Hindi: "Hindu Dharma, Christianity and Islam");
- Foi et intolérance: Un regard hindou sur le christianisme et l'Islam (2000). Paris: Le Labyrinthe.
