= PharmEasy =

Indian online healthcare company

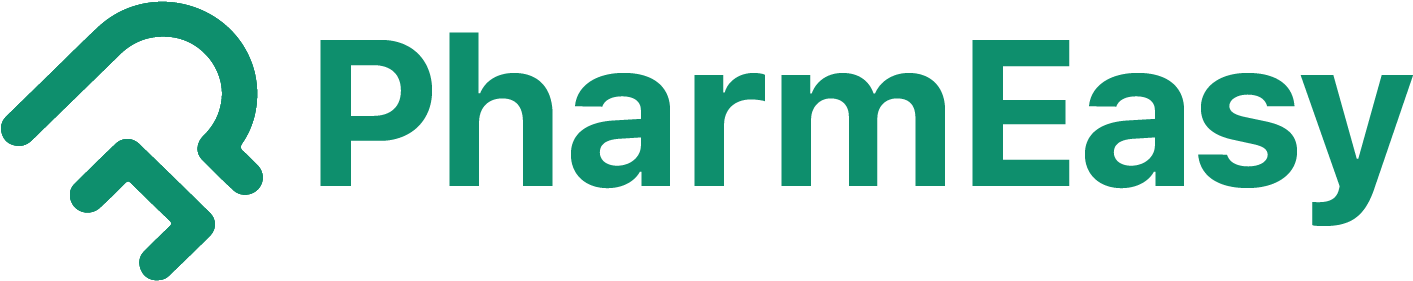
- Company Logo
- Company type: Private
- Industry: Healthcare; E-commerce; Information technology; Retail
- Founded: 2015; 10 years ago
- Headquarters: Mumbai, Maharashtra, India
- Number of locations: 1,000+ cities in India (2021)
- Area served: India
- Key people: Shidharth Shah (CEO)
- Services: Medicine delivery Healthcare services
- Revenue: ▼₹5,664 crore (US$670 million) (FY24)
- Net income: ▼₹−2,533 crore (US$−300 million) (FY24)
- Total assets: ▲₹3,476.2 crore (US$410 million) (FY24)
- Number of employees: 4,700+ (2024)
- Website: www.pharmeasy.in

PharmEasy is an Indian e-pharmacy company that sells medicines, diagnostics and telehealth online.

== History ==
The company was founded in 2015 by Dharmil Sheth and Dhaval Shah in Mumbai with the initial seed funding provided by their parents. The company wanted to expand beyond the Mumbai market and received their Series A funding.

In May 2021, PharmEasy acquired rival e-pharmacy company Medlife for an undisclosed amount. In June 2021, the company acquired a 66.1% stake in diagnostics chain Thyrocare for ₹4,546 crore (US$613.5 million). In September 2021, it acquired a majority stake in Aknamed, a healthcare supply chain company.

In November 2021, the company filed papers to launch its initial public offering (IPO) of ₹6,250 crore (US$843.46 million). The company withdrew its IPO plans in August 2022.

== Competition ==
PharmEasy competes with other e-pharmacy companies including Netmeds (which was acquired by Reliance Industries), 1mg (acquired by Tata Group), Apollo 24x7 and Amazon Pharmacy. The Ken questioned the company's positioning as a unified healthtech player and referred to the company's story as "more confusing than convincing".

== Criticism ==
=== Medlife–PharmEasy merger protests ===
In 2020, PharmEasy and Medlife were in merger talks which came to the attention of the Competition Commission of India (CCI), which approves such mergers. The merger was protested by The South Chemist and Distributors Association (SCDA), who objected that sales of medicines online was illegal in India. The online sales of medicines was later regulated and the merger was completed in 2021.

=== PharmEasy advertisement ===
Members of the Hindu religion criticized one of the company's advertisements and said that religious sentiments were hurt for the sake of marketing and sales. The advertisement in question showed Lakshman being struck and Ram needing Sanjeevani, asking who will bring the medicine from such a long distance. Two PharmEasy employees arrive by scooter to deliver it.

== See also ==
- Pharmaceutical industry
- Pharmaceutical industry in India
- E-commerce in India
