= India Telecom =

Indian telecom trade show

- Status: Active
- Genre: Telecommunications Expo
- Venue: Pragati Maidan
- Location: New Delhi
- Country: India
- Inaugurated: 2006
- Most recent: 2010
- Organizer: Department of Telecommunications and the Federation of Indian Chambers of Commerce and Industry
- Website: indiatelecom.org

India Telecom is an annual trade show for the telecommunications industry in India. Held at the Pragati Maidan showgrounds in New Delhi in December, 2010 was the fifth edition of the exhibition.

== Exhibition dates ==
- 2009: 3–5 December
- 2010: 9–11 December
- 2011: To be determined
