= Arokiaswamy Velumani =

Indian scientist and entrepreneur (born 1959)

A. Velumani
- Born: 12 April 1959 (age 67); Coimbatore, Madras State (present day Tamil Nadu), India
- Education: Bachelor of Science; Master of Science; Doctor of Philosophy
- Alma mater: University of Madras; University of Mumbai
- Occupations: Entrepreneur; Scientist; Philanthropist; Public speaker
- Known for: Founder of Thyrocare Technologies Limited
- Spouse: Sumathi Velumani (m. 1986; died 2016)
- Children: Anand Velumani (born 1989); Amruta Velumani (born 1991)
- Parents: Arokiaswamy; Sayammal
- Website: velumani.com

Dr. Arokiaswamy Velumani (born 12 April 1959) is an Indian billionaire entrepreneur. He is the founder of Thyrocare Technologies Ltd. a chain of diagnostic and preventive care laboratories headquartered in Navi Mumbai. He is the founder of Nueclear Healthcare Limited, a radiology diagnostics company affiliated to Thyrocare.

== Early life ==
Velumani was born on 12 April 1959 to a landless farmer in the village of Appanaickenpatti Pudur, near Coimbatore in Coimbatore district of the erstwhile Madras State. His father was a farmer and his mother was a housewife, who took up rearing buffaloes and selling their milk to sustain the family. Velumani studied at Sri Venkateswara High School, Appanaickenpatti Pudur. He obtained his B.Sc. from Sri Ramakrishna Mission Vidyalaya College of Arts and Science, Coimbatore, affiliated to the University of Madras in 1978 at age 19. He earned a master's degree in 1985 and later a doctoral degree in Thyroid Biochemistry in 1995 from the University of Mumbai while working with Bhabha Atomic Research Centre (BARC), a nuclear research facility based in Mumbai, Maharashtra.

== Career ==
After graduating in 1978, Velumani began with a job in 1979 at Gemini Capsules, a small pharmaceutical company in Coimbatore, Tamil Nadu as a shift chemist. After three years, the company was shut down. He then joined Bhabha Atomic Research Centre (BARC) first as a laboratory assistant, staying for 14 years. During this time he pursued his master's and doctoral degree and rose to the rank of scientist. He later was posted at the Radiation Medicine Centre (RMC), a BARC department at Tata Memorial Hospital in Parel, Mumbai, Maharashtra.

Velumani decided to set up his own thyroid testing laboratory, Thyrocare, in 1996. He introduced a franchisee model in his diagnostic laboratory and offered affordable testing services. Thyrocare expanded from testing for thyroid disorders to preventive medical checkups and other diagnostic blood tests.

Under his leadership Thyrocare became the largest thyroid testing laboratory, with a network of more than 1000 outlets across India, Nepal, Bangladesh and the Middle East. In April 2016, Thyrocare conducted its Initial Public Offer (IPO) release, achieving over-subscription of 72.86 times.

Velumani is the founder and managing director of Nueclear Healthcare Ltd. a radiology diagnostics company with its main branch at Navi Mumbai, Maharashtra. This project offers cancer-related imaging services at half the cost of other providers.

== Personal life ==
During his working career at BARC at age 27, Velumani married Sumathi, daughter of J. K. Rao and Sarala Rao. Sumathi was working with the State Bank of India until the couple decided to leave their jobs to start Thyrocare. The couple have two children. Sumathi Velumani was diagnosed with pancreatic cancer in October 2015 and died on 13 February 2016 at age 55.
