= Medlife =

Indian online medical provider

Medlife International Pvt Ltd
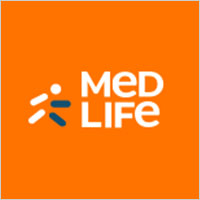
- Type: Private
- Industry: Healthcare; E-commerce; Information technology; Retail
- Founded: 2014
- Founders: Prashant Singh; Tushar Kumar
- Defunct: 2021
- Fate: Merged with PharmEasy
- Successor: PharmEasy
- Headquarters: Bangalore, Karnataka, India
- Area served: India
- Services: Online Pharmacy; Diagnostics; E-consultations
- Revenue: ▲₹363.4 crore (US$38 million) (FY 2019)
- Number of employees: 5000
- Parent: PharmEasy (100%)
- Subsidiaries: Medlife Diagnostics (MedLabz); PinHealth; Medlife Xpress (MyraMed)
- Website: www.medlife.com

Medlife was an Indian online platform, which provided pharmacy, diagnostics, and e-consultation in India. It was founded in 2014 by Prashant Singh and Tushar Kumar. The company had a central laboratory based in Bangalore and operated in 29 states. In 2021, PharmEasy acquired Medlife, and merged Medlife's operations into its own platform.

== History ==
The company started out as an online platform for medicine delivery and later expanded to offer online doctor consultation and diagnostic services. Medlife offered one consumer-facing mobile app for accessing all three services.

Founding team Saurabh Mittal (CTO), Saurabh Agarwal (CFO) and Raghunandan Sreenivasan (COO) led the company to over $150M ARR within four years of incorporation.

In November 2018, Medlife acquired healthcare start-up EClinic to expand Medlife's e-consultation services and enhance online doctor access.

Medlife’s diagnostic services were still in their early stages, primarily offering lab tests and limited home sample collection. In January 2019, Medlife strategically acquired MedLabz, a three-year-old digital healthcare startup providing diagnostic and AI-driven health services, operating in 120 cities. MedLabz was founded by IIT Bombay and IIT Delhi alumni, including Harshal Jain, Kumar Akarsh, Piyush Singh, Srikanth Kumar Manne, Nimish Mehta, and Siddharth Bidwan (Founding CEO).

In May 2019, Medlife acquired MyraMed, a medicine-delivery startup to boost its medicine delivery service and expand its logistics network.

In August 2019, Ananth Narayanan (former CEO of Myntra) joined Medlife as the Co-Founder and Chief Executive Officer.

According to a Frost and Sullivan report Medlife owns 30 per cent of the e-Pharma market share in India.

In May 2020, Medlife became multilingual, offering services in Hindi.

In May 2021, Medlife was acquired reportedly for $250 million by PharmEasy, as a result of which Medlife's operations were discontinued and users were migrated to PharmEasy. The merger made PharmEasy the largest e-pharmacy company in India with 2 million customers.

== Funding ==
Medlife received roughly $30 million from Alkem Laboratories' Family Office. Kumar and Singh also claim to have put $20 million of personal funds into the business.

In April 2019, Medlife received $17 million in funding from Kumar's family trust.

In December 2019, Medlife raised $15.5 million from Wilson Global Opportunities Fund in debt funding.
