= Arun Shourie =

Indian economist, journalist and politician (born 1941)

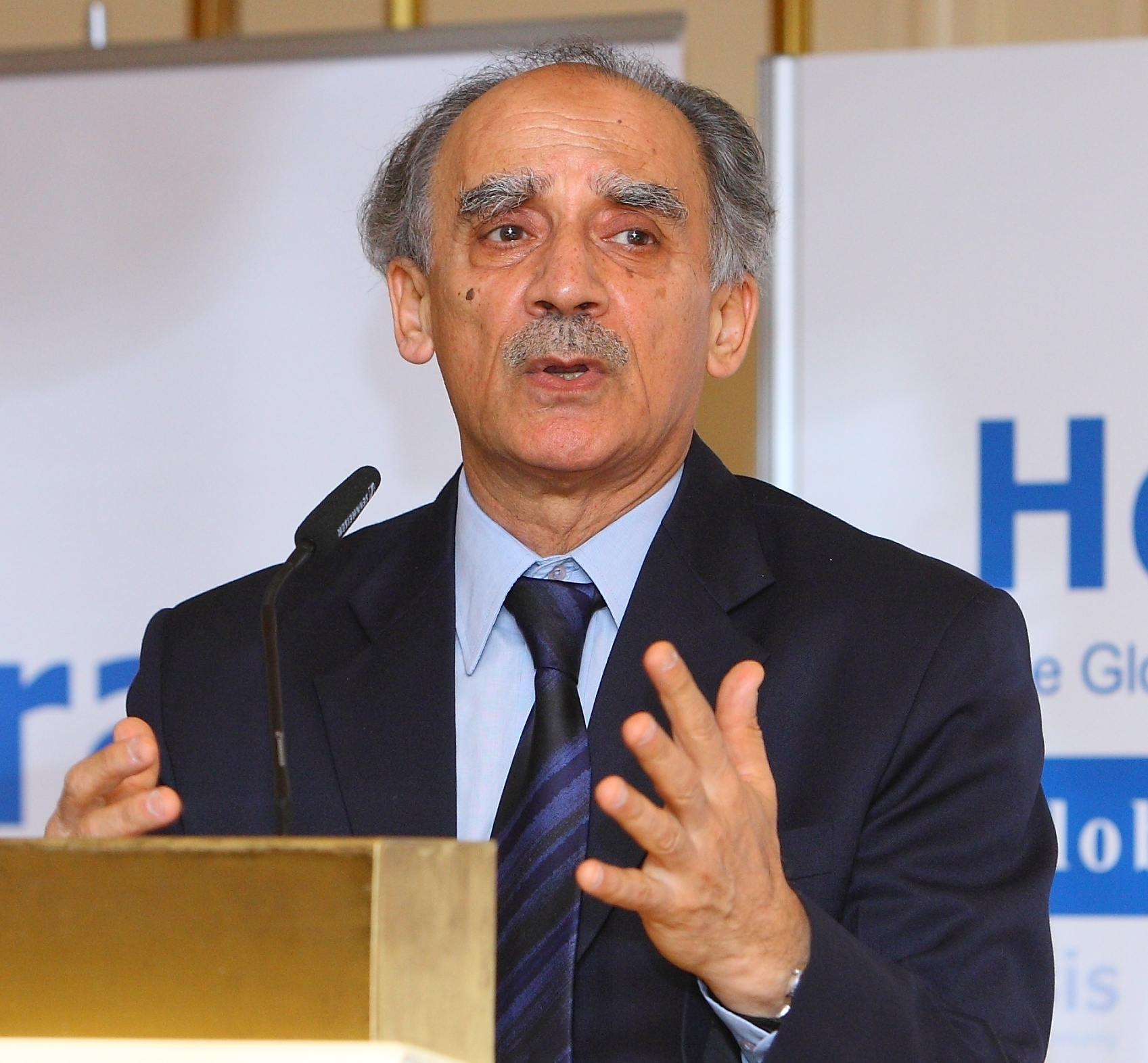
- Shourie in 2009

Minister of Communications and Information Technology
- In office 29 January 2003 – 22 May 2004
- Prime Minister: Atal Bihari Vajpayee
- Preceded by: Pramod Mahajan
- Succeeded by: Dayanidhi Maran

Minister of Commerce & Industry
- In office 9 November 2002 – 29 January 2003
- Prime Minister: Atal Bihari Vajpayee
- Preceded by: Murasoli Maran
- Succeeded by: Arun Jaitley

Minister of Development of North Eastern Region
- In office 1 September 2001 – 29 January 2003
- Prime Minister: Atal Bihari Vajpayee
- Preceded by: Ministry created
- Succeeded by: C. P. Thakur

Member of Parliament, Rajya Sabha
- In office 5 July 1998 – 4 July 2010
- Constituency: Uttar Pradesh

Personal details
- Born: 2 November 1941 (age 84) Jalandhar, Punjab, British India (now in Punjab, India)
- Party: Bharatiya Janata Party
- Spouse: Anita Shourie
- Relations: H. D. Shourie, (father); Nalini Singh, (sister); Deepak Shourie (brother)
- Children: 1
- Education: University of Delhi (BA); Syracuse University (PhD)
- Profession: Journalist and former World Bank Economist; Politician
- Awards: Padma Bhushan (1990); Ramon Magsaysay Award (1982)
- Website: Arun Shourie Blog

Arun Shourie (born 2 November 1941) is an Indian economist, investigative journalist, newspaper editor, author and politician. He has worked as an economist with the World Bank, a consultant to the Planning Commission of India, editor of the Indian Express and The Times of India and a Minister of Communications and Information Technology in the Vajpayee Ministry (1998–2004). During the Emergency period, through his investigative reporting, he wrote extensively against the Indira Gandhi Government, exposing censorship, corruption and human rights violations; later when Ramnath Goenka made him the editor of The Indian Express he wrote extensively exposing corruption, this won him the Ramon Magsaysay Award in 1982, and the Padma Bhushan in 1990. He was awarded the prestigious International Editor of the Year Award in 1982, given by World Press Review, New York.

Popularly perceived as one of the main Hindu nationalist intellectuals during the 90s and early 2000s, for instance writing controversial works on Islam and Christianity apart from attacks on left-wing ideologues, he considers himself skeptical of religions, especially the concept of the organised religion.

== Early life and education ==
Arun Shourie was born in Jalandhar, British India, on 2 November 1941. He is the son of H. D. Shourie (1911–2005), who was a well-known consumer activist in India, who founded NGO, Common Cause. He was an IAS officer and served in various departments, including as Deputy Commissioner of Rohtak. The Government of India awarded Hari Dev Shourie the Padma Bhushan and the Padma Vibhushan, the third- and second-highest civilian awards. Hari Dev Shourie was also named on the People of the Year by the Limca Book of Records.

Shourie did his schooling at Modern School, Barakhamba, and received a bachelor's in Economics(H) from St. Stephen's College, Delhi. He then obtained his doctorate in economics from Maxwell School of Citizenship and Public Affairs at Syracuse University in 1966.

== Personal life ==
Shourie is married to Anita, and they have a son, Adita (b. 1975) who was born with cerebral palsy. His sister is the journalist Nalini Singh, and brother Deepak Shourie is Managing Director Discovery Communication, India. Arun Shourie speaks about his personal life and reviews his life events as case diaries. "My writing is like the case diary of an advocate, which is aimed at winning a case" and his opinions on journalism. Both his parents, HD Shourie and Dayawanti Devasher, died by euthanasia, in 2004 and 2005. Later in life, his wife developed Parkinson's disease, and the couple shifted to Lavasa, Maharashtra, in the 2020s.

He is skeptical of religions, especially the concept of organised religion. He shared his life experiences in the 2011 book Does He Know a Mother's Heart: How Suffering Refutes Religion. In his 2020-book Preparing for Death, he wrote about dealing with mortality, and added that others can approach this eventuality by looking at the examples of Ramakrishna Paramahamsa, Gautama Buddha, Ramana Maharshi, Mahatma Gandhi and Vinoba Bhave.

== Career ==
=== Economist ===
Shortly after receiving a PhD in economics from Syracuse University Shourie joined the World Bank as an economist in 1967 where he worked for more than 10 years. Simultaneously, between 1972 and 1974, he was a consultant to the Indian Planning Commission (Third) and Homi Bhabha Fellow (1972-1974), and it was around this time that he began writing articles as a journalist, criticising economic policy.

=== Journalism ===
In 1975, during The Emergency imposed by then prime minister, Indira Gandhi, Shourie began writing for the Indian Express in opposition to what he saw as an attack on civil liberties. The newspaper, owned by Ramnath Goenka, was a focal point for the government's efforts at censorship. He became a fellow of the Indian Council of Social Science Research (ICSSR) in 1976-78. In January 1979, Goenka appointed Shourie as executive editor of the newspaper, giving him a carte blanche to do with it as he saw fit. He developed a reputation as an intelligent, fearless writer and editor who campaigned for freedom of the press, exposed corruption and defended civil liberties. Most notably, in 1982, his anti-corruption exposé campaign and reportage led to the resignation of A. R. Antulay, Chief Minister of Maharashtra. When President R. Venkatraman tried to protect Indira Gandhi saying the she was unaware of the trust Indira Gandhi Pratibha Pratishthan, used to collect bribes up to Rs 5 crores in the case, he famously published a photo of Indira Gandhi signing the trust papers in the Indian Express, with headline: You are a liar, Mr Venkatraman.

Influenced by Gandhian ideals, Shourie has been called a "veteran journalist". Shourie was a winner of the Ramon Magsaysay Award in 1982, in the Journalism, Literature and Creative Communication Arts category as "a concerned citizen employing his pen as an effective adversary of corruption, inequality and injustice." In 2000, he was named as one of the International Press Institute's World Press Freedom Heroes. He has also been named International Editor of the Year Award and was awarded The Freedom to Publish Award.

=== Politics ===
At the onset of the Emergency period in India, Shourie wrote statements for Jayaprakash Narayan, a prominent leader of the opposition. This led to a career in investigative journalism. Eventually, when the Atal Behari Vajpayee government was formed in 1998, he was nominated as a Rajya Sabha member. He was nominated from the state of Uttar Pradesh as a BJP representative for two successive tenures in the Rajya Sabha, thus being a Member of Parliament for 1998–2004 and 2004–2010. He held the office of Minister of Disinvestment, Communication and Information Technology in the government of India under Vajpayee's prime ministership. As Disinvestment Minister, he led the sale of Maruti, VSNL, Hindustan Zinc among others.

Shourie was among many who objected to The Muslim Women (Protection of Rights on Divorce) Act 1986, which the government headed by Rajiv Gandhi proposed to alleviate communal violence and retain Muslim votes. Claimed by the government to be a reinforcement of India's constitutional secularism, it was widely criticised by both Muslims and Hindus. The liberals among them, says Ainslie Embree, saw it as "a capitulation to the forces of Islamic obscurantism, a return ... to the thirteenth century"; the Hindu revivalist critics thought it was "weakening Indian unity". Shourie wrote articles that tried to show that the treatment of women as required by the Quran would, in fact offer them protection, although the application of Islamic law in practice was oppressing them. He was in turn criticised for what was perceived as a thinly veiled attack on Islam itself, with Rafiq Zakaria, the Muslim scholar, saying that Shourie's concern for reform of Islam was in fact, demonstrative of "Hindu contempt" that used the plight of Muslim women as an example of the backwardness of the community. Vir Sanghvi termed it "Hindu chauvinism with a liberal face".

After the defeat of the BJP in the 2009 general elections, Shourie asked for introspection and accountability within the party. He deplored factionalism within the party and those who brief journalists to aid their own agenda.

Shourie has been described by Christophe Jaffrelot, a political scientist, as "a writer sympathetic to militant Hindu themes" and has publicly voiced support for the aims of the Rashtriya Swayamsevak Sangh (RSS), a nationalist Hindutva organisation. This has caused unease among some of those who admire his journalism. He has said that, although he sees danger from perceived Muslim violence such as the Godhra train burning incident of 2002, people have tended to redefine the "Hindutva" term. He says that prominent members of the Bharatiya Janata Party (BJP), of which he is a member and which has ties to the RSS — specifically, L. K. Advani and Atal Bihari Vajpayee — have shown their opposition to sectarian hatred and in their attempts to make the BJP inclusive have tried to marginalise those on both the Muslim and Hindu extremes who promote such hatred. As a political scientist, he views that present electoral system does not concern competency and integrity. He emphasised his views in a cultural conference called Tomorrow's India Global Summit and added that the pressure to bring about change in the present electoral system should come from the society.

Shourie has opposed reservation, a system of official legal discrimination in India similar to "affirmative action" in the United States. In 2017, he said "Panditji (Jawaharlal Nehru) had rightly said that in that way (reservation) lies not only folly but disaster."

=== Writer ===
Arun Shourie has written numerous books. In his book, Eminent Historians: Their Technology, Their Life, Their Fraud (2014), he criticises the Marxist school of Indian historiography for its ideological bias and selective interpretation of historical events, arguing it often distorts facts to fit a class struggle narrative. He challenges the Marxist portrayal of Indian history as overly focused on economic determinism and neglectful of cultural and spiritual dimensions. According to one review, the traits of his writings are:

recognisably the creation of a smart, determined, muckraking journalist, They are polemical, ad hominem, often extremely shrill in tone. ... But despite their style, the books are obviously the work of a brilliant man, with a wide if idiosyncratic learning, a passion for the freedoms of speech and press, and a desire to get beneath current events to address underlying issues.

=== Criticism ===
With the exception of Mahatma Gandhi, he has little time for any religious thinker and, says Nussbaum, his books "nowhere ... seek to provide balance; nowhere is there a sense of complexity. All have the same mocking, superior tone."

Historian D.N. Jha criticized Shourie's book Eminent Historians, which concerned the NCERT textbook controversies, on the grounds that it contains "slander" and "has nothing to do with history."

According to a report by Himal Southasian, Arun Shourie is credited as the most influential Indian journalist of his era, having transformed Indian Anglophone journalism by systematically "breaking all of its norms." The report notes that Shourie frequently "dispensed with objectivity and fairness," opting instead to embed personal biases directly into news coverage and utilizing "disdainful nicknames" for political figures such as Indira Gandhi.

His approach was characterized by a unique blend of investigative rigor and political activism; while his work was not always "necessarily original," it was supported by "extensive research, polemic, sheer volume and the power of the front page." Critically, the report suggests that Shourie’s "enormous reputation," initially forged through his earlier "leftist writings," provided the necessary "gravitas and prominence" for his subsequent shift toward right-wing ideologies, effectively turning him into a "major political actor" within the media landscape.

== IIT Kanpur ==
In 2000, Shourie pledged the entire amount (Rs. 12 crore) of discretionary spending available to him under Members of Parliament Local Area Development Scheme (MPLADS) to setting up of Bio-Sciences & Bio-engineering Department at the Indian Institute of Technology Kanpur. In 2005, he again pledged Rs. 11 crore for developing a separate building for Environmental Sciences and Environmental Engineering at the institute.

== Books ==
Author

- Symptoms of fascism, New Delhi : Vikas, 1978, 322 p.
- Hinduism : essence and consequence : a study of the Upanishads, the Gita and the Brahma-Sutras, Sahibabad : Vikas House, 1979, 414 p.
- Institutions in the Janata phase, Bombay : Popular Prakashan, 1980, 300 p.
- Mrs Gandhi's second reign, New Delhi : Vikas; New York : Distributed by Advent Books, 1983, 532 p.
- The Assassination & after, New Delhi : Roli Books Internat., 1985, 160 p.
- On the current situation : new opportunities, new challenges, Pune : New Quest, 1985, 57 p.
- Religion in Politics, New Delhi : Roli Books, 1987, 334 p.
- Individuals, institutions, processes : how one may strengthen the other in India today, New Delhi, India; New York, N.Y., U.S.A. : Viking, 1990, 239 p.
- The State as charade: V.P. Singh, Chandra Shekhar & the rest, New Delhi : Roli Books, 1991, 425 p.
- "The Only fatherland" : communists, "Quit India", and the Soviet Union, New Delhi : ASA Publications, 1991, 204 p.
- These lethal, inexorable laws: Rajiv, his men, and his regime, New Delhi : Roli Books, 1991, 433 p.
- A Secular Agenda: For Saving Our Country, for Welding It, New Delhi : ASA Publications, 1993, 376 p.
- Indian Controversies: Essays on Religion in Politics, New Delhi : Rupa & Co., 1993, 522 p.
- Missionaries in India : continuities, changes, dilemmas, New Delhi : ASA Publications, 1994, 305 p.
- World of Fatwas: Shariah in Action, New Delhi : ASA Publications, 1995, 685 p.
- Worshipping False Gods: Ambedkar, and the facts which have been erased, New Delhi : ASA Publ., 1997, 663 p.
- Eminent Historians: Their Technology, Their Life, Their Fraud, New Delhi : ASA Publ., 1998, 271 p.
- Harvesting Our Souls: Missionaries, Their Design, Their Claims, New Delhi : ASA Publ., 2000, 432 p.
- Courts and Their Judgments: Premises, Prerequisites, Consequences, New Delhi : Rupa & Co., 2001, 454 p.
- Governance And The Sclerosis That Has Set In, New Delhi : ASA Publ., 2005, 262 p.
- Will the Iron Fence Save a Tree Hollowed by Termites?: Defence Imperatives Beyond the Military, New Delhi : ASA Publications, 2005, 485 p.
- Falling Over Backwards: An Essay on Reservations, and on Judicial Populism, New Delhi : ASA : Rupa & Co., 2006, 378 p.
- The Parliamentary System: What We Have Made Of It, What We Can Make Of It, New Delhi : Rupa & Co., 2006, 264 p.
- Where Will All this Take Us?: Denial, Disunity, Disarray, New Delhi : Rupa & Co., 2006, 604 p.
- Are We Deceiving Ourselves Again?: Lessons the Chinese Taught Pandit Nehru But which We Still Refuse to Learn, New Delhi : ASA Publ., 2008, 204 p.
- We Must Have No Price: National Security, Reforms, Political Reconstruction, New Delhi : Express Group : Rupa & Co., 2010, 343 p.
- Does He Know A Mothers Heart : How Suffering Refutes Religion, Noida : HarperCollins, 2011, 444 p.
- Two Saints: Speculations Around and About Ramakrishna Paramahamsa and Ramana Maharishi, Noida : HarperCollins, 2017, 496 p.
- Anita Gets Bail: What Are Our Courts Doing? What Should We Do About Them?, Noida : HarperCollins, 2018, 288 p.
- Preparing For Death, India Viking, 2020, 528 p.
- The Commissioner Of Lost Causes, Penguin Viking, 2022, 616 p.
- The New Icon: Savarkar and the Facts, Penguin Viking, 2025, 560 p.

Co-author

- with Amarjit Kaurn, Raghu Rai et al., The Punjab story, New Delhi : Roli books international, 1984, 199 p.
- with Sita Ram Goel, Harsh Narain, Jay Dubashi and Ram Swarup, Hindu Temples - What Happened to Them Vol. I : A Preliminary Survey, New Delhi : Voice of India, 1990, 191 p.
- with Sita Ram Goel, Koenraad Elst, Ram Swarup, Freedom of expression — Secular Theocracy Versus Liberal Democracy, Voice of India (1998).
- with Arun Jaitley, Swapan Dasgupta, Rama J Jois, Harsh Narain-The Ayodhya Reference:Suprema Court judgment and commentaries, Voice of India(1994)
