= Girilal Jain =

Indian journalist and editor

- Born: 1924; Piplikhera, Sonipat district, Punjab Province, British Raj, (present-day Sonipat district, Haryana, India)
- Died: July 19, 1993 (aged 68–69)
- Occupation: Journalist
- Spouse: Sudarshan Jain (1951)
- Children: Meenakshi Jain; Sandhya Jain; Sunil Jain

Girilal Jain (1924 – 19 July 1993) was an Indian journalist. He served as the editor of The Times of India from 1978 until 1988. He advocated establishing old glory and re-establishing the great tenets of Hinduism aligned with nationalism and authored books on the subject, the best known of which, The Hindu Phenomenon, was published posthumously. The Government of India awarded him the civilian honour of the Padma Bhushan in 1989. He is accused by Rep. Duke Cunningham in the Congressional Record of 28 September 1996 of being vituperative towards Sikhs in 1982 editorial named "De-Turbaning of Sikhs".

== Personal life ==
Girilal Jain was born in Piplikhera in Sonipat district in Punjab Province, British Raj (in present-day Haryana, India), which falls in Delhi National Capital Region. He received a bachelor's degree in history from Hindu College, Delhi, from Delhi University. He married Sudarshan Jain in 1951. They had a son and three daughters, including the historian Meenakshi Jain and the columnist Sandhya Jain. Sunil Jain, his son, was a journalist, who was the managing-editor of The Financial Express.

At the age of 69, Girilal Jain died on 19 July 1993.

== Journalism career ==
Jain began his career in journalism in 1948 with the News Chronicle. In 1950, he shifted to The Times of India, where he worked as a sub-editor. Later, he shifted to reporting and became chief reporter in 1958. Besides Delhi, he served for the newspaper from Karachi and London. Later, Jain served as the editor-in-chief of The Times of India from 1978 to 1988.

== His views ==
Khushwant Singh wrote that, towards the end of his career, Girilal Jain's writings showed a "distinct anti-Muslim, anti-Sikh and anti-Christian bias." Jain was reportedly fired as the editor of the Times of India as a result of his alleged Hindutva sympathies.

After retirement, he wrote on the core issues of pre-independence and post-partition suffering of Hindus and penned the book The Hindu Phenomenon, which was edited and published by his daughter Meenakshi Jain posthumously.

Girilal Jain welcomed the movement for the Ram Janmabhoomi at Ayodhya as part of the process of long-lost justice for Hindus.

He believed that the political-economic order that Jawaharlal Nehru had fashioned was as much in its last throes as its progenitor, the Marxist–Leninist-Stalinist-Maoist order. He believed that the two major planks of this order, secularism and socialism, have "lost much of their old glitter" while the third, non-alignment, has become redundant.

According to him, the concept of nation is alien to Hindu temperament and genius; for it emphasized the exclusion of those who did not belong to the charmed circle (territorial, linguistic or ethnic) as much as it emphasized the inclusion of those who fell within the circle. By contrast, the essential spirit of Hinduism was inclusivist, and not exclusivist, by definition. Such a spirit must seek to abolish and not build boundaries. That is why, he held, that Hindus could not sustain an anti-Muslim feeling, except temporarily and, that too only under provocation.

Jain was criticized by Rep. Duke Cunningham in the Congressional Record of 28 September 1996 for his 1982 Times of India editorial titled "De-Turbaning of Sikhs" for its anti-Sikh bias.
