= Sita Ram Goel =

Hindu nationalist writer and publisher (1921–2003)

- Sita Ram Goel
- Born: 16 October 1921; Punjab Province, British India
- Died: 3 December 2003 (aged 82)
- Education: University of Delhi
- Occupations: Historian; Writer; publisher
- Writing career
- Period: Late 20th century
- Genres: History, Politics, Comparative Religion
- Subjects: Hinduism, Dharmic traditions, Christianity, Islam, Communism, Indian politics, British Imperialism
- Notable works: How I Became a Hindu; The Story of Islamic Imperialism in India; History of Hindu–Christian Encounters, AD 304 to 1996; Catholic Ashrams; Hindu Temples: What Happened to Them

Sita Ram Goel (16 October 1921 – 3 December 2003) was an Indian Hindu nationalist writer, and publisher known for his literature pertaining to Hinduism and Hindu nationalism in the late twentieth century. He was one of the founders of Voice of India.

In his later career, Goel transitioned into a role as a commentator on Indian politics, aligning himself openly with the Hindutva ideology, a stance that has generated significant debate and scrutiny among scholars and observers of Indian society and politics.

== Life ==
=== Early life ===
Sita Ram Goel was born to a Hindu family in Punjab, in 1921; though his childhood was spent in Calcutta. The family looked upon Sri Garib Das, a nirguna saint comparable to Kabir and Nanak, as its patron saint and his verses, "Granth Saheb", were often recited at their home.

Goel graduated in history from the University of Delhi in 1944. As a student, he was a social activist and worked for a Harijan Ashram in his village. His sympathies for the Arya Samaj, the Harijans and the Indian freedom movement, along with his strong support for Mahatma Gandhi, brought him into conflict with many people in his village; Goel also learned to speak and write Sanskrit during his college days.

== Works ==
=== Hindu View of Christianity and Islam (1993) ===
In 1993 the MP Syed Shahabuddin, who in 1988 asked for the ban on The Satanic Verses, demanded a ban on Ram Swarup's book Hindu View of Christianity and Islam. Goel and Swarup went into hiding because they feared that they could get arrested. The court accepted a bail and the authors came out of hiding. Arun Shourie and K. S. Lal protested against the ban.

=== Colin Maine's The Dead Hand of Islam ===
In 1986, Goel reprinted Colin Maine's essay The Dead Hand of Islam . Some Muslims filed a criminal case against Goel, alleging that it violated Sections 153A and 295A of the Indian Penal Code and similar articles of the Indian Customs Act.

The judge discharged Goel and referred to the earlier court precedent "1983 CrLJ 1446". Speaking of the importance of that precedent, the judge in his discussion said: "If such a contention is accepted a day will come when that part of history which is unpalatable to a particular religion will have to be kept in cold storage on the pretext that the publication of such history would constitute an offence punishable under Sec. 153A of the Penal Code. The scope of S-153A cannot be enlarged to such an extent with a view to thwart history. (...) Otherwise, the position will be very precarious. A nation will have to forget its own history and in due course the nation will have no history at all. (...) If anybody intends to extinguish the history (by prohibiting its publication) of the nation on the pretext of taking action under the above sections, his act will have to be treated as malafide one."

=== The Calcutta Quran Petition ===
Goel published The Calcutta Quran Petition with Chandmal Chopra in 1986. On 31 August 1987, Chopra was arrested by the police and kept in custody until 8 September for publishing the book with Goel. Goel absconded to avoid arrest.

=== Hindu Temples – What Happened to Them ===
There were proposals in November 1990 in Uttar Pradesh to ban Goel's book Hindu Temples - What Happened to Them.

== Legacy ==
Political scientist Chetan Bhatt says that Goel has "a highly selective obsession with archaeology and to some extent anthropology" and that he marshalls "the most selective archaeological and historical facts." He also stated, "Goel’s text uses Islamic sources to 'prove' that Mughals were only interested in religious domination of Hindus and nothing more. The historical method used is based almost entirely on highly selective non-contextual quotations from these sources." S. Subramaniam criticized Goel's Islamophobia, stating, "Shourie has nothing to say beyond repeating the Islamophobic tirade of his henchman, the monomaniacal Sita Ram Goel who is referred to repeatedly in the text as 'indefatigable' and even 'intrepid'. Goel’s stock in trade has been to reproduce ad nauseam the same extracts from those colonial pillars Elliott and Dowson and that happy neo-colonialist Sir Jadunath Sarkar."

== Books and booklets ==
=== English ===
Author

- The China debate; whom shall we believe?, Calcutta: Society for Defence of Freedom in Asia, 1953, 50 p.
- Mind Murder in Mao-land, Calcutta: Society for Defence of Freedom in Asia, 1953, 53 p.
- Communist Party in China: a study in treason., Calcutta: Society for Defence of Freedom in Asia, 1953, 106 p.
- China is red with peasants' blood, Calcutta: Society for Defence of Freedom in Asia, 1953, 92 p.
- CPI conspires for civil-war: analysis of a secret document, Calcutta: Society for Defence of Freedom in Asia, 1953, 56 p.
- Red brother or yellow slave ?, Calcutta: Society for Defence of Freedom in Asia, 1953, 82 p.
- Nehru's fatal friendship, New Delhi: Society for Defence of Freedom in Asia, 1955, 29 p.
- Netaji and the CPI, Calcutta: Society for Defence of Freedom in Asia, 1955, 72 p.
- In defence of Comrade Krishna Menon : a political biography of Pandit Nehru, New Delhi: Bharati Sahitya Sadan, 1963, 272 p. A reprint with changes would appear in 1993 as the Volume I of Genesis and growth of Nehruism.
- Hindu society under siege, New Delhi: Voice of India, 1981, 48 p. A revised edition released in 1994.
- How I Became a Hindu, New Delhi: Voice of India, 1982, 67 p. A third enlarged edition would appear in 1993, 106 p.
- The Story of Islamic Imperialism in India, New Delhi: Voice of India, 1982, 126 p. A second enlarged edition would appear in 1994, 138 p.
- Defence of Hindu Society, New Delhi: Voice of India, 1983, 96 p. A second edition would appear in 1987 and a third enlarged one in 1994, 118 p.
- Muslim separatism : causes and consequences, New Delhi: Voice of India, 1983, 123 p. A second revised edition will appear in 1995, 128 p.
- Perversion of India's political parlance, New Delhi: Voice of India, 1984, 60 p.
- History of heroic Hindu resistance to Muslim invaders, 636 AD to 1206 AD, New Delhi: Voice of India, 1984, 48 p. Another edition would be released in 1994, 58 p.
- The emerging national vision, New Delhi: Voice of India, 1984, 15 p.
- St. Francis Xavier : the man and his mission, New Delhi: Voice of India, 1985, 16 p.
- Papacy, its doctrines and history, New Delhi: Voice of India, 1986, 118 p.
- Catholic Ashrams: adopting and adapting Hindu dharma, New Delhi: Voice of India, 1988, 100 p.
- History of Hindu–Christian Encounters, AD 304 to 1996, New Delhi: Voice of India, 1989, 405 p. A second revised and enlarged edition would appear in 1996, 530 p.
- Hindus and Hinduism : Manipulation of meanings, New Delhi: Voice of India, 1993, 24 p.
- Islam vis-a-vis Hindu temples, New Delhi: Voice of India, 1993, 66 p.
- Genesis and growth of Nehruism. vol. 1, Commitment to Communism, New Delhi: Voice of India, 1993, 231 p. Reprint with changes of the 1963 book In defence of Comrade Krishna Menon.
- Stalinist "historians" spread the big lie, New Delhi: Voice of India, 1993, 38 p.
- Jesus Christ : an artifice for aggression, New Delhi: Voice of India, 1994, 114 p.

Editor

- Hindu temples, what happened to them : Vol. I, A preliminary survey, New Delhi: Voice of India, 1990, 191 p. With Arun Shourie et al. Volume II would be released in 1993, 440 p.
- Freedom of expression : secular theocracy versus liberal democracy, New Delhi: Voice of India, 1998, 179 p. Mostly articles.
- Time for stock taking, whither Sangh Parivar?, New Delhi: Voice of India, 1997, 468 p. Criticisms of the BJP and RSS, including their responses.
- Vindicated by Time: the Niyogi Committee report on Christian missionary activities, New Delhi: Voice of India, 1998, 1006 p. A reprint, with an introduction by Goel, of the official report on the missionaries' methods of subversion and conversion, from 1956.

Prefaces, introductions or commentaries

- Introduction to Joseph Stalin's World Conquest in Instalments, Calcutta: Society for Defence of Freedom in Asia, 1952, 56 p.
- Commentary of Mao Zedong's The conquest of China, Calcutta: Society for Defence of Freedom in Asia, 1954, 276 p.
- Preface to Chandmal Chopra's The Calcutta Quran Petition, New Delhi: Voice of India, 1986, 71 p. A third revised and enlarged edition would appear in 1999, with more writing by Goel, 325 p.
- Preface to Tipu Sultan: Villain Or Hero? : an Anthology, New Delhi: Voice of India, 1993, 85 p.
- Preface to the reprint of Mathilda Joslyn Gage's Woman, Church and State (1997, ca. 1880). A feminist critique of Christianity.

=== Hindi ===
Author

- Pathabhṛshṭa, 1960.
- Saikyularijma : deśadroha kā dūsrā nāma, 1983.Yashpal Sharma would translate it into English as India's secularism, new name for national subversion, New Delhi: Voice of India, 1999, 107 p.
- Udīyamāna raṣṭra-dṛṣṭi, 1983.
- Hindū samāja : saṅkeṭoṃ ke ghere meṃ, 1988.
- Saptaśīla, 1999.

Translator

- Satyakama Socrates, three dialogues of Plato : (Apology, Crito and Phaedo))
- Victor Kravchenko's I Chose Freedom
- Thomas Gray's poem Elegy.
- Bankim Chandra Chattopadhyay's Ramayaner Alochona
- The God that Failed, a testimony on Communism by Arthur Koestler, André Gide and others.
- Ram Swarup's Communism and Peasantry
- George Orwell's Nineteen Eighty-Four
- Shaktiputra Shivaji, Denis Kincaid's The Grand Rebel
- Panchjanya, Taslima Nasrin's Lajja

== See also ==
- Ram Swarup
- Koenraad Elst
- Robert Spencer
- Ibn Warraq
- Srđa Trifković
- Oriana Fallaci
- Andrew Bostom
- Swapan Dasgupta
