= Dehestan =

Dehestan, Dehistan or Dahistan (Persian: دهستان) is a name shared by many places in Central Asia. It may refer to:

- the homeland of the Dahae, an extinct ancient tribe in what is now Turkmenistan and Iran
- Dehestan (administrative division) ("district" or "county") is a modern administrative subdivision in Iran
- Dehestan, Afghanistan
- Dehestan, East Azerbaijan, Iran
- Dehestan-e Bala, Iran
- Dehestan-e Pain, Iran
- Dehistan/Mishrian, an archaeological site in Turkmenistan
- an alternate name for Hyrcania
