= Namazga-Tepe =

Bronze Age archaeological site in Turkmenistan

Coordinates: 37°22′22″N 59°33′25″E

- Namazga-depe
- Location in Turkmenistan Namazga-Tepe (West and Central Asia)
- Periods: Bronze Age
- Cultures: BMAC

Namazga-Tepe or Namazga-depe, is a Bronze Age (BMAC) archaeological site in Turkmenistan, at the foot of the Kopet-Dag, near the delta of the Tejen River, some 100 km east of Aşgabat, near the border to Iran. Excavated by Vadim Mikhailovich Masson, Viktor Sarianidi, and I. N. Khlopin from the 1950s, the site set the chronology for the Bronze Age sites in Turkmenistan (Namazga III-VI).

Namazga culture was preceded in the area by the Jeitun culture.

== Chronology ==
It is believed that the Anau culture of Turkmenistan considerably precedes the Namazga culture in the area. Namazga I period (c. 4000–3500 BC), is considered contemporary with Anau IB2 period.

Namazga III (c. 3200–2800) as a village settlement in Late Chalcolithic phase, and Namazga IV (c. 2800–2400 BC) as a proto-urban site, both belong to the Late Regionalization Era.

Namazga V (c. 2400–2000 BC), is in the Integration Era or the period of "urban revolution" following the Anatolian model with little or no irrigation. Namazga-Tepe emerges as the production and probable governmental center, covering some 60 hectares, with Altyndepe likely a secondary capital. Around 1600 BC, Altyndepe is abandoned, and Namazga-Tepe shrinks to a fraction of its former size.

Namazga VI in the Late Bronze Age (c. 1800–1500 BC), as part of the Localization Era is characterized by the incursion of nomadic pastoralists from the Alekseyevka culture and/or Srubna culture.

There have also been detailed painted potteries located at this site.

The following table clarifies the chronology of Namazga culture.

Cultural chronology for Turkmenistan and the South Central Asia
Period	Dates
Neolithic of Jeitun type	6200–5000 BCE
Proto-Chalcolithic (Anau Ia)	5200–4800 BCE
Early-Chalcolithic (Namazga I)	4800–4000 BCE
Middle-Chalcolithic (Namazga II)	4000–3500 BCE
Late-Chalcolithic (Namazga III)	3500–3000 BCE
Early Bronze (Namazga IV)	3000–2500 BCE
Middle Bronze (Namazga V)	2500–2200 BCE
Late Bronze (Namazga VI)	2200–1500 BCE
Late Bronze (Margian, Gonur phase)	2200–1800 BCE
Late Bronze (Margian, Togolok phase)	1800–1500 BCE
Early Iron (Yaz culture I)	1500–1100 BCE
Archaic Dehistan/Mishrian (SW Turkmenistan)	1300–500 BCE
Pre-Achaemenid and Achaemenid (Yaz II-III)	1100–329 BCE

== See also ==
- South Turkmenistan Complex Archaeological Expedition

== Bibliography ==
- V. M. Masson and V. I. Sarianidi, Central Asia: Turkmenia before the Achaemenids (trans. Tringham, 1972); review: Charles C. Kolb, American Anthropologist (1973), 1945–1948.
