= Tirandazi =

Tirandazi تیراندازی
- Village
- Location within Iran
- Coordinates: 28°23′50″N 55°43′04″E
- Country: Iran
- Province: Hormozgan
- County: Hajjiabad
- Bakhsh: Central
- Rural District: Dar Agah

Population (2006)
  - Total: 104
- Time zone: UTC+3:30 (IRST)
  - Summer (DST): UTC+4:30 (IRDT)

Tirandazi (Persian: تیراندازی, also Romanized as Tīrandāzī; also known as Bardīnū) is a village in Dar Agah Rural District, in the Central District of Hajjiabad County, Hormozgan Province, Iran. At the 2006 census, its population was 104, in 26 families.
