= Barghani-ye Bala =

Barghani-ye Bala برغني بالا
- Village
- Location within Iran
- Coordinates: 28°15′32″N 55°45′14″E
- Country: Iran
- Province: Hormozgan
- County: Hajjiabad
- Bakhsh: Central
- Rural District: Tarom

Population (2006)
  - Total: 330
- Time zone: UTC+3:30 (IRST)
  - Summer (DST): UTC+4:30 (IRDT)

Barghani-ye Bala (Persian: برغني بالا, also Romanized as Barghanī-ye Bālā; also known as Barghanī) is a village in Tarom Rural District, in the Central District of Hajjiabad County, Hormozgan Province, Iran. At the 2006 census, its population was 330, in 85 families.
