= Najafabad, Hormozgan =

Nejatabad نجات آباد
- Village
- Location within Iran
- Coordinates: 28°14′19″N 55°48′30″E
- Country: Iran
- Province: Hormozgan
- County: Hajjiabad
- Bakhsh: Central
- Rural District: Tarom

Population (2006)
  - Total: 33
- Time zone: UTC+3:30 (IRST)
  - Summer (DST): UTC+4:30 (IRDT)

Najafabad (Persian: نجف آباد, also Romanized as Najafābād; also known as Dar Eshkaft (Persian: دراشكفت) and Darreh Eshgoft) is a village in Tarom Rural District, in the Central District of Hajjiabad County, Hormozgan Province, Iran. In the 2006 census, its population was 33 people, in 7 families.
