= Tezerj, Hormozgan =

Tezerj تذرج
- Village
- Location within Iran
- Coordinates: 28°17′05″N 55°44′57″E
- Country: Iran
- Province: Hormozgan
- County: Hajjiabad
- Bakhsh: Central
- Rural District: Tarom

Population (2006)
  - Total: 320
- Time zone: UTC+3:30 (IRST)
  - Summer (DST): UTC+4:30 (IRDT)

Tezerj (Persian: تذرج, also Romanized as Tazarj; also known as Tererj) is a village in Tarom Rural District, in the Central District of Hajjiabad County, Hormozgan Province, Iran. At the 2006 census, its population was 320, in 95 families.
