= Laygazan =

Laygazan لايگزان
- Village
- Location within Iran
- Coordinates: 28°10′25″N 55°48′26″E
- Country: Iran
- Province: Hormozgan
- County: Hajjiabad
- Bakhsh: Central
- Rural District: Tarom

Population (2006)
  - Total: 21
- Time zone: UTC+3:30 (IRST)
  - Summer (DST): UTC+4:30 (IRDT)

Laygazan (Persian: لايگزان, also Romanized as Lāygazān) is a village in Tarom Rural District, in the Central District of Hajjiabad County, Hormozgan Province, Iran. At the 2006 census, the population was 21 and consisted of 9 families.
