= Golruiyeh =

Golruiyeh گلروئيه
- Village
- Location within Iran
- Coordinates: 28°08′10″N 55°44′49″E
- Country: Iran
- Province: Hormozgan
- County: Hajjiabad
- Bakhsh: Central
- Rural District: Tarom

Population (2006)
  - Total: 21
- Time zone: UTC+3:30 (IRST)
  - Summer (DST): UTC+4:30 (IRDT)

Golruiyeh (Persian: گلروئيه, also Romanized as Golrū’īyeh and Golroo’eyeh) is a village in Tarom Rural District, in the Central District of Hajjiabad County, Hormozgan Province, Iran. At the 2006 census, its population was 21, in 4 families.
