= Mehr Khowshan =

Mehr Khowshan مهرخوشان
- Village
- Location within Iran
- Coordinates: 28°38′46″N 55°35′25″E
- Country: Iran
- Province: Hormozgan
- County: Hajjiabad
- Bakhsh: Central
- Rural District: Dar Agah

Population (2006)
  - Total: 10
- Time zone: UTC+3:30 (IRST)
  - Summer (DST): UTC+4:30 (IRDT)

Mehr Khowshan. A Village In Iran (Persian: مهرخوشان, also Romanized as Mehr Khowshān; also known as Mahr Rakhshān, Mahr Rakshān, Mehr Bakhshān, Mehr Jūshān, Mehr Rakhshān, and Mehr Rākīshān) is a village in Dar Agah Rural District, in the Central District of Hajjiabad County, Hormozgan Province, Iran. At the 2006 census, its population was 10, in 5 families.
