= Baynuj =

Baynuj باينوج
- Village
- Location within Iran
- Coordinates: 28°27′13″N 55°40′18″E
- Country: Iran
- Province: Hormozgan
- County: Hajjiabad
- Bakhsh: Central
- Rural District: Dar Agah

Population (2006)
  - Total: 533
- Time zone: UTC+3:30 (IRST)
  - Summer (DST): UTC+4:30 (IRDT)

Baynuj (Persian: باينوج, also Romanized as Bāynūj; also known as Bainu, Bāynū, and Beynū) is a village in Dar Agah Rural District, in the Central District of Hajjiabad County, Hormozgan Province, Iran. At the 2006 census, its population was 533, in 127 families.
