= Abad, Hormozgan =

Abad ابباد
- Village
- Location within Iran
- Coordinates: 28°43′39″N 55°41′54″E
- Country: Iran
- Province: Hormozgan
- County: Hajjiabad
- Bakhsh: Central
- Rural District: Dar Agah

Population (2006)
  - Total: 20
- Time zone: UTC+3:30 (IRST)
  - Summer (DST): UTC+4:30 (IRDT)

Abad (Persian: ابباد, also Romanized as Ābād also known as Gerdāb) is a village in Dar Agah Rural District, in the Central District of Hajjiabad County, Hormozgan province, Iran. At the 2006 census, its population was 20, in 7 families.
