= Qalatuiyeh =

Qalatuiyeh (Persian: قلاتوييه), also rendered as Qalatu, may refer to:

- Qalatuyeh, Fars Province
- Qalatuiyeh, Hormozgan
- Qalatuiyeh-ye Tang-e Salehi, Hormozgan Province
- Qalatuiyeh, Baft, Kerman Province
- Qalatuiyeh, Jiroft, Kerman Province
