= Seh Shah =

Seh Shah سه شاح
- Village
- Location within Iran
- Coordinates: 28°42′32″N 55°44′16″E
- Country: Iran
- Province: Hormozgan
- County: Hajjiabad
- Bakhsh: Central
- Rural District: Dar Agah

Population (2006)
  - Total: 16
- Time zone: UTC+3:30 (IRST)
  - Summer (DST): UTC+4:30 (IRDT)

Seh Shah (Persian: سه شاح, also Romanized as Seh Shāḥ; also known as Seh Shākh) is a village in Dar Agah Rural District, in the Central District of Hajjiabad County, Hormozgan Province, Iran. At the 2006 census, its population was 16, in 6 families.
