= Dar Agah =

Dar Agah دراگاه
- Village
- Location within Iran
- Coordinates: 28°21′18″N 55°42′37″E
- Country: Iran
- Province: Hormozgan
- County: Hajjiabad
- Bakhsh: Central
- Rural District: Dar Agah

Population (2006)
  - Total: 188
- Time zone: UTC+3:30 (IRST)
  - Summer (DST): UTC+4:30 (IRDT)

Dar Agah (Persian: دراگاه, also Romanized as Dar Āgāh, Derāgāh, and Dorāgāh; also known as Dūrāhgāh) is a village in Dar Agah Rural District, in the Central District of Hajjiabad County, Hormozgan province, Iran. At the 2006 census, its population was 188, in 57 families.
