= Abzaluiyeh =

Abzaluiyeh آب زالوئيه
- Village
- Location within Iran
- Coordinates: 28°39′13″N 55°59′52″E
- Country: Iran
- Province: Hormozgan
- County: Hajjiabad
- Bakhsh: Central
- Rural District: Dar Agah

Population (2006)
  - Total: 55
- Time zone: UTC+3:30 (IRST)
  - Summer (DST): UTC+4:30 (IRDT)

Abzaluiyeh (Persian: آب زالوئيه, also Romanized as Ābzālū’īyeh; also known as Ābzūlū’īyeh) is a village in Dar Agah Rural District, in the Central District of Hajjiabad County, Hormozgan Province, Iran. At the 2006 census, its population was 55, in 11 families.
