= Nasuiyeh =

Nasuiyeh نسوئيه
- Village
- Location within Iran
- Coordinates: 28°28′10″N 55°29′01″E
- Country: Iran
- Province: Hormozgan
- County: Hajjiabad
- Bakhsh: Central
- Rural District: Dar Agah

Population (2006)
  - Total: 146
- Time zone: UTC+3:30 (IRST)
  - Summer (DST): UTC+4:30 (IRDT)

Nasuiyeh (Persian: نسوئيه, also Romanized as Nasū’īyeh) is a village in Dar Agah Rural District, in the Central District of Hajjiabad County, Hormozgan Province, Iran. At the 2006 census, its population was 146, in 36 families.
