= Galleh-ye Ashotori =

Galleh-ye Ashotori گله اشتري
- Village
- Location within Iran
- Coordinates: 28°24′49″N 55°41′55″E
- Country: Iran
- Province: Hormozgan
- County: Hajjiabad
- Bakhsh: Central
- Rural District: Dar Agah

Population (2006)
  - Total: 74
- Time zone: UTC+3:30 (IRST)
  - Summer (DST): UTC+4:30 (IRDT)

Galleh-ye Ashotori (Persian: گله اشتري, also Romanized as Galleh Āshotorī and Gallehshotori) is a village in Dar Agah Rural District, in the Central District of Hajjiabad County, Hormozgan Province, Iran. At the 2006 census, its population was 74, in 23 families.
