= Tall Qaleh-ye Pain =

Tall Qaleh-ye Pain تل قلعه پايين
- Village
- Location within Iran
- Coordinates: 28°00′41″N 55°48′54″E
- Country: Iran
- Province: Hormozgan
- County: Hajjiabad
- Bakhsh: Central
- Rural District: Tarom

Population (2006)
  - Total: 288
- Time zone: UTC+3:30 (IRST)
  - Summer (DST): UTC+4:30 (IRDT)

Tall Qaleh-ye Pain (Persian: تل قلعه پايين, also Romanized as Tall-e Qal’eh-ye Pāīn and Tal Qal‘eh-ye Pā’īn) is a village in Tarom Rural District, in the Central District of Hajjiabad County, Hormozgan Province, Iran. At the 2006 census, its population was 288, in 67 families.
