= Khuneh-ye Varz =

Village in Hormozgan, Iran

Khuneh-ye Varz خونه ورز
- Village
- Location within Iran
- Coordinates: 28°21′00″N 55°40′12″E
- Country: Iran
- Province: Hormozgan
- County: Hajjiabad
- Bakhsh: Central
- Rural District: Dar Agah

Population (2006)
  - Total: 20
- Time zone: UTC+3:30 (IRST)
  - Summer (DST): UTC+4:30 (IRDT)

Khuneh-ye Varz (Persian: خونه ورز, also Romanized as Khūneh-ye Varz) is a village in Dar Agah Rural District, in the Central District (Hajjiabad County), Hormozgan Province, Iran. At the 2006 census, its population was 20, in 5 families.
