= Seyyed Jowzar =

Seyyed Jowzar سيدجوزر
- Village
- Location within Iran
- Coordinates: 28°08′54″N 55°41′11″E
- Country: Iran
- Province: Hormozgan
- County: Hajjiabad
- Bakhsh: Central
- Rural District: Tarom

Population (2006)
  - Total: 318
- Time zone: UTC+3:30 (IRST)
  - Summer (DST): UTC+4:30 (IRDT)

Seyyed Jowzar (Persian: سيدجوزر, also Romanized as Seyyed Joozar) is a village in Tarom Rural District, in the Central District of Hajjiabad County, Hormozgan Province, Iran.

== Demographics ==
At the 2006 census, its population was 318, in 78 families.
