= Gis, Iran =

Gis گيس
- Village
- Location within Iran
- Coordinates: 28°36′00″N 55°44′00″E
- Country: Iran
- Province: Hormozgan
- County: Hajjiabad
- Bakhsh: Central
- Rural District: Dar Agah

Population (2006)
  - Total: 721
- Time zone: UTC+3:30 (IRST)
  - Summer (DST): UTC+4:30 (IRDT)

Gis (Persian: گيس, also Romanized as Gīs; also known as Gīseh, Gīshū’īyeh-ye Bāla, Gīshū’īyeh-ye Pā’īn, and Kīsa) is a village in Dar Agah Rural District, in the Central District of Hajjiabad County, Hormozgan province, Iran. At the 2006 census, its population was 721, in 170 families.
