= Gahkom =

Gahkom گهكم
- Village
- Location within Iran
- Coordinates: 28°10′45″N 55°49′32″E
- Country: Iran
- Province: Hormozgan
- County: Hajjiabad
- Bakhsh: Central
- Rural District: Tarom

Population (2006)
  - Total: 453
- Time zone: UTC+3:30 (IRST)
  - Summer (DST): UTC+4:30 (IRDT)

Gahkom (Persian: گهكم; also known as Gahkān, Gakum, and Kahkom) is a village in Tarom Rural District, in the Central District of Hajjiabad County, Hormozgan Province, Iran. At the 2006 census, its population was 453, in 131 families.
