= Tarom (disambiguation) =

TAROM is a Romanian airline.

Tarom may also refer to:

== Places ==
=== Populated places ===
- Tarom, Chaharmahal and Bakhtiari, a village in Iran
- Tarom, East Azerbaijan, a village in Iran
- Tarom, Hormozgan, a village in Iran
- Tarom, Lorestan, a village in Iran
- Tarom, Tehran, a village in Iran
- Tarom Dasht, a village in Iran

=== Administrative subdivisions ===
- Tarom County, Iran
- Tarom Rural District, Iran
- Tarom-e Sofla District, Iran
