= Ganj =

Ganj may refer to:

- Ganj, or ganja, a name for cannabis
- Ganj, Chaharmahal and Bakhtiari, a village in Iran
- Ganj, Hormozgan, a village in Iran
- Ganj-e Besiar, Kohgiluyeh and Boyer-Ahmad Province, a village in Iran
- Ganjdundawara, a town in Uttar Pradesh, India
