= Baghat, Hormozgan =

Village in Hormozgan province, Iran

Baghat Persian: باغات
- Village
- Location within Iran
- Coordinates: 28°41′43″N 55°48′43″E
- Country: Iran
- Province: Hormozgan
- County: Hajjiabad
- District: Central
- Rural District: Daragah

Population (2016)
  - Total: 1,347
- Time zone: UTC+3:30 (IRST)

Baghat (Persian: باغات) (Note: Also romanized as Bāghāt; also known as Bāgh, Bāgha, Baka, and Ḩājjīābād-e Bāghāt) is a village in Daragah Rural District of the Central District of Hajjiabad County, Hormozgan province, Iran.

== Demographics ==
=== Population ===
At the time of the 2006 National Census, the village's population was 1,279 in 338 households. The following census in 2011 counted 1,313 people in 371 households. The 2016 census measured the population of the village as 1,347 people in 422 households. It was the most populous village in its rural district.
