= Garmeshak =

Garmeshak or Garmeshk (Persian: گرمشك) may refer to:

- Garmeshak, Hormozgan
- Garmeshk, Kerman
