= Gashnuiyeh-ye Bala =

Gashnuiyeh-ye Bala گشنوئيه بالا
- Village
- Location within Iran
- Coordinates: 28°33′07″N 55°43′02″E
- Country: Iran
- Province: Hormozgan
- County: Hajjiabad
- Bakhsh: Central
- Rural District: Dar Agah

Population (2006)
  - Total: 52
- Time zone: UTC+3:30 (IRST)
  - Summer (DST): UTC+4:30 (IRDT)

Gashnuiyeh-ye Bala (Persian: گشنوئيه بالا, also Romanized as Gashnū’īyeh-ye Bālā; also known as Goshnū’īyeh, Gūshnūyeh, and Gūshnūyeh-ye Bālā) is a village in Dar Agah Rural District, in the Central District of Hajjiabad County, Hormozgan Province, Iran. At the 2006 census, its population was 52, in 14 families.
