= Lardgaram =

Lardgaram (Persian: لردگرم) may refer to:

- Lardgaram-e Bala
- Lardgaram-e Pain
