= South Turkmenistan Complex Archaeological Expedition =

Archaeological expedition

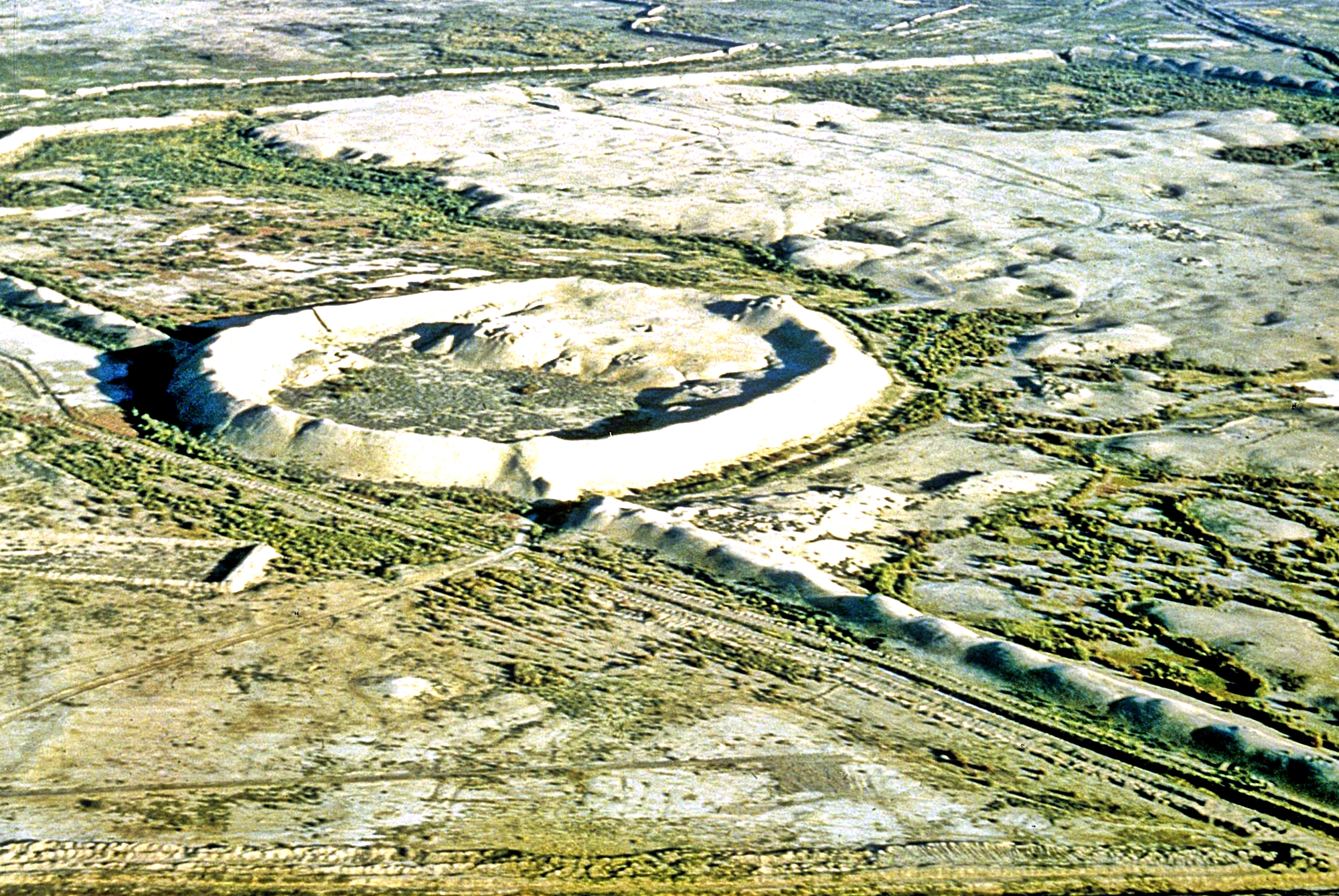
Part of Merv, ancient city in Central Asia, today in Turkmenistan.

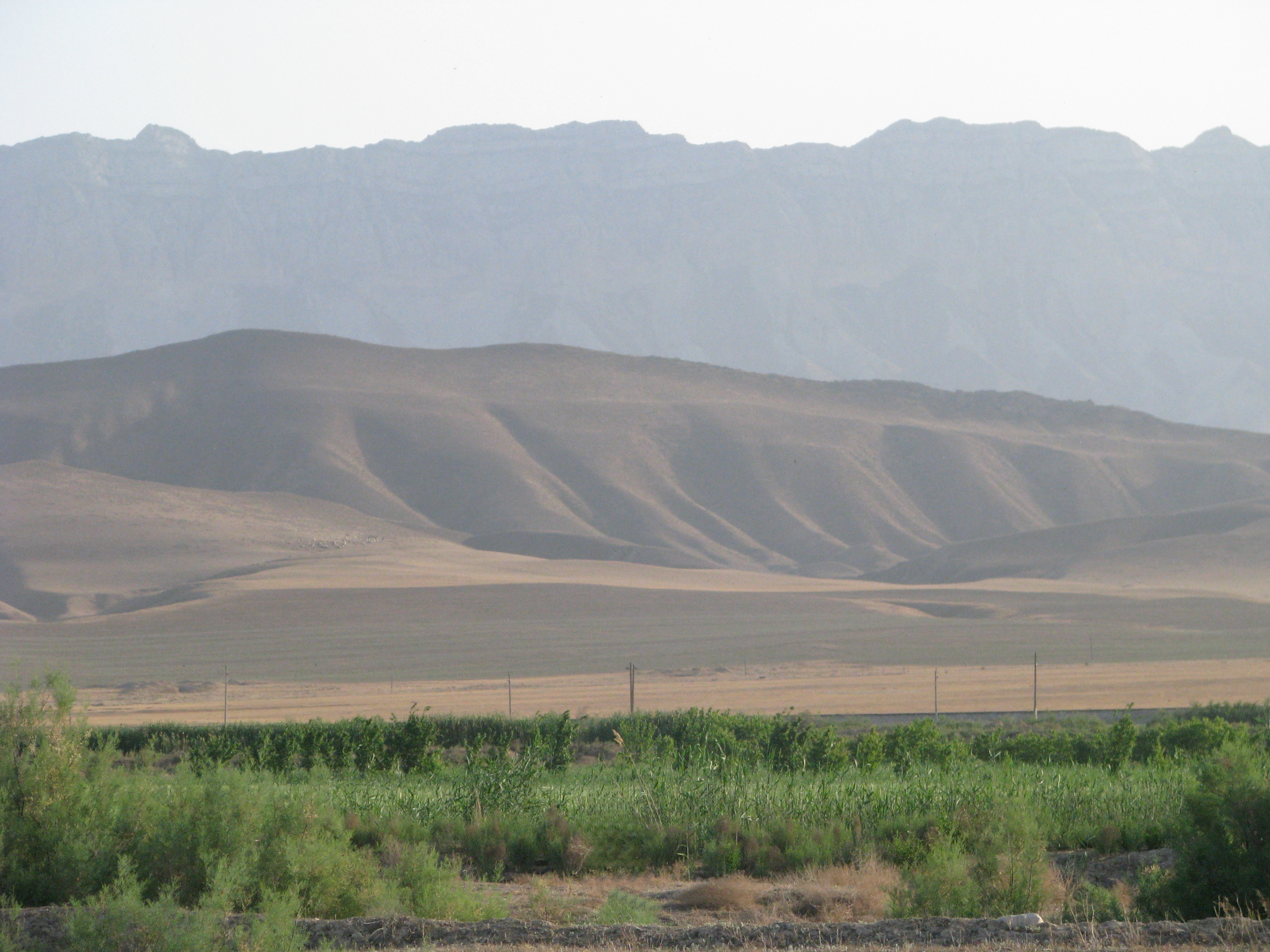
Kopetdag hill range on the frontier between Turkmenistan and Iran

The South Turkmenistan Complex Archaeological Expedition (STACE), also called the South Turkmenistan Archaeological Inter-disciplinary Expedition of the Academy of Sciences of the Turkmen Soviet Socialist Republic (YuTAKE) was endorsed by the Turkmenistan Academy of Sciences. It was initially organized by the orientalist Mikhail Evgenievich Masson in 1946. The expedition had several excavations or "Brigades", based on sites and periods, and were spread over many years.

The Chalcolithic settlements of southern Turkmenistan, according to Masson, date to the late 5th millennium – early 3rd millennium BC, as assessed by carbon dating and paleomagnetic studies of the findings from the excavations carried out by STACE in the Altyndepe and Tekkendepe. The foothills of the Kopetdag mountains have revealed the earliest village cultures of Central Asia in the areas of Namazga-Tepe (more than 50 ha) and Altyndepe (26 ha), Ulug Depe (20 ha), Kara Depe (15 ha), and Geoksyur Oasis (12 ha). In 1952, Boris Kuftin, established the basic Chalcolithics to Late Bronze Age sequence based on the excavations carried out at Namazga-Tepe (termed Namazga (NMG) I-VI).

However, the Chalcolithic period ended about 2700 BC due to natural factors of ecology, with the Geoksyur oasis becoming desertified. This resulted in the migration of people to the ancient delta of the Tedzhen River. This also led to the Early Bronze Age Settlements at Khapuz-depe.

== Geography ==
The geographical location of the explorations in southern Turkmenistan were not marked with precision. The Merv Oasis is one of the regions explored by Soviet archeologists of the YuTAKE; Antiochia is the primary site in this oasis. Namazgtepe ('tepe' means "hill") is 100–120 kilometers from Ashgabat in Turkmenistan at the border with Iran, southeast of the Caspian Sea. Excavations at this site have provided a chronological approach for Central Asia. Namazga-Tepewas the largest settlement found in the Kopetdag foothills, a range of hills extending up to the border with Iran.

== Participants ==
- Ovlyaguly Berdiyev
- Igor Khlopin
- Boris Kuftin
- Gorislava Lisitsyna
- Mikhail Masson
- Vadim Masson
- Gennady Markov
- Alexey Okladnikov
- Viktor Sarianidi

== History ==
The Merv Oasis had been extensively explored in 1904 by an American team; however, the reports published were of a preliminary nature. During the period 1940–1950, the Asian Republics started establishing archaeological institutions in their respective countries. Among them, the South Turkmenistan Complex Archaeological Expedition was established in 1946 by Masson under the aegis of the Turkmenistan Academy of Sciences to carry out explorations at several locations. These explorations included:

- 1947-1952: exploration by Alexey Okladnikov of Mesolithic sites
- 1940s and 1950s: Eneolithic and Bronze Age excavations by Boris Kuftin
- 1955-1962: excavations by V.M. Masson, I.N. Khlopin, and Viktor Sarianidi of Neolithic sites at many locations, including Jeitun at the Geoksur Oasis
- Since 1965: Bronze Age excavations by Masson covering, among others, the site at Altyndepe
- Excavations by G. N. Lisitsyna to investigate the prehistoric economies and irrigation systems.
- 1977-1992: explorations by Khlopin in the Sumbar Valley

Since 1992, excavations have been carried out by a joint project titled “Turkmen-British-Merv Project”. This has yielded historical data on fortifications and a residential complex of the Hellenistic, Parthina and Sassanian period.

== Excavations ==
The V Brigade uncovered peculiarities in metal composition during the Palaeo-Metallic epoch at the Allyn-Depe settlement.

The VII Brigade, carried out by Kuftin, was of the Namazgadepe explorations, which revealed six phases, sequentially deposited, and referred to as Namazga I to VI. It established the Chalcolithic (Eneolithic) to the late Bronze Age period. Between 1951 and 1961, the VII Brigade explored the Bronze Age site of Altyndepe (which had been discovered earlier by A.A. Semenov in 1929), Iron Age Yaz I complex in Margiana (old delta of the Morghab River, 11 sites at the ancient delta of the Geoksyur oasis, and Bronze Age piedmont sites in the Sumbar Valley with a noteworthy discovery of the Early Bronze Age cemetery of Parkhai II.

In the Margiana archaeological expeditions undertaken during the second phase, work was continued at the Auchindepe and Takirbaidepe, which revealed 100 Bronze Age sites and the settlement of Gomur I. Also explored were the sites at the southern and eastern Togolok and Gomur, and in the northern part of Kalleli group sites. The Jeitun Culture of the Kopetdag Neolithic sites were explored from 1963 to 1973.

The survey covered Jeitun Culture as a whole, and particular credit is given to the Turkmen archaeologist, O. K. Berdiev who died in an accident at a young age; his 10 years of explorations have been published under the title “The Most Ancient Agriculturalists of Southern Turkmenistan.” Neolithic pediment sites of Jeitun Culture extended from Bami in the west to the Meana Chacha district in the east.

In the explorations done at the north mound of Anau, excavation in the Komanov trench at the north end were subject to deep sounding which revealed consecutive layers of buildings. From this, a stratigraphic sequence of developments evolved with "craft production and social stratification".

== Caspian Mesolithic period ==
The IX Brigade, led by Okladnikov, worked in the Greater Balkan region of Turkmenistan, and in the plateau of Krasnovodsk. The finds at the Jebel rock shelter site near the Caspian Sea on the southwestern end of the Uly Balkan massif was a stratigraphic sequence of Mesolithic and Neolithic deposits, considered a model for the Turkmenistan Caspian Mesolithic period.

Two other sites, located in the southern escarpments of the Greater Balkan, were examined in great detail by G. E. Markov of Moscow State University; these were the Mesolithic sites of Dam-Dam Cheshme 1 and 2.

The XIV Brigade occurred in 1952 and researched primitive settled-agriculturalist settlement attributed to the Copper and Bronze periods.

== Namazga-Tepe ==
The explorations in the foothills of the Kopetdag revealed well developed irrigation systems with water control arrangements which resulted in prosperous, well settled large regional centres. The largest of these settlements is Namazga-Tepe with an area of 50 ha. The excavations done at this site lead to the discovery of six distinct periods. Named Namazgadepe I to VI, the periods extended over the late 5th millennium to early 3rd millennium BC. In the process of development over these centuries, the transition observed was from Chalcolithic period to Early Bronze Age with urban characteristics in the settlements. Dwelling houses also emerged from chaotically planned one room houses to larger houses with many rooms with the interiors painted (lac paintings) and with a hearth. Defensive forts were part of the settlements. Chalcolithic stone amulets with geometric shapes, pottery traditions with two-tiered furnaces for firing ceramics, terracotta figurines, stamp seals of clay and stone, and centres of metallurgical production were uncovered. Rosette and zoomorphic patterns were unearthed, representing various periods, both at Namazga-Tepe and also at other settlements in the foothills of the Kopetdag mountains. These are clearly indicative of the village cultures of Central Asia.

== Altyndepe ==
Kuftin was invited to Central Asia to carry out explorations in 1949. He first reconnoitered Turkmenistan and selected a very large tepe (hill), the Altyndepe (in Turkmen language meaning: the "Golden Hill" ). This tepe overlooks the Tedzen delta at the foot of Kopetdag. He found a Neolithic settlement extending into Bronze Age in southern Turkmenistan near the village of Miana, a settlement of 25 ha area with a total stratification thickness of 30 metres (98 ft) with an 8 metres (26 ft) strip of human habitation. This excavated tepe turned out to be a large settlement, 2.5 kilometres (1.6 mi) in length and 0.5 kilometres (0.31 mi) in width, and was identified as a major Bronze Age town. From the highest point of this tepe, a trench was dug to a depth of 30 metres (98 ft) and the section was logged, which revealed layers of the Bronze Age, of neolithic and Eneolithic periods. Ceramics collected from the different layers of the trench enabled Kuftin to establish the sequence and chronology of the findings. One year after he started sequencing the site, he died suddenly and was replaced by Vadim Mikhailovich Masson who published a book on the Bronze Age sequence of this site. The settlement of Ilgynly had also shifted to Altyndepe. Early Bronze period fort walls with decorated towers and a huge entrance had encircled this settlement, though when found, they were in ruins. Discoveries by Soviet archeologists dated the finds at this place, in a chronological order, to the later half of the third millennium BC. Altyn-Depe also provided a link to the several Bronze Age cultures of Eurasia.

The most notable findings in the burial ground of the elite, located in the outskirts of Altyndepe, were "a disk-like stone 'weight', a miniature column, more than 1500 beads, a steatite plate with an image of cross and half-moon, a moulded clay wolf, as well as a golden head of a bull with a turquoise sickle inlaid in the forehead".

Excavations revealed bone and copper artifacts of the fifth millennium BC (Neolithic period), female figurines painted with ornaments, and necklaces of the fourth million BC.

Brick walls of 1.5–2 metres (4 ft 11 in – 6 ft 7 in) thickness with brick kilns and a hearth in the middle of the house dated to early third millennium, and small temple buildings and rectangular hearths of Namazga V type of the middle third millennium were also found.

In the period from late third millennium to early second millennium, the antiquaries revealed an urban habitation with artisans' houses. Also unearthed were 62 double-tiered kilns, beads and seals.

Four stepped ziggurats were found. Further were revealed female terracotta figurines with plaited hair, stone vessels, hafted bronze and copper daggers with flat blades, tabbed silver and bronze seals.

The further findings were,

- Paintings of animals such as goats, eagles, and panthers.
- Three headed composite animal.
- A priest's tomb with gold heads of a wolf and a bull.
- Other tombs with silver ornaments, precious stones and seals.
- One quarter of a ‘nobility’ seal with two signs in Indus script conjectured to be that of Bronze Age settlers in Altyndepe.

However, the settlement gradually disappeared (it was deserted around 1600 BC) as a result of climatic changes; people migrated to the Mugrab region, another area of South Uzbekistan (Sapali), and Northern Afghanistan (Dashli). Further, these findings confirmed the Middle Asian interaction from the north to the Oxus civilization.

== Geoksyurtepe ==
Geoksyur Oasis, located in the foothills of the Kopetdag, to the east of Altyndepe, is in the center of a cluster of tepes in the desert region on the northern Iranian border. It extends over an area of 12 ha. It is 20 kilometres (12 mi) to the east of the city of Tedzhen. Even though in the Eneolithic Period (4th – early 3rd century BC), the space between houses was used for burials, the settlement was not a cemetery but rather a settlement which was affected by shifting sand dunes and scarcity of water. Geoksyur was revealed to contain "adobe multi-room houses and group burial chambers". Ceramics were also found with dichromatic paintings and many female terracotta figurines. The culture of Geoksyurtepe was correlated with an eastern Anau group of tribes linked to Elam and Mesopotamia.

== Gonurtepe ==
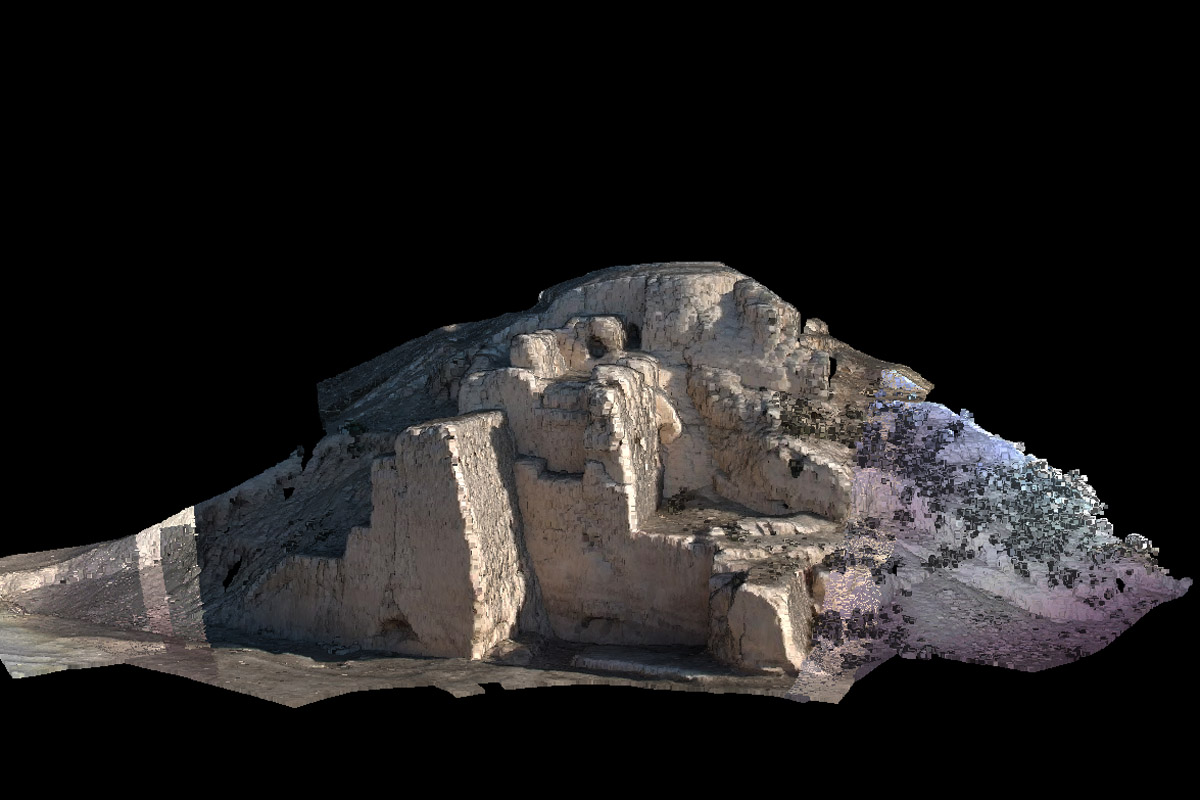
Photo-textured 3D laser scan image of the town walls of the city of Gyaur Kala, an 8 km circuit, constructed in the 3rd century BCE

According to the Greek-Russian archaeologist, Sarianidi, who explored the tepes, Gonurtepe was the "capital or the imperial city of a complex Bronze Age state, one that stretched at least a thousand square miles and encompassing hundreds of satellite settlements". He also called it the "world's fifth center of ancient civilization" with its refined society called the "Turkmenistan's Morghab River society", formally called the "Bactria-Margiana Archaeological Complex". It is said to be in league with the "cultural cradles of antiquity" of Egypt, Mesopotamia, India, and China.

The meandering Morghab River along which the Morghab civilization developed by Gonurdepe and Merv, which was once an important place along the Silk Route. But the river flows through the regional capital city of Mary, about 40 miles away from the exploration site of Gonurtepe.

The site is dated to late 3rd millennium BC. Excavations have taken place for more than 35 years and still continue at a slow pace due to a lack of adequate funding. The main findings of the excavations are that the site was "an agricultural and herding community who grew grain, raised sheep, built sophisticated irrigation and sewage systems, and produced ceramics in the many kilns that dot the landscape."

A fort had been built with thick walls and the enclosed area within the fort had single storied houses, and also a palace, two observatories and cremation grounds. The excavation of the cemeteries revealed many objects, both local and imported (from Indus Valley and Egypt).

Religious practices indicated that it was the birthplace of the Zoroastrian religion, a monolithic religion. The practices of sheep sacrifices, temples dedicated to fire and water, drinking of soma-haoma (a brew presumed to be made of opium, ephedra, and a local narcotic) have been deduced as practices followed by Zoroastrians.
