= Monjukli Depe =

Ancient settlement in south Turkmenistan

Coordinates: 36.848333°N 60.417778°E

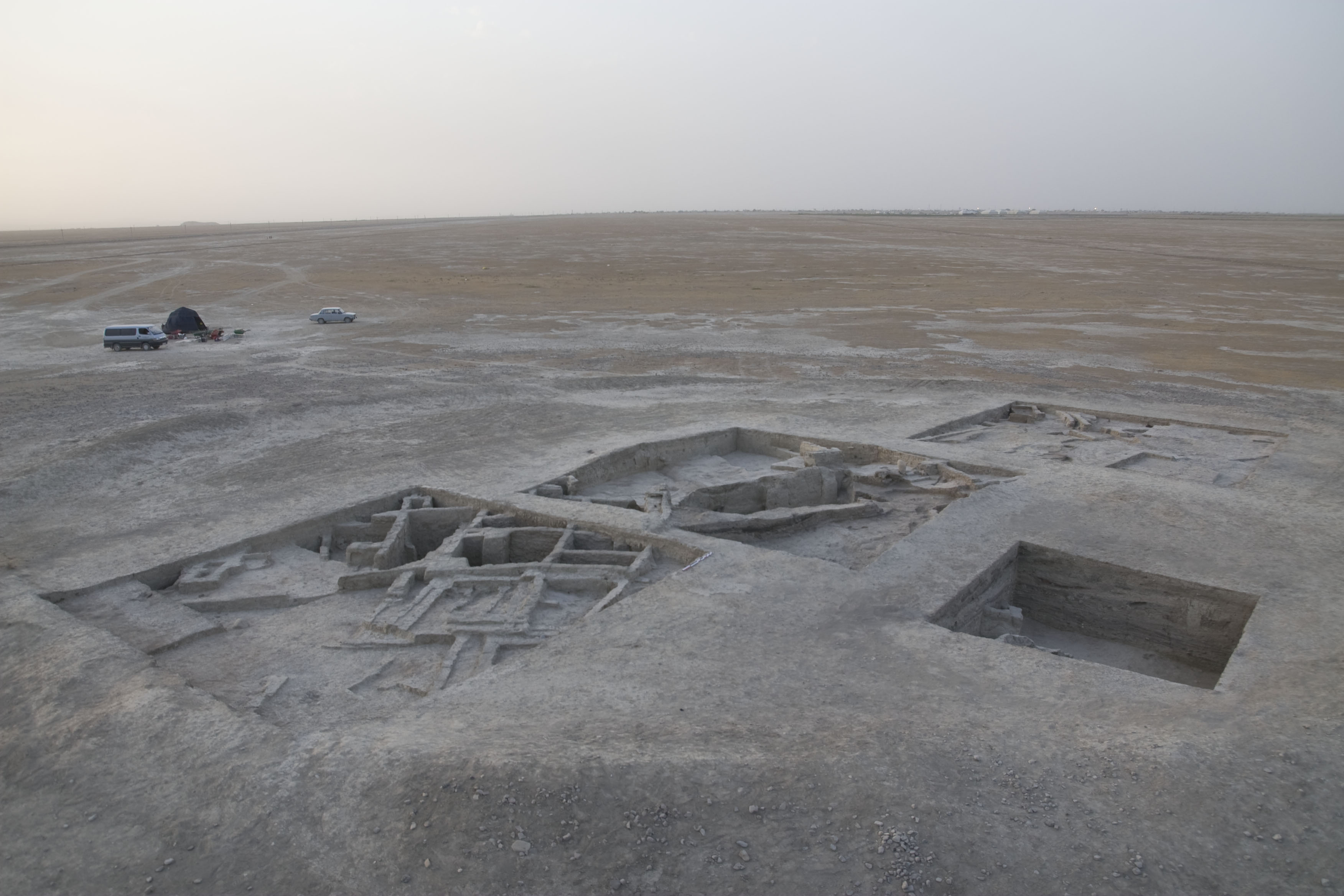
- View from the southeast (Units B, C, D and E)
- Type: Ancient settlement
- Cultures: Jeitun culture
- Location: South Turkmenistan, northern edge of the Kopet Dag mountains

History
- Built: c. 6200 BC (late Neolithic period)

Site notes
- Excavation dates: 1959, 2010–2014
- Condition: Ruins

Monjukli Depe is an ancient settlement in south Turkmenistan, at the northern edge of the Kopet Dag mountains. Excavations reveal occupation from the Late Neolithic period, starting about 6200 BC, to the early Chalcolithic period. The earliest layers belong to the Jeitun culture of Turkmenistan.

The prehistoric settlement lies in an arid alluvial plain, which is bordered in the north by the Karakum desert and in the south by the slopes of the Kopet Dag. The mountains also mark today's political border with Iran.

About two kilometers northwest of the site runs the dry bed of Meana river, where the modern village of Miana, Turkmenistan is located.

The large Bronze Age settlement of Altyn Depe is located about 2km to the northeast.

== Excavations ==
The first excavations by Aleksandr A. Marushchenko took place in 1959, and were later continued by his colleague O. K. Berdiev. The results of this first investigation were compiled in a preliminary report. In 2010, the potential of the excavation site was recognized by Susan Pollock and Reinhard Bernbeck, and this led to five further excavation campaigns (2010–2014) on site.

== Chronology ==
The location is important for establishing the regional chronology, because here the Neolithic layers are followed by the Chalcolithic. However, in 2010, the subsequent excavations have found a long settlement break between the end of the Neolithic settlement (layers XV, 6200–5600 BCE) and the Chalcolithic resettlement (layers IV to I, 4650–4340 BCE). Based on this, the "Meana horizon" was defined here, which appears to be limited regionally to the Kaka District of Turkmenistan, and precedes the Anau culture IA phase.

== Chalcolithic settlement ==
Layers IV to I were excavated over a large area. They contain standardized houses with a square floor plan, and pillars in the middle of rooms. In the top two layers, an enclosed open space was identified, in which, judging by the animal bones found here, the banquets took place.

In the lowest layer IV, a house with a wall painting was found portraying two persons, also featuring some abstract patterns.

The residents of Monjukli Depes lived from herding and agriculture. Sheep and goats were dominant among the herd animals. Cattle, as well as their skulls, played an important role in the banquets. In so far as the wild animals, remains of gazelles and onagers were found.

Barley and wheat were important in arable farming, with the analyzes potentially indicating simple irrigation.

Very little ceramic was produced in the Chalcolithic Monjukli Depe. On a general level, there are ceramic parallels to the Sialk II / Cheshme Ali horizon of the Iranian highlands.

== See also ==
- Bactria–Margiana Archaeological Complex
- South Turkmenistan Complex Archaeological Expedition

== Literature ==
- Reinhard Bernbeck, Susan Pollock: Scalar Differences: Temporal Rhythms and Spatial Patterns at Monjukli Depe, Southern Turkmenistan. In: Antiquity 90 (349), 2016, S. 64–80 doi:10.15184/aqy.2015.197
- Susan Pollock, Reinhard Bernbeck, Brian Beckers, de:Norbert Benecke, Jonas Berking, Gabriela Castro Gessner, Jana Eger, Birgül Öğüt: Archaeological Work at Monjukli Depe: A Regional Perspective. In: Archäologische Mitteilungen aus Iran und Turan, Band 47, 2018, S. 1–47
- Susan Pollock, Reinhard Bernbeck, Birgül Öğüt (Hrsg.): Looking Closely. Excavations at Monjukli Depe, Turkmenistan, 2010–2014 Sidestone Press, Leiden 2019
- Jana Eger, Corinna Knipper, Norbert Benecke: Stable Isotope Evidence for Animal Husbandry Practices at Prehistoric Monjukli Depe, Southern Turkmenistan, erscheint in: Archaeozoology of the Near East XIII. Proceedings of the Thirteenth International Symposium on the Archaeozoology of Southwestern Asia and Adjacent Areas, Nicosia.
- David R. Harris: Origins of Agriculture in Western Central Asia: An Environmental-Archaeological Study. University of Pennsylvania Press, Philadelphia 2010
- Fredrik T. Hiebert, The Kopet Dag Sequence of Early Villages in Central Asia. In: Paléorient 28 (2), 2002, S. 25–41
- Herrmann Müller-Karpe: Neolithische Siedlungen der Dzejtun-Kultur in Süd-Turkmenistan. C.H. Beck, München 1982
- Raphael Pumpelly: Explorations in Turkestan, Expedition of 1904: Prehistoric Civilizations of Anau, Origins, Growth, and Influence of Environment. Volume 1, Carnegie Institution of Washington, Washington 1908
