= Gashnuiyeh =

Gashnuiyeh or Goshnuiyeh (Persian: گشنوئيه), also rendered as Gushnuyeh and Gashnooeyeh, may refer to:

- Gashnuiyeh-ye Bala
- Gashnuiyeh-ye Pain
