= Tarom, Hormozgan =

Tarom طارم
- Village
- Location within Iran
- Coordinates: 28°09′03″N 55°44′47″E
- Country: Iran
- Province: Hormozgan
- County: Hajjiabad
- Bakhsh: Central
- Rural District: Tarom

Population (2006)
  - Total: 884
- Time zone: UTC+3:30 (IRST)
  - Summer (DST): UTC+4:30 (IRDT)

Tarom (Persian: طارم, also Romanized as Ţārom; also known as Tarum) is a village in Tarom Rural District, in the Central District of Hajjiabad County, Hormozgan Province, Iran. At the 2006 census, its population was 884, in 209 families.
