= Tang-e Quchan, Hormozgan =

Tang-e Quchan تنگ قوچان
- Village
- Location within Iran
- Coordinates: 28°42′14″N 55°38′13″E
- Country: Iran
- Province: Hormozgan
- County: Hajjiabad
- Bakhsh: Central
- Rural District: Dar Agah

Population (2006)
  - Total: 28
- Time zone: UTC+3:30 (IRST)
  - Summer (DST): UTC+4:30 (IRDT)

Tang-e Quchan (Persian: تنگ قوچان, also Romanized as Tang-e Qūchān and Tang Qūchān) is a village in Dar Agah Rural District, in the Central District of Hajjiabad County, Hormozgan Province, Iran. At the 2006 census, its population was 28, in 5 families.
