= Galehgah, Hormozgan =

Galehgah گله گاه
- Village
- Location within Iran
- Coordinates: 28°03′00″N 55°33′00″E
- Country: Iran
- Province: Hormozgan
- County: Hajjiabad
- Bakhsh: Central
- Rural District: Tarom

Population (2006)
  - Total: 253
- Time zone: UTC+3:30 (IRST)
  - Summer (DST): UTC+4:30 (IRDT)

Galehgah (Persian: گله گاه, also Romanized as Galehgāh; also known as Galāgāh and Galū Gāh) is a village in Tarom Rural District, in the Central District of Hajjiabad County, Hormozgan Province, Iran. At the 2006 census, its population was 253, in 53 families.
