= Lardgaram-e Bala =

Lardgaram-e Bala لردگرم بالا
- Village
- Country: Iran
- Province: Hormozgan
- County: Hajjiabad
- Bakhsh: Central
- Rural District: Tarom

Population (2006)
  - Total: 46
- Time zone: UTC+3:30 (IRST)
  - Summer (DST): UTC+4:30 (IRDT)

Lardgaram-e Bala (Persian: لردگرم بالا, also Romanized as Lardgaram-e Bālā) is a village in Tarom Rural District, in the Central District of Hajjiabad County, Hormozgan Province, Iran. At the 2006 census, its population was 46, in 10 families.
