= Sarchahan =

Village in Hormozgan province, Iran

Sarchahan Persian: سرچاهان
- Village
- Location within Iran
- Coordinates: 28°03′41″N 55°52′43″E
- Country: Iran
- Province: Hormozgan
- County: Hajjiabad
- District: Central
- Rural District: Tarom

Population (2016)
  - Total: 2,250
- Time zone: UTC+3:30 (IRST)

Sarchahan (Persian: سرچاهان) (Note: Also romanized as Sarchāhān) is a village in Tarom Rural District of the Central District of Hajjiabad County, Hormozgan province, Iran.

== Demographics ==
=== Population ===
At the time of the 2006 National Census, the village's population was 2,255 in 514 households. The following census in 2011 counted 2,319 people in 636 households. The 2016 census measured the population of the village as 2,250 people in 700 households. It was the most populous village in its rural district.
