= Galleh Gah =

Galleh Gah or Galehgah (Persian: گله گه or گله گاه) may refer to:

- Galehgah, Hormozgan (گله گاه - Galehgāh)
- Galleh Gah, Andimeshk, Khuzestan Province (گله گه - Galleh Gah)
- Galleh Gah, Lorestan (گله گه - Galleh Gah)
