= Tang-e Quchan =

Tang-e Quchan or Tang Quchan (Persian: تنگ قوچان) may refer to:

- Tang-e Quchan, Hormozgan
- Tang-e Quchan, Kerman
