= Gashnuiyeh-ye Pain =

Gashnuiyeh-ye Pain گشنوئيه پائين
- Village
- Location within Iran
- Coordinates: 28°32′57″N 55°43′00″E
- Country: Iran
- Province: Hormozgan
- County: Hajjiabad
- Bakhsh: Central
- Rural District: Dar Agah

Population (2006)
  - Total: 14
- Time zone: UTC+3:30 (IRST)
  - Summer (DST): UTC+4:30 (IRDT)

Gashnuiyeh-ye Pain (Persian: گشنوئيه پائين, also Romanized as Gashnū’īyeh-ye Pā’īn and Goshnū’īyeh-ye Pā’īn; also known as Gashnoo’eyeh, Gashnū’īyeh, and Gūshnūyeh-ye Pā’īn) is a village in Dar Agah Rural District, in the Central District of Hajjiabad County, Hormozgan Province, Iran. At the 2006 census, its population was 14, in 4 families.
