= Dehestan-e Pain =

Dehestan-e Pain دهستان پایین
- Village
- Location within Iran
- Coordinates: 28°28′34″N 55°34′55″E
- Country: Iran
- Province: Hormozgan
- County: Hajjiabad
- Bakhsh: Central
- Rural District: Dar Agah

Population (2006)
  - Total: 884
- Time zone: UTC+3:30 (IRST)
  - Summer (DST): UTC+4:30 (IRDT)

Dehestan-e Pain (Persian: دهستان پایین, also Romanized as Dehestān-e Pā’īn or Dehesān-e Pāyīn) is a village in Dar Agah Rural District, in the Central District of Hajjiabad County, Hormozgan Province, Iran. At the 2006 census, its population was 884, in 194 families.
