= Lardgaram-e Pain =

Lardgaram-e Pain لردگرم پائين
- Village
- Country: Iran
- Province: Hormozgan
- County: Hajjiabad
- Bakhsh: Central
- Rural District: Tarom

Population (2006)
  - Total: 42
- Time zone: UTC+3:30 (IRST)
  - Summer (DST): UTC+4:30 (IRDT)

Lardgaram-e Pain (Persian: لردگرم پائين, also Romanized as Lardgaram-e Pā’īn) is a village in Tarom Rural District, in the Central District of Hajjiabad County, Hormozgan Province, Iran. At the 2006 census, its population was 42, in 11 families.
