= Qalatuiyeh-ye Tang-e Salehi =

Qalatuiyeh-ye Tang-e Salehi قلاتوييه تنگ صالحي
- Village
- Location within Iran
- Coordinates: 28°32′11″N 55°43′38″E
- Country: Iran
- Province: Hormozgan
- County: Hajjiabad
- Bakhsh: Central
- Rural District: Dar Agah

Population (2006)
  - Total: 40
- Time zone: UTC+3:30 (IRST)
  - Summer (DST): UTC+4:30 (IRDT)

Qalatuiyeh-ye Tang-e Salehi (Persian: قلاتوييه تنگ صالحي, also Romanized as Qalātū’īyeh-ye Tang-e Şāleḥī; also known as Faleh Tū’īd, Qalātū, and Qalātū’īyeh) is a village in Dar Agah Rural District, in the Central District of Hajjiabad County, Hormozgan Province, Iran. At the 2006 census, its population was 40, in 9 families.
