= Qalatuiyeh, Hormozgan =

Qalatuiyeh قلاتوييه
- Village
- Location within Iran
- Coordinates: 28°24′41″N 55°42′44″E
- Country: Iran
- Province: Hormozgan
- County: Hajjiabad
- Bakhsh: Central
- Rural District: Dar Agah

Population (2006)
  - Total: 118
- Time zone: UTC+3:30 (IRST)
  - Summer (DST): UTC+4:30 (IRDT)

Qalatuiyeh (Persian: قلاتوييه, also Romanized as Qalātū’īyeh; also known as Qalātū) is a village in Dar Agah Rural District, in the Central District of Hajjiabad County, Hormozgan Province, Iran. At the 2006 census, its population was 118, in 35 families.
