= Kutlug-Tepe =

Archaeological site in Afghanistan

Kutlug-Tepe is an archaeological mine site in the north of Afghanistan, in ancient Bactria.

== Description ==
Kutlug-Tepe is a fortification dating from the first millennium BC, during the time of the Achaemenid Empire in Bactria province. It is about a kilometer away from the remains of a village and entails a hill that is 40 by 40 metres (130 ft × 130 ft) in extent and 4 metres (13 ft) high.

The building is round and has three outer walls; the spaces between the walls form two galleries or corridors. The walls have openings to light the galleries and were once vaulted. In the two inner walls there is a passage and on the east side of the outer wall there is a rounded tower. It encloses a round courtyard in which stands a rectangular building. The building is poorly maintained but features an altar that may indicate the whole complex is a temple rather than a fortress.

== Literature ==
Viktor Sarianidi: The Art of Old Afghanistan, Leipzig 1986, pp. 72–75 ISBN 3-527-17561-X
