= Taram =

Taram may refer to:

- Taram language, of Nigeria
- Taram, Iran (disambiguation), places in Iran
- Taram, West Sumatra, a village
