= Daschly =

Daschly (Dasli)
- Interactive map of Daschly (Dasli)
- 37.0917°N 66.4083°E
- Type: Ancient oasis
- Location: North of Afghanistan, Jowzjan Province

History
- Built: Middle of the second millennium BC

Site notes
- Condition: Ruins

Daschly (Dasli) is an oasis in the north of Afghanistan which is on the south side of Amu Darya located in the Jowzjan Province. During archaeological investigations, 41 ancient sites were located here which two of these sites are of particular importance.

Daschly 1 is a 99 x 85 m large castle with round corner towers and has about 3 to 4 m high walls that once perhaps were up to 8 m high. Inside the walling there are remains of what was presumably a completely roofed-over dense building, with no alleys or paths. In addition to the castle, there are remains of a town that was once probably inhabited by local rulers.

Daschly 3 (37/07 N - 66/26 E) was a big palace of about 88 × 84 m high. It had a square interior with residential buildings and fortified outer walls that were laid out in a T-shape. After this palace was abandoned, a rectangular castle with a side length of about 150 × 130 m high with surroundings of deep moats was built here. Inside it there is a dense development that leaves hardly any space for paths or alleys. The interior is divided by three walls. In the center there is a heavily fortified building, which once might have been a palace. Around the environment outside of the castle there are two more round wall rings, each separating one residential area from the next.

The complexes probably date to the middle of the second millennium BC and belong to the oasis culture.

== Literature ==
• Viktor Sarianidi : The Art of Old Afghanistan, Leipzig 1986, pp. 56–65 ISBN 3-527-17561-X
