= Hajjiabad Castle =

Castle in Hormozgan Province, Iran

Hajjiabad castle
- قلعه حاجی‌آباد

General information
- Type: Castle
- Location: Hajjiabad County, Iran

Hajjiabad castle (Persian: قلعه حاجی‌آباد) is a historical castle located in Hajjiabad County in Hormozgan Province, The longevity of this fortress dates back to the Ilkhanate, Timurid Empire and Safavid Empire.
