= Dehestan-e Bala =

Village in Hormozgan province, Iran

Dehestan-e Bala Persian: دهستان بالا
- Village
- Location within Iran
- Coordinates: 28°28′27″N 55°34′17″E
- Country: Iran
- Province: Hormozgan
- County: Hajjiabad
- District: Central
- Rural District: Daragah

Population (2016)
  - Total: 575
- Time zone: UTC+3:30 (IRST)

Dehestan-e Bala (Persian: دهستان بالا) (Note: Also romanized as Dehestān-e Bālā; also known as Dehistān and Ḩoseynābād) is a village in, and the capital of, Daragah Rural District of the Central District of Hajjiabad County, Hormozgan province, Iran.

== Demographics ==
=== Population ===
At the time of the 2006 National Census, the village's population was 710 in 163 households. The following census in 2011 counted 539 people in 152 households. The 2016 census measured the population of the village as 575 people in 175 households.
