= Peltasta pseudozonula =

Scientific classification
- Domain: Eukaryota
- Kingdom: Animalia
- Phylum: Arthropoda
- Class: Insecta
- Order: Lepidoptera
- Family: Gelechiidae
- Genus: Peltasta
- Species: P. pseudozonula

Binomial name
- Peltasta pseudozonula (Kuznetsov, 1960)

Synonyms
- Borkhausenia pseudozonula Kuznetsov, 1960; Brachmia pseudozonula

Species of moth

Peltasta pseudozonula is a moth of the family Gelechiidae. It was described by Vladimir Ivanovitsch Kuznetsov in 1960. It is found in Turkmenistan (western Kopet-Dagh) and northern Iran.

Adults are known from the western Kopet Dag, where it occurs in desert habitats at elevations between 400 and 500 meters from mid-April to mid-May.
