= Altyndepe =

Archaeological site in Turkmenistan

- Алтын-Депе (Turkmen)
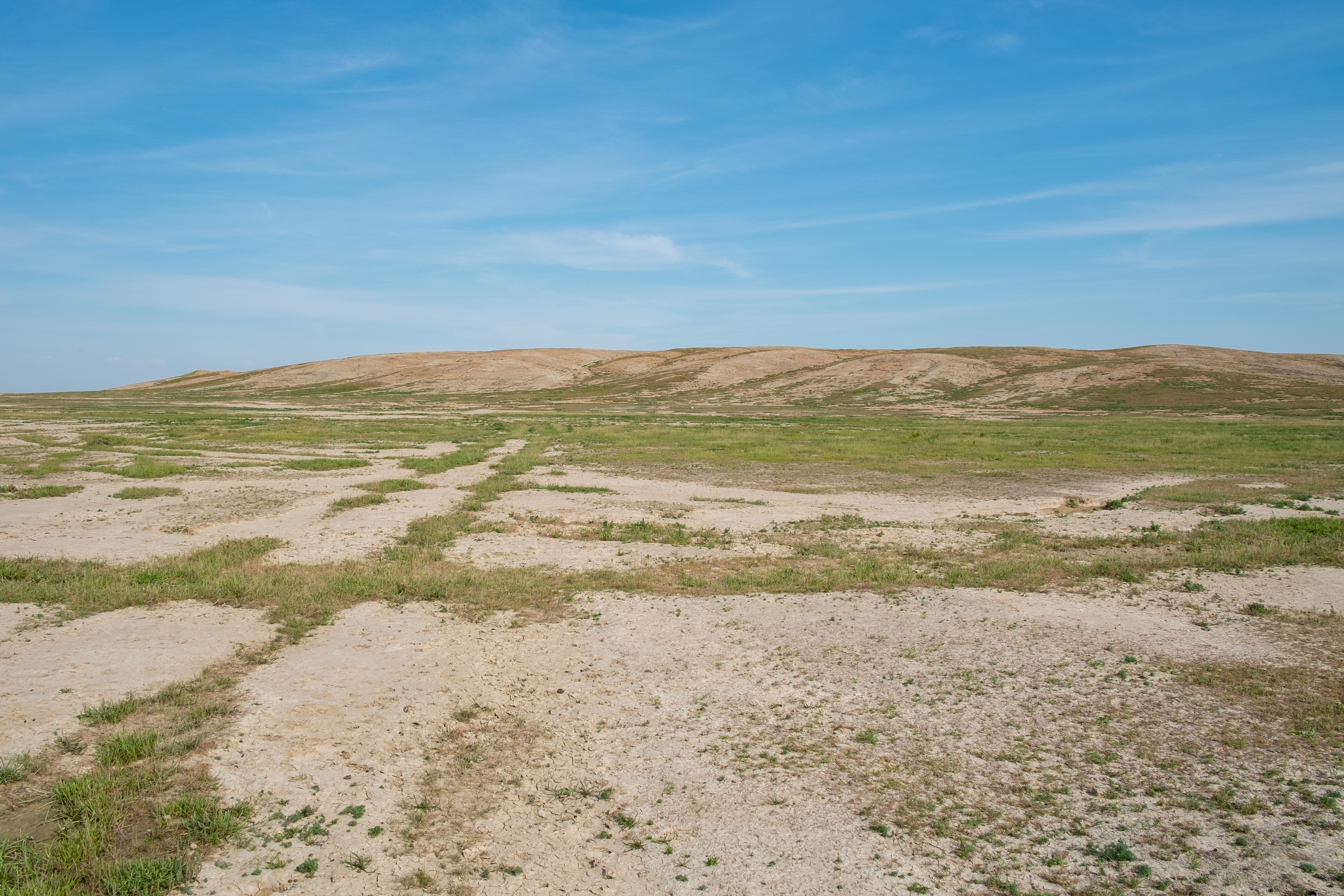
- The site in 2019

- Location in Turkmenistan
- 36°51′28.50″N 60°25′56.55″E
- Type: Settlement
- Location: Ahal, Turkmenistan

History
- Built: c. 3200 BC
- Abandoned: c. 2000 BC

Site notes
- Area: 25 ha (62 acres)
- Condition: Ruins

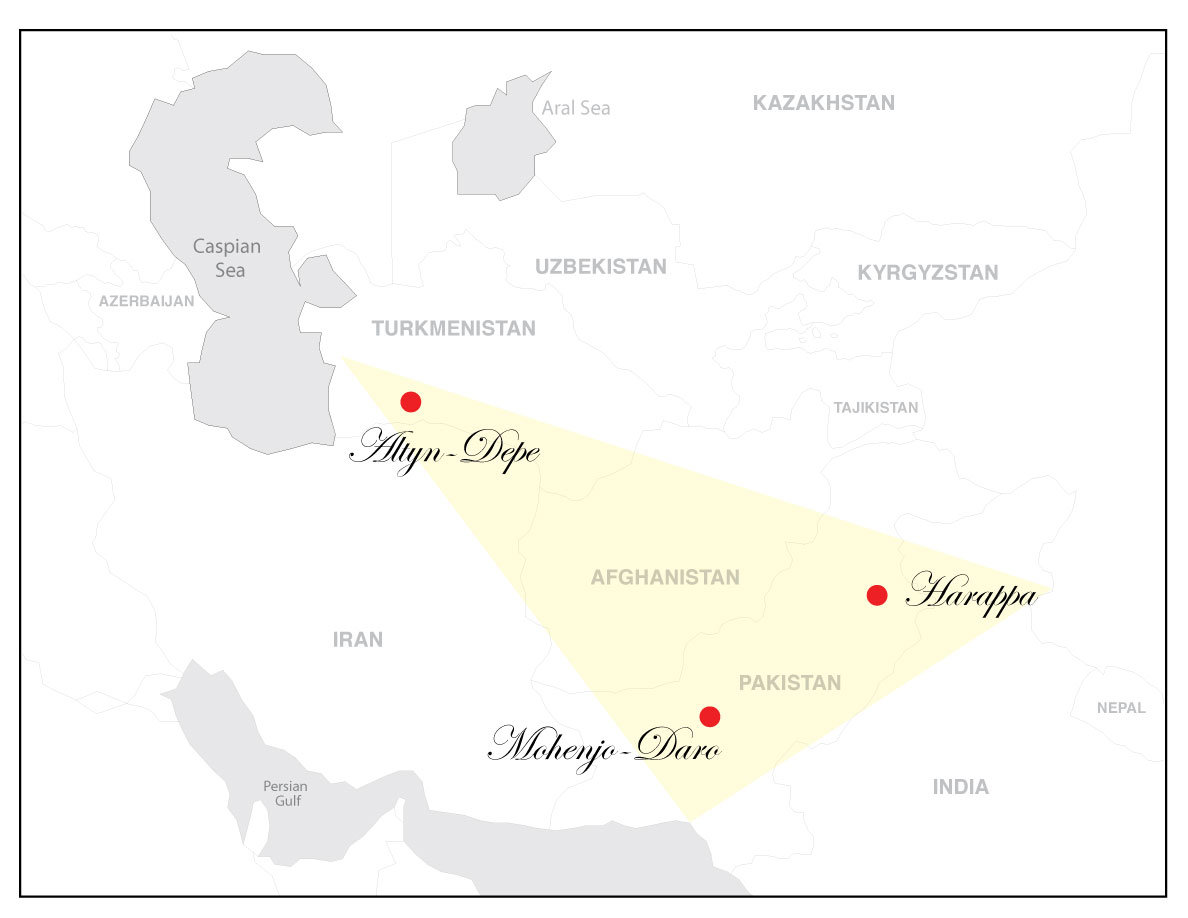
Altyndepe location on the modern Middle East map, also other Eneolithic cultures (Harappa and Mohenjo-daro)

Altyndepe (Алтын-Депе, sometimes Altyn Tepe, Turkmen "Golden Hill"), is a Bronze Age (BMAC) archaeological site in Turkmenistan, near Aşgabat, inhabited first from c. 3200 to 2400 BC in the Late Regionalization Era, and from c. 2400 to 2000 BC in the Integration Era as a full urban site.

== Excavations ==
Large-scale excavations at Altyn-depe started in 1965.

During the late Chalcolithic period, Altyn Depe became a large-scale center with an area of 25 hectares. It was surrounded by an adobe wall with rectangular watch towers. Several living quarters were uncovered. The area called Excavation 9 was a living quarter with several houses, many of them perhaps belonging to wealthy people. The houses had courtyards and street were running between them. People were often buried within houses. At Excavation 5 and Excavation 10 two other larger parts of living quarters were found. Those belong more likely to craftsmen. The houses are smaller and not so well built.

== Ziggurat ==
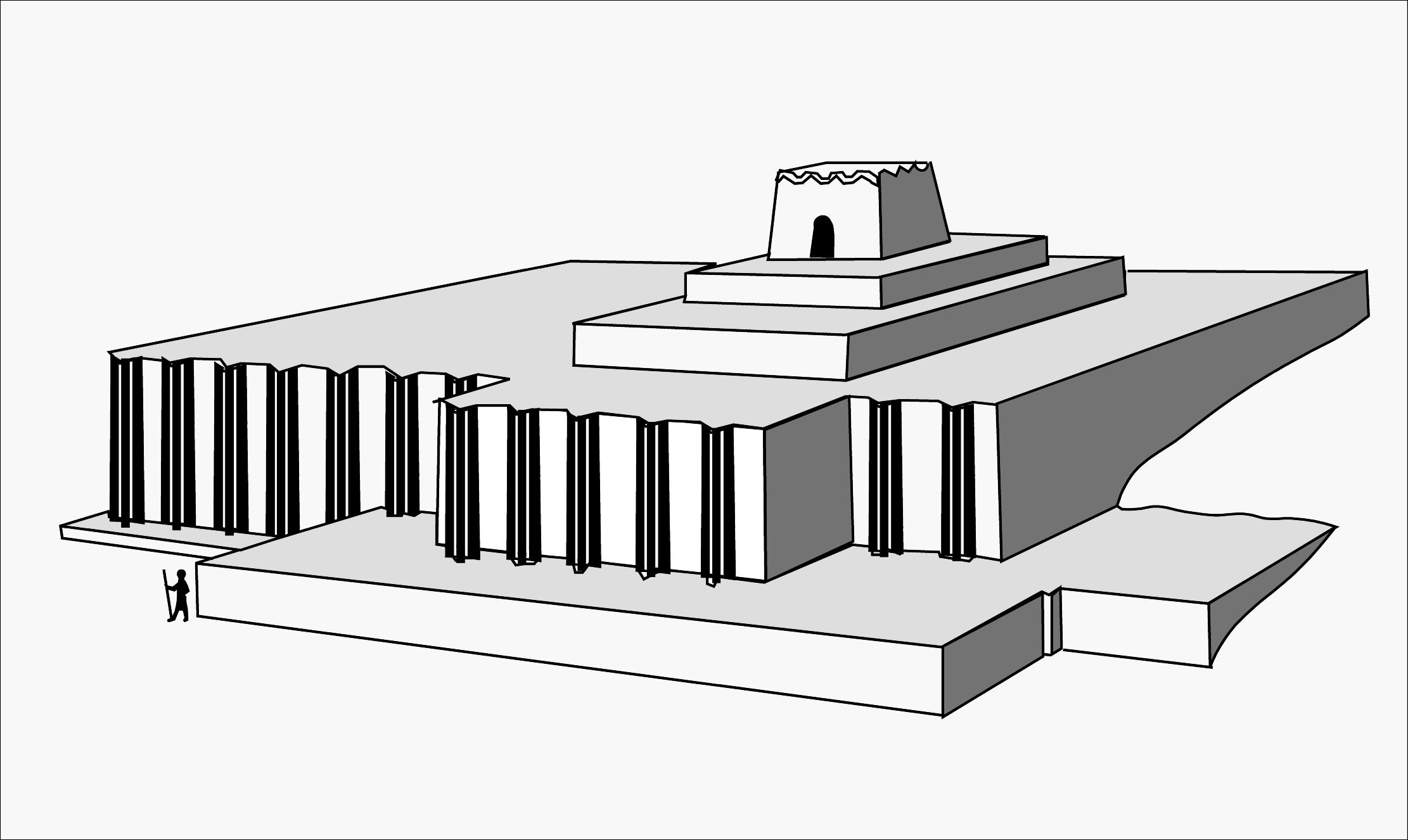
Ziggurat from Altyndepe, reconstruction

The site is notable for the remains of its ziggurat. This was a monumental religious complex with a four-level tower of the Mesopotamian ziggurat type. This construction has also been described as "proto-Zoroastrian".

There were also other Mesopotamian connections,

"The Altyn Depe civilization was in close contact with neighboring cultures. Sulfur-glazed vessels (Tepe Hissar, Tureng Tepe) obviously brought in from northeastern Iran turned up during the excavations in the aristocratic sector."

Namazga V and Altyndepe were also in contact with the Late Harappan culture (c. 2000–1600 BC). In Altyn Depe, many Indus Valley items were found, including objects made of ivory, and stamp seals of the Harappian type. At least one item contained Harappian writing.

Masson (1988) views the culture as having a Proto-Dravidian affiliation. Also, Sarianidi affiliates the site with Indo Iranians.

== Two-wheeled carts ==
Models of two-wheeled carts from c. 3000 BC found at Altyn-Depe are the earliest complete evidence of wheeled transport in Central Asia, though model wheels have come from contexts possibly somewhat earlier. Judging by the type of harness, carts were initially pulled by oxen, or a bull. However camels were domesticated within the BMAC. A model of a four-wheeled wagon drawn by a camel of c. 2200 BC was found at Altyn-Depe.

Monjukli Depe, another important ancient settlement is located nearby.

== See also ==
- Anau culture
- Jeitun
- South Turkmenistan Complex Archaeological Expedition
