= Tashkuiyeh =

Tashkuiyeh (Persian: تاشكوييه or طاشكوييه) may refer to:

- Tashkuiyeh, Hormozgan (طاشكوييه - Ţāshkūīyeh)
- Tashkuiyeh, Yazd (تاشكوييه - Tāshkūiyeh)
