= Kaheh =

Kaheh or Kahah (Persian: كاهه or كهه) may refer to:

- Kaheh, Hormozgan (كهه - Kaheh)
- Kaheh, Razavi Khorasan (كاهه - Kāheh)
- Kaheh, Sabzevar, Razavi Khorasan Province (كاهه - Kāheh)
