= Tashkuiyeh, Hormozgan =

Village in Hormozgan province, Iran

Tashkuiyeh Persian: طاشكوييه
- Village
- Location within Iran
- Coordinates: 28°08′21″N 55°26′45″E
- Country: Iran
- Province: Hormozgan
- County: Hajjiabad
- District: Central
- Rural District: Tarom

Population (2016)
  - Total: 1,832
- Time zone: UTC+3:30 (IRST)

Tashkuiyeh (Persian: طاشكوييه) (Note: Also romanized as Ţāshkūīyeh) is a village in, and the capital of, Tarom Rural District of the Central District of Hajjiabad County, Hormozgan province, Iran.

== Demographics ==
=== Population ===
At the time of the 2006 National Census, the village's population was 2,011 in 460 households. The following census in 2011 counted 2,239 people in 588 households. The 2016 census measured the population of the village as 1,832 people in 562 households.
