= Baviyeh =

Baviyeh or Buyeh (Persian: بويه) may refer to:

- Buyeh, Gilan
- Baviyeh, Hormozgan
