= At-Tschapar =

Archaeological site in Afghanistan

- Location: Northern Afghanistan

History
- Built: Middle of the first millennium BCE
- Excavation dates: Pottery found from the Achaemenid period

Site notes
- Diameter: Approximately 100 meters

At-Tschapar is an archaeological site in the north of Afghanistan.

== Description ==
The At-Tschapar tower was built in the middle of the first millennium BCE. It has a diameter of about 100 metres (330 ft). The interior of the structure is completely undeveloped. One of the outer walls of the tower has an inside corridor and on the outside of it there are a series of semicircular towers that are accessible from the corridor through the doors. Along the exterior facades there are loopholes. From the corridor there are passages that go into a large, undeveloped inside courtyard. During the excavation pottery was found from the Achaemenid period. The function of the tower is unclear. It may have been a fortress or a sanctuary, or the construction may never have been completed.

== Literature ==
- Viktor Sarianidi: The Art of Old Afghanistan, Leipzig 1986, pp. 75–78 ISBN 3-527-17561-X
