= Dahae =

Ancient Iranian people of Central Asia

Dahae Daae
- People
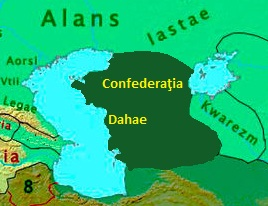
- Location: present-day west and northwest Turkmenistan, far southwest Kazakhstan and far west Uzbekistan (most of the Ustyurt Plateau)
- Branches: Parni, Xanthii and Pissuri

The Dahae, also known as the Daae, Dahas or Dahaeans (Old Persian: 𐎭𐏃𐎠, romanized: Dahā; Ancient Greek: Δαοι, romanized: Daoi; Δααι, Daai; Δαι, Dai; Δασαι, Dasai; Latin: Dahae; Chinese: 大益; pinyin: Dàyì; Persian: داه‍ان Dāhān) were a nomadic tribal confederation that inhabited the steppes of Central Asia. They are generally believed to have spoken an Eastern Iranian language, and may have been a sub-group of the ancient Iranian peoples – although there are no surviving first-hand accounts from the Dahae themselves.

== Identification ==
The Dahae may have been the Dāha- (𐬛𐬁𐬵𐬀) or Dåŋha- (𐬛𐬂𐬢𐬵𐬀) people mentioned in the Frawardin Yasht as one of the five peoples following the Zoroastrian religion, along with the Aⁱriia- (𐬀𐬌𐬭𐬌𐬌𐬀), Tūⁱriia- (𐬙𐬏𐬌𐬭𐬌𐬌𐬀), Saⁱrima- (𐬯𐬀𐬌𐬭𐬌𐬨𐬀), and Sāinu- (𐬯𐬁𐬌𐬥𐬎), although this identification is uncertain.

The Iranologist János Harmatta has identified the Dahā with the Massagetae/Sakā tigraxaudā based on ancient Graeco-Roman authors' mention of the Sakā tigraxaudā as living between the Amu Darya and Syr Darya rivers, where Arrian also located the Massagetae and the Dahae. The scholars A. Abetekov and H. Yusupov have also suggested that the Dahā were a constituent tribe of the Massagetae.

The scholar Y. A. Zadneprovskiy has instead suggested that the Dahae were descendants of the Massagetae.

The scholar Marek Jan Olbrycht, who has also identified the Massagetae with the Sakā tigraxaudā, however considers the Dahā as being a separate group from the Saka to which the Massagetae/Sakā tigraxaudā belonged.

== Location ==
The Dahae initially lived in the north-eastern part of the Persian Achaemenid Empire, in the arid steppes of the Karakum Desert near Margiana, alongside the Saka groups and the Sogdians and Chorasmians, and immediately to the north of Hyrcania.

During late 4th and early 3rd centuries BCE, the Dahae, and especially their constituent tribe of the Parni, had settled along the southern and southwestern fringes of the Karakum desert, and by the mid-3rd century BCE they had moved west and had settled along the southeastern shores of the Caspian Sea, in the lands to the north of Hyrcania. Two other Dahae tribes, the Xanthioi and the Pissouroi, lived further east till the regions to the north of Areia.

== Origins and name ==
No known permanent settlements have been attributed to the Dahae, suggesting that they were a nomadic people throughout their existence.

The name of the Dahae, attested in the Old Persian form Dahā, is apparently cognate with a Khotanese word daha "man". If the endonym of the Dahae was derived from such a word, it would follow a practice common to many languages, in which ethnonyms are derived from words meaning "human", "person" or "man". This appears to be cognate with nouns in other Eastern Iranian languages, such as a Persian word for "servant": dāh. A tribe called the Dāhī – mentioned in Avestan sources (e.g. Yašt 13.144) as adhering to Zoroastrianism are often identified with the Dahae.

Some scholars have also or instead connected the name Dahae to the Sanskrit word Dasa (Sanskrit दास Dāsa) – a people mentioned in ancient Hindu texts, such as the Rigveda – as enemies of the Ārya. Dasa appears to share the same root as the Sanskrit dasyu, meaning "hostile people" or "demons" – as well as the Avestan dax́iiu and Old Persian dahyu or dahạyu, meaning "province" or "mass of people".

Other scholars have suggested that there were etymological links between the names of the Dahae and Dacians (Dacii), a people in ancient Eastern Europe. Both were nomadic Indo-European peoples who shared variant names such as Daoi. David Gordon White, an Indologist and historian of religion, has reiterated a point made by previous scholars – that the names of both peoples resemble the Proto-Indo-European root: *dhau meaning "strangle" and/or a euphemism for "wolf". (Similarly, the Massagetae, the northern neighbors of the Dahae, have been linked to the Getae, a people related to the Dacians.)scholar David Gordon White has instead suggested that the name of the Dahae meant "stranglers," and was derived from the Proto-Indo-European root *dʰau, from which he also derived the name of the Dacians.

== History ==
A splinter Dahā might possibly have migrated at an early date across the Iranian plateau and joined the Persian people who lived in its southwestern part, with the Greek historian Herodotus later referring to the Daoi as one of the nomadic Persian tribes, along with the Mardians, Dropicans, and Sagartians, although this identification is uncertain.

The Dahā were in control of the traffic between Chorasmia in the north and Parthia and Hyrcania in the south.

According to the Babylonian historian Berossus, the founder of the Persian Achaemenid Empire, Cyrus, died fighting against the Dahae. According to the Iranologist Muhammad Dandamayev, Berossus identified the Dahae rather than the Massagetae as Cyrus's killers because they had replaced the Massagetae as the most famous nomadic tribe of Central Asia long before Berossus's time, although some scholars identified the Dahae as being identical with the Massagetae or as one of their sub-groups.

The oldest certain recorded mention of the Dahā is in the Daiva Inscription of the Achaemenid king Xerxes I along with the Sakā Haumavargā and the Sakā tigraxaudā.

The Dahā fought within the left wing of the Achaemenid army along with the Bactrians and the Saka against Alexander the Great at Gaugamela in 331 BCE.

The Dahae may have invaded Margiana and Areia around 300 BCE, and during this invasion they destroyed the towns of Alexandreia and Heracleia located in these respective two countries.

During late 4th and early 3rd centuries BCE, the Dahae, and especially their constituent tribe of the Parni, had settled along the southern and southwestern fringes of the Karakum desert, and by the mid-3rd century BCE they had moved west and had settled along the southeastern shores of the Caspian Sea, in the lands to the north of Hyrcania. Two other Dahae tribes, the Xanthioi and the Pissouroi, lived further east, in the regions to the north of Areia.

During the middle of the 3rd century, the Parni moved into Hyrcania, where they lived along the Ochus river. Their leader, Arsaces, would found the Parthian Empire.

During the 2nd century BCE, both the Dahae (大益 Dayi) who still lived in the steppes and the Parthian Empire (安息 Anxi), as well as the Chorasmians (驩潛 Huanqian), and Sogdians (蘇薤 Suxie) sent embassies to the Emperor Wu of the Han dynasty which was ruling China.

=== Legacy ===
The lands to the north of Hyrcania where the Dahae had settled in the 3rd century BCE became known as Dehestān (دَهستان) and Dahistān (داهستان) after them.

== See also ==
- Massagetae
- Parthian Empire
- Saka
- Scythian cultures

== Sources ==
- Abetekov, A. [in Kyrgyz]; Yusupov, H. (1994). "Ancient Iranian Nomads in Western Central Asia". In Dani, Ahmad Hasan; Harmatta, János; Puri, Baij Nath; Etemadi, G. F.; Bosworth, Clifford Edmund (eds.). History of Civilizations of Central Asia. Paris, France: UNESCO. pp. 24–34. ISBN 978-9-231-02846-5.
- Dandamayev, M. A. (1994). "Media and Achaemenid Iran". In Dani, Ahmad Hasan; Harmatta, János; Puri, Baij Nath; Etemadi, G. F.; Bosworth, Clifford Edmund (eds.). History of Civilizations of Central Asia. Vol. 2. Paris: UNESCO. pp. 35–64. ISBN 978-9-231-02846-5.
- de Blois, François; Vogelsang, Willem (1993). "Dahae". Encyclopædia Iranica. New York City, United States: Encyclopædia Iranica Foundation; Brill Publishers.
- Yu, Taishan (2004). A History of the Relationship Between the Western & Eastern Han, Wei, Jin, Northern & Southern Dynasties and the Western Regions (PDF). Sino-Platonic Papers. Vol. 131. Philadelphia, United States: University of Pennsylvania.
