= Peltasta zonula =

Scientific classification
- Domain: Eukaryota
- Kingdom: Animalia
- Phylum: Arthropoda
- Class: Insecta
- Order: Lepidoptera
- Family: Gelechiidae
- Genus: Peltasta
- Species: P. zonula

Binomial name
- Peltasta zonula (Gerasimov, 1930)

Synonyms
- Borkhausenia zonula Gerasimov, 1930; Brachmia zonula

Species of moth

Peltasta zonula is a moth of the family Gelechiidae. It was described by Aleksey Maksimovich Gerasimov in 1930. It is found in Uzbekistan and southern Kazakhstan.

Adults have been recorded from mid-April to mid-July at elevations of 600 to 900 meters.
