= Peltasta gershensonae =

Scientific classification
- Kingdom: Animalia
- Phylum: Arthropoda
- Clade: Pancrustacea
- Class: Insecta
- Order: Lepidoptera
- Family: Gelechiidae
- Genus: Peltasta
- Species: P. gershensonae

Binomial name
- Peltasta gershensonae (Emelyanov & Piskunov, 1982)

Synonyms
- Brachmia gershensonae Emelyanov & Piskunov, 1982

Species of moth

Peltasta gershensonae is a moth of the family Gelechiidae. It was described by Emelyanov and Piskunov in 1982. It is found in Mongolia.

Adults occur from mid-June to early August at elevations between 1,000 and 1,200 meters.
