= Peltasta =

Scientific classification
- Domain: Eukaryota
- Kingdom: Animalia
- Phylum: Arthropoda
- Class: Insecta
- Order: Lepidoptera
- Family: Gelechiidae
- Tribe: Gelechiini
- Genus: Peltasta; Bidzilya, 2010

Genus of moths

Peltasta is a genus of moths in the family Gelechiidae.

== Species ==
- Peltasta gershensonae (Emelyanov & Piskunov, 1982)
- Peltasta pseudozonula (Kuznetsov, 1960)
- Peltasta zonula (Gerasimov, 1930)
