= Hajjiabad, Hormozgan =

City in Hormozgan province, Iran

Hajjiabad Persian: حاجی‌آباد
- City
- Location within Iran
- Coordinates: 28°18′35″N 55°54′19″E
- Country: Iran
- Province: Hormozgan
- County: Hajjiabad
- District: Central

Population (2016)
  - Total: 28,977
- Time zone: UTC+3:30 (IRST)

Hajjiabad (Persian: حاجي اباد or حاجی‌آباد) (Note: Also romanized as Ḩājīābād and Hājjiābād; formerly the village of Saadatabad) is a city in the Central District of Hajjiabad County, Hormozgan province, Iran, serving as capital of both the county and the district. Hajjiabad is located about 100 km north of Bandar Abbas, capital of the province, and is best known for its citrus products.

== Demographics ==
=== Population ===
At the time of the 2006 National Census, the city's population was 20,264 in 4,719 households. The following census in 2011 counted 23,309 people in 5,781 households. The 2016 census measured the population of the city as 28,977 people in 8,093 households.
