= Jeitun =

Archaeological site of the Neolithic period in Turkmenistan

Coordinates: 38.18784839°N 58.34913633°E

- Jeýtun
- Djeitun; Jeytun
- Location in Turkmenistan Jeitun (West and Central Asia)
- Cultures: Jeitun culture
- Location: Kopet Dag

Jeitun (Djeitun) is an archaeological site of the Neolithic period in southern Turkmenistan, about 30 kilometers north of Ashgabat in the Kopet-Dag mountain range. The settlement was occupied from about 7200 to 4500 BC possibly with short interruptions. Jeitun has given its name to the whole Neolithic period in the foothills of the Kopet Dag.

== Excavations ==
Jeitun was discovered by Alexander Marushchenko and has been excavated since the 1950s by Boris Kuftin and Vadim Masson.

The site covers an area of about 5,000 square meters. It consists of free-standing houses of a uniform ground plan. The houses were rectangular and had a large fireplace on one side and a niche facing it as well as adjacent yard areas. The floors were covered with lime plaster. The buildings were made of sun-dried cylindrical clay blocks about 70 cm long and 20 cm thick. The clay was mixed with finely chopped straw.

There were about 30 houses that could have accommodated about 150–200 persons.

Clay figurines found in Mehrgarh (Pakistan), an important precursor to the Indus Valley Civilization, resemble those discovered at Teppe Zagheh, and at Jeitun.

== Agriculture ==
The people of the Jeitun culture were growing barley and two sorts of wheat, which were harvested with wooden or bone knives or sickles with stone blades. Stone handmills and other stone tools were found. The site seems to show the oldest evidence of arable farming in Central Asia.

Sheep and goats were already domesticated by the villagers, but they also hunted to supplement their diet. The results of the research by David R. Harris show that, in this region, there were none of the wild forms of einkorn or barley that could have been used for domestication, so these were brought from elsewhere already domesticated. The same applies to sheep. The wild goat Capra aegagrus, on the other hand, was widespread in Central Asia and could, therefore, have been domesticated in the area.

Various types of the earliest Jeitun artefacts, such as clay figurines, decorated ceramics, and small stone axes, show similarities with those of the early agricultural Neolithic sites in the Zagros Mountains, such as Jarmo (Iraq). This may indicate the movements of the Neolithic people from the Levant to Central Asia, via the Zagros Mountains.

It is possible that the later Jeitun influence expanded to the south, across the Kopet Dag mountains to Kermanshah Province and Luristan, to the sites such as Tepe Guran, Tepe Sarab, and Ganj Dareh.

== Jeitun culture ==
Jeitun culture may have begun prior to 7000 BC, judging by the age of Sang-i Chakmak, the earliest settlement where such artefacts are found. In the same area of the Gorgan Plain, other related sites are Yarim Tepe (Iran), and Tureng Tepe.

There are about twenty archaeological sites attributed to the Jeitun culture, and they are found on both sides of the Kopet Dag mountains. They are especially common in the south-west Turkestani foothills of the mountains. The sites extend west as far as Shahrud, Iran, and also east to the Tedjen river that flows north from Afghanistan.

Two other early Jeitun sites Chopan and Togolok are located nearby.

Monjukli Depe is another site where Jeitun culture artifacts have been discovered. It is quite important for establishing the regional chronology.

Jeitun period of Turkmenistan was followed by the Anau culture.

== See also ==
- Mergarh
- Ulug Depe

== Bibliography ==
- David R. Harris: Jeitun and the transition to agriculture in Central Asia. In: Archaeology International 1, 1997, S. 28–31, doi:10.5334/ai.0109
- V. Sarianidi: Food-producing and other Neolithic communities in Khorasan and Transoxania: eastern Iran, Soviet Central Asia and Afghanistan. In: A. H. Dani, V. M. Masson (Hrsg.): History of civilizations of Central Asia, Bd. 1. 1992, S. 109–126.
