= Ganj, Chaharmahal and Bakhtiari =

Ganj گنج
- Village
- Location within Iran
- Coordinates: 31°22′33″N 51°12′48″E
- Country: Iran
- Province: Chaharmahal and Bakhtiari
- County: Lordegan
- Bakhsh: Falard
- Rural District: Falard

Population (2006)
  - Total: 402
- Time zone: UTC+3:30 (IRST)
  - Summer (DST): UTC+4:30 (IRDT)

Ganj (Persian: گنج) is a village in Falard Rural District, Falard District, Lordegan County, Chaharmahal and Bakhtiari Province, Iran. At the 2006 census, its population was 402, in 77 families. The village is populated by Lurs.
