= Dehestan, Afghanistan =

Dehestan
- Location in Afghanistan
- Coordinates: 34°41′28″N 62°55′8″E
- Country: Afghanistan
- Province: Badghis Province
- Time zone: + 4.30

Dehestan is a village in Badghis Province in north western Afghanistan.
