= Boris Kuftin =

Boris Alekseevich Kuftin (Russian: Борис Алексеевич Куфтин; 2 February 1892 in Samara, Russia - 2 August 1953 in Lielupe (now a part of Jūrmala)) was a Soviet archaeologist and ethnographer. From 1933 to 1953, he worked in Tbilisi, Georgian SSR. In the 1930s, he discovered the Trialeti culture; and in 1940, he coined the term Kura-Araxes.

== Life and achievements ==
The son of a White Army colonel, Kuftin studied at Moscow University's Faculty of Physics and Mathematics until 1911, when he was expelled for participating in student unrest. He then spent two years in Italy and Switzerland. Following the general amnesty of 1913, he was able to resume his studies and graduated with a degree in botany. In 1922 he married the pianist Valentina Steshenko, through whom he became acquainted with many of the era's leading musicians.

In 1919, Dmitry Anuchin invited him to lecture on ethnography at Moscow University. In the 1920s, he combined teaching with fieldwork, investigating Crimean Tatar dwellings and conducting ethnographic research in the Meshchera Lowlands, North Ossetia, Amur Oblast, and other regions of the Soviet Union. In 1925, Kuftin and Boris Zhukov discovered the Lyalovo neolithic culture.

When a major debate over the aims and methods of Soviet ethnography erupted in 1929, Kuftin argued that archaeology, ethnography, and linguistics should not be treated separately, since together they addressed the fundamental question of ethnogenesis. During the campaign against ethnography in 1930, he was accused of counter-revolutionary activity, exiled to the Russian North for three years, and prohibited from living in Moscow thereafter.

From 1933 onward, he worked at the State Museum of Georgia as an archaeologist. Kuftin is remembered as one of the pioneers of Georgian (and Abkhazian) archaeology and among the first scholars to investigate the archaeological remains of Urartu. His groundbreaking reconstruction of Georgia's prehistory earned him the Stalin Prize in 1942. Kuftin became a member of the Georgian National Academy of Sciences in 1946. He was awarded the Order of the Badge of Honour in 1946.

In his last years, Kuftin took part in the South Turkmenistan Complex Archaeological Expedition. He died from blood loss after accidentally falling onto a sharpened stake that had been propping open the door of his house. Three weeks later, his widow took her own life. Both were interred at the Vera cemetery in Tbilisi.
