= Anau culture =

Archaeological site at Änew, Turkmenistan

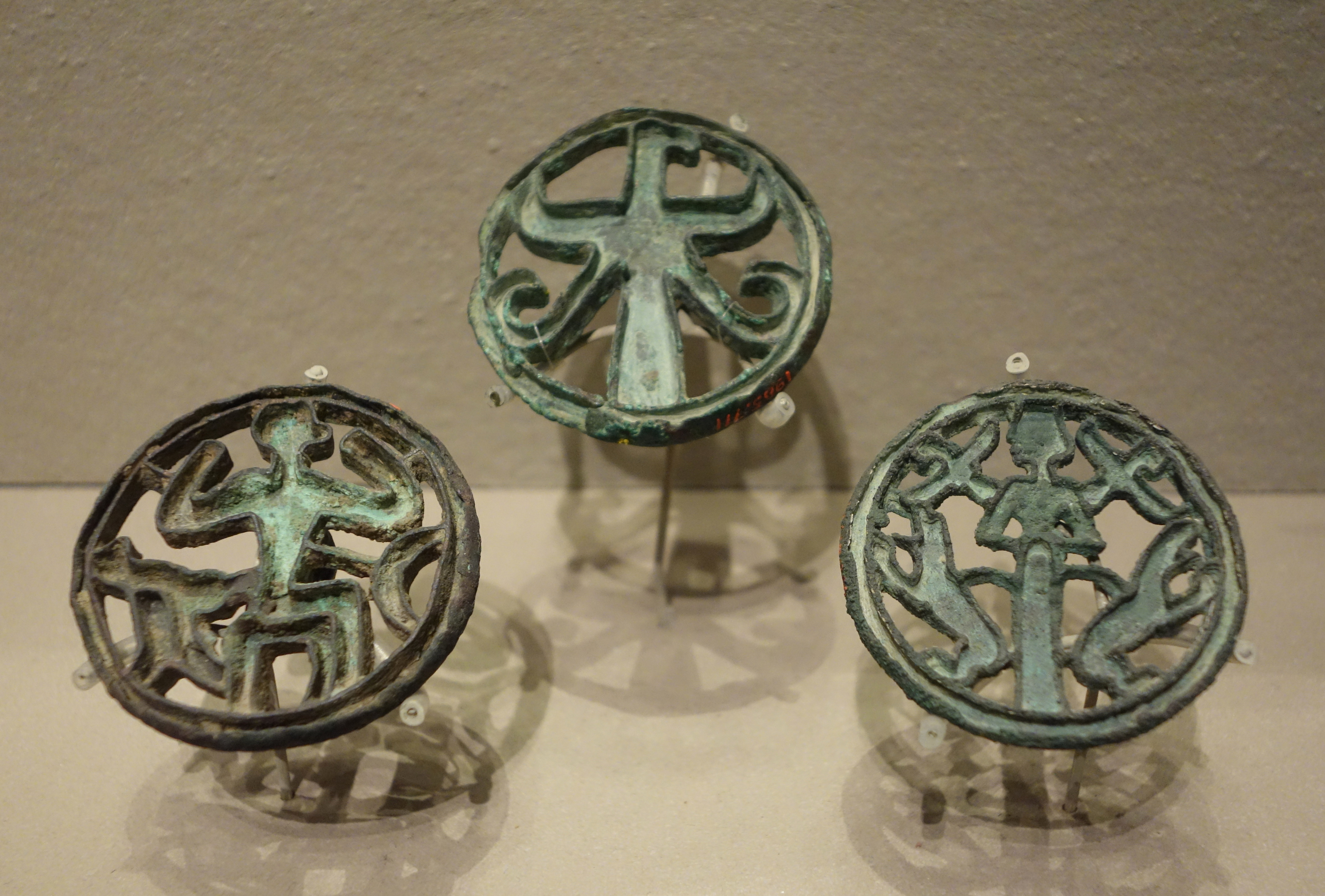
- Compartmented seals of eagle, monkey, and goddess. Provenance: Turkmenistan or northeast Iran; early Bronze Age, c. 2200-1800 BC, bronze - Museum of Fine Arts, Boston
- Geographical range: Southern Turkmenistan
- Period: Chalcolithic
- Dates: c. 4500 BC – 1100 BC
- Preceded by: Jeitun culture

The Anau culture was an ancient agricultural civilization of Central Asia centred in southern Turkmenistan. It started during the Chalcolithic period around 4000 BC, following the Neolithic Jeitun culture. It is named after its main site of Anau, Turkmenistan.

The Namazga culture was contemporary to the Anau culture.

Pottery similar to that of Anau (the earliest Anau IA phase) has been found as far as Shir Ashian Tepe in the Semnan Province of Iran.

== Site of Anau ==
The settlement of Anau started around 4500 BC in the Neolithic period, before copper was used. Thus, it is earlier than Namazga-Tepe, the main site of the Namazga culture.

Anau includes two mounds, north and south. Archaeological research here began in 1890. Raphael Pumpelly, Marushchenko, and Khurban Sokhatov were some of the researchers over the years.

The lowest layers of the north mound in Anau provide some good evidence for the transition from the Neolithic to the Chalcolithic in the area. This archaeological sequence is known as Anau IA.

More recent excavations at Monjukli Depe, which also has some Anau culture occupational levels, also helped to establish the regional chronology.

The northern mound also presents remains of the Chalcolithic and the Bronze Age. Some copper items, as well as imported Lapis lazuli have been found. The southern mound also has the Iron Age remains.

Although there are some similarities between the Anau IA and Jeitun ceramics, there are also many differences. Jeitun ceramics mostly use a plant-based temper, whereas those of Anau IA were tempered with a large amount of sand and bits of other ceramics.

Anau IA also has similarities to Tepe Sialk I and II layers. Ceramics similar to Anau IA are also found on the Iranian plateau, in northeastern Iran, and in southern Turkmenistan.

Remains of the domestic pig Sus vittatus have been found here in the first sedentary horizon seemingly having appeared suddenly which would indicate it having been imported. Sus vittatus was first domesticated in Southeast Asia.

== Early Chalcolithic ==
The Early Chalcolithic period Anau IB followed after Anau IA. This period also parallels the Namazga I period, the beginning of settlement at Namazga.

“Anau IB-Namazga I [period] has been recognized to be associated with an increase in population and advancements in every cultural-economic realm compared to the previous period in southern Turkmenistan. In this period, the settlements of the previous period expanded and reached an extent of 10-15 hectares; new settlements also appeared”.

== Stamp seal ==
An enigmatic stamp seal was found here, that may be the first evidence of an indigenous written language in Anau. The find is dated to c. 2300 BC.

Bronze Age seals from Altyndepe provide some parallels to the Anau seal. Two similar stamp seals have been found at Altyndepe with the same dimensions as the Anau seal.

These seals are also similar to the ones from Tepe Hissar and from Tepe Sialk in Iran, where such seals with geometric designs go back to the 5th millennium BC. Also, some Chinese parallels to the Anau seal are possible.

== See also ==
- Bactria–Margiana Archaeological Complex

== Bibliography ==
- Gian Luca Bonora, Massimo Vidale (2013), The Middle Chalcolithic in Southern Turkmenistan and the Archaeological Record of Ilgynly Depe. In: PETRIE C. A. (ed.),. Ancient Iran and its Neighbours: Local Developments and Long-range Interactions in the 4th Millennium BC. Oxbow Books. ISBN 9781782972273 doi:10.2307/j.ctvh1dn46.13
