= Tang-e Quchan, Kerman =

Tang-e Quchan تنگ قوچان
- Village
- Location within Iran
- Coordinates: 28°42′14″N 55°38′13″E
- Country: Iran
- Province: Kerman
- County: Sirjan
- Bakhsh: Central
- Rural District: Golestan

Population (2006)
  - Total: 27
- Time zone: UTC+3:30 (IRST)
  - Summer (DST): UTC+4:30 (IRDT)

Tang-e Quchan (Persian: تنگ قوچان, also Romanized as Tang-e Qūchān and Tang Qūchān; also known as Tang-e Sefīd) is a village in Golestan Rural District, in the Central District of Sirjan County, Kerman Province, Iran. At the 2006 census, its population was 27, in 5 families.
