= Dehestan, East Azerbaijan =

Dehestan دهستان
- Village
- Location within Iran
- Coordinates: 38°25′18″N 47°03′12″E
- Country: Iran
- Province: East Azerbaijan
- County: Ahar
- Bakhsh: Central
- Rural District: Bozkosh

Population (2006)
  - Total: 138
- Time zone: UTC+3:30 (IRST)
  - Summer (DST): UTC+4:30 (IRDT)

Dehestan (Persian: دهستان, also Romanized as Dehestān) is a village in Bozkosh Rural District, in the Central District of Ahar County, East Azerbaijan Province, Iran. At the 2006 census, its population was 138, in 32 families.
