= Taram, Chaharmahal and Bakhtiari =

Taram طارم
- Village
- Location within Iran
- Coordinates: 32°14′11″N 50°02′41″E
- Country: Iran
- Province: Chaharmahal and Bakhtiari
- County: Kuhrang
- Bakhsh: Bazoft
- Rural District: Bazoft

Population (2006)
  - Total: 124
- Time zone: UTC+3:30 (IRST)
  - Summer (DST): UTC+4:30 (IRDT)

Taram (Persian: طارم, also Romanized as Ţāram and Ţārom) is a village in Bazoft Rural District, Bazoft District, Kuhrang County, Chaharmahal and Bakhtiari Province, Iran. At the 2006 census, its population was 124, in 24 families. The village is populated by Lurs.
