= Dehistan/Mishrian =

Historical town on the trade route of Greater Iran

Coordinates: 38.2700°N 54.6250°E

The former city of Dehistan/Mashhad-i Misrian (Turkmen: Dehistan), now in the Balkan Region of western Turkmenistan, was a major economic center from the 10th to the 14th centuries CE. The city lay on an important trade route of the states comprising Greater Iran.

== Sites ==
=== Misrian ===
A double-walled city punctuated with guard-towers, Misrian was abandoned c. 15th century. Only a few monuments survive:

- Mosque of Khorezmshah Mohammed: Nothing stands except the two side columns of the main portal —18 m. in height, decorated with brickwork and turquoise glaze to render floral and geometric patterns— and a minaret at the corner of courtyard. The foundation of the mosque, comprising numerous fired-brick columns, have been excavated and restored. In the center of the courtyard, Niyazov had installed 3 evergreen trees within a fence in 1993.
- Abu-Jafar Ahmed Minaret: About 120 m. away from the courtyard minaret, this was designed by one Abu Bini Ziyad c. early 11th century. It features two rings of Arab inscriptions, and a higher ring of geometric motifs. A spiral staircase can be used to access the top.
- Caravansarays: Excavations have discovered bases of multiple caravansarays.

=== Mashat ===
A medieval graveyard, the site houses five mausoleums along a single line; in nineteenth century, there were apparently about twenty. All are either circular or octagonal, and lack in domes. Adjacent to this line, is located the Shir-kabir Mosque-Mausoleum atop a mound. Dated to 9th/10th century, this is the oldest extant mosque in Turkmenistan

== World Heritage Status ==
This site was added to the UNESCO World Heritage Tentative List on February 25, 1998, in the Cultural category.
