= Kopet Dag =

Mountain range on the Iranian–Turkmen border

- کپه‌داغ
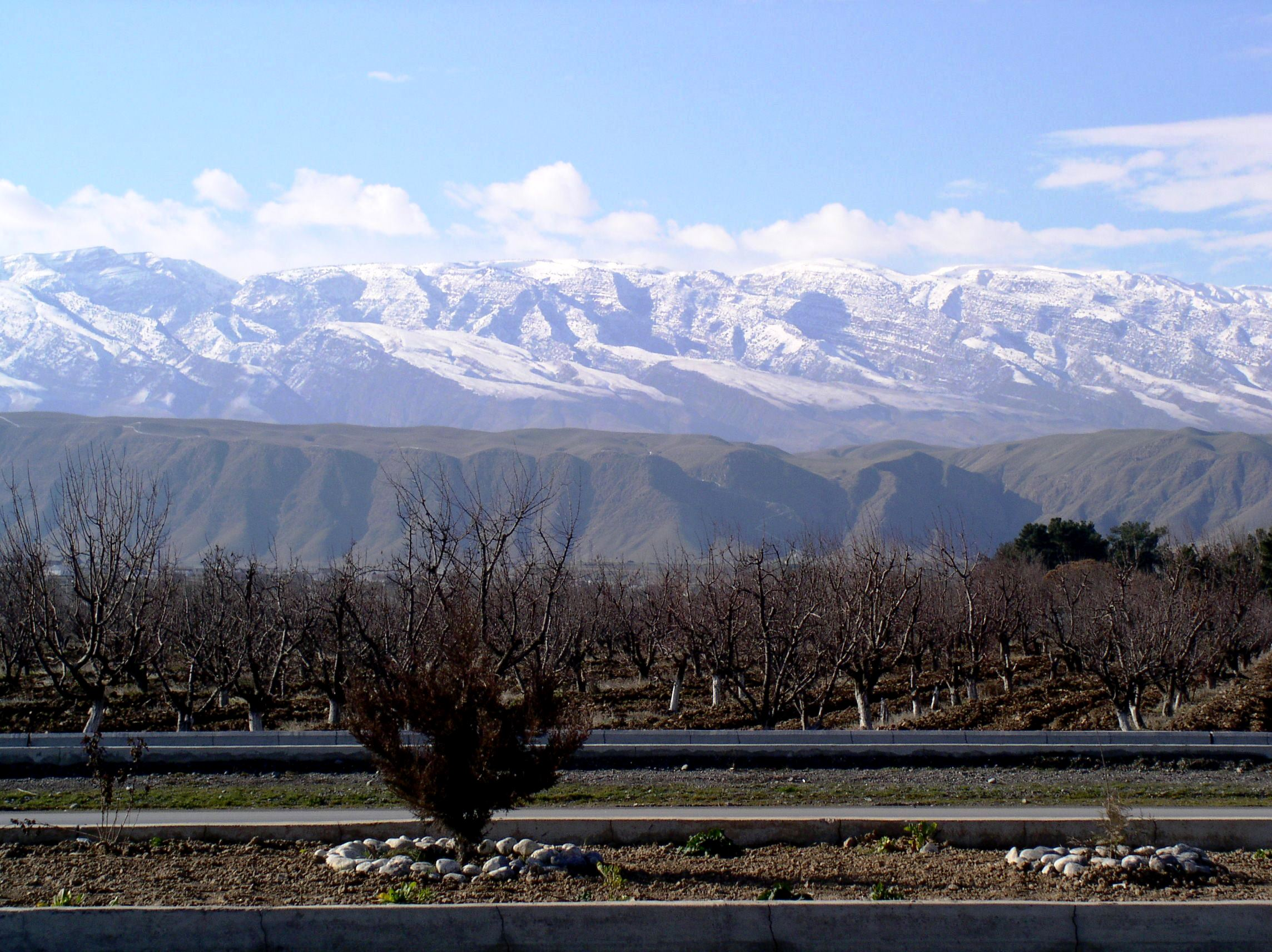
- View of the Kopet Dag in early spring from Bereket, Turkmenistan

Highest point
- Peak: Kuh-e Quchan
- Elevation: 3,191 m (10,469 ft)

Dimensions
- Length: 650 km (400 mi)

Naming
- Native name: Köpetdag; کپه‌داغ

Geography
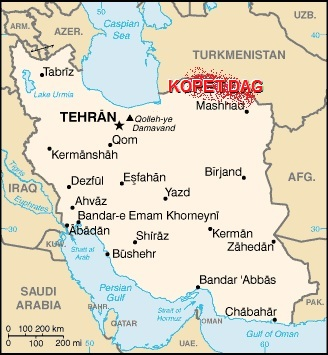
- Map of Iran showing the location of Kopet Dag.
- Countries: Turkmenistan; Iran
- Range coordinates: 38°4′N 57°22.4′E

Map of Iran with Kopet Dag in northeast

The Köpet Dag (Turkmen: Köpetdag [ˌkœpɛtˈdɑːʁ]; Persian: کپه‌داغ), also known as the Turkmen–Khorasan Mountain Range, is a mountain range on the border between Turkmenistan and Iran that extends about 650 kilometres (400 mi) along the border southeast of the Caspian Sea, stretching northwest-southeast from near the Caspian Sea in the northwest to the Hari River in the southeast. In the southwest it borders on the parallel eastern endings of the Alborz mountains being together part of the much larger Alpide belt. The highest peak of the range in Turkmenistan is the Mount Rizeh (Kuh-e Rizeh), located at the southwest of the capital Ashgabat and stands at 2,940 metres (9,646 ft). The highest Iranian summit is Mount Quchan (Kuh-e Quchan) at 3,191 metres (10,469 ft).

== Etymology ==
Vambery conjectured that köpet originates from the Turkmen language where "köp" means "a lot" or "many" and the word "dag" means "mountain" or "peak". He thus translated Köpetdag as "Many mountains (peaks)". He and others noted that in Persian koppeh means "pile" or "heap", and the word dag or dagh means "mountain" in Turkic. Thus, a second conjecture held that the Persian version of Kopet Dagh or Koppeh Dagh could be defined as "the mountain that is piled or heaped" and therefore the words could mean "piled or hilly mountains" or "low hills" in general. Ataniyazov, however, rejects those hypotheses:

The word kopet is probably derived from the Persian word kuhibet (kuh - "dag", bet - "bad") and means "bad mountain". No name was given to the entirety of this range, but a name was given to each part of it...According to Murzayev, the section of this mountain range west of Ashgabat was called Kopetdag (Murzayev. SA, p. 248). The most common name for this part of the range was Taňrygargan ("Cursed by God")...the Persians called it Kupet...(in Persian this name is wah, i.e., it is spelled with a long drawn-out Ku: pet and Ku: bet). For the most part, it was very dangerous to cross, because of the wind and the cold. That is why the Persians call the mountain range "bad mountain" and the Turkmens call it "Cursed by God". In the second half of the last century, Russian scholars who studied in the Kopetdag passed the name onto maps as the name of the entire range and spread it to the public. Many of the elders living in the foothills of the Kopetdag do not know the name Kopetdag...Vambery conjectures that the word kopet is derived from the words kubbet, kuppe (perhaps a lot — S.A.)...Pomerantsev also interprets the name as "multi-mountain" (mountain range), while the locals consider it part of the mythical Cape Mountain in Kopet, but these interpretations are incorrect.

== Geology ==
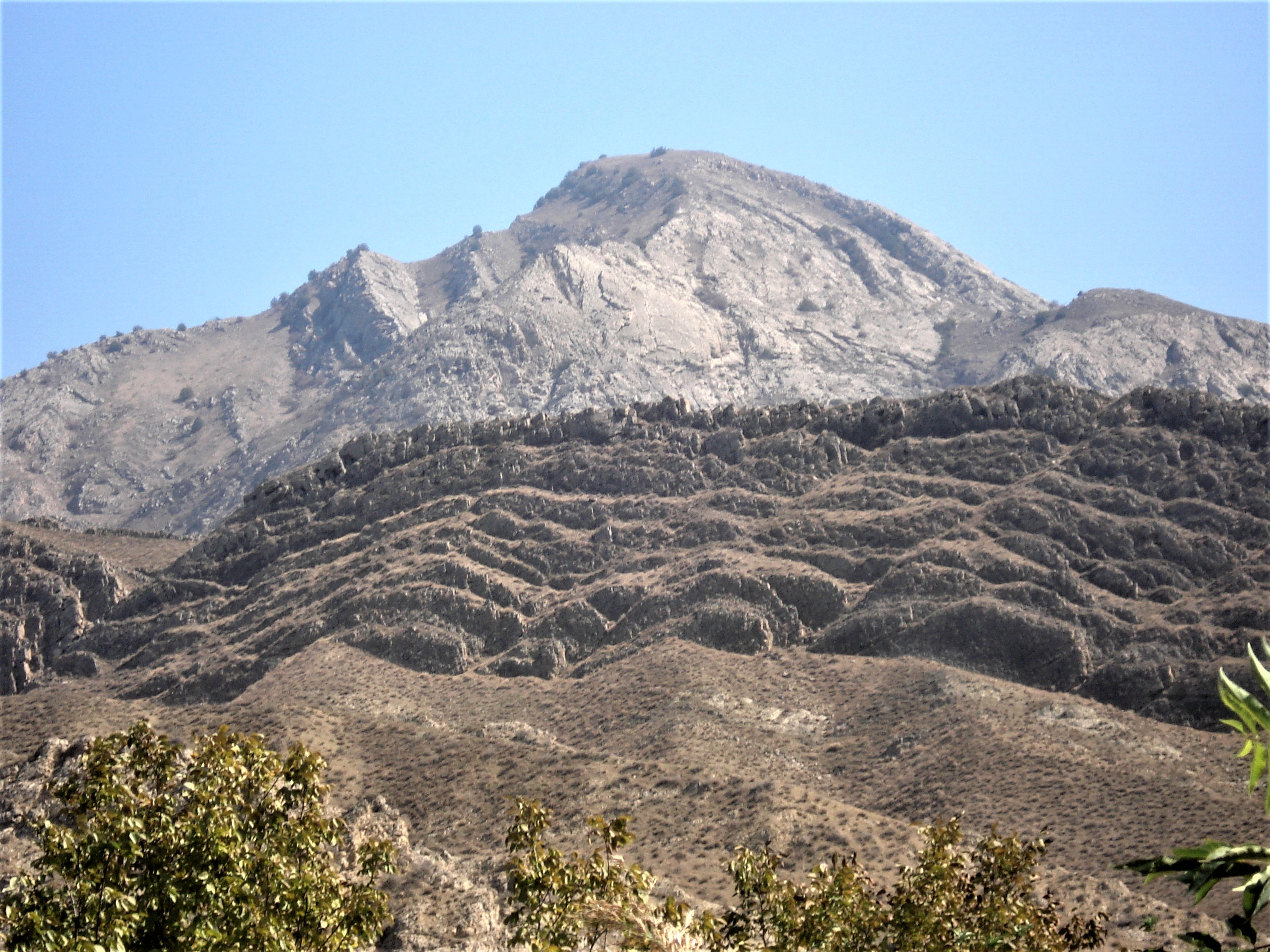
Kopetdag Mountain Range, Chuli, Turkmenistan

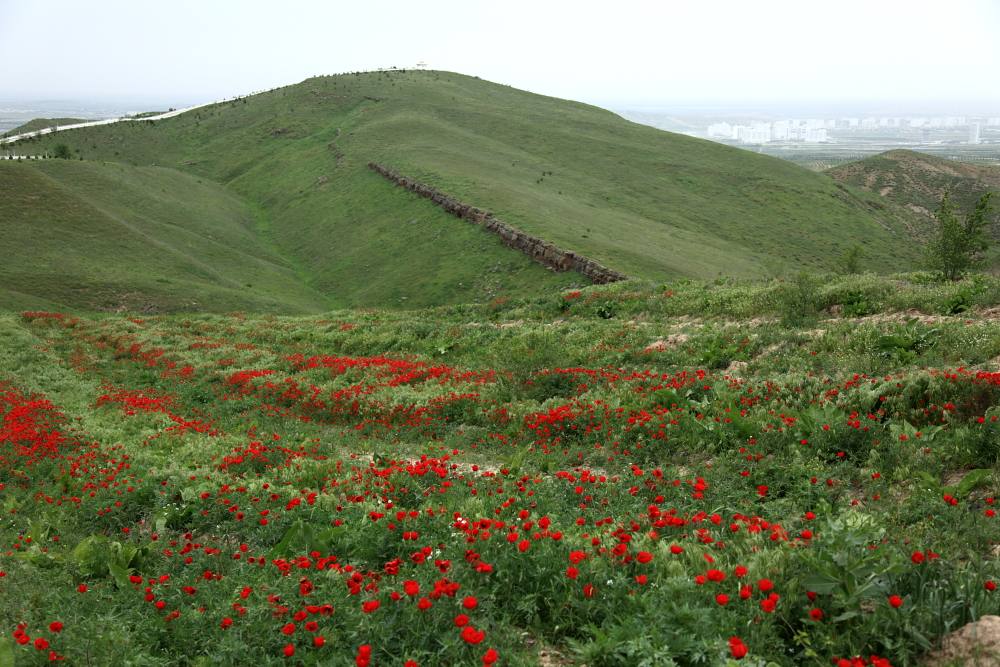
Kopetdag spring

Geologically, the Kopet Dag Range is made chiefly of Lower Cretaceous sedimentary rocks with a smaller portion of Jurassic rocks in the southeastern parts. The mountains were formed in the Miocene and the Pliocene during the Alpine orogeny. As the Tethys Sea was closed and the Arabian plate collided with the Iranian plate and was pushed against it and with the clockwise movement of the Eurasian plate towards the Iranian plate and their final collision, the Iranian plate was pressed against the Turan Platform. This collision folded the entire rocks that had been deposited in this geosyncline or basin from the Jurassic to the Miocene and formed the Kopet Dag Mountains.

== Topography ==
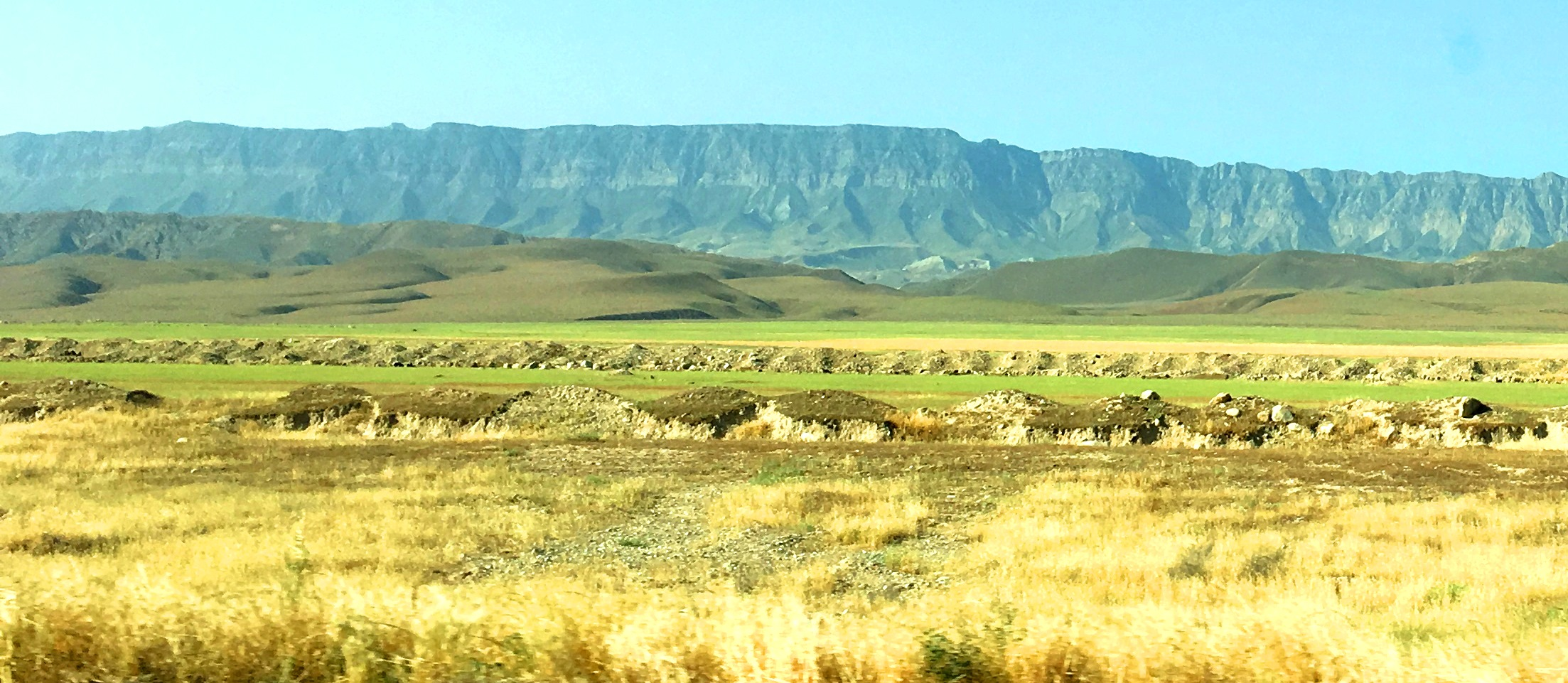
View on Kopetdag Range, Akhal, Turkmenistan

The Kopet Dag Range is a region characterized by foothills, dry and sandy slopes, mountain plateaus, and steep ravines. The Kopet Dag is undergoing tectonic transformation, and is subject to severe earthquakes. Earthquakes exceeding seven on the Richter scale have been recorded.

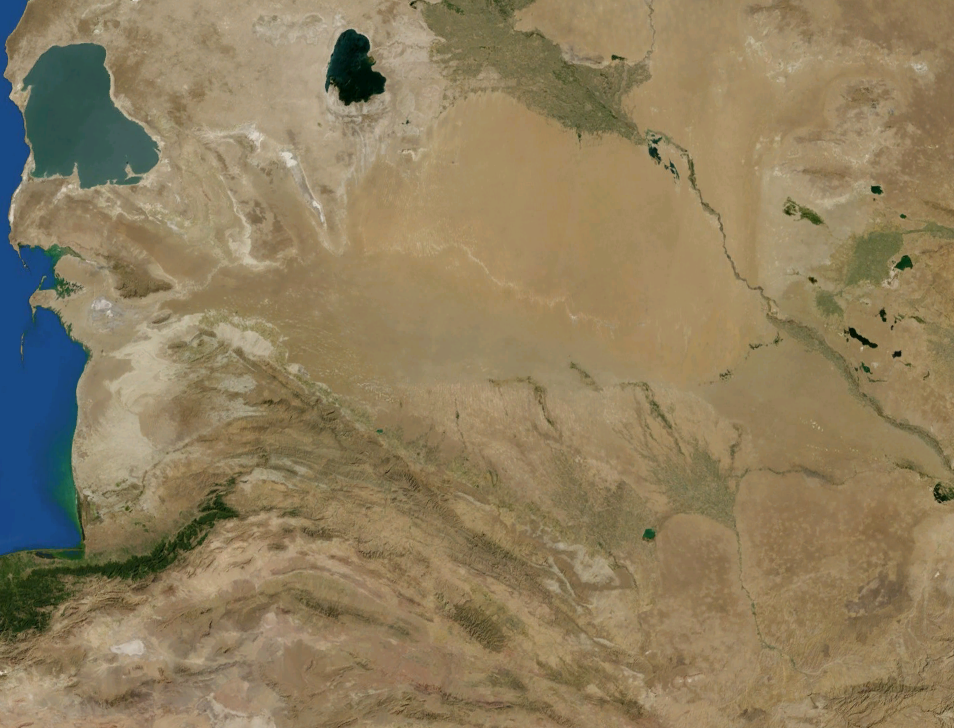
Kopet Dagh from space

The most western foothills of the Kopetdag mountains are known as the 'Kürendag Ridge'.

== Archaeology ==
There is archaeological evidence of settlement in the well-watered northern foothills of the Kopet Dag during the Neolithic period. This region is dotted with the multi-period hallmarks characteristic of the ancient Near East, similar to those southwest of the Kopet Dag in the Gorgan Plain in Iran. At Jeitun (or Djeitun), mud brick houses were first occupied c. 6000 BC (see BMAC origins). Also the foothills of the Kopet-Dag near Ashgabat are the site of the remains of the ancient Parthian city of Nisa (Nessa, Nusaý).

== Ski resort ==
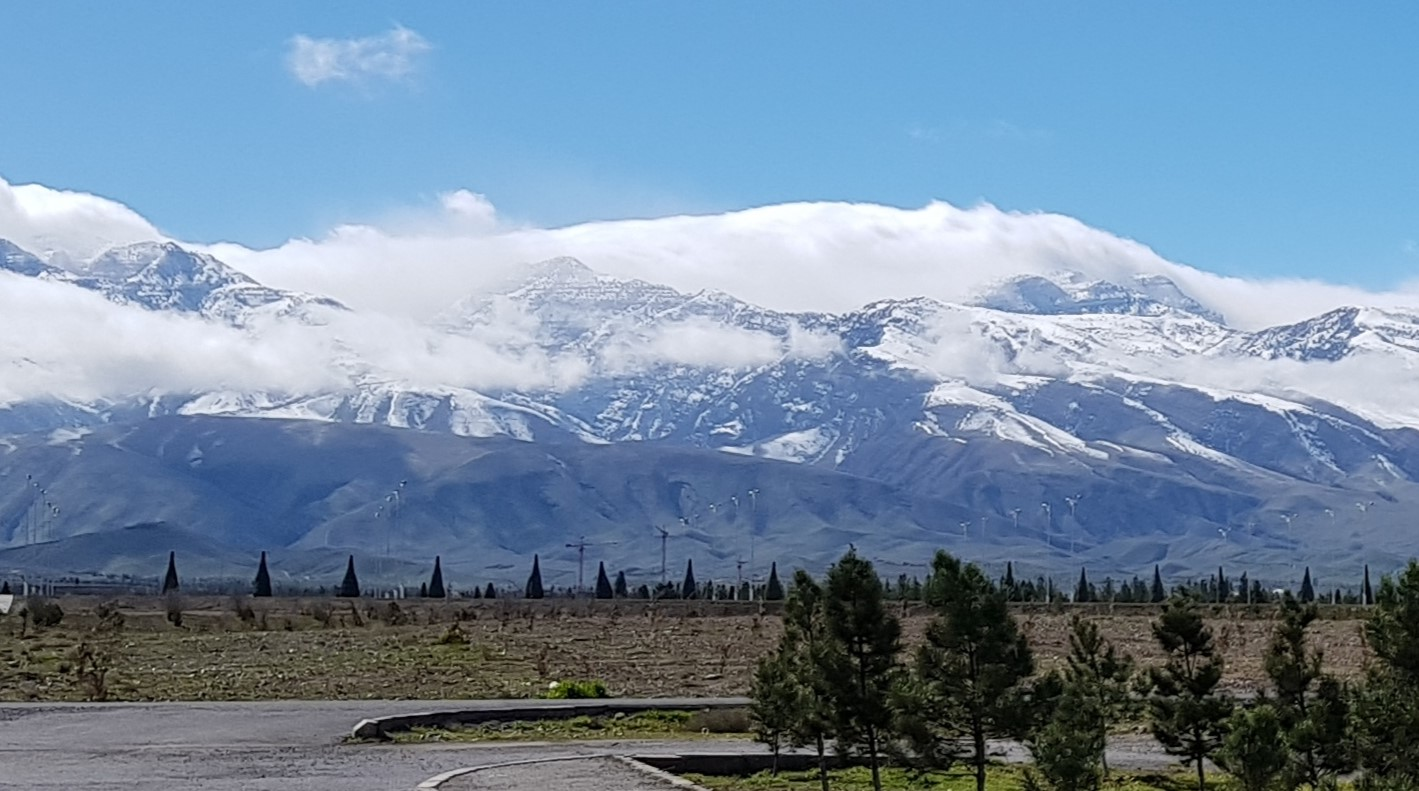
Kopetdag Mountain in Snow, View from Ashgabat

This mountain range has a ski resort, officially opened by the former president of Turkmenistan, Saparmurat Niyazov. Despite the very small amount of snow in the Kopet Dag mountains (due to the arid – albeit cold – climate), Niyazov was determined to build a major resort there.

== Plants and animals ==
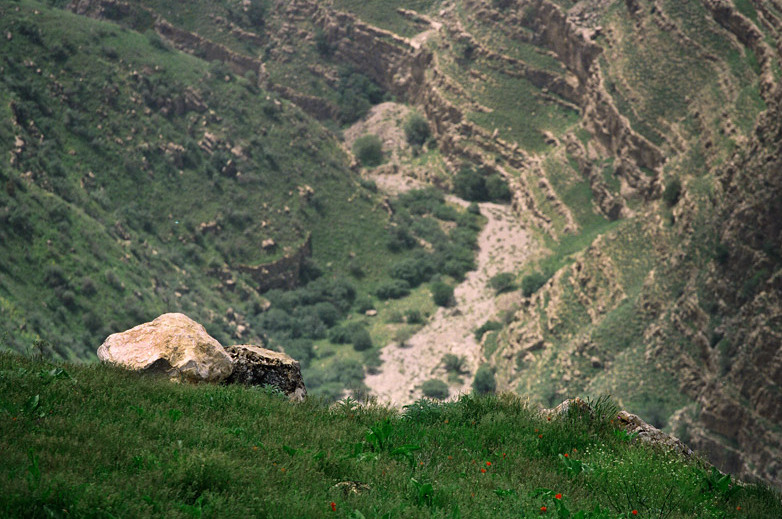
Kopet Dag Mountains in May.

The woodlands of the region are home to many fruit trees, shrubs, and vines that have proved valuable for human use and selective breeding, including pomegranate (Punica granatum), wild grapes Vitis sylvestris, fig (Ficus carica), wild apple (Malus turkmenorum), wild pear (Pyrus boissieriana), wild cherries (Prunus spp., also called Cerasus microcarpa, C. erythrocarpa, C. blinovskii), wild prune (Prunus divaricata), almonds (Amygdalus communis=Prunus dulcis, and A. scoparia=Prunus scoparia), and hawthorns (Crataegus spp.).

== See also ==
- 1929 Koppeh Dagh earthquake
