= Viktor Sarianidi =

Soviet and Russian archaeologist (1929–2013)

- Born: September 23, 1929; Tashkent, Uzbek SSR, Soviet Union
- Died: December 22, 2013 (aged 84); Moscow, Russia
- Scientific career
- Fields: Archaeology

Viktor Ivanovich Sarianidi or Victor Sarigiannides (Russian: Ви́ктор Ива́нович Сариани́ди; Greek: Βίκτωρ Σαρηγιαννίδης; September 23, 1929 – December 22, 2013) was a Soviet archaeologist. He discovered the remains of a Bronze Age culture in the Karakum Desert in 1976. The culture came to be known as the Bactria-Margiana Archaeological Complex.

== Biography ==
Viktor Sarianidi was born on September 23, 1929, in Tashkent in a family of Pontic Greek descent. His parents, Ioannis and Athena Sarianidi had immigrated there from Yalta in the 1920s.

Sarianidi graduated from the Central Asian State University in 1952. He then obtained a master's degree in 1961 from the Institute of Archaeology of the Soviet Academy of Sciences in Moscow. His doctoral dissertation, titled Afghanistan in the Bronze and Iron Ages, came out in 1975.

Sarianidi joined the staff of the Institute of Archaeological, where he remained throughout his career.

In 1996, he moved to Greece.

Sarianidi died in the night of December 22, 2013 in Moscow.

== Career ==
While still a student, in 1949, Sarianidi began to work at archaeological sites in Turkmenistan under the supervision of Mikhail Masson. Following his graduation from the Central Asian State University in 1952, he joined the Historical Museum in Samarkand, where he worked for two years.

Sarianidi participated in excavations of monuments of Tahirbey, Yaz Depe (1955-1956), Togolok (1970s). From 1974, he supervised excavations that led to the uncovering of the culture of Margiana (or Margush), and the discovery in 1990 of over 200 settlements dating to the Bronze Age and early Iron Age. Chief amongst these was the capital city Gonur Tepe, which was founded at the end of the third millennium BCE, lasting till around 1600 BCE. The city had a central palace protected by fortified walls with rectangular towers. Outside these walls, on the eastern side, was discovered the earliest known Fire temple, "predating Zoroaster [1000 BC] by at least fifteen hundred years but linked with what would become the rituals of his faith". Sacrificial temples had been set up along the southern and western faces of the walls. The temples were surrounded by a second series of reinforced monumental walls. In the south, two pools (one measuring 100 by 60 metres) were discovered, based on which it was speculated that the population of Gonur worshipped water. The discoveries of Margush and Gonurdepe caused Sarianidi to argue "that they proved[d] that the Amu Darya (Oxus River) valley in Central Asia constitutes a fourth point of origin of urban civilization, along with the Nile, Indus, and Tigris-Euphrates valleys."

In 1978, Sarianidi discovered six undisturbed tombs at Tillya Tepe, dating to the 1st century BC. The deceased were richly equipped with gold, the so-called Bactrian Gold.

In 1996, a great necropolis was discovered 350 metres to the west of Gonur. Excavations there continued over the next ten years, and uncovered nearly 3000 graves.

== Public image ==
Sarianidi, though not liked by everyone due to his bluff personality, is widely considered to be a legend in archeology circles. He sported a luxuriant walrus moustache and, in later years, a shock of white hair. Sarianidi was at home and at his best in the vast expanses of inhospitable Central Asian desert where he could be found barefoot and gesticulating with his cane. He lived an uncomfortable life which, besides excavating, was spent trying to stay alive and secure a supply of vodka.

== Awards and recognition ==
- Gold cross of Order of Honour of Greece.
- Honorary citizenship of Turkmenistan, 2000.
- Makhtumkuli International Prize, Turkmenistan, 2001.
- Jamal ad-Din al-Afghani prize, the highest cultural honour of Afghanistan.

== See also ==
- South Turkmenistan Complex Archaeological Expedition
