= Tarom Rural District =

Rural district in Hormozgan province, Iran

Tarom Rural District Persian: دهستان طارم
- Rural District
- Location within Iran
- Coordinates: 28°07′19″N 55°44′22″E
- Country: Iran
- Province: Hormozgan
- County: Hajjiabad
- District: Central
- Capital: Tashkuiyeh

Population (2016)
  - Total: 10,145
- Time zone: UTC+3:30 (IRST)

Tarom Rural District (Persian: دهستان طارم) is in the Central District of Hajjiabad County, Hormozgan province, Iran. Its capital is the village of Tashkuiyeh.

== Demographics ==
=== Population ===
At the time of the 2006 National Census, the rural district's population was 10,834 in 2,634 households. There were 10,372 inhabitants in 2,920 households at the following census of 2011. The 2016 census measured the population of the rural district as 10,145 in 3,118 households. The most populous of its 38 villages was Sarchahan, with 2,250 people.
