= Daragah Rural District =

Rural district in Hormozgan province, Iran

Daragah Rural District Persian: دهستان درآگاه
- Rural District
- Location within Iran
- Coordinates: 28°32′29″N 55°39′44″E
- Country: Iran
- Province: Hormozgan
- County: Hajjiabad
- District: Central
- Capital: Dehestan-e Bala

Population (2016)
  - Total: 6,382
- Time zone: UTC+3:30 (IRST)

Daragah Rural District (Persian: دهستان درآگاه) is in the Central District of Hajjiabad County, Hormozgan province, Iran. Its capital is the village of Dehestan-e Bala.

== Demographics ==
=== Population ===
At the time of the 2006 National Census, the rural district's population was 7,512 in 1,862 households. There were 6,274 inhabitants in 1,788 households at the following census of 2011. The 2016 census measured the population of the rural district as 6,382 in 1,930 households. The most populous of its 80 villages was Baghat, with 1,347 people.
