= Central District (Hajjiabad County) =

District in Hormozgan province, Iran

Central District (Hajjiabad County) Persian: بخش مرکزی شهرستان حاجی‌آباد
- District
- Location within Iran
- Coordinates: 28°19′51″N 55°40′22″E
- Country: Iran
- Province: Hormozgan
- County: Hajjiabad
- Capital: Hajjiabad

Population (2016)
  - Total: 45,504
- Time zone: UTC+3:30 (IRST)

The Central District of Hajjiabad County (Persian: بخش مرکزی شهرستان حاجی‌آباد) is in Hormozgan province, Iran. Its capital is the city of Hajjiabad. (Note: Formerly the village of Saadatabad)

== Demographics ==
=== Population ===
At the time of the 2006 National Census, the district's population was 38,610 in 9,215 households. The following census in 2011 counted 39,955 people in 10,489 households. The 2016 census measured the population of the district as 45,504 inhabitants in 13,141 households.

=== Administrative divisions ===
Central District (Hajjiabad County) Population
Administrative Divisions	2006	2011	2016
Daragah RD	7,512	6,274	6,382
Tarom RD	10,834	10,372	10,145
Hajjiabad (city)	20,264	23,309	28,977
Total	38,610	39,955	45,504
RD = Rural District
