= Hajjiabad County =

County in Hormozgan province, Iran

Hajjiabad County Persian: شهرستان حاجی‌آباد
- County
- Location of Hajjiabad County in Hormozgan province (top, green)

- Location of Hormozgan province in Iran
- Coordinates: 28°12′00″N 56°08′14″E
- Country: Iran
- Province: Hormozgan
- Capital: Hajjiabad
- Districts: Central, Ahmadi, Fareghan

Area
  - Total: 9,466 km^{2} (3,655 sq mi)

Population (2016)
  - Total: 69,625
  - Density: 7.355/km^{2} (19.05/sq mi)
- Time zone: UTC+3:30 (IRST)

Hajjiabad County (Persian: شهرستان حاجی‌آباد) is in Hormozgan province, Iran. Its capital is the city of Hajjiabad, (Note: Formerly the village of Saadatabad) about 100 km north of Bandar Abbas (the capital of the province), and best known for its citrus produce.

== History ==
After the 2006 National Census, the village of Sar-e Gaz-e Ahmadi was elevated to the status of a city.

== Demographics ==
=== Population ===
At the time of the 2006 census, the county's population was 62,442 in 15,056 households. The following census in 2011 counted 65,889 people in 17,580 households. The 2016 census measured the population of the county as 69,625 in 20,700 households.

=== Administrative divisions ===
Hajjiabad County's population history and administrative structure over three consecutive censuses are shown in the following table.

Hajjiabad County Population
Administrative Divisions	2006	2011	2016
Central District	38,610	39,955	45,504
Daragah RD	7,512	6,274	6,382
Tarom RD	10,834	10,372	10,145
Hajjiabad (city)	20,264	23,309	28,977
Ahmadi District	10,808	9,920	10,321
Ahmadi RD	5,261	3,392	3,082
Kuh-e Shah RD	5,547	5,358	6,082
Sar-e Gaz-e Ahmadi (city)		1,170	1,157
Fareghan District	13,024	13,071	12,386
Ashkara RD	8,003	8,417	8,121
Fareghan RD	3,159	2,729	2,492
Fareghan (city)	1,862	1,925	1,773
Total	62,442	65,889	69,625
RD = Rural District

== See also ==
Media related to Hajjiabad County at Wikimedia Commons
