= Tureng Tepe =

Archaeological site in Iran

- Location in Iran
- 36°56′17.95″N 54°35′11.47″E
- Periods: Chalcolithic and Bronze Age

Site notes
- Excavation dates: 1931, 1963–1979
- Archaeologists: Frederick Wulsin, Jean Deshayes

Iran National Heritage List
- Official name: Turang Tappeh
- Type: Mound
- Designated: 1932
- Reference no.: 66
- Conservation organization: Cultural Heritage, Handicrafts and Tourism Organization of Iran

Tureng Tepe (Persian: تورنگ تپه, lit. 'Hill of the Pheasants'; alternatively spelled in English as Turang Tappe/Tape/Tappa/Tappeh) is a Neolithic and Chalcolithic archaeological site in northeastern Iran, in the Gorgan plain, approximately 17 kilometers northeast of the town of Gorgan. Nearby is a village of Turang Tappeh. The site was a major fort on the Sasanian era "Alexander’s wall" (see: Great Wall of Gorgan).

== Archaeology ==
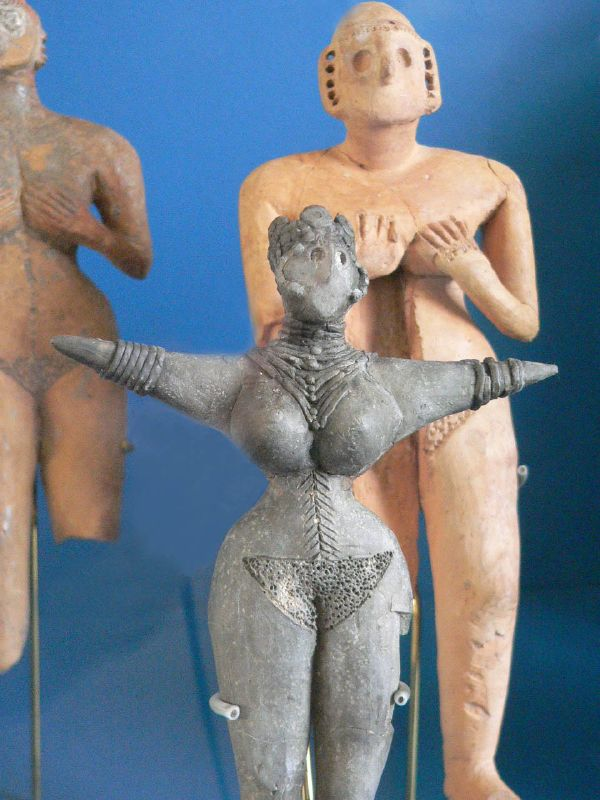
Female Figurine Iran Tureng Tepe IIIB Period 3rd Millennium BCE (64322880)

Tureng Tepe consists of a group of mounds, covering an area of about 35 hectares, interspersed with ponds and water courses. The whole archaeological pattern is about 900 meters in diameter. Most of the mounds rise between eleven and fifteen meters above the level of the surrounding plan, but the steep central mound, marked A on the Wulsin's plan, is over 30 meters high and dominates the entire site. A small modern village lies at the foot of the large mound. The significant mounds are:

- Main Mound (Mound A) - A 35 meter high flattened cone 110 meters in diameter at the base and 40 meters at the top and heavily eroded by wind on the western slope, with a large modern village lying at its southeastern foot. Ruins of a 19th-century residence at the peak.
- North Mound (Mound B) - Covered with a modern cemetery
- Tepe South
- Small Mound (Mound C or Naghar Tepe) - West of the main mound. Now part of an artificial dam

In 1841, some material (including gold vessels), known as the "Asterabad treasure", from the site was sent to the Shah (Mohammad Shah Qajar), and examined by Clement Augustus (C.A.) de Bode, piquing initial modern interest in the site. The first modern excavations were done by Frederick Wulsin in June and October 1931, sponsored by the Atkins Museum of Fine Arts. Grey burnished ware pottery, red ware, red ware with black painted decoration, coarse ware, and one example of cream colored ware with black painted decoration were found and studied. Excavation occurred on the central mound (Mound A) with a 17 meter deep pit at the top to explore a large brick structure eroding out of the western face of the mound. The building was found to have two settlement layers and sit on an extensive mudbrick platform. Tunnels were also excavated in the northern and eastern sides of Mound A. Excavation squares were dug on Mound C and Mound A. One grave was found on Mound A and the surface of Mound C contained 75 Bronze Age graves associated with architectural remains. A number of finds ended up at the Penn Museum.

Excavations resumed at the site in 1960 led by Jean Deshayes of the University of Paris with a two-month season excavating two test pits on the northern part of Mound C to establish the stratigraphy. In 1962, three pits were excavated on Tepe South. Work on the main mound began in 1967 and continued until 1977 excavating a total of 3150 square meters. Publication of the excavation began but was interrupted by the Iran Revolution and death of the principles but is now in process.

== History ==
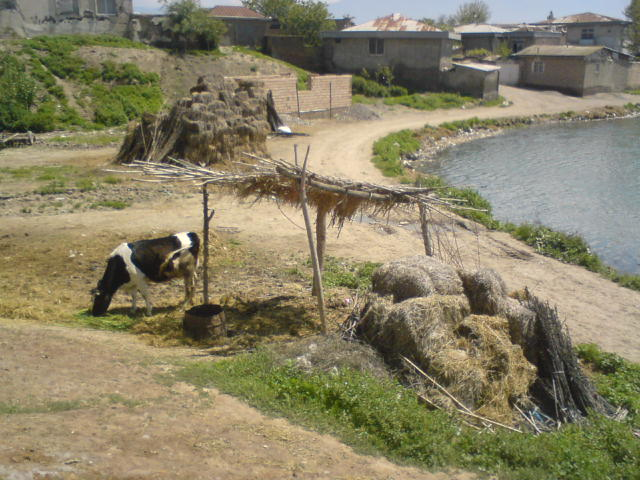
View of the village of Tureng Tepe from its archaeological hill.

The oldest remains on the site date to the Neolithic and Chalcolithic periods. The Bronze Age settlement portion of the site dates from approximately 3100–2900 BC through 1900 BC. The Strata up through IIIC are synchronized with those from Tepe Hissar.

=== Neolithic Age ===
- Tureng IA (Neolithic period - these layers are assumed to lie below the water table. From this horizon occur Djeitun-like sherds, incorporated in bricks made in later periods)
- Tureng IB (Late Neolithic period - again presumably below the water table)

=== Chalcolithic Age ===
- Tureng IIA (c. 4000–3100 BCE)

=== Early Bronze Age ===
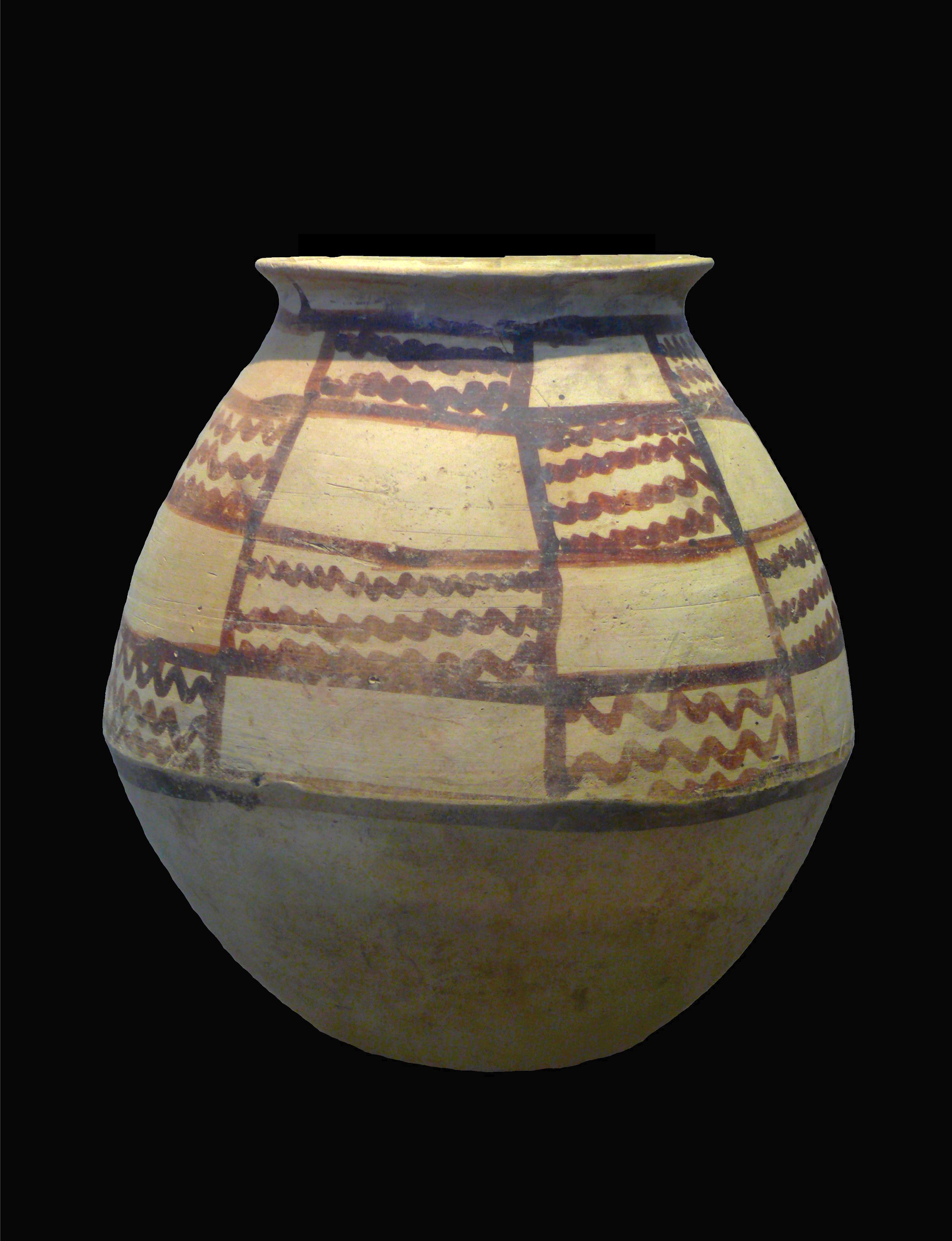
Painted pottery, Iranian Bronze Age of Tureng tepe. 2nd millennium BC at the Louvre Museum, Paris

- Tureng IIB (ca. 3100–2600 BC)
- Tureng III A / B (ca. 2600–2100 BC). To this period belongs an enormous, mud-bricks high terrace, constructed in the center of the settlement and representing perhaps the earliest example of monumental architecture in this region. This structure was radiocarbon dated to 3880+/–110 CYBP i.e. 2550 BC–2185 BC.
- Tureng III C (about 2100 –? BC)

=== Iron Age ===
- Tureng IV A (Iron Age, possibly 7th century BC)
- Tureng IV B (Iron Age, possibly 6th century BC)
- Tureng VA (2nd century BC)

=== Historical time ===
- Tureng VB (1st century BC)
- Tureng VC / D (1st–2nd century AD)
- Tureng VI A Sasanian Empire(3rd–5th century AD)
- Tureng VI B end of the Sasanian Empire (possibly 6th–7th centuries)
- Tureng VII A / B Islamic occupation at the top of Mound A(10th–11th century AD)
- Tureng VIII some Islamic remains located in the south-west part of the site (possibly 13th century AD)

== Figurines ==
The figurines of Tureng Tepe have long been recognized as quite remarkable. They include both terracotta and stone figurines.

As far as the stone figurines, there are many similarities between Tureng and the nearby sites of Shah Tepe, Tepe Hissār, and Gohar Tappeh. Yet the terracotta figurines of Tureng Tepe are unparalleled at any other nearby site. These baked clay figurines find their parallels with sites further away, in Turkmenistan and the Indus valley. Some parallels as far as Mesopotamia have been suggested.

== See also ==
- Yarim Tepe (Iran)
- List of cities of the ancient Near East
