= Dieulafoy =

Dieulafoy is a surname of French origin. Notable people with the surname include:

- Jane Dieulafoy (1851–1916), French archeologist, explorer, novelist and journalist
- Marcel-Auguste Dieulafoy (1844-1920), French archaeologist
- Michel Dieulafoy (1762–1823), French playwright
- Paul Georges Dieulafoy (1839–1911), French physician and surgeon

== Other ==
- Dieulafoy's lesion, a rare cause of gastric bleeding, first described by Paul Georges Dieulafoy
