= Iraj Castle =

Brick fortress near Ja'far Abad in northern Iran

- قلعه ایرج (Persian)
- Qaleh Iraj, Iraj Citadel
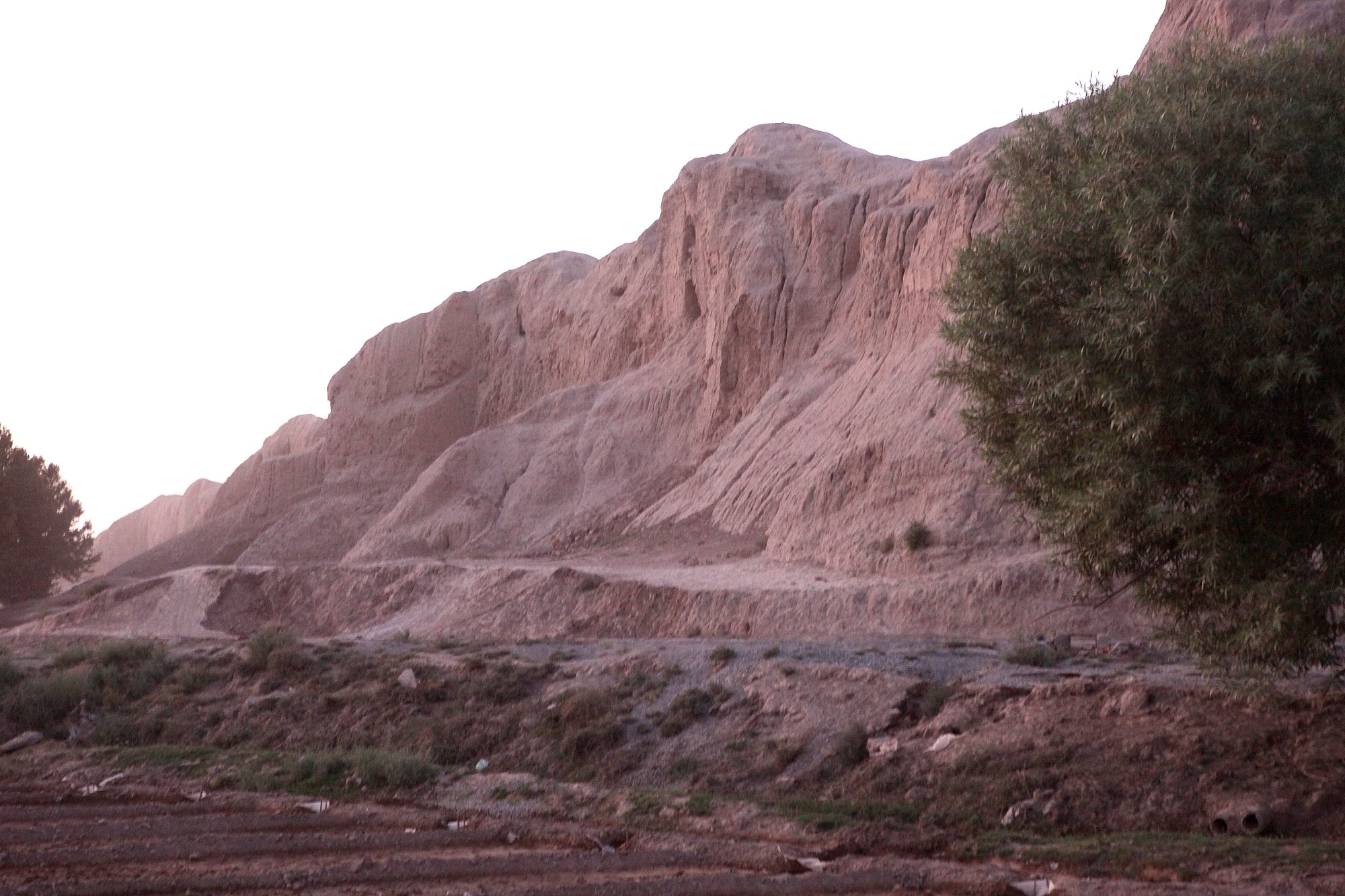
- The eroded walls of the Iraj Castle

- Location of the Iraj Castle on the map of Iran
- 35.3431°N 51.6808°E
- Type: Fortification
- Etymology: Mythical king Iraj
- Location: Pishva, Sasanian Empire (modern-day Asgarabad-e Abbasi, Pishva, Iran)

History
- Built: 4th or 5th century AD
- Built for: Sasanian army
- Original use: Military base

Site notes
- Elevation: 1,440 metres (4,720 ft)
- Height: 25 metres (82 ft)
- Area: 190 hectares (470 acres)
- Architectural style: Sasanian
- Current use: Agriculture
- Governing body: Cultural Heritage, Handicrafts and Tourism Organization of Pishva County

Iraj Castle (Persian: قلعه ایرج, romanized: Qal'eh Iraj) is a fortification built in 4th or 5th century AD in the central region of Ray, Sasanian Empire, near modern-day Asgarabad-e Abbasi, Pishva, Iran. The monument is known for its peculiar design: large defensive walls with embedded rooms and arches, with towers at regular intervals, enclosing a vast empty interior of 190 hectares (470 acres).

The design is similar to several other Sasanian campaign bases. The permanent service members supposedly occupied the walls and the rooms inside it, while the empty interior would be occupied by tents or used for training or military assemblies. It probably served as a central military base for operations elsewhere, especially against the incursions of nomadic nations in the north.

== Description and purpose ==
The structure consists of an empty area approximately 175 hectares (430 acres), surrounded by a wall 15–22 metres (49–72 ft) in width and up to 25 metres (82 ft) in height. It featured 148 densely spaced towers and four monumental gates. The massive walls contained a wealth of embedded structures: a row of around 828 rooms (circa 12 square metres (130 sq ft) in size) and hundreds of monumental arches, evoking royal Sasanian architecture. The structure was further protected by a ditch around the wall. A population of 2,000-6,000 could have been accommodated in the walls. Despite this strong architectural focus on the walls, there were no permanent buildings in the interior space.

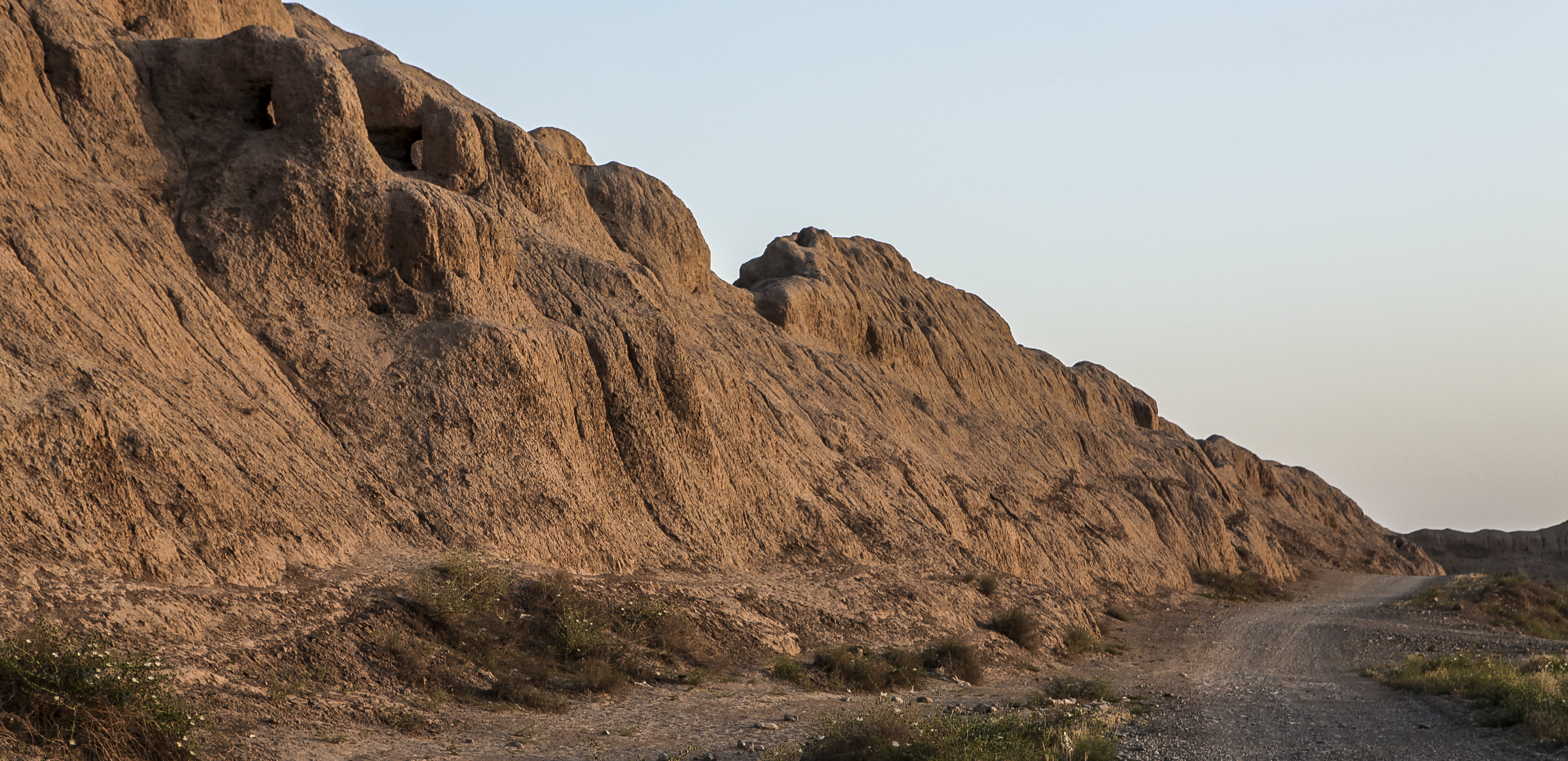
The eroded walls

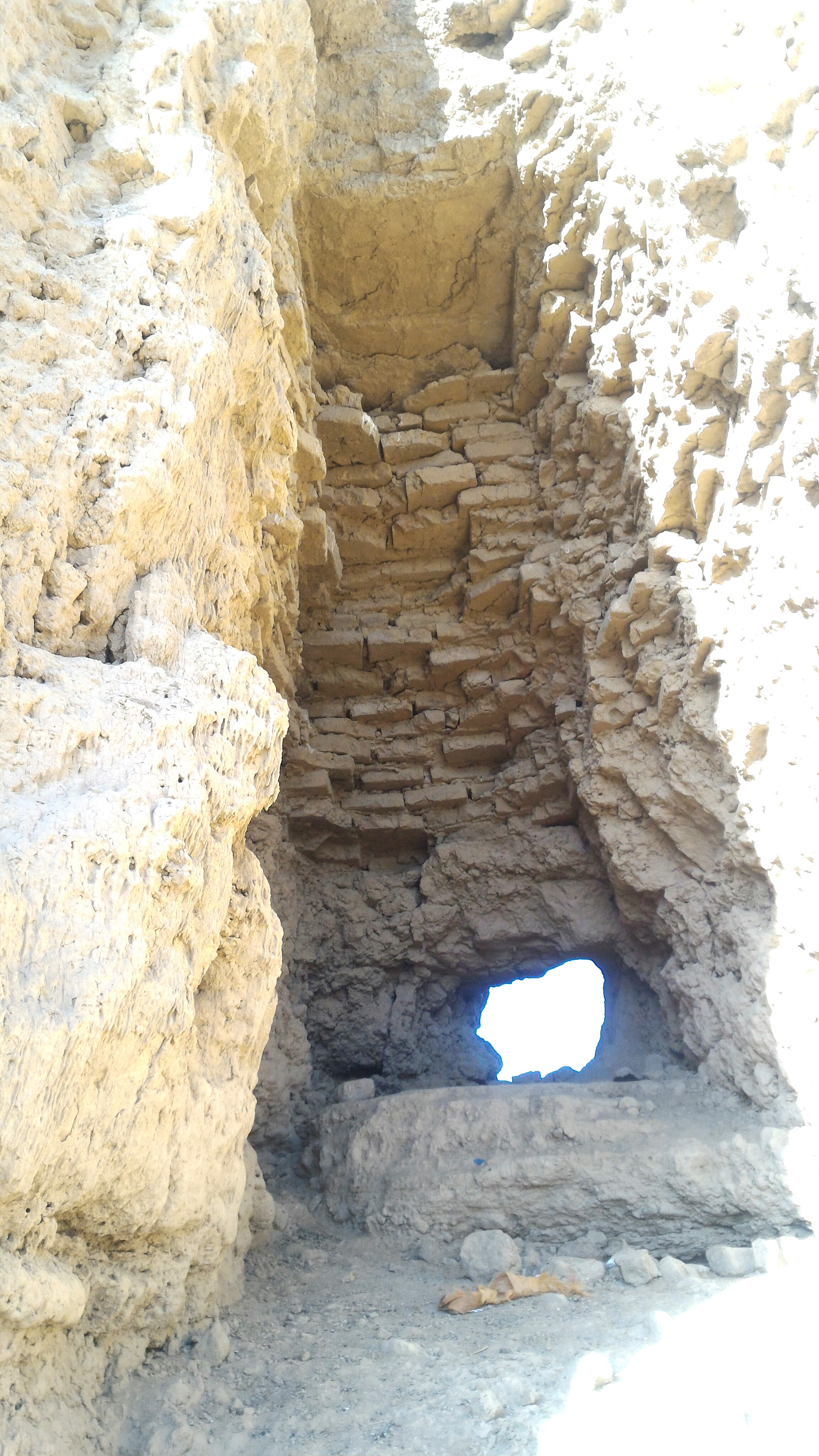
Remains of a room in the northern wall

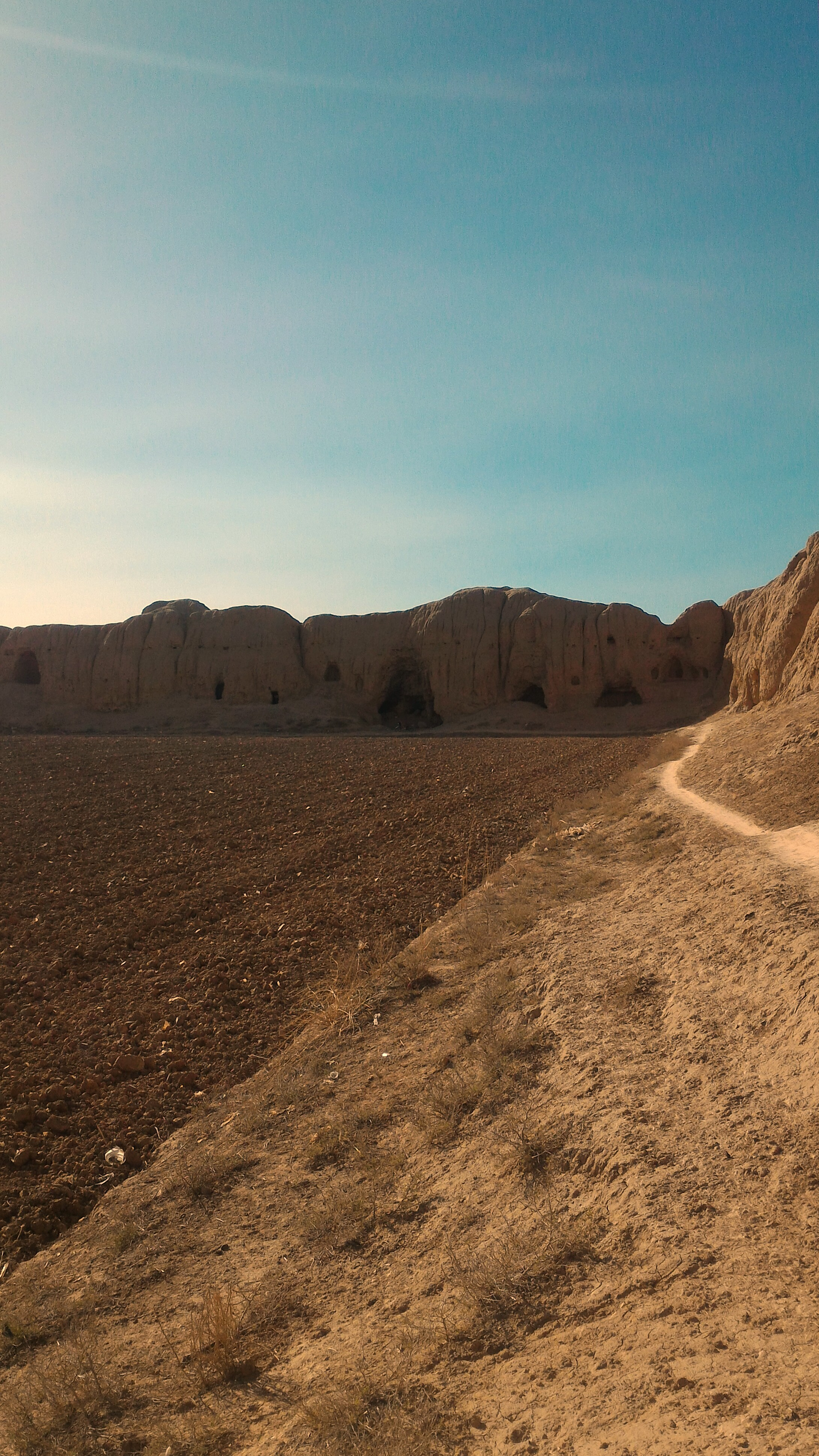
Remains of chambers north west of the site.

Popular beliefs identify the structure with the Citadel of Varena mentioned in the holy Zoroastrian text Vendidad. Archaeological studies suggest it was built probably in the final decades of the 4th century AD or the first quarter of the 5th century AD. Excavated Sasanian-era pottery, ostraca and bullae suggest it was occupied and abandoned within the Sasanian era. The structure's function had been previously described as a city, a military fortress, or a game park for the royal hunt, or of a possible prestige function.

Qaleh Iraj is the largest pre-modern, non-urban permanent fortification in South-west Asia, Europe and Africa. Other similarly vast military structures are Zadian in modern Afghanistan and the early Sasanian siege camp at Hatra, modern Iraq. The general design of Qaleh Iraj, i.e. massive fortifications and a massive empty interior, is similar to the Sasanian campaign bases Qaleh Pol Gonbad in the Gorgan Plain and Torpakh Kala near Derbent. Another example is Qaleh Kharabeh near the Great Wall of Gorgan which had accommodated two neatly aligned rows of tents with wide corridors in between, suggesting similar role of the interior space in other bases. Another similar structure is the late third-century BC Kazakl'i-Yatkan/Akchakhan-Kala in Chorasmia.

The plan of Hatra. Note the vast contravallation.

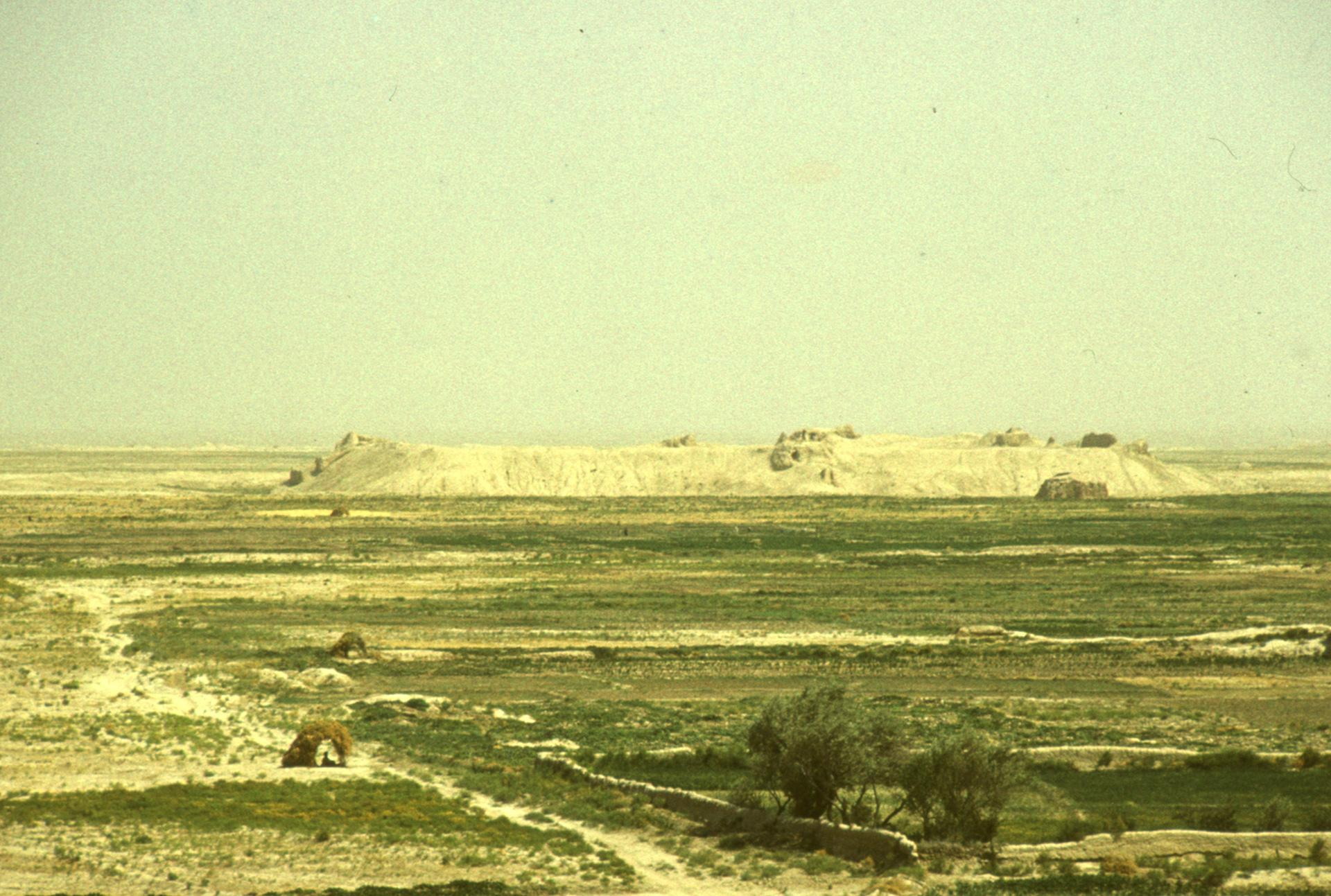
Zadian, Afghanistan

A total of about 50,000 warriors could have comfortably occupied the structure. The rooms may have housed the permanent garrison, while the open interior space was occupied temporarily.

Qaleh Iraj was probably built in response to northern nomadic invaders which, on some occasions, penetrated deep into the Sasanian territory. It probably functioned mainly as a central base for military operations elsewhere, especially at the northern frontiers. It may have been used for military training and/or military assemblies as well. The 36 hectares (89 acres) campaign base at Gabri Qaleh near Gonbad-e Kavus was built in the same period. Both thus predate the Great Wall of Gorgan. These Sasanian campaign bases may have been built before the northern frontiers were protected by the linear Sasanian defence lines.

The region Ray was suitable as a central base from several aspects. Sitting at the center of Greater Iran and on a central communication hub, it was always a militarily significant region. Plus, it was also the base of the powerful House of Mihran during the Sasanian period.

== Current status ==
Parts of the walls have been eroded, and out of the four gates, only the main, southern gate remains today. Iraj Castle is considered as the world's largest mud-brick fort with a height of 50 feet and an area of 200 hectares.

There have been attempts by the Cultural Heritage, Handicrafts and Tourism Organization of Iran in 2008 to designate it as a UNESCO World Heritage Site, but the efforts were abandoned due to "serious shortcomings" and the situation of the area, including the agricultural activities of local farmers in the interior of the structure.

Illegal excavation have damaged parts of the walls. On 26 May 2018, an illegal excavation was reported in the Northern Gate. Majid Zhaleh, the head of the Cultural Heritage, Handicrafts and Tourism Organization of Pishva County, stated that his organization lacks enough manpower.

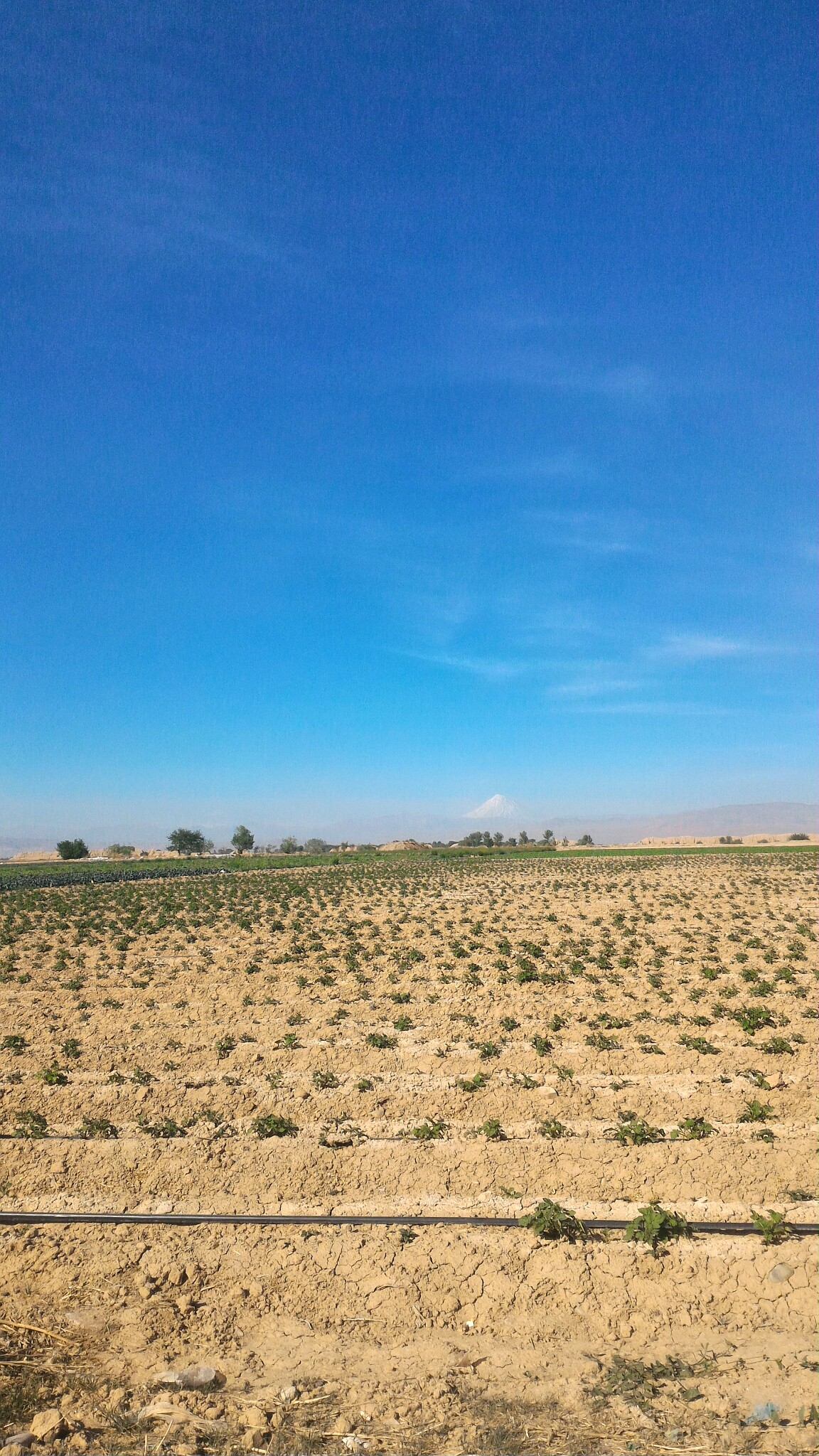
Contemporary farms inside the castle.

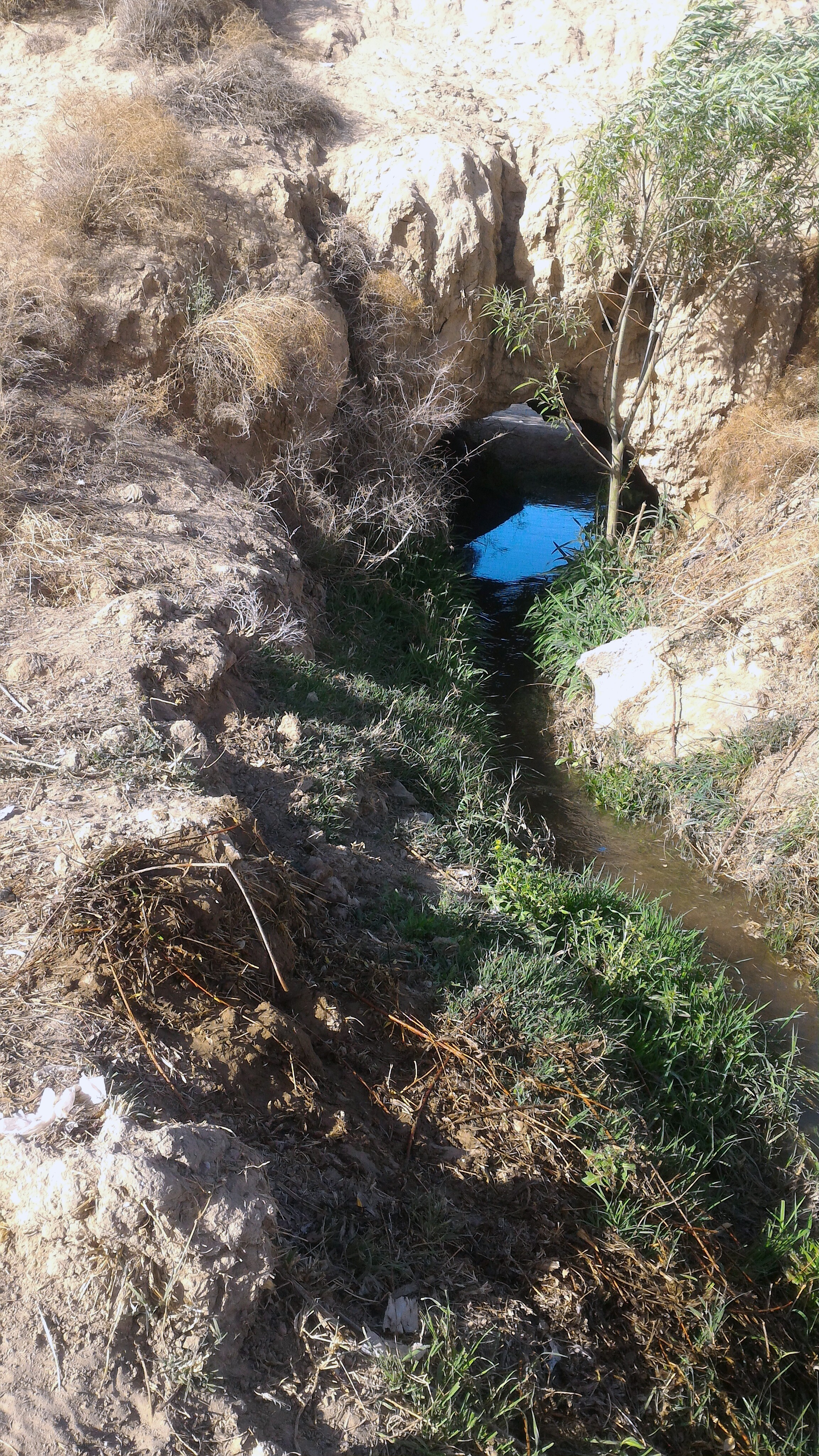
A contemporary water canal dug by farmers.

== See also ==
- Quadrangular castle
- Caravanserai
- Campus Martius
- List of castles in Iran
