= Gorgan Plain =

Plain in Golestan province, Iran

The Gorgan Plain (Persian: دشت گرگان, romanized: Dasht-e Gorgan), is situated in Golestan province, northeastern Iran. It extends from the lower slopes of the Alborz and Kopet Dag mountain ranges to the steppes of Turkmenistan. The River Gorgan flows through the plain from east to west, emptying into the Caspian Sea. The provincial capital Gorgan lies to the south of the plain, which covers an area of about 170 square kilometres (66 sq mi) and is situated between 37°00' and 37°30' north latitude, and between 54°00' and 54°30' east longitude. The annual precipitation in the south of the plain is about 600 mm (24 in) which is much higher than the 200 mm (8 in) just 60 km (37 mi) to the north. The southern part is very fertile, being watered by the many streams that flow from the Alborz Mountains.

== History ==
More than fifty Neolithic sites have been identified on the Gorgan Plain. Most are raised on mounds and many have seen more than one period of occupation. The sites are thought to relate to the Jeitun culture of southern Turkmenistan and may date to the sixth millennium BC, judging by the age of the artefacts found at Sang-i Chakmak. Other nearby sites include Yarim Tepe, and Tureng Tepe.

The Great Wall of Gorgan was built between about 420 AD and 530s AD by the Sasanian Empire on the northern edge of the plain between the Caspian Sea and the mountains. It stretched for nearly 200 km (124 mi) and protected the fertile plain from encroachment by White Huns from the north. The wall and forts along it were built of red mudbrick and fired brick, and to provide the water necessary for the manufacture of the bricks, a system of canals was dug across the plain; one canal paralleled the wall, which had to follow the natural gradient, while others were fed from supplier canals, which bridged the Gorgan River with the help of qanats. A mile to the south of the wall lies Qaleh Kharabeh, a fort that may have housed a garrison serving on the wall. It contains the remains of roadways and rows of mud-brick huts.
