= Jane Dieulafoy =

French archaeologist, explorer and writer (1851–1916)

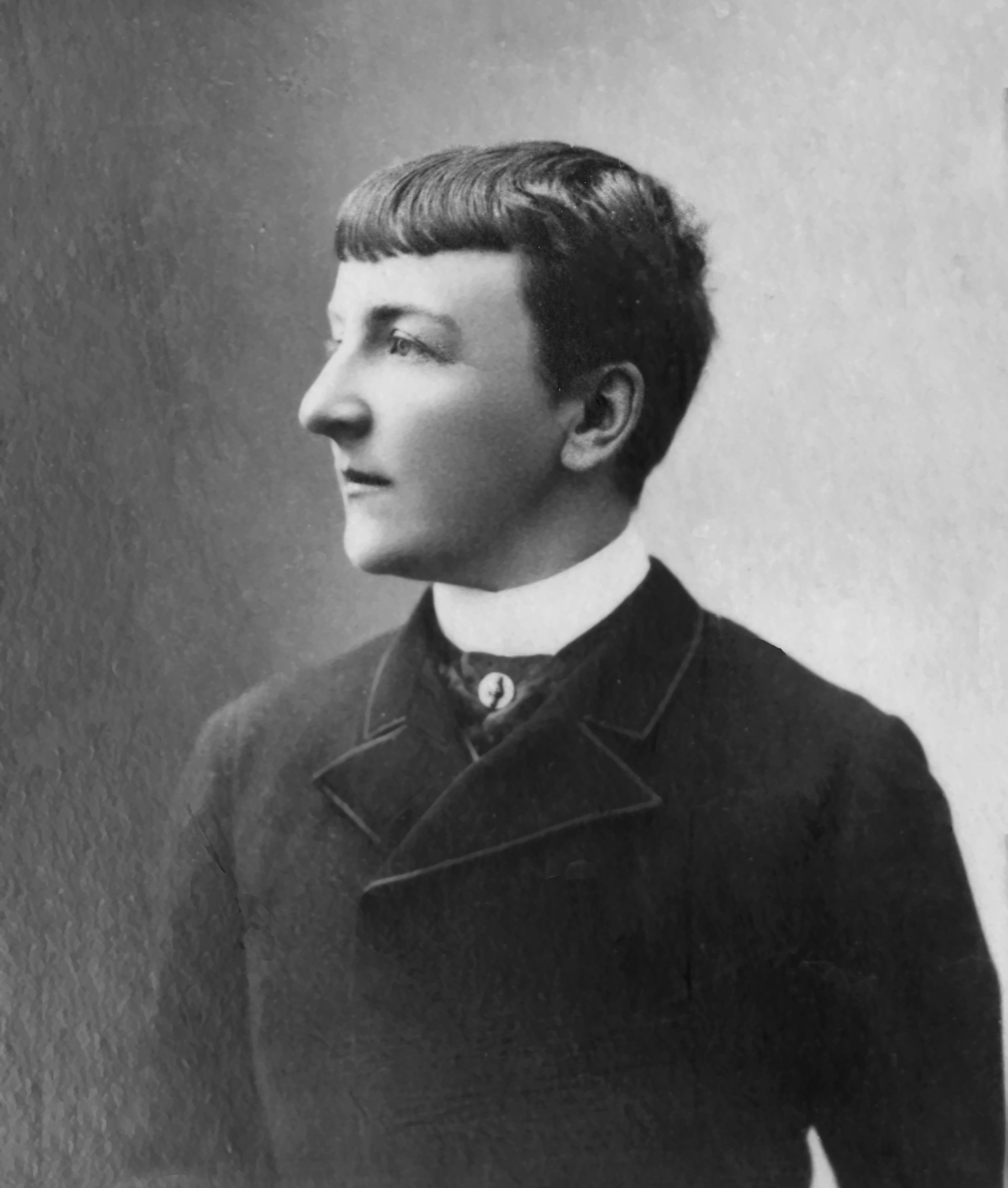
- Dieulafoy in c. 1895
- Born: 29 June 1851; Toulouse, France
- Died: 25 May 1916 (aged 64); Haute-Garonne, France
- Other names: Jeanne Henriette Magre; Jeanne Dieulafoy; Madame Dieulafoy

Academic work
- Main interests: Middle East, Iran
- Notable works: First French excavations at Susa

Jane Dieulafoy (29 June 1851 – 25 May 1916) was a French archaeologist, explorer, novelist, feminist and journalist. She was the wife of Marcel-Auguste Dieulafoy. She and her husband excavated the Ancient Persian city of Susa and made various discoveries some of which are displayed in the Louvre museum.

== Career ==
Jane Dieulafoy was born Jeanne Henriette Magre to a wealthy family of bourgeoisie merchants in Toulouse, France. She studied at the Couvent de l’Assomption d’Auteuil in a suburb of Paris from 1862 to 1870. She married Marcel Dieulafoy in May 1870, at the age of 19. That same year, the Franco-Prussian War began. Marcel volunteered, and was sent to the front. Jane accompanied him, wearing a soldier's uniform and fighting by his side.

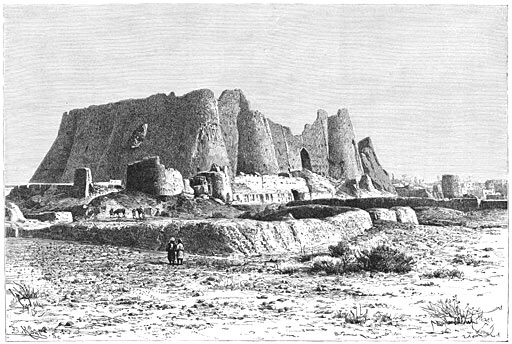
Citadel of Varamin by Jane Dieulafoy

With the end of the war, Marcel was employed by the Midi railways, but during the next ten years the Dieulafoys would travel in Egypt and Morocco for archaeological and exploration work. Jane did not keep a record of these journeys. Marcel became increasingly interested in the relationship between Oriental and Western architecture, and in 1879, decided to devote himself to archaeology.

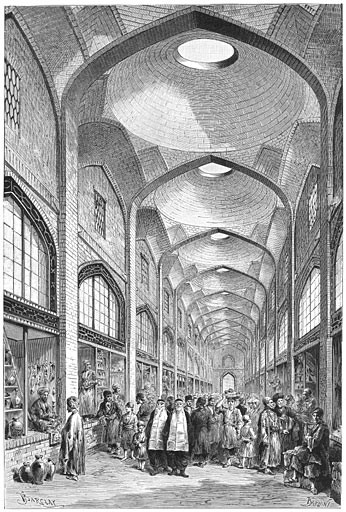
Vakil Bazaar of Shiraz, as seen by Jane Dieulafoy in 1881

The Dieulafoys first visited Qajar Iran in 1881–1882, and would return twice after that (the last time in 1884). The first journey was by freighter from Marseille to Constantinople, by a Russian boat to Poti on the east coast of the Black Sea, and then across the Caucasus, and via Azerbaijan to Tabriz. From there they travelled widely through Tehran, Isfahan, and Shiraz. Jane Dieulafoy documented the pair's explorations in photographs, illustrations, and writing. She took daily notes during her travels, which were later published in two volumes. Jane photographed monuments, archaeological remains, men, women and groups. After returning to France, from these photographs drawings and engravings were made by various artists, that were published in the travelogue La Perse, la Chaldee, la Susiane, containing 336 lithographs, including fifty portraits of women.

At Susa, the couple found numerous artifacts and friezes, several of which were shipped back to France. One such find is the famous Lion Frieze on display at the Louvre. Two rooms in the museum contain artefacts brought back by the Dieulafoy missions. For her contributions, the French government conferred upon her the title of Chevalier of the Legion of Honor in 1886. The transfer of the found objects to France caused considerable damage to the findings of Iranian archaeological excavations. Jane Dieulafoy says in her memoir about the Apadana Palace in Susa:

Yesterday I watched the large stone bull found in recent days with great regret, weighing about twelve thousand pounds! It is impossible to shake such a huge mass. Eventually I could not overcome my anger, grab a sledgehammer and fall into the rock. I hit it with a savage blow. The head of the column is broken as a result of a sledgehammer struck like a ripe fruit...

After their journeys in Iran, Dieulafoy and her husband spent time traveling in Spain and Morocco between 1888 and 1914. She also wrote two novels: Her first was Parysatis, in 1890, set in ancient Susa. It was later adapted into an opera by Camille Saint-Saëns. Her second, Déchéance, was published in 1897. Marcel volunteered to go to Rabat, Morocco, during World War I, and Jane accompanied him.

While in Morocco, her health began to decline. She contracted amoebic dysentery and was forced to return to France where she died in Pompertuzat in 1916. The childless couple left their home at 12, rue Chardin in Paris to the French Red Cross who continue to operate an office from the building to this day.

== Cross-dressing ==
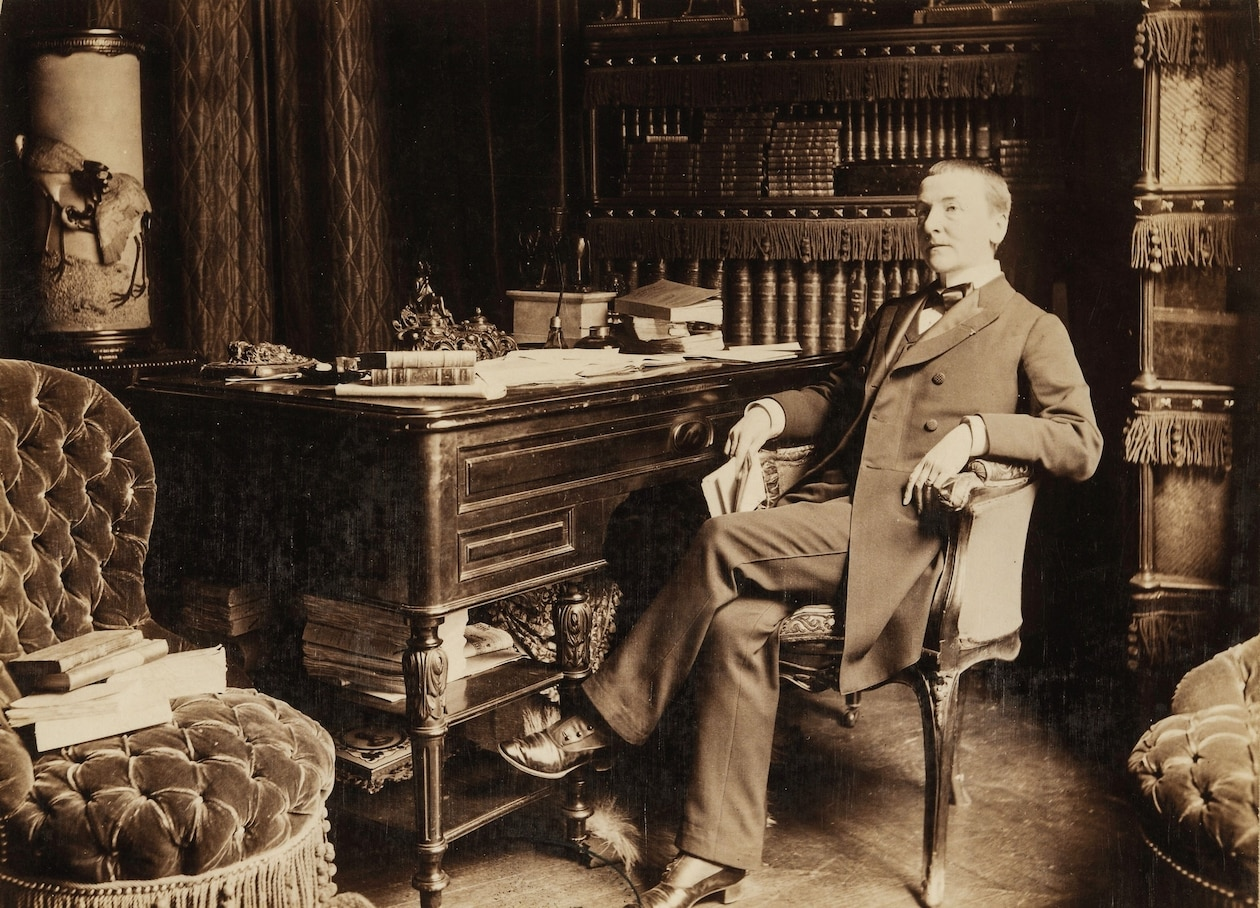
Dieulafoy in men's clothing, photographed by Dornac

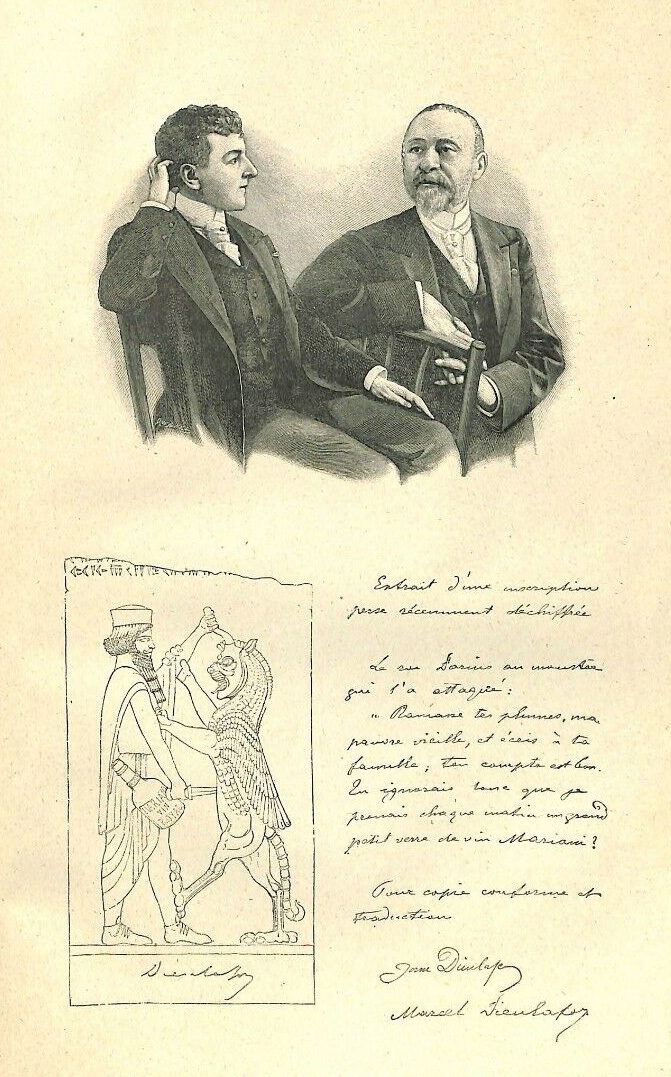
Jane (left, in men's clothing) with her husband

During her travels abroad, Jane Dieulafoy preferred to dress in men's clothing and to wear her hair short, because it was otherwise difficult for a woman to travel freely in a Muslim country. She had also dressed as a man when she fought alongside Marcel Dieulafoy during the Franco-Prussian War, and she continued to dress in men's clothing when she returned to France. This was against the law in France at the time, but when she returned from the Middle East she received special "permission de travestissement" (English: "permission to crossdress") from the prefect of police. Of her cross-dressing Dieulafoy wrote "I only do this to save time. I buy ready-made suits and I can use the time saved this way to do more work". She included many characters who cross-dress in her fiction, including her novels Volontaire and Frère Pélage.

Dieulafoy considered herself an equal to her husband, but was also fiercely loyal to him. She was opposed to the idea of divorce, believing it degraded women. During World War I, she petitioned for allowing women a greater role in the military. She was a member of the jury of the prix Femina literary prize from its creation in 1904 until her death.

== Bibliography ==
Major published works:

- La Perse, la Chaldée et la Susiane 1881–1882. Paris: Hachette. 1887.
- L'Orient sous le voile. De Chiraz à Bagdad 1881–1882 (vol 2). Paris. 1889.
- À Suse 1884–1886. Journal des fouilles. Paris: Hachette. 1888.
- Parysatis. Paris: A. Durand & Fils. 1890.
- Volontaire. Paris: Colin. 1892.
- Rose d'Hatra et L'Oracle (short stories). Paris: A. Colin et Cie. 1893.
- Frère Pélage. Paris: Alphonse Lemerre. 1894.
- Déchéance. Paris: Alphonse Lemerre. 1897.
- Aragon et Valence. Paris: Hachette. 1901.
- L'épouse parfaite (translation from Fray Luis de León). Paris: Bloud. 1906.
- Castille et Andalousie. Paris: Hachette. 1908.
- Isabelle la Grande. Paris: Hachette. 1920.
