= Shah Tepe =

Prehistoric archaeological site in Iran

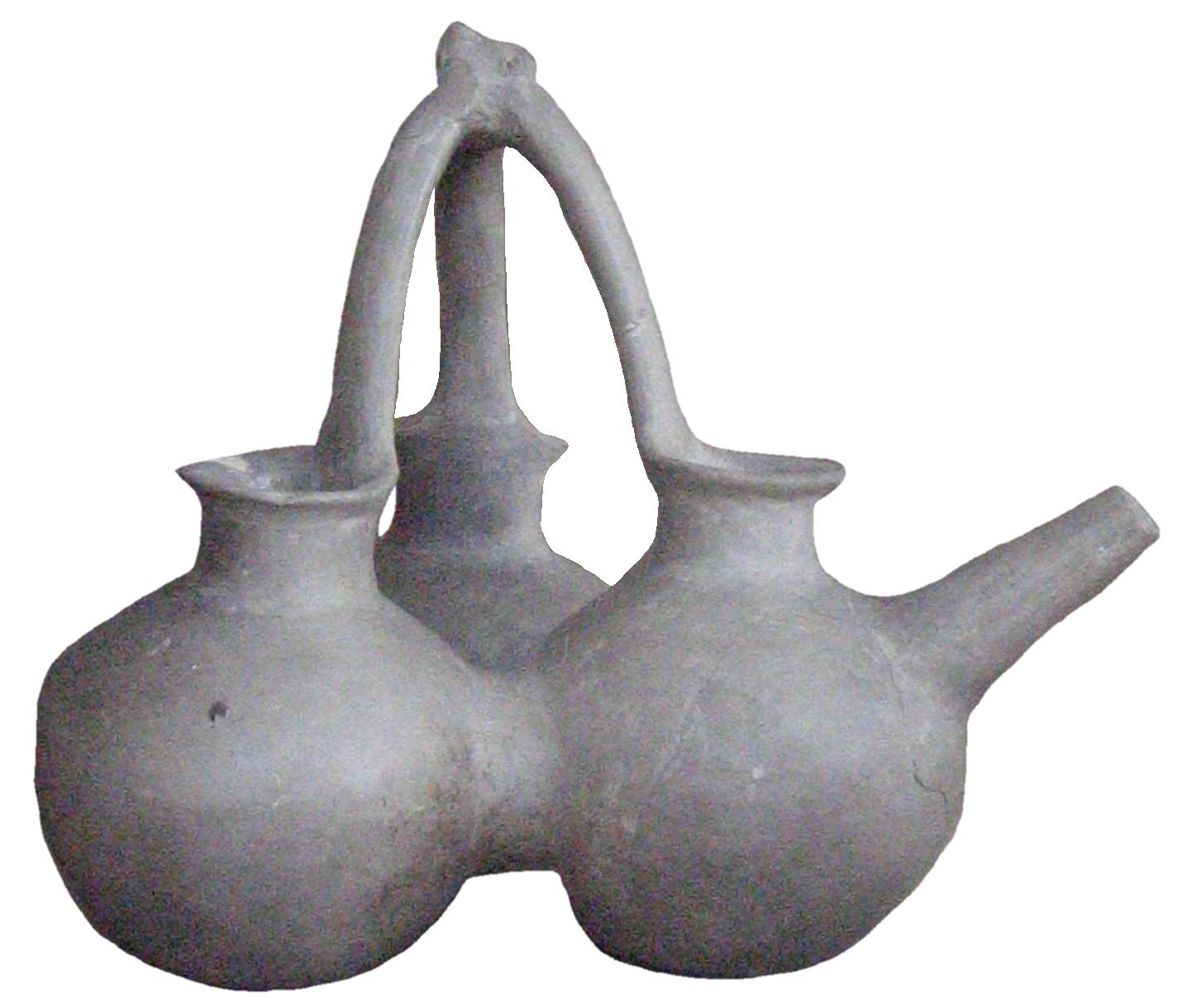

Shah Tepe is a prehistoric archaeological site located in the Gorgan Plain of Northeastern Iran, about 13 km north – northwest from the city of Gorgan and 20 km east of the Caspian Sea.

Topographically, it is an oval mound with a longitudinal axis pointing north – south. The eastern side is steeper and straighter, while the western is strongly rounded and more gently sloping. The length of the mound is about 165 meters and breadth 135 meters. The top of the mound forms a rather even plateau about 7 – 7.5 m in height. The highest point is 8.11 m.

The anthropic deposit of the site, excavated by the Swedish archaeologist T.J. Arne by means of eight square shafts (10 x 10 m; square E was 10 x 15 m) in 1933, witnesses three main periods of development. The archaeological material and photos from the excavations are kept at The Museum of Mediterranean and Near Eastern Antiquities.

The earliest (Shah III) is dated back to the Chalcolithic period and is represented by numerous graves containing black or grey ware and painted pottery decorated by black patterns on a reddish ground. Shah IIB and IIA are both referred to the Bronze Age and contain burials characterized by black or grey pottery and alabaster vessels. The uppermost layer (Shah I) contained Muslim graves in association with other material of the same period.

As a rule, the graves seem to have been dug under the floor of the houses, perhaps also elsewhere but not in a special cemetery. About 260 skeletons graves were found, a small number of them disturbed. Of 257 skeletons, 176 were prehistoric and 81 belong to the muslim period. With rare exception, the prehistoric skeletons lay contracted on their side in a simple, individual pit. Almost half of the skeletons were oriented in a more or less easterly direction. In two cases mother and child had been buried together and in one case two adults, possibly man and wife. One collective burial has been identified: it contained five individuals, whose bodies were mutilated and accompanied by offerings of sheep and goats. The corpses were usually accompanied by vessels of clay and alabaster in large and small numbers, ornaments of copper, beads of various kinds of stone, copper, faience and glass, occasional ornaments and implements of bone and stone. Very rare were the weapons.

== Bibliography ==
- T.J. Arne 1935, The Swedish Archaeological Expedition to Iran, 1932-1933, Copenhagen: Acta Archaeologica 6.
- T.J. Arne 1945, Excavations at Shah Tepé, Iran, Stockholm, 1945.
