= Shir Ashian Tepe =

Iranian national heritage site

Coordinates: 36°05′26″N 54°11′29″E

Shir Ashian Tepe (Shir-e Shian, Šir-āšiān) is a prehistoric archaeological site in the Semnan Province of Iran, situated in Shir Ashian, about 15 kilometres southwest of Damghan.

Occupation appears to have been restricted to a relatively short period during the mid-5th century BCE.

== Excavation ==
The site was discovered by Erich Schmidt (1897–1964) in 1931 in a survey of the Damghan region. It was excavated in July 1932. Despite the presence of pottery fragments, excavation failed to find any remains of buildings. Two explanations have been suggested. One, by Schmidt, posits that the site was merely a temporary encampment; the other suggests that the site has been eroded, removing any constructions but leaving the surface pottery and shallow graves.

== Transitional period ==
The sherds from Shir-e Shian are comparable to sherds found in north-central Iran (late Tepe Sialk II phase) and in southern Turkmenistan (Anau IA phase), dating to the mid-fifth millennium BCE. Thus Shir-e Shian may represent the transitional period between the Sialk II and Sialk III periods in north-central Iran, preceding the beginning of Tepe Hissar IA period. And also, it can be seen as transitional between the Cheshmeh-Ali and Hissar IA periods.

The important site of Tepe Hissar is located about 20 km from Shir Ashian Tepe.
