= Tepe Hissar =

Archaeological site in Semnan province, Iran

- Tappeh Hesār
- Location within Iran
- 36.1545°N 54.3850°E
- Periods: Chalcolithic and Bronze Age
- Location: Semnan province, Iran

Site notes
- Excavation dates: 1931–1932, 1972, 1976, 1995
- Archaeologists: Erich Schmidt, Robert H. Dyson, Maurizio Tosi (it), Giuseppe Tucci, Esmaeil Yaghmaei

Iran National Heritage List
- Official name: Tappeh Hissar
- Type: Mound
- Designated: 1931
- Reference no.: 40
- Conservation organization: Cultural Heritage, Handicrafts and Tourism Organization of Iran

Tepe Hissar also spelled Tappeh Hesār (Persian: تپه‌حصار) is an ancient Near Eastern archaeological site in Semnan province in northeastern Iran about 360 kilometers east of modern Tehran. It is located near the village Heydarabad two kilometers southeast of the medieval town of Damghan.

The site is notable for its uninterrupted occupational history from the 5th to the 2nd millennium BC. The quantity and elaborateness of its excavated artifacts and funerary customs position the site prominently as a cultural bridge between Mesopotamia and Central Asia. It is thought to have been a stop on the Great Khorasan Road.

In recent scholarship, Greater Khorasan refers to an extensive interaction sphere in Central Asia during the Middle and Late Bronze Age. The emergence of complex societies during this period is observed especially in southern Central Asia. Thus, during 2400–1500 BCE, the rise of the Greater Khorasan Civilization (GKC) is being considered.

Expeditions in 1931–32 by the University of Pennsylvania and 1976 by the University of Pennsylvania Museum revealed that the site was inhabited from 3900 to 1900 BC. Evidence was uncovered of pottery-making and metallurgy. A large Sasanian era palace was also uncovered.

== Archaeology ==
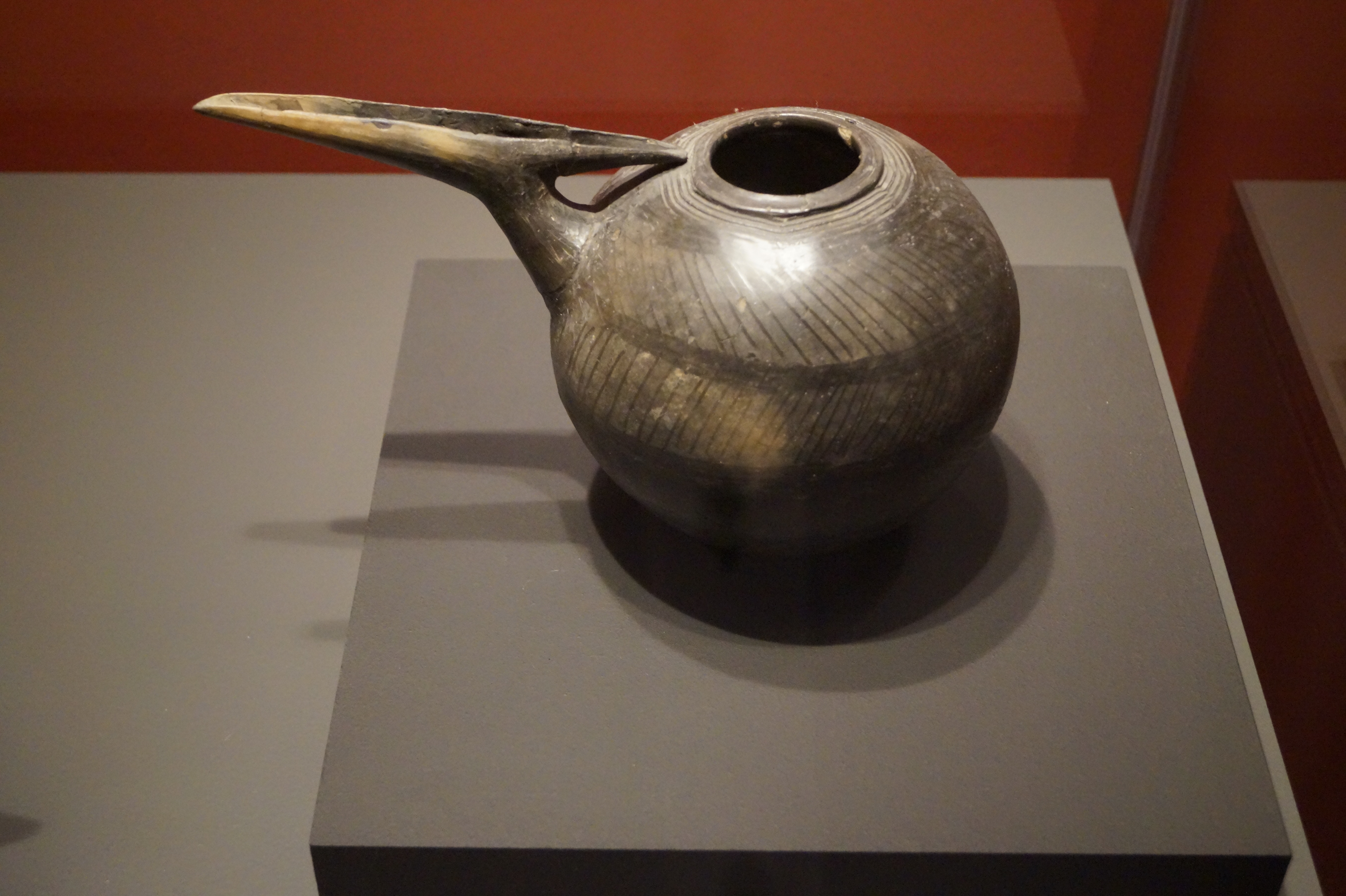
Ancient pottery from Tepe Hissar Strata IIIC

The 6 hectare site of Tepe Hissar has a total diameter of about 600 meters rising about 7 meters above the plain. It consists of a 200 meter by 300 meter main mound with a lower terrace extending to the north and with 5 smaller hillocks lying mostly to the southwest with a few scattered flat settlement areas. A small hillock on the east edge of the main mound was designated Treasure Hill after two very rich Strata IIIC buried hoards were found there. The site was eroded and a deep gulch divided it. The surface of the main mound contained a number of burials. Examination of the largest hillock found it to hold the remains of a Sassanian building.

The site was first discovered in 1877 by Albert Houtum-Schindler who noted that locals were digging at the site in hopes of finding artifacts. In 1925, Ernst Herzfeld examined the site as part of a regional survey, recommended it for excavations, and also noted the looting. It was then excavated in two seasons, from July until mid-November 1931 and May through November 1932, by Erich Schmidt, on behalf of the University of Pennsylvania Museum.

The important site of Tureng Tepe is located about 90 km (56 mi) north of Hissar, and has some parallels to Hissar.

A related site of Shir Ashian Tepe is located about 20 km southwest of Hissar; it helped to clarify the chronology of Hissar.

== Metal production ==
The presence of full-time specialists seems to be attested already in the first Chalcolithic period. Regarding the metal production, already in Hissar I period, both weapons (daggers, knife blades, arrowheads) and other tools (pins, tacks, points and needles) were made.

In Hissar II and III copper artifacts increase in quality and variety and include personal ornaments (earrings, pendants, bracelets, bands), tools and weapons (bidents, lances, mattocks, chisels, mace heads), and luxury items (vessels, mirrors, boxes and intricately cast pins and rods).

In the second half of the fourth millennium (ca 3500-3000 BC), Hissar became a major site of metalworking and processing of gemstones, especially lapis lazuli. Thus, the city became the centre of extensive intra-cultural and trans-cultural trade relationships in the region, involving also long distance trade, especially with the Bactria–Margiana Archaeological Complex.

According to Neda Moradi (2024),

"Tepe Hissar was part of the so-called "interaction sphere" of Central Asia, spanning from the early fourth millennium to the beginning of the second millennium BCE. This cultural sphere covered a vast area from southern Mesopotamia to the Indus Valley, including Iranian plateau, the Persian Gulf region, Afghanistan, and western Central Asia, where powerful political-economic systems were established around 3500 BCE."

== Chronology ==
The first season focused on the Sassanian mound and initial work on the main mound. The excavators determined a relative chronology of the site, dividing it into a number of layers. Note that unlike usual practice strata are numbers from oldest to most recent.

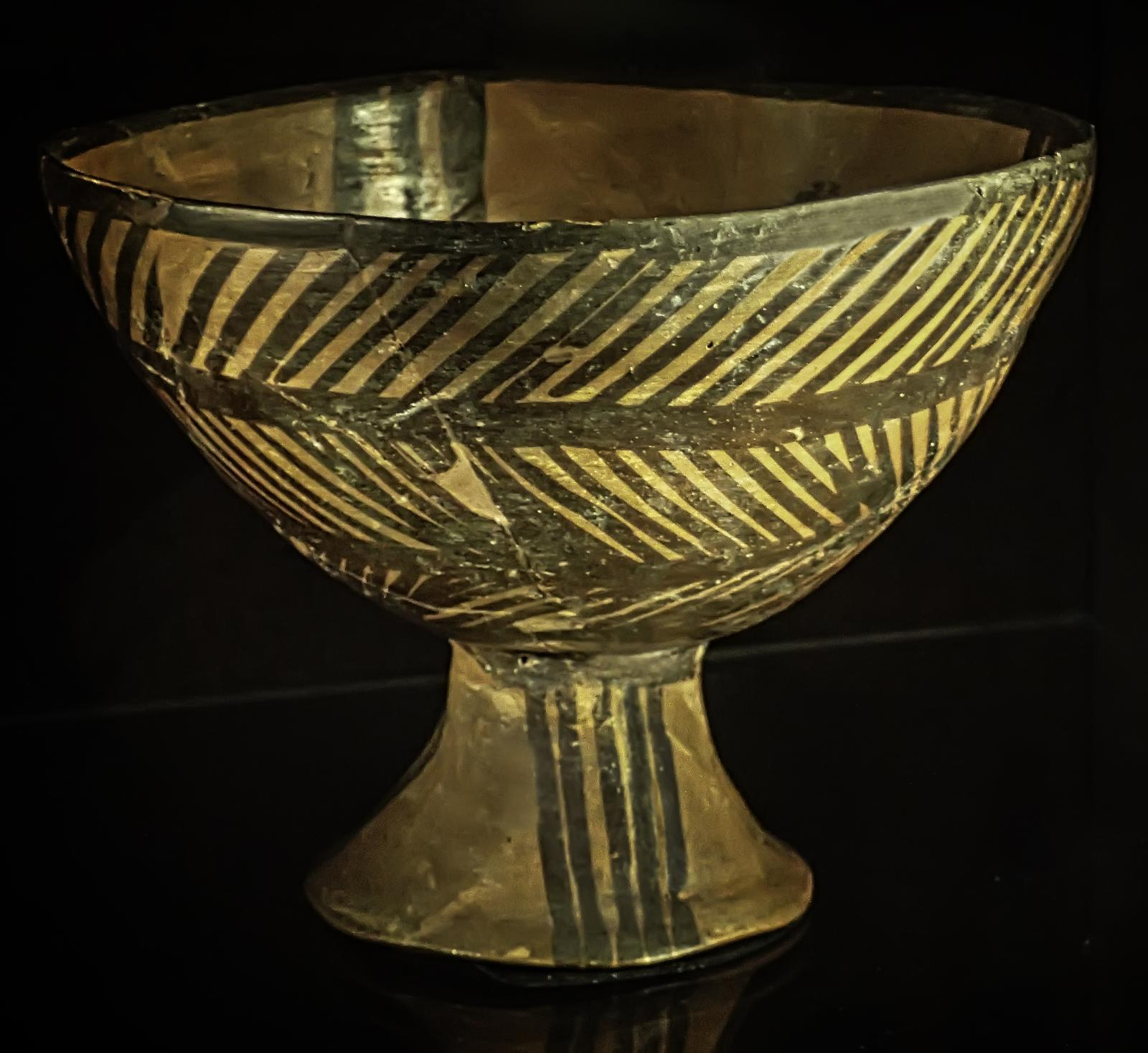
Painted Redware pottery from Tepe Hissar Strata IB

- Strata I (subdivided into IA, IB, and IC) - painted pottery. Only examined in soundings so full extent is unknown though it is estimated to have covered and area with a diameter of 200 meters. Building were constructed with sun-dried mud bricks. Some walls were buttressed. Subdivisions are based on pottery with IA being handmade with rectilinear designs, IB being wheelmade decorated with animal or floral motifs and IC wheelmade with dark brown decoration on a light grayish brown ground. Clay finds included spindle whorls, cones, bicones, dics, and figurines. A number of seals were found but no sealings leading to the idea they were being used as decoration. Copper objects (in IA) included knife and dagger blades, pins, and needles. Numerous lithic and bone objects were also excavated as well as 144 burials.
- Strata II (subdivided into IIA and IIB) - grey pottery. IIA featured wheelmade pottery with motifs similar to Strata IC while decoration changed somewhat in IIB. Strata II is the thinnest of the layers and assumed to have been the shortest occupation though this is not certain. Buildings construction and plan were similar to Strata I so this Strata is largely defined by pottery type. Small finds, lithics, figurines etc., were also similar to Strata I. More copper objects and types appeared including maceheads, rings, bracelets, anklets, earrings, and various tools. A few small gold and silver ornaments were found. Of the 209 burials excavated, those in IIA contained more and varied grave goods.

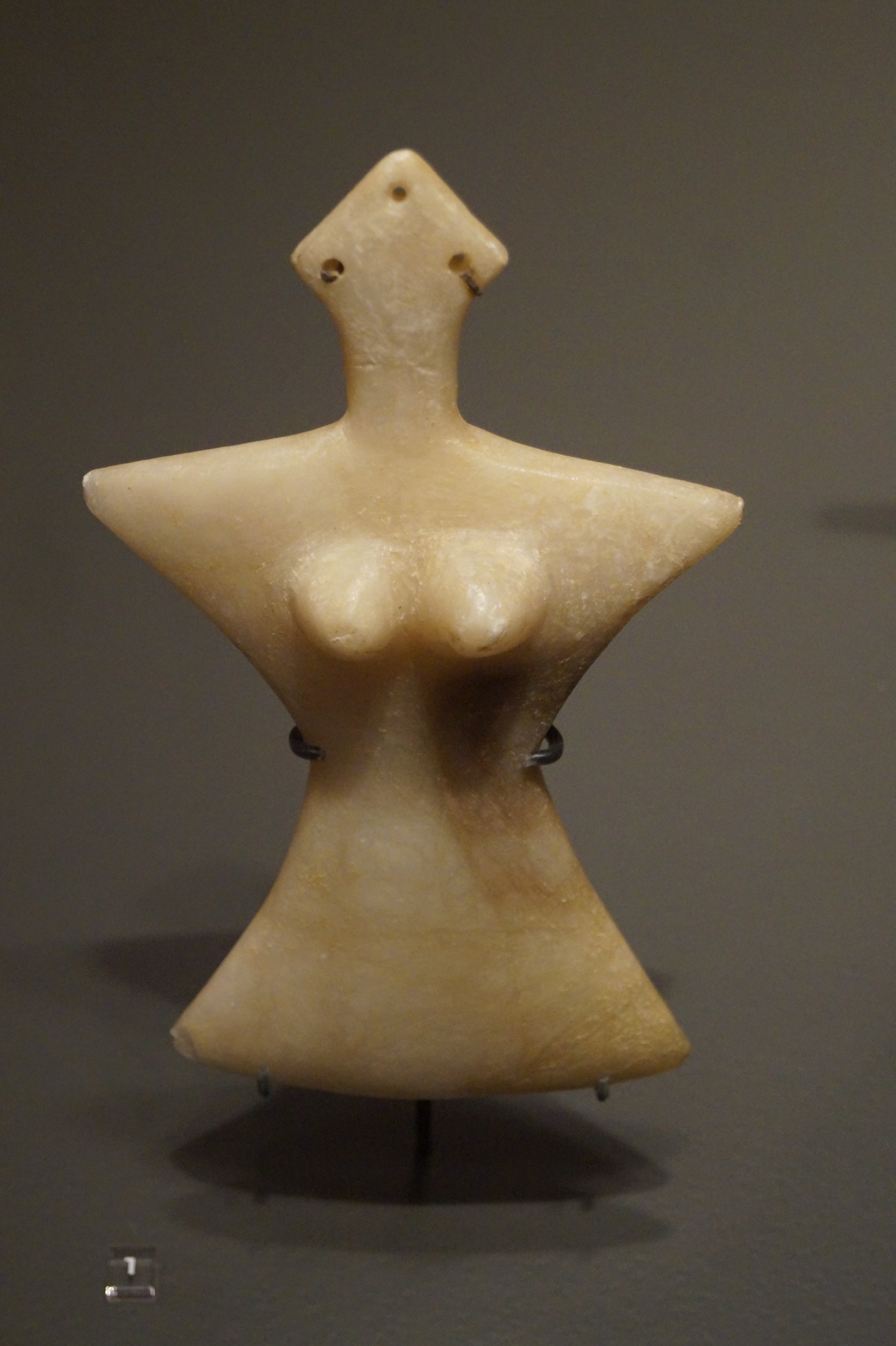
Figurine from Tepe Hissar, Strata IIIC, Alabaster

- Strata III (subdivided into IIIA, IIIB, and IIIC) - handmade burnished greyware pottery. The oldest level, IIIA is minimal and ill-defined and its principle value is in making clear the demarcation between Strata IIB and Strata IIIB. The final and most recent layer at Tepe Hissar, IIIC, is also very thin and the buildings are few and insignificant however burials from that layer are "extraordinarily well-equipped" and the buried hoards on Treasure Hill was particularly rich in finds. Strata IIIB was the principle occupation layer including some structures destroyed by conflagration. One, called the Burned Building (BB) was, unlike the others, burned while occupied and still retaining its possessions. This occurrence provided the excavators with a number of skeletal remains and finds as well as baking the mudbrick walls. The BB was the best constructed and elaborate building in Strata IIIB with six rooms (with several stairways leading to the roof), gateway passage, courtyard, outside latrine, and a tower at the door. The excavators declared it the residence of the towns most prominent resident and not a cultic site. Finds in the main room included numerous lapis lazuli, chalcedony, gold, and silver ornaments, copper daggers (one with a grip of silver bands), and large copper vessels. A storeroom contained a number of sizable lidded storage vessels as well as a copper mattock and two copper stamp seals. A large numbers of flint arrowheads were found inside and outside of the BB. Baked clay and lithic finds from Strata III were similar to those of Strata II while metal finds were much more numerous and varied, primarily of copper and silver. Burials excavated were 106 of Strata IIIA, 270 of Strata IIIB and 53 of Strata IIIC. After Strata IIIC the site was abandoned.

While the majority of burials were simple pit graves (a few double burials) where the body was wrapped in woolen garments, five cist graves, one "vault" grave, and one communal grave were also found. One cist grave (CG25, Strata II, adult male) was notable for its grave goods which included "a large copper stamp seal hung from his pelvic bone, a mace head, along with an abundance of copper jewelry, earrings and multiple-coil bracelets near his head and on his arm, copper pins with double scroll heads on his chest, a silver head band, and lapis lazuli, carnelian, turquoise beads scattered on his chest". The communal grave (CG15, Strata II-III, mostly males and infants) contained a variety of grave goods, primarily copper ornaments, a copper mattock, and a copper knife. Five of the pit graves were of high status with many grave items, often of copper - "Dancer" (CF55 x1), "Warrior 1" (DF19 x2); "Warrior 2" (DF09 x1); "Priest" (DF08 x1) and "Little Girl" (DF18 x1) all dated to Strata IIIC.

A one-week surface survey for lithic (stone) finds was carried out by a team led by Giuseppe Tucci with the Italian Archaeological Mission in Iran in 1972. Thousands of lithic tools, mostly fragmentary, were found primarily drills, burins, blades, and scrapers. In 1976 a two month long re-study project was performed, utilizing modern methods of stratigraphic assessments, ceramic typological analysis and radiocarbon dating led by Robert H. Dyson and Maurizio Tosi for the University of Pennsylvania Museum, the University of Turin and Iran Center for Archaeological Research. After a surface survey four stratigraphic cuts were made, three on the main mound and one on an hillock to the southwest. The study included a cleaning and replacing of the Strata IIB Burned Building, finding an additional room and hearth and showing the "tower" of the excavators was actually a buttress. In association with that on the Damghan Plain two surveys were conducted. A geomorphological survey found that Tepe Hissar was settled on a natural hill that was next to a river that now flows further to the east. A surface survey found no other sites from the same period as Tepe Hissar. In 1995, a rescue excavation, due to an earlier rail line being run through the center of the site, was conducted by v, followed by areal soundings in 2006.

The absolute chronology of the occupation levels, especially Strata IIIB and IIIC have been an issue of continuing research and speculation. The original excavators were uncertain but suggested Strata 1A began in the 5th millennium BC, IC ended around 3500 BC, and Strata III lay in the early 2nd millennium BC. Proposals for the end date of Hissar IIIC have ranged from 2300 BC down to 1500 BC. There has also been much speculation of the regional and cultural influences of Strata IIIB and IIIC. Cultural connections have been proposed as far away as Turkmenistan and the Oxus Civilization. Radiocarbon dates of levels thought to be chronologically contemporary with some at Tepe Hissar are available i.e. Tureng Tepe (II - 3055 BC, 2813 BC) (IIIB - 2639 BC), Altyndepe (IIIB - 2696 BC), and Yarim Tepe (IIIB - 2626 BC). A single Tepe Hissar radiocarbon date from a sample taken in 1974 provided a calibrated date of 1841 BC +/- 64 for the end of Strata IIIC. As part of the 1976 re-excavation a number of stratified samples were taken for radiocarbon dating from four locations, Main Mound (Buildings 1, 2, and 3), North Flat (Burned building area), South Hill (industrial workshop), and Twins). Results were:

- Strata I, painted pottery, (6 samples) - 1st half of 4th millennium BC
- Strata II, greyware pottery, lapis lazuli working and copper smelting (20 samples) - 2nd half of 4th millennium BC
- Strata IIIB, burnished greyware pottery (2 samples) - 2nd half of 3rd millennium BC
- Strata IIIC, end of occupation (1 sample) - 1st quarter of 2nd millennium BC

Further confusing the matter, the 1976 excavators kept Schmidt's strata for burials but invented a new set of construction and occupation "stages" (A, B, C1, C2, D1, D2, D3, E1, E2, E3, F1, F2, and F3) in reverse chronological order. As a sample:

- Stage A = Strata IIIC (c. 2200 BC - 1800 BC)
- Stage E = Strata IIA (c. 3650 BC - 3400 BC)
- Stage F = Strata IC (c. 3900 BC - 3700 BC)

In 2016 DNA was extracted from a human skeletal sample (Strata not identified in source) and was found to carry a mtDNA Haplogroup of H32.

== History ==
=== Chalcolithic ===
There is considerable cultural continuity from the early Cheshmeh Ali-period settlements in Iran, and into the later Hissar period.

"Traditionally, the early ceramic sequence of north-eastern Iran begins with Neolithic Soft Wares (c. 6000 BC), then Djeitun wares (sixth millennium BC), Cheshmeh Ali "clinky" wares (c. 5300–4300? BC), and finally Hissar IA wares."

==== Hissar I ====
The earliest dating is uncertain but established as after 5000 BC in the Chalcolithic period. This period (Hissar IA and IB) is characterized by mud-bricks buildings and hand-made (IA) and fine wheel-made (IB) ware, decorated with geometric, plant and animal patterns. The most widespread shapes are represented by small cups, bowls and vases.

=== Early Bronze Age ===
==== Hissar II ====
In the second period (Hissar IIA and IIB), dated to the 4th millennium BC and the beginning of the 3rd, the burnished grey ware becomes predominant and the large number of lapis lazuli beads and alabaster finds, as well as the evidence of large-scale production of copper-based alloys and lead-silver, suggests that the site was playing a very important role in the trade and export of metal artifacts and semi-precious stones from the Middle Asia quarries to Mesopotamia and Egypt.

Agriculture. The subsistence economy was based on agriculture. From Hissar II onward plant remains indicate "an agricultural system based on cereals [glume and free-threshing wheats, naked and hulled barley] and the utilization of local fruit [olive, grapevine] plant resources". Lentil seeds, peas and legumes were also present. Animal (cattle, goat and sheep) figurines indicate herding activities.

Writing. A single unpublished tablet (excavation number H 76–122) with three symbols was found at the site as well as an unknown number of tablet blanks. A radiocarbon date from the Strata II layer associated with the findspot, a lapis lazula work area, gave a calibrated date of 3650 BC to 3370 BC, too early for Proto-Elamite. It appears to be of a type generally called "numerical tablets" or "impressed tablets", mostly found at Susa and Uruk.

==== Hissar III ====
The third period of development (Hissar IIIA, IIIB and IIIC, chronologically attributed to the second half of the 3rd millennium BC and the beginning of the 2nd (Bronze Age), can be described as a proto-urban phase, mainly characterized by increased wealth, demographic concentration, mass production of plain ware and the construction of large public and ceremonial buildings. The finding of mass burials and individuals showing signs of violence have been interpreted as either due to warfare or interpersonal violence.

According to Matthews (2022),

"In concert with almost all other areas of Iran, the north-eastern regions of Iran host a major decline in settlement and in evident socio-political complexity at the turn of the third-second millennia BC. At Tepe Hissar, the sophisticated architecture of level IIIB was replaced by poorly planned structures at the start of Hissar IIIC."

=== Late Antiquity ===
==== Sasanian era ====
A large Sasanian era building, built with large baked bricks and termed a palace by the excavators, was explored on a hillock near the main mound. It contained large (6 feet in diameter) ornamented stucco columns. The building was decorated with polychrome painting. Finds included a number of plaques, a bust, and a few copper coins.

== Gallery ==
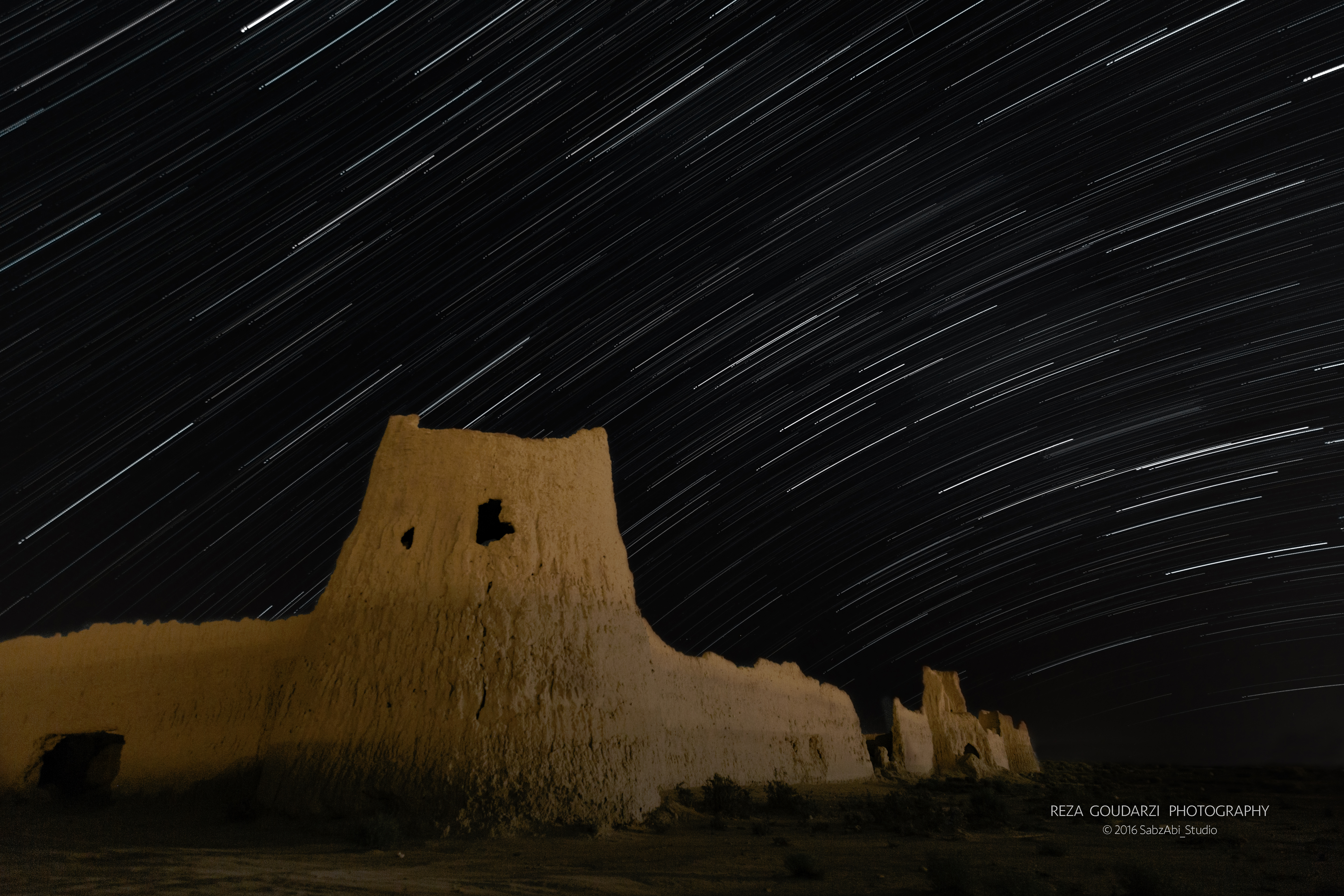

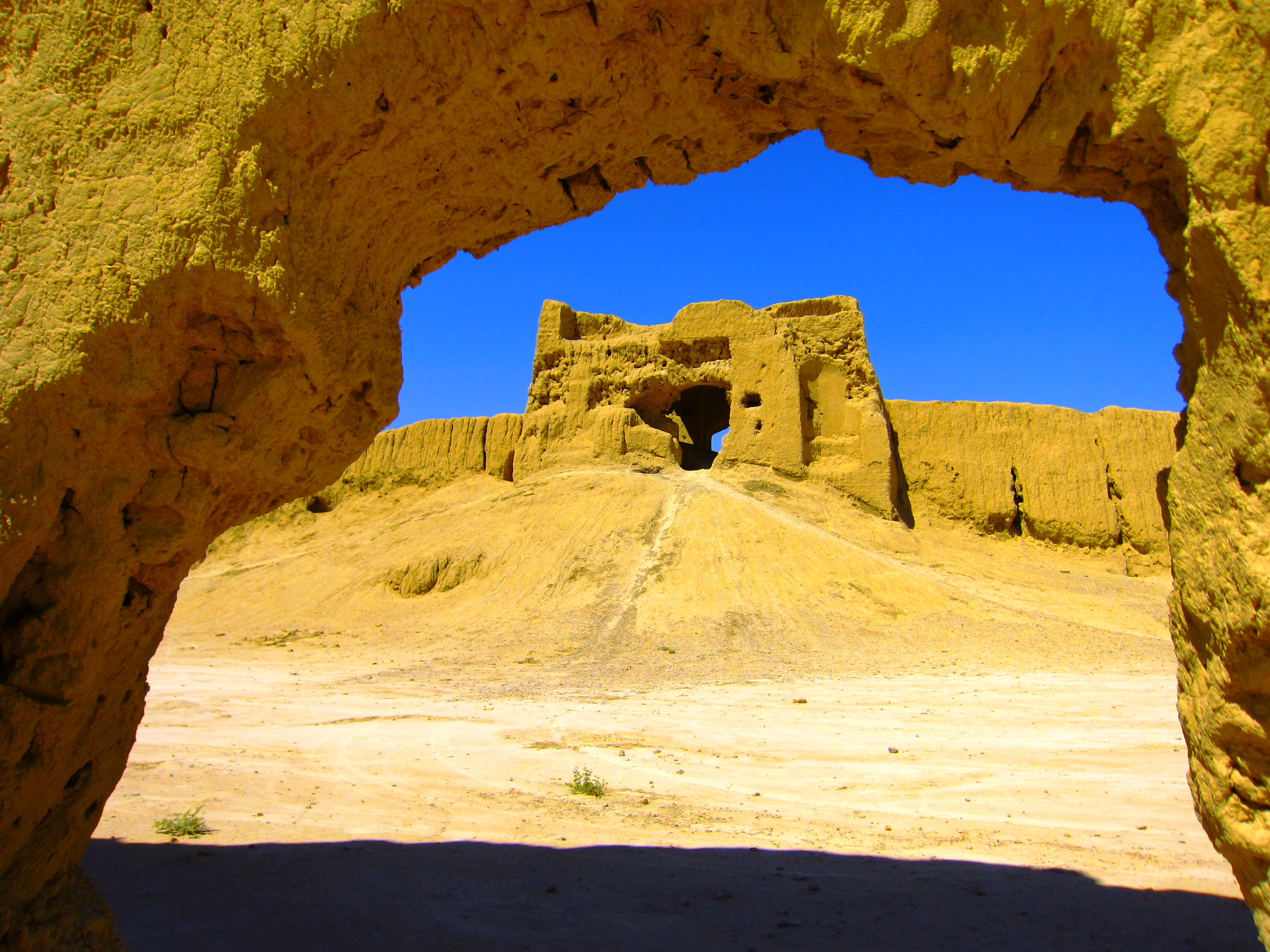

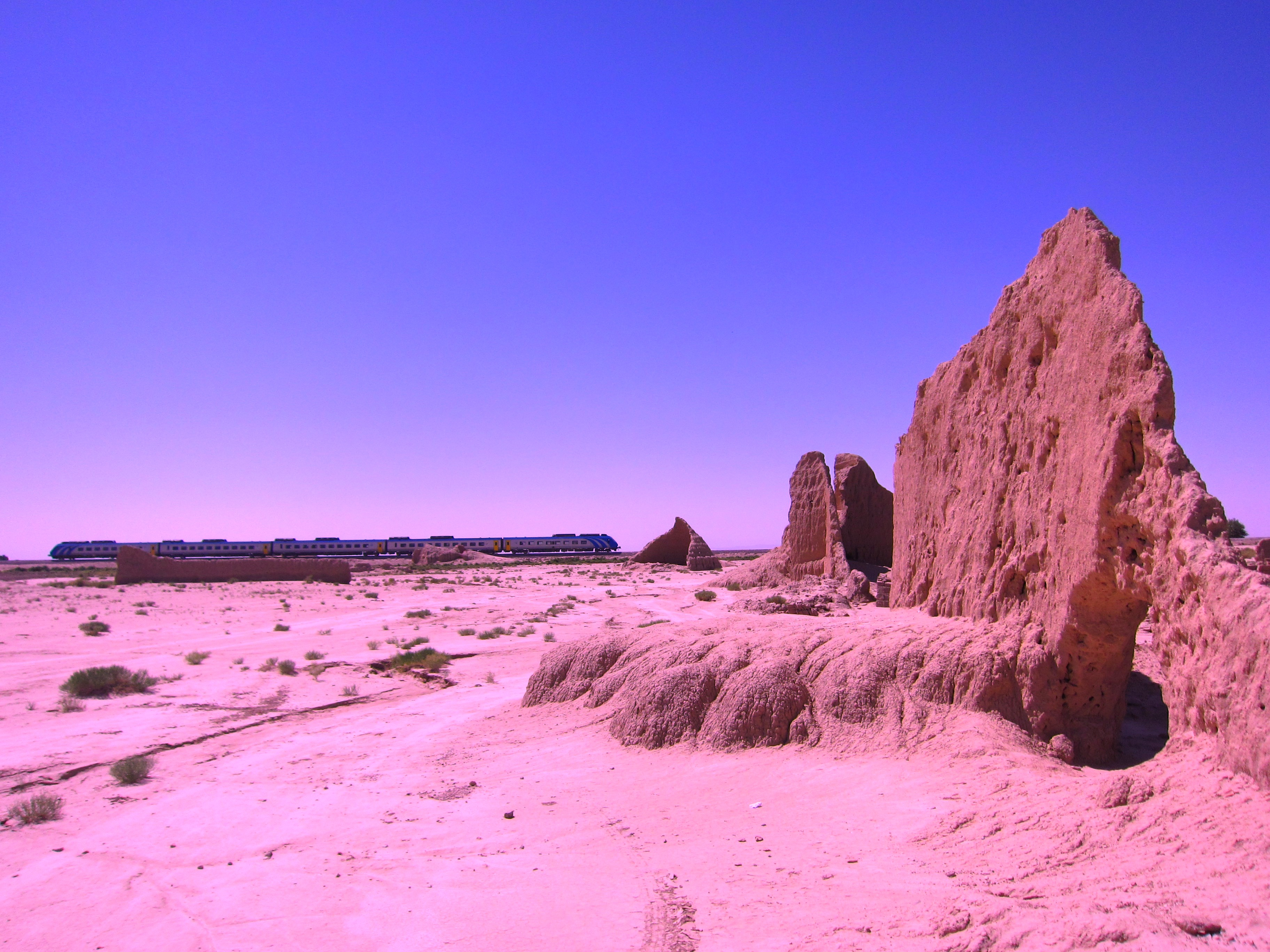

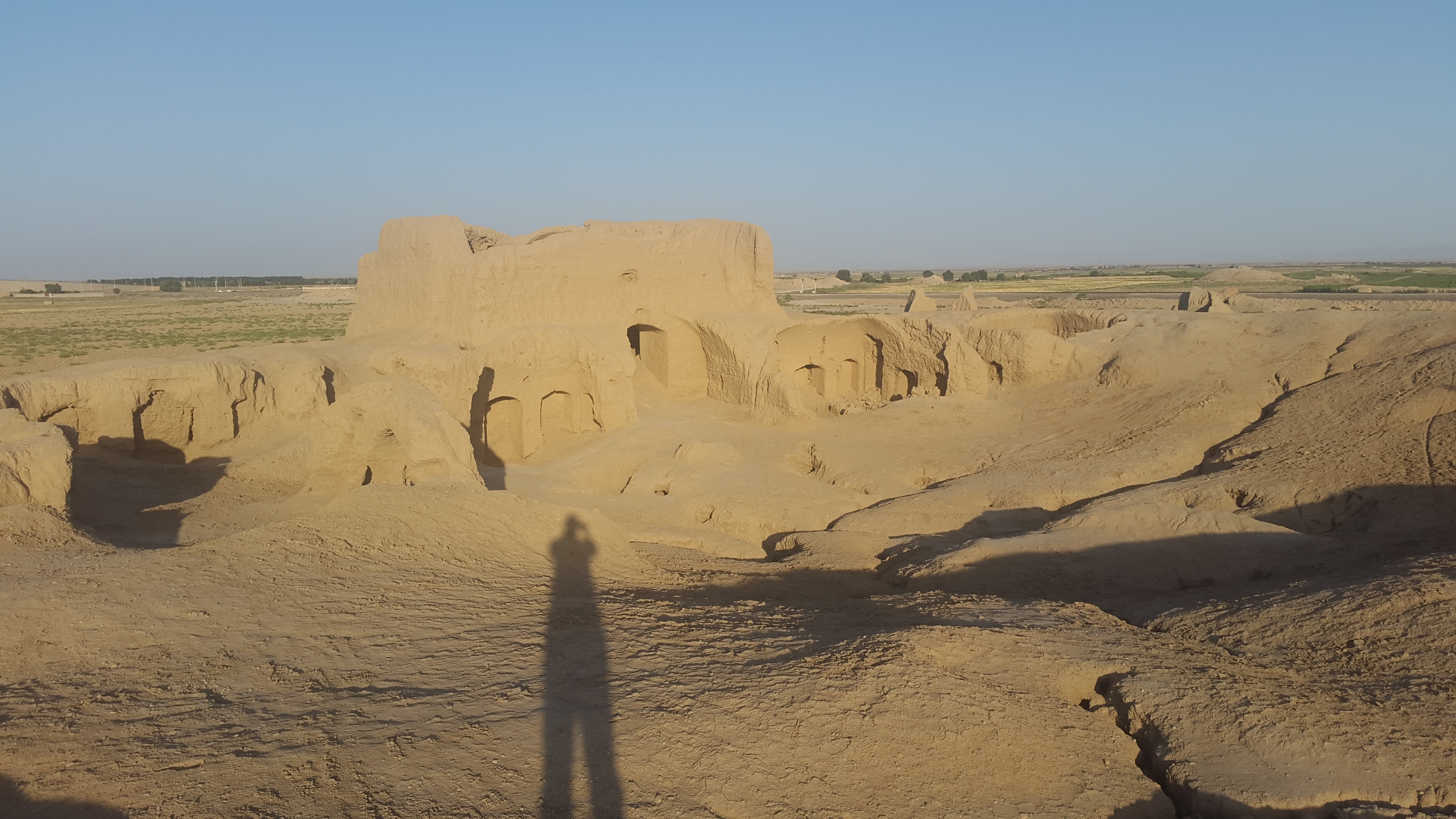

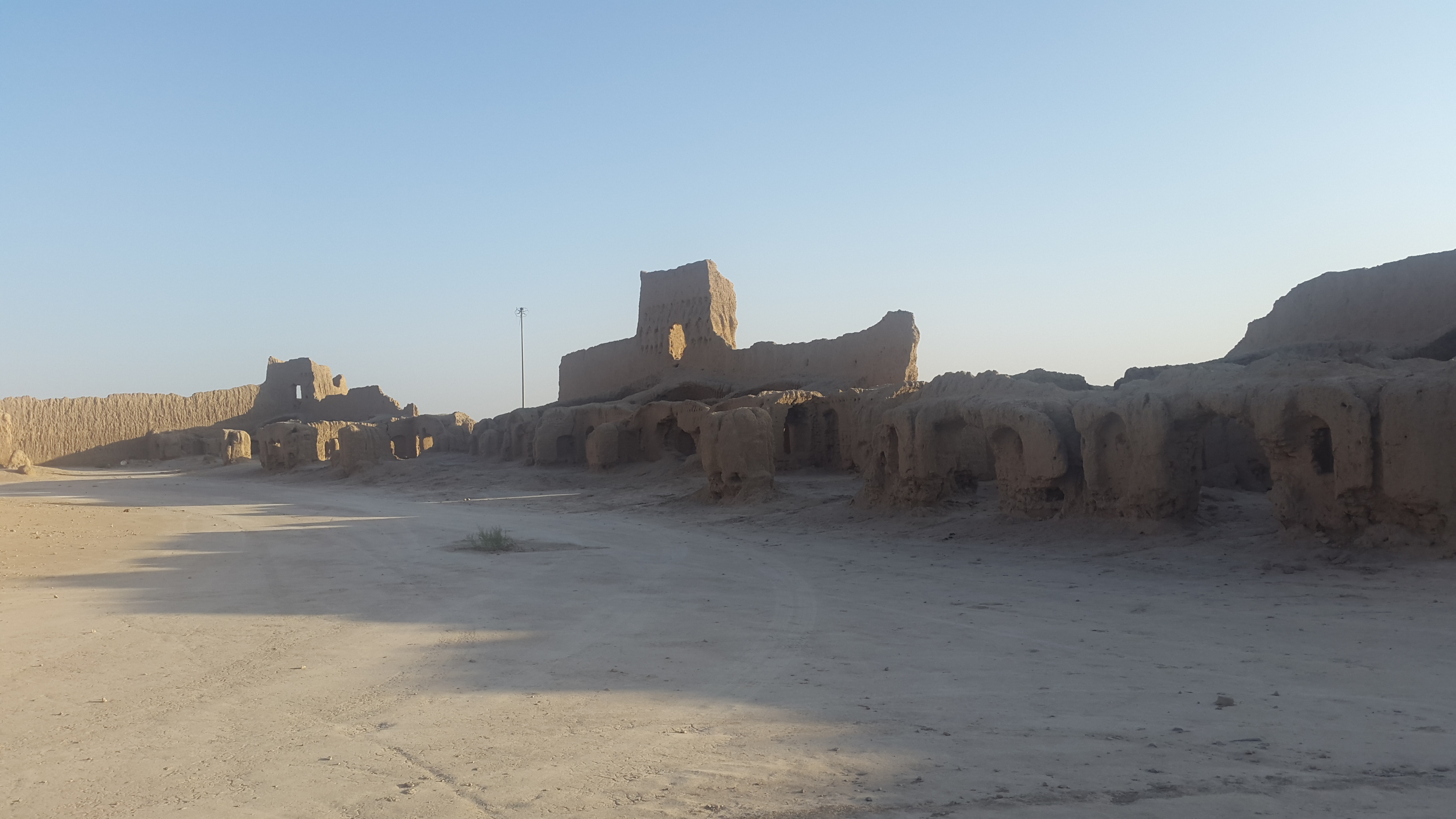

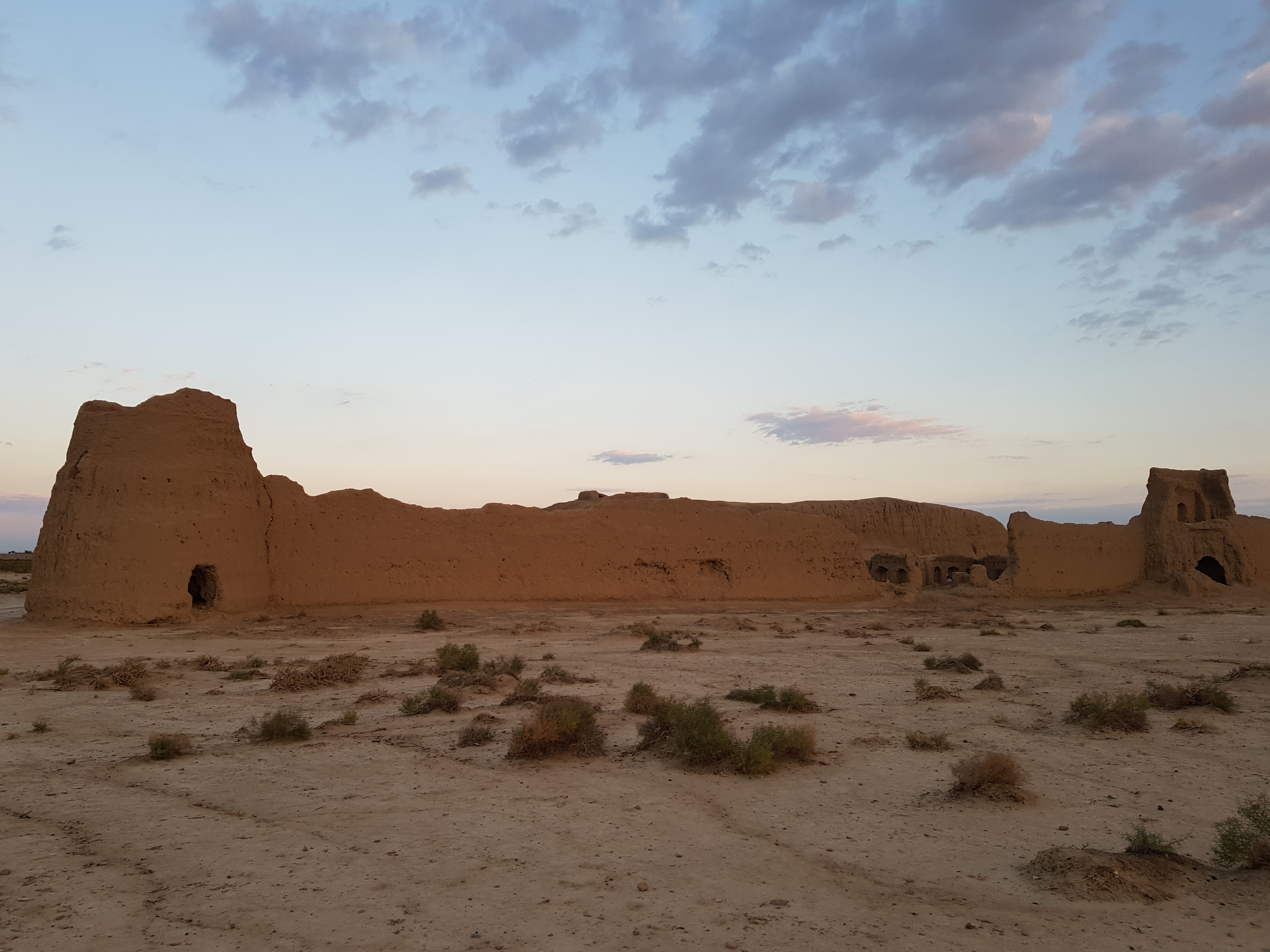

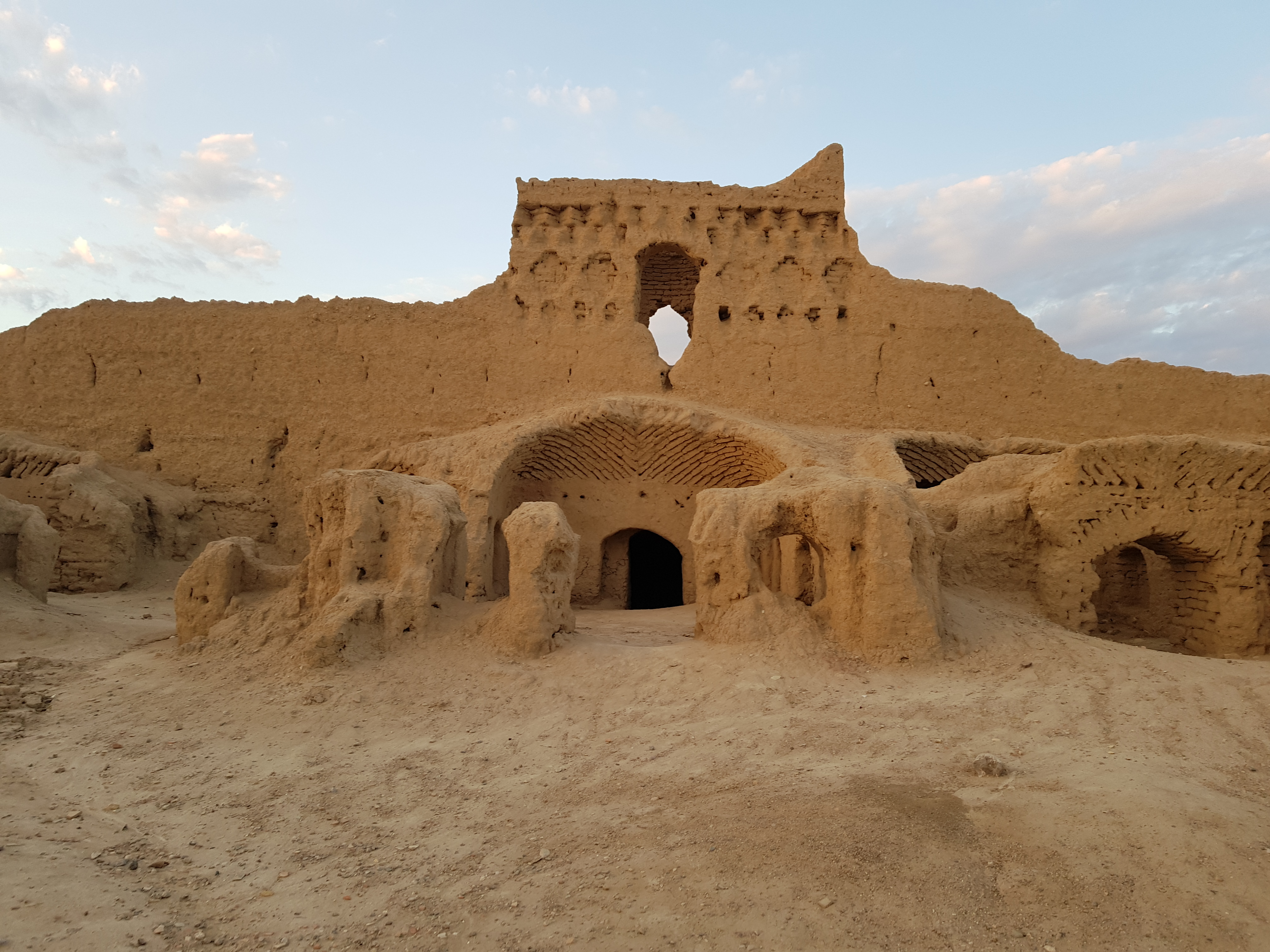

== See also ==
- Tepe Ghabristan
- List of cities of the ancient Near East
- Tureng Tepe
- Tepe Sialk
