= Shir Ashian =

Shir Ashian شيراشيان
- Village
- Location within Iran
- Coordinates: 36°05′26″N 54°11′29″E
- Country: Iran
- Province: Semnan
- County: Damghan
- Bakhsh: Amirabad
- Rural District: Qohab-e Sarsar

Population (2006)
  - Total: 20
- Time zone: UTC+3:30 (IRST)
  - Summer (DST): UTC+4:30 (IRDT)

Shir Ashian (Persian: شيراشيان, also Romanized as Shīr Āshīān, Shīr Āsheyān, and Shīr Āshīyān) is a village in Qohab-e Sarsar Rural District, Amirabad District, Damghan County, Semnan Province, Iran. At the 2006 census, its population was 20, in 8 families.

Archaeological site Shir Ashian Tepe is located nearby.
