= Qaleh Kharabeh, Gorgan =

Fort and archaeological site in Golestan Province, Iran

Coordinates: 37.10246292°N 54.42645418°E

Qaleh Kharabeh (Persian: قلعه خرابه, also Romanized as Qal‘eh Kharābeh) is the archaeological site of a 5th-century fort in the Gorgan Plain, in Golestan Province in northeastern Iran. It lies one mile to the south of the Great Wall of Gorgan, which was a fortification built between the Caspian Sea and the Kopet Dag Mountains between 420 AD and 530s AD by the Sasanian Empire, on the northern edge of their empire. The fort may have served as a barracks for soldiers defending the wall or may have been used by civilians, but its neat layout suggest it had a military origin.

A magnetometer survey of Qaleh Kharabeh was made in 2007 and 2008. The fort had a formal and precise, military-style layout. A central crossroads was found with evidence of buildings on either sides of the roads, these being more easily discernable near the crossroads. Nearby these were pits and places where fire pits may have been located. On the eastern side of the fort were rows of what appeared to be small enclosures; perhaps these were where gullies had been dug surrounding tents or other temporary buildings. Other parts of the site had no discernible structures, apart from the remnants of the field divisions that pre-dated the fort. Pottery found during excavations indicates that the fort was occupied for a relatively short period, during the earlier part of the wall's history. The diet of the occupants included fish, presumably transported from the Caspian Sea which lies 45 km (28 mi) to the west.

Qaleh Kharabeh is one of several forts to be found in the plain south of the Great Wall. This hinterland south of the wall probably receives sufficient natural precipitation for rain-fed agriculture to take place, and the canals which are a feature of the area were built, not for irrigation purposes, but to supply the needs of the military garrison and for the brick kilns that were used to manufacture the bricks of which the walls and the forts were built. It is thought that Qaleh Kharabeh was used to garrison the troops stationed on the wall. The pottery fragments found at the fort and other sites associated with the wall are giving researchers a clearer picture of the sequence of events associated with the wall and the settlements in the area.

== See also ==
- Iraj Citadel
