= Yarim Tepe (Iran) =

Neolithic settlement in Iran

- یاریم‌تپه (Persian)
- Location within Near East Location within Iran
- 37.148°N 55.2004°E
- Type: Settlement
- Location: Gorgan Plain, Golestan province, Iran

Site notes
- Condition: In ruins

Yarim Tepe (Persian: یاریم‌تپه) is a Neolithic settlement in the eastern Gorgan Plain, Golestan province, Iran. It is located near Gonbad-e Kavus. This ancient settlement played a big role in establishing the cultural chronology of the Neolithic period in Central Asia.

== History of research ==
It was first explored by V. E. Crawford in 1963, when very little was still known about the Neolithic age settlements in this area. There are many cultural similarities between Yarim and the nearby site of Tureng Tepe of the same age.

Just like at Tureng Tepe, in the earliest horizon, there occur Jeitun-like ceramics, that are found mostly in the Kopet Dag mountains area, but also at several other contemporary sites in the Gorgan plain, for example in the Hotu cave, and even further west near Behshahr.

In Period I at Yarim Tepe, the Jeitun ware was identified as “Yarim Neolithic”.

== Chronology ==
The early stage of Yarim I is generally dated c. 5200 BC. In southern Turkmenistan, this is also known as ‘Pessejik period’. In northeastern Iran, along with Yarim I, to this period also belong Hotu cave, and Tureng 'IA'. In North-central Iran, this period is known as ‘Transitional Chalcolithic’, and it is parallel to Sialk II stratum.

At Yarim Tepe there is a gap between the Djeitun-ware levels and the overlying gray-ware levels (Yarim II).

== See also ==
- Sang-i Chakmak
- Prehistory of Iran

== Bibliography ==
- D. Stronach, “Yarim Tepe,” in Excavations in Iran. The British Contribution, Oxford, 1972, pp. 21–23.
- Robert H. Dyson, CERAMICS: The Neolithic Period through the Bronze Age in Northeastern and North-central Persia. iranicaonline.org
- Hiebert F.T., The Kopet Dag Sequence of Early Villages in Central Asia. Paléorient, 2002 Vol 28 #2 pp. 25–41
