= Sang-i Chakmak =

Neolithic archaeological site in Iran

- سنگ چخماق (Persian)
- Tappeh Sang-e Chakhmaq, Sange Chaxmaq, Chakhmagh
- Location within Near East Location within Iran
- 36°29′59″N 55°00′02″E
- Type: Neolithic archaeological site
- Location: Iran
- Region: Semnan province

Site notes
- Excavation dates: 1969
- Archaeologists: Seiichi Masuda

Sang-i Chakmak (Tappeh Sang-e Chakhmaq, Sange Chaxmaq, Chakhmagh) is a Neolithic archaeological site located about 1 km (0.62 mi) north of the village of Bastam in the northern Semnan province of Iran, on the southeastern flank of the Alborz mountains. The site represents quite well the transition from the aceramic Neolithic phase in the general area; this was taking place during the 7th millennium BC.

== Excavations ==
The site was discovered in 1969 by Seiichi Masuda. It includes several settlement mounds, of which two were excavated in 1971–1977 by a team from the Tokyo University of Education (now the University of Tsukuba)

Another related site is Deh Kheyr, located only 4 km (2.5 mi) from Sang-i Chakmak.

== Western settlement ==
The western settlement is an approximately 3 m high mound with a diameter of about 80 m, and contains five cultural layers.

Levels 2-5 represent the aceramic Neolithic phase. There's also some imported obsidian. There are many zoomorphic and anthropomorphic figurines.

Large mud-brick houses with plastered floors were built. Some of them are made of lime plaster. The buildings were rectangular and consisted of rooms with dimensions of 6x4 m. Two different types of buildings are found. Some had a square hearth on the north side and partly blackened walls; others had no hearth and the rooms were comparatively small, but with carefully designed floors. In one of these small rooms without hearth in layer II some highly stylized clay figurines were found.

In addition, the excavations found small bone fibulae and bone needles, flint cuttings, microliths and cores and blades of obsidian. It is noteworthy that only three pottery shards were found. Two come from the surface and one from layer III, of which 300 m^{2} are excavated. In the work of Akira Tsuneki, only four shards are shown.

== Eastern settlement ==
The eastern settlement is located about 150 m from the west and has an extension of 100 m in the north–south direction and 150 m in east–west direction. Layers VI-III contained multi-dimensional rectangular dwellings with outbuildings, often with a small work area and an oven. The buildings have different sizes, have an average size of 5 x 8 meters and have an entrance hall or courtyard. They are made of clay blocks of 70 by 20 cm, in the same technique as the Jeitun culture in Turkmenistan.

Unlike the western settlement, no carefully executed floors were observed in the east. Characteristic is the use of cigar-shaped mud bricks. In layer III many kilns have been discovered.

In the uppermost layers II and I, the building plans differ from the above-described lower ones. The rooms are square with a hearth on the northern side. In addition, the main rooms are not divided into smaller areas, instead small rectangular rooms have been added.

In the top layer were three tombs containing the burials of women and children. A skull of a young woman was also found; it was covered with a decorated pot of a type known from the site of Tepe Sialk.

In contrast to the western settlement, a large amount of pottery has been found in the eastern one. Most of the decorated pottery displays geometric patterns such as crossed lines, and the horizontal and vertical parallel lines drawn in red or dark brown against a creamy or reddish background. The ceramics of the upper, younger layers show animal motifs. There are also conical clay objects, spindles, animal statuettes made of clay or stone, bone needles, polished stone axes, flint cuttings and microliths. Particularly interesting are wooden sickle handles with animal motifs from layers IV and V.

The objects found generally show similarities to the lowest layer of Yarim Tepe and, above all, to the Jeitun culture.

Cheshmeh-Ali ware appears here around 5000 BC, like in so many other northeastern Iranian sites. This seems to have created some cultural discontinuity. Also, around 4500, Anau IA ware appears at the site, with simpler geometric and linear designs, and less finely made ceramics.

== Cultural sequence ==
The uppermost layer I of the western settlement is older than the lowest layer VI of the eastern settlement. The small amount of pottery shards at the western hill, in contrast to the large amount at the east, indicates a higher age of the western settlement. Thus the site represents a transitional cultural period to the ceramic phase.

These indications have been confirmed by the studies of Toshio Nakamura from the Center for Chronological Research of Nagoya University in 2014. In his study, 40 samples of charcoal taken during the 1970s excavations were tested using the AMS method. Of the 40 samples, 37 were usable. For the western settlement an occupancy period of 7200 to 6600 cal BC has been shown. For the eastern, the occupation period of 6300 to 5200 cal BC is indicated. There seems to be a hiatus of c. 300 years between the two settlements.

== See also ==
- Prehistory of Iran

== Literature ==
- Akira Tsuneki, The site of Tappeh Sang-e Chakhmaq. In: The First Farming Village in Northeast Iran and Turan: Tappeh Sang-e Chakhmaq and Beyond. Symposium held on 10–11 February 2014, Tsukuba 2014, p. 5–8
- Akira Tsuneki, Pottery and Other Objects from Tappeh Sang-e Chakhmaq. In: The First Farming Village in Northeast Iran and Turan: Tappeh Sang-e Chakhmaq and Beyond. Symposium held on 10–11 February 2014, Tsukuba 2014, p. 13–18
