= Marcel-Auguste Dieulafoy =

French archaeologist

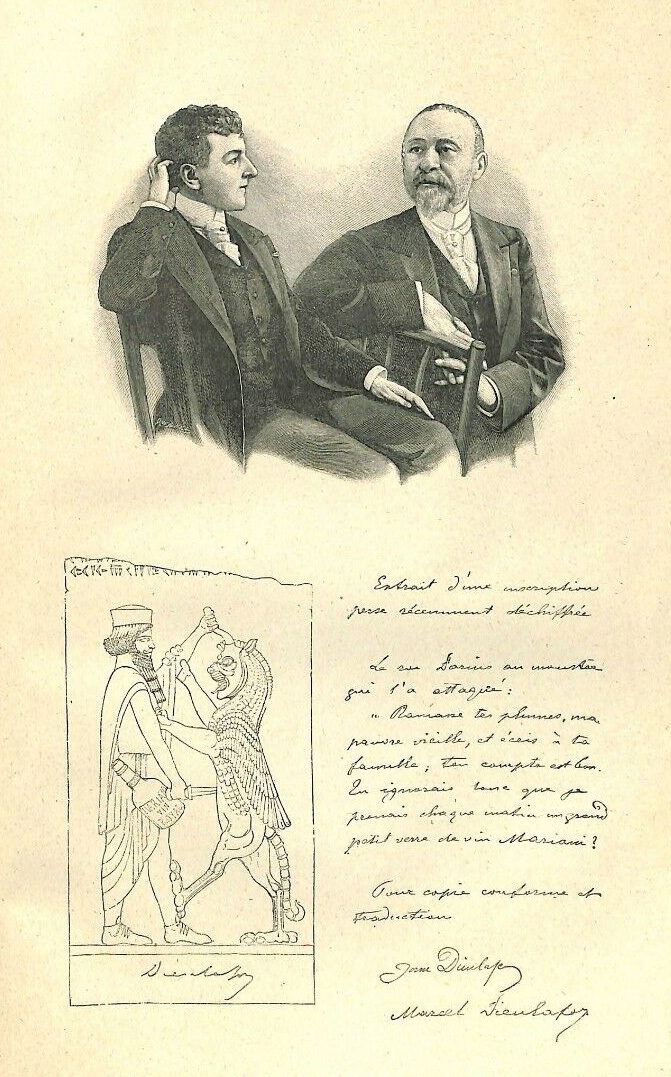
- Marcel Dieulafoy, with his wife, Jane (left, in male dress).
- Born: 3 August 1844; Toulouse
- Died: 25 February 1920 (aged 75); Paris
- Education: Ecole Polytechnique
- Known for: excavations at Susa
- Scientific career
- Fields: archaeology, civil engineering

Marcel-Auguste Dieulafoy (French: [maʁsɛl oɡyst djølafwa]; 3 August 1844 – 25 February 1920) was a French archaeologist, noted for his excavations at Susa (modern-day Shush, Iran) in 1885 and for his work, L'Art antique de la Perse.

== Early life ==
Marcel-Auguste Dieulafoy was born in Toulouse into an educated and ennobled family. In 1863, Dieulafoy entered the École Polytechnique where he studied civil engineering. Upon graduating, he joined France's Bureau of roads and bridges, taking up a position in Sour al-Ghozlane (then called Aumale) in Algeria. In 1870, he returned to France, assuming a post in the navigation services on the Garonne. That same year he married Jane Magre (1851-1916), who was also from Toulouse. He was an engineering officer in the French Army during the Franco-Prussian War (1870–71), posted to Nevers. Upon demobilisation, he became first the head of the supply services for the Department of the Haute Garonne and subsequently, in 1874, of municipal services for his native city of Toulouse.

As a result, both of a cultivated family environment and his time spent in Algeria, Dieulafoy had long had an interest in medieval and Roman archaeology. As a result, he became acquainted with Eugène Viollet-le-Duc, under whose direction he worked for four years in the Commission of Historic Monuments. With Viollet-le-Duc's encouragement, Dieulafoy decided to pursue this interest at a professional level. In 1880, he resigned his post in Toulouse and requested a government assignment in Iran.

== The Susa excavations ==
Arriving quite ill in Tehran via Athens and Constantinople (Istanbul), he was attended to by a French doctor François Tholozan. Shortly thereafter they embarked upon an expedition to Susa, where Dieulafoy and his wife explored the remains of the palace first uncovered by William Loftus some thirty years previously. During this visit, the Dieulafoys took numerous photographs and made copious notes. His wife, Jane, took on as close to a male appearance as she could during their sojourn in Iran.

This brief journey to Susa made a lasting impression on Dieulafoy. Upon his return to France, he started to organise the publication of the first volume of his magnum opus, L'Art antique de la Perse, the first volume of which appeared in 1884. That year he obtained a grant from the newly founded Department of Antiquities at the Louvre and from the Ministère de l'Instruction publique as well as logistical support from the French army and navy in order to fund further study. The Dieulafoys returned to Iran in 1884, accompanied by a young engineer, Charles Babin and by the naturalist Frédéric Houssay. It was Tholozan, then official physician to the Qajar court, who intervened on Dieulafoy's behalf with the Persian authorities to obtain permission to explore Susa further, with the proviso that the Tomb of Daniel not be disturbed. Further, agreement was reached which allowed any discoveries made at the site, except for those of precious metals, to be split equally between the French and Persian governments. Work took place between the winters of 1885 and 1886.

The excavations took place under arduous conditions. The team lived in tents and were exposed to the harshness of the elements. There was little government control in the region, meaning that roving bands of thieves operated quite freely. Nonetheless, Dieulafoy's expedition succeeded in discovering numerous objects, most of which ended up in the Louvre Museum since the Persian government, uninterested in the largely brick and stone mortar fragments that were unearthed, waived its right to share in the discoveries. None of the pieces that were not shipped to France survived.

These "museum pieces", however, were of secondary importance to Dieulafoy, whose primary interest remained the architecture of the site. He succeeded in partially excavating the great central columned hall (the Apadana), originally identified by Loftus as having been originally built by Darius and then restored by Artaxerxes II.

== Later life ==
After publishing the results of his mission, Dieulafoy lost interest in Iran. He returned to the French civil service, taking a position in the administration of the national rail system and devoted himself to biblical studies. He was elected to the Académie des Inscriptions et Belles-Lettres in 1895 and started to research the history of French architecture and the early sculpture of Spain and Portugal.

At the outbreak of World War One, Dieulafoy wanted to return to military service, despite being 70. He was sent to Rabat as a lieutenant colonel in the Engineering corps, where he supervised the excavation of a local mosque. In 1919, he published his last work on the theme of Daniel and Balthazar.

He died the following year after a brief illness.

== L'Art antique de la Perse ==
Dieulafoy is still remembered for his work, L'Art antique de la Perse, which was published in five volumes, folio between 1884 and 1889. His wife, Jane, took many photographs of local sites, especially at Ctesiphon, Pasargadae, Persepolis and Susa. The fine quality of these images, many of sites that have subsequently been destroyed, damaged, or badly restored, means the work remains an invaluable scholarly resource.
