= Great Wall of Gorgan =

Ancient defensive wall in Iran

- Near Gorgan in Iran
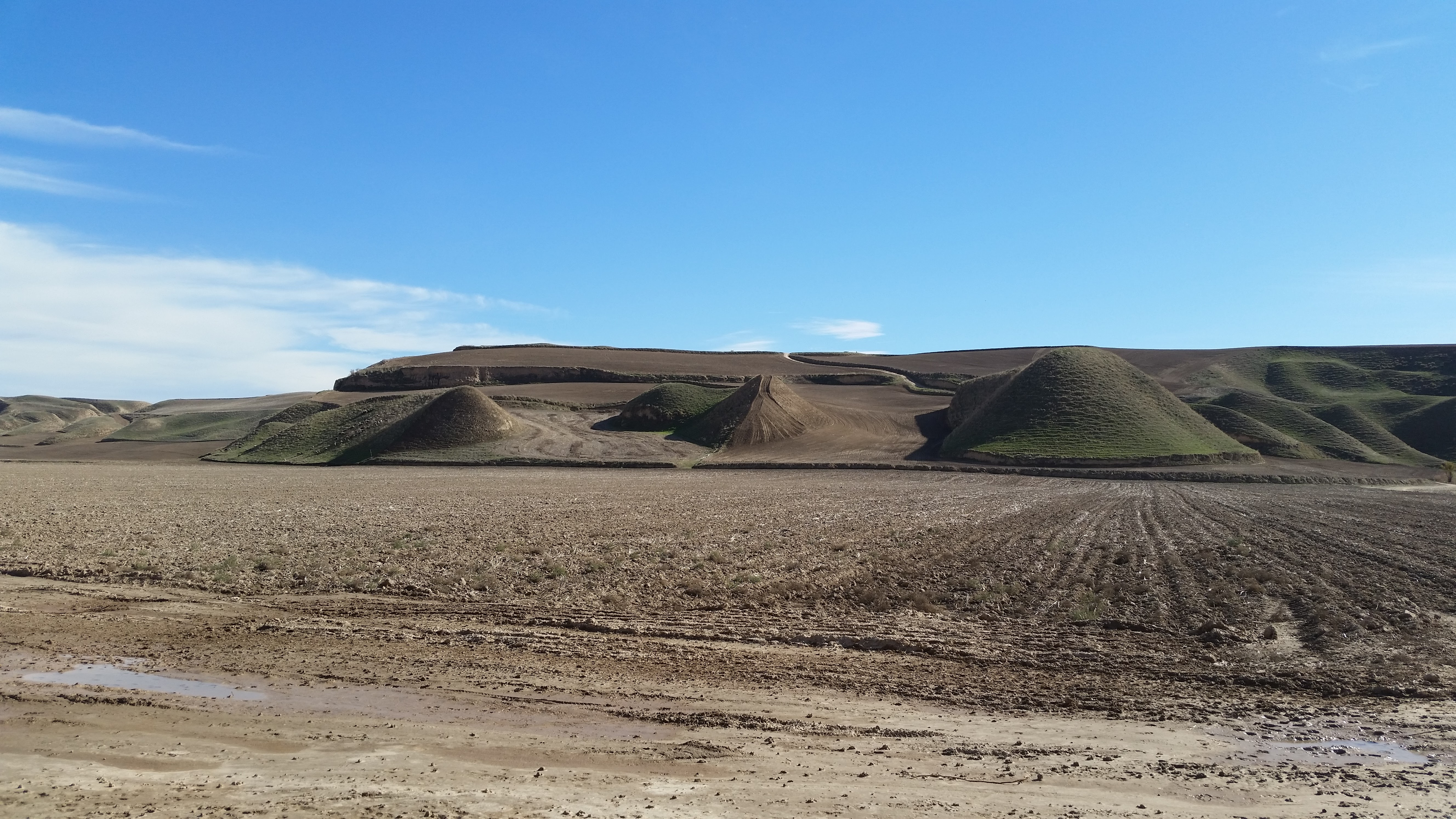
- The Great Wall of Gorgan

Site information
- Type: Series of ancient defensive fortifications

Location
- Coordinates: 37°15′38″N 55°00′37″E; 37.13981°N 54.1788733°E; 37.5206739°N 55.5770498°E
- Length: 200 km

Site history
- Built: 5th or 6th century
- Materials: Mudbrick; fired brick; gypsum; mortar

The Great Wall of Gorgan is a Sasanian-era defense system located near modern Gorgan in the Golestān Province of northeastern Iran, at the southeastern corner of the Caspian Sea.

The wall is located at a geographic narrowing between the Caspian Sea and the mountains of northeastern Iran. It is one of several Caspian Gates at the eastern part of a region known in antiquity as Hyrcania, on the nomadic route from the Eurasian Steppe to the Iranian heartland. The wall is believed to have protected the Sasanian Empire to the south from the foreign peoples of the north, probably the White Huns. The wall is described as "amongst the most ambitious and sophisticated frontier walls" ever built in the world and the most important of the Sasanian defense fortifications.

It is 195 km (121 mi) long and 6–10 m (20–33 ft) wide and features over 30 fortresses spaced at intervals of between 10 and 50 km (6.2 and 31.1 mi). It is surpassed only by the wall systems of the Great Wall of China and Cheolli Jangseong (in modern-day North Korea) as the longest single-segment building and the longest defensive wall in existence.

== Names ==
Among archaeologists, the wall is also known as "the Red Snake" (Turkmen: Qizil Alan), due to the colour of its bricks. In Persian, it was known as "Alexander's Barrier" (سد اسکندر Sadd-i-Iskandar) or "Alexander's Wall", as Alexander the Great is thought by early Muslims to have passed through the Caspian Gates on his hasty march to Hyrcania and the east. It is also known as "Anushirvân's Barrier" (سد انوشیروان Sadd-i Anushiravan) and "Firuz/Piruz's Barrier" (سد پیروز) and is officially referred to as the "Gorgan Defence Wall" (دیوار دفاعی گرگان). It is also referred to as Qizil Yilan (Turkic title).

== Description ==
The barrier consists of a wall 195 km (121 mi) long and 6–10 m (20–33 ft) wide, with over 30 fortresses at intervals of between 10 and 50 km (6.2 and 31.1 mi).

The building materials consist of mudbrick, fired brick, gypsum, and mortar. Clay was also used during the early Parthian era. Mudbricks were more popular in the early period in the construction of forts and cities, while fired bricks became common in the later period. Sometimes, one brick was set in the vertical position, with two horizontal rows laid above and below. The sizes of mud- or fired bricks differ, but in general, the standard size was 40 × 40 × 10 cm. The fired bricks were made from the local loess soil and fired in kilns along the line of the wall.

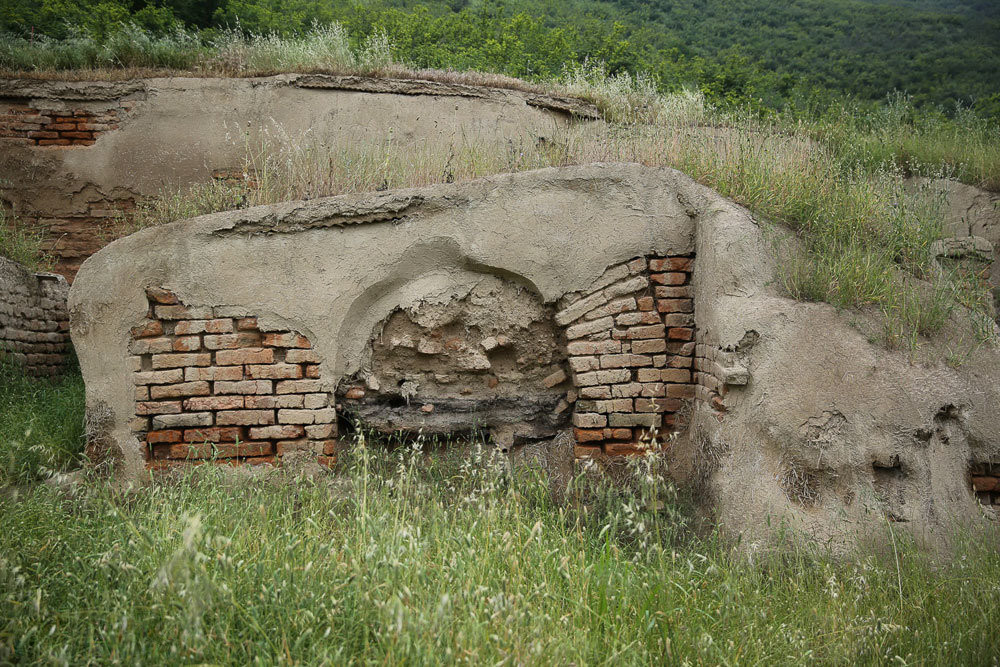
A section of the Great Wall of Gorgan

The wall starts from the Caspian coast, circles north of Gonbad-e Kavus (ancient Gorgan, or Jorjan in Arabic), continues towards the northeast, and vanishes in the Pishkamar Mountains. It lies slightly north of a local river and features a 5 m (16 ft) ditch that conducted water along most of the wall.

In 1999, a logistical archaeological survey was conducted on the wall due to problems in development projects, especially during construction of the Golestan Dam, which irrigates all the areas covered by the wall. At the point of the connection of the wall and the drainage canal from the dam, architects discovered the remains of the Great Wall of Gorgan. The 40 identified fortresses vary in dimension and shape, but the majority are square fortresses, made of the same brickwork as the wall itself and during the same period. Due to many difficulties in development and agricultural projects, archaeologists have been assigned to mark the boundary of the historical find by laying cement blocks.

Larger than Hadrian's Wall and the Antonine Wall combined (two separate structures in Britain that marked the northern limits of the Roman Empire), it has been called the greatest monument of its kind between Europe and China. The wall is third only to the walls that make up the Great Wall of China and the Cheolli Jangseong (in modern-day North Korea) as the longest defensive wall in existence, and although now in substantial disrepair, it was perhaps even more solidly built than the early forms of the Great Wall.

== Route ==
The route, from east to west, is represented by the coordinates of the remains of the following forts and other features that lie along the wall. The coordinates and fort numbers, etc., are sourced from Wikimapia:

East end of wall

Location	Coordinates
fort (1)	37.5206739°N 55.5770498°E
fort (2)	37.5008423°N 55.5210721°E
fort (3?)	37.4747559°N 55.4633295°E
fort (4)	37.4519502°N 55.4202157°E
bend	37.4339426°N 55.3920364°E
bend	37.4294784°N 55.3828955°E
bend	37.4287627°N 55.3755999°E
fort (5)	37.4270545°N 55.3724777°E
bend	37.4187427°N 55.3549147°E
fort (6)	37.3991674°N 55.3339988°E
fort (7)	37.3779074°N 55.3097141°E
fort (8)	37.345827°N 55.2734506°E
fort (9)	37.3072092°N 55.2290708°E
bend	37.2880529°N 55.2055693°E
fort (10)	37.2808739°N 55.1753488°E
fort (12)	37.2669322°N 55.1104903°E
bend	37.2619287°N 55.0805569°E
fort (14)	37.2604343°N 55.010165°E
fort (15)	37.2606563°N 54.9755966°E
fort (17)	37.2594096°N 54.9330085°E
fort (18)	37.2558914°N 54.8976731°E
fort (20)	37.2494609°N 54.8232901°E
fort (22)	37.2176589°N 54.695853°E
fort	37.1398186°N 54.6595144°E
fort (25)	37.1181987°N 54.5549244°E
fort (26)	37.115538°N 54.5270026°E
fort (27)	37.1176298°N 54.5025676°E
Qaleh Kharabeh fortress (c 1 mile south of Wall)	37.1024599°N 54.4261944°E
fort (30)	37.13786°N 54.3265128°E
fort (33)	37.13981°N 54.1788733°E

West end of wall

== Dating ==
Dating the wall is difficult, in part because no sources from classical antiquity mention it: "No ancient textual source refers to the wall, no inscription, and no coin has ever been found on it".

The archeologist M. Y. Kiani, who led the research team in 1971, believed that the wall was built during the Parthian Empire (247 BC–224 AD) and that it was reconstructed and restored during the Sassanid era (3rd–7th century AD). In 2005, a team excavated samples of charcoal from the many brick kilns along the wall, and samples from the Gorgan Wall and the smaller Wall of Tammishe. OSL and radiocarbon dating indicated a date for both walls in the late 5th or 6th century AD. These dates suggest that the current wall, at least, is Sassanid rather than Parthian, and that the current structure did not yet exist some 800 years earlier, in the time of Alexander the Great (died 323 BC). If Alexander encountered a barrier at this location it was a predecessor of the current wall.

If we assumed that the forts were occupied as densely as those on Hadrian's Wall, then the garrison on the Gorgan Wall would have been in the order of 30,000 men. Models, taking into account the size and room number of the barrack blocks in the Gorgan Wall forts and likely occupation density, produce figures between 15,000 and 36,000 soldiers. Even the lowest estimate suggests a strong and powerful army, all the more remarkable as our investigations focused just on 200km of vulnerable frontier, a small fraction of the thousands of kilometres of borders of one of the ancient world's largest empires.

The historian Kaveh Farrokh, also concurring the wall was originally built during the time of the Parthian Empire, notes that it was constructed around the same time as the Great Wall of China. During the Sassanid era, the wall was developed into a fluid and advanced system of defense that allowed Sassanian Persia to defeat the menacing Hephthalite invasions of the 6–7th centuries AD.

== Derbent Caspian Gate ==
A similar Sasanian defence wall and fortification lies on the opposite, western, side of the Caspian Sea at the port of Derbent, in the Russian Republic of Dagestan. There, the remains of a line of fortifications run inland for some 3 km (1.9 mi) from the shore of the Caspian Sea (42.062643°N 48.307185°E) to what is today the extraordinarily well-preserved fort of Naryn-Kala (42.052840°N 48.274230°E) in the first foothills of the Caucasus Mountains.

== See also ==
- Gates of Alexander
- Iranian architecture
