= Oxus (god) =

Ancient Iranian river god

- Divine representation of the Amu Darya, king of the gods
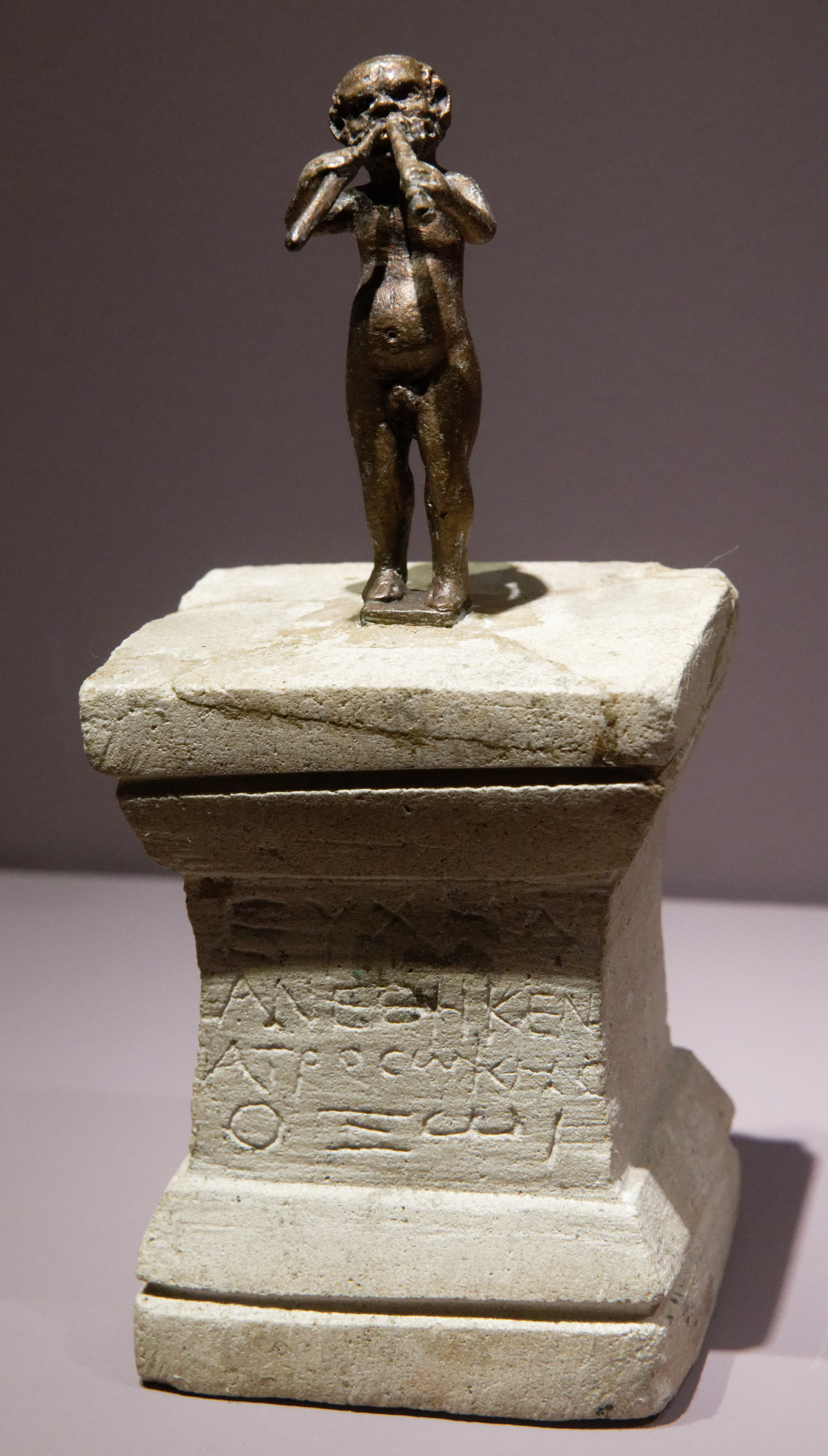
- Altar from Takht-i Sangin with a statuette of Oxus, depicted in the form of Marsyas.
- Major cult center: Takht-i Sangin
- Animals: horse (disputed)
- Adherents: Bactrians, Sogdians, Chorasmians

Equivalents
- Greek: Marsyas

Oxus (Vaxš, Oaxšo) was an ancient Eastern Iranian god regarded as the divine representation of the Amu Darya. In Bactria he was also considered the king of the gods. Multiple different depictions of him are known from ancient Central Asian art. On an altar from his temple discovered in Takht-i Sangin he is depicted in the form of the Greek river god Marsyas presumably introduced by soldiers and settlers who arrived in this area during the reigns of Alexander the Great and the Seleucids. In Kushan art he was instead depicted as a Poseidon-like figure holding a staff and a fish. In Sogdian art he might have been depicted either as a horse or as a figure seated on a throne with horse protomes, though this proposal remains a matter of debate.

The earliest evidence for the worship of Oxus comes from Bactria from the Achaemenid period. He remained a popular deity in this area up to the Muslim conquest of Transoxiana. He was also worshiped in nearby Sogdia and Chorasmia. According to Al-Biruni he was still venerated in the last of these areas in the tenth century.

== Name and character ==
It is presumed that Oxus' name is derived from the Iranian root *waxš-, "grow, leap". The romanized form Oxus reflects the Greek form of the name (Ὸξωι), while in Bactrian the god was known as Vaxš. (Note: Also romanized without the diacritic as Vaksh.) On a unique coin of the Kushan king Huvishka, the form Oaxšo (OAXϷO) has been identified.

Oxus was considered the divine representation of the river he shared his name with, the modern Amu Darya. (Note: The modern hydronym Vakhsh, one of its tributaries, is derived from its ancient name.) It has been suggested that he was additionally associated with the entire hydrographic system of the areas he was worshiped in, including lakes, canals and rain clouds.

In Bactria Oxus was regarded as the main deity of the local pantheon, or at least as one of its most important members. He could be referred to as "the lord of the world" (also translated as "the one god") or "the king of the gods", though the latter title was also applied to Mithra and the poorly known deity Kamird, which might indicate that multiple local traditions focused on devotion to specific gods existed in individual regions or cities in Bactria, similarly as in Sogdia. The high status of Oxus among Eastern Iranian peoples in Central Asia according to Michael Shenkar might explain why Anahita, who was also associated with water, never reached a comparable importance in this region as she did in the west, despite being introduced to Bactria by the Sassanian dynasty. Henri-Paul Francfort also voiced support for the view that the high status of Oxus might be responsible for the scarcity of references to Anahita in the east.

=== Disputed proposals ===
Identification between Oxus and the deity Zūn has been proposed. However, based on a legend about the latter recorded by the Chinese pilgrim Xuanzang, in which he is described as a mountain deity who "arrived from afar", it has been alternatively suggested that he was an alternate name of Mithra rather than Oxus, as he is linked with Mount Harā in the Avesta.

Henri-Paul Francfort has suggested that Oxus was a female deity at various point in time identified with Cybele, Artemis and Aphrodite. Furthermore, he derives the Kushan theonym Ardoksho from Oxus' name. This proposal has been criticized as baseless by Michael Shenkar, who points out the only certain depictions of Oxus indicate he was regarded as a male deity, and that based on Kushan sources Ardoksho was a distinct deity from him. Her name is typically interpreted as "the good Ashi", rather than as "the righteous Oxus", as suggested by Francfort.

While Mary Boyce and Frantz Grenet described Oxus as a yazata in the 1990s, more recently other authors, including Michael Shenkar and Sun Wujun have characterized him as a deity who despite his Iranian origin did not belong to Zoroastrian tradition. This view has been adopted by Grenet himself as well.

== Iconography ==
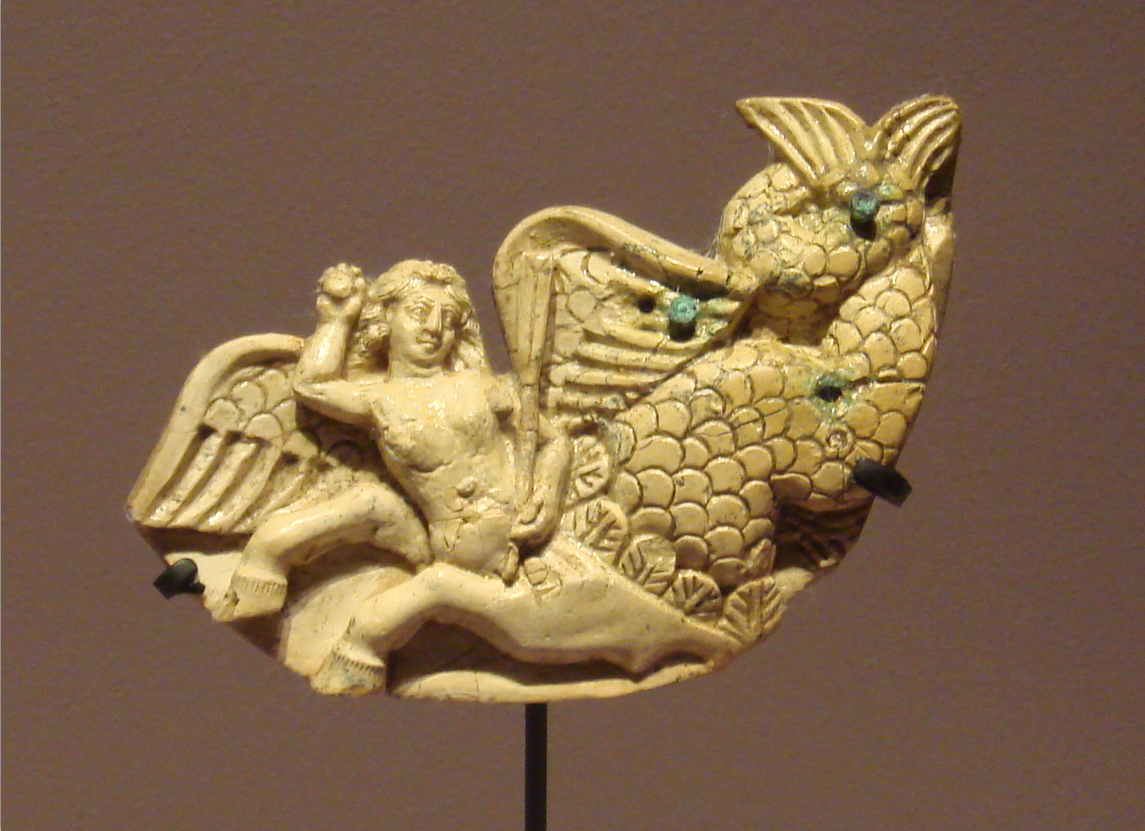
The ichtyocentaur-like figure from Takht-i Sangin.

The iconography of Oxus was not consistent across different time periods. The earliest known representation of this god is a statuette from a temple dedicated to him excavated in Takht-i Sangin in Tajikistan, which depicts him in the form of Greek Marsyas. Most likely Oxus was originally identified as a counterpart of Marsyas by Ionian Greeks who arrived in Central Asia as members of Alexander the Great's armies partaking in his Indian campaign. It has also been noted that many settlers from Magnesia, where Marsyas was popular as a river deity due to his association with a namesake tributary of Maeander, arrived in the east in Seleucid times. The identification between the two river gods was presumably accepted by the population of the Greco-Bactrian Kingdom. It has additionally been suggested that Hellenistic depictions of an ichtyocentaur-like hybrid nymph from the Takht-i Sangin might represent a companion of Oxus.

In later Kushan art, which reflected the development of a new style combining local Hellenistic Bactrian elements with Indian influences, Oxus' appearance might have been patterned on the depictions of Poseidon on the coins of Indo-Scythian king Maues, and on a coin of Huvishka he appears as a bearded man holding a staff (perhaps a trident) and a fish.

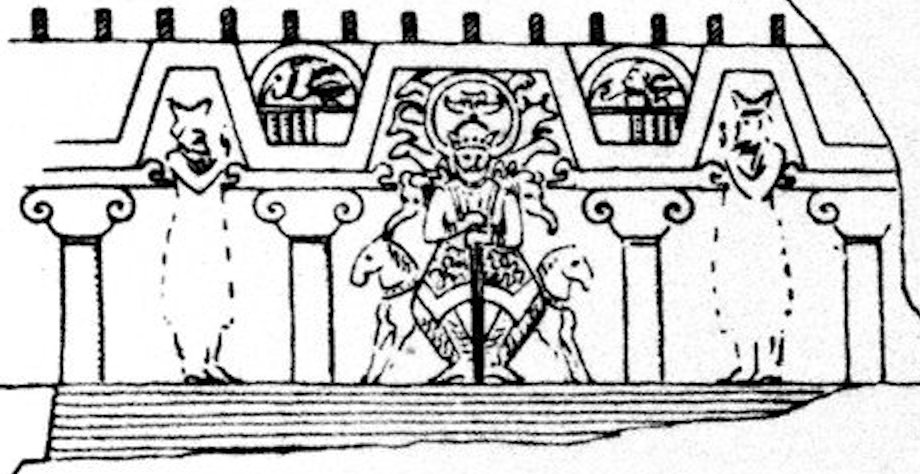
Figure seated on a throne with horse protomes on a painting from Dokhtar-i-Noshirwan.

While due to Oxus' popularity in Sogdia it is presumed that representations of him can be found in Sogdian art, no work of art from this region has been identified as a representation of him with certainty yet. Michael Shenkar suggests that he might have been represented in a zoomorphic form as a horse. He notes that a horse with streams of water and fish beneath its hooves depicted on the Miho funerary couch might be an example of this convention. He states that if the interpretation of the horse as Oxus' symbolic animal is accepted, it is also possible to tentatively identify him as the anthropomorphic deity seated on a throne supported by horse protomes, known from paintings from Panjakent, Bunjikat and Dokhtar-i-Noshirwan. However, the association between horses depicted in Sogdian funerary art with Oxus has been questioned by Sun Wujun. He argues that it is implausible that Oxus would be depicted in Sino-Sogdian art at all, and points out he was seemingly chiefly worshiped on the banks of Amu-Darya. He instead suggests that horses depicted in Sino-Sogdian ossuaries are to be understood as a symbolic representation of animal sacrifices meant for the deceased. He argues a funerary horse sacrifice might have been understood as a way to provide the souls of Sogdian nobles with a way to reach the afterlife.

It has additionally been proposed that Triton-like figure depicted on Saka grave goods from Tillya Tepe and on Indo-Greek coin of Hippostratus can be identified as Oxus.

== Worship ==
Michael Shenkar suggests that the worship of Oxus might have started in prehistory, and that he could have already been worshiped by temples belonging to the Bactria–Margiana Archaeological Complex excavated in Gonur Depe and Togolok, though he stresses that due to lack of textual sources this proposal must remain speculative.

=== In Bactria ===
The earliest textual evidence of the worship of Oxus, dated to the Achaemenid period, are personal names attested in Aramaic texts from Bactria from the fourth century BCE, such as Vaxšu-bandaka ("slave of Oxus" or "servant of Oxus"), Vaxšu-data ("created by Oxus") and Vaxšu-abra-data ("given by the clouds of Oxus"). Further examples occur in Hellenistic sources, for example Oxybazos ("strong through Oxus"), Oxydates ("given by Oxus"), Mithroaxos ("[given by] Mithra and Oxus") and possibly Oxyartes (if the translation "protected by Oxus" is accepted).

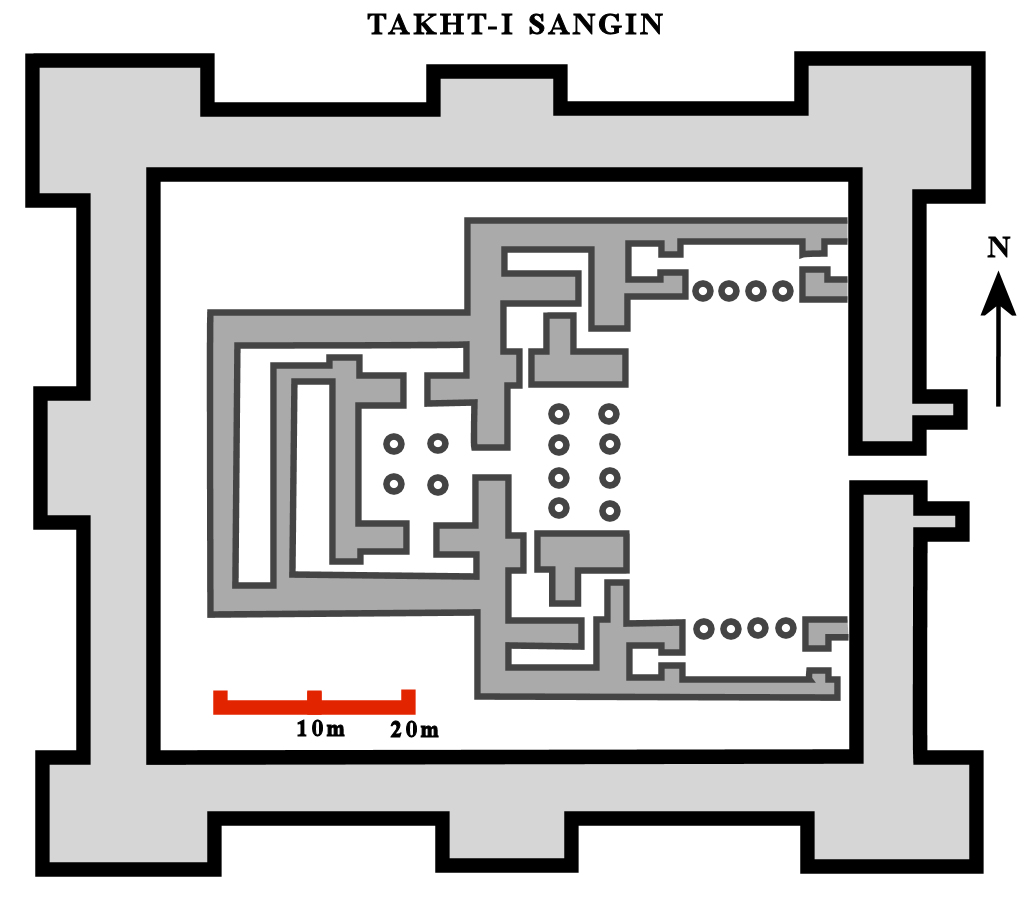
A plan of the temple of Oxus excavated in Takht-i Sangin.

In Takht-i Sangin a temple dedicated to Oxus has been discovered. According to a number of Muslim geographers from the ninth and tenth centuries, this area was customarily considered the beginning of Jayhun (Oxus), which might constitute a survival of an originally Bactrian tradition responsible for the selection of this location as a cult center of the related river god. Excavations indicate that the temple was originally founded in the early Seleucid period, and remained in use until the reign of the Kushan king Huvishka. One of the objects from this site is a stone altar following Greek artistic conventions inscribed with a dedication of a certain Atrosokes to Oxus. His name is Bactrian and can be translated as "burning with sacred fire", and it is possible that he was a priest. Further excavations revealed three more similar Greek inscriptions, seemingly left behind by Bactrian worshipers of Oxus.

A seal with a human-headed bull from the Oxus Treasure is inscribed with Oxus' name written in the Aramaic script. It has been pointed out that the objects found in the temple of Oxus in Takht-i Sangin have close parallels among these belonging to the Oxus Treasure, which might indicate the latter was originally found in the same location. It has been suggested that priests of Oxus hid a number of objects out of fear of looting during a period of increased activity of the Yuezhi in the second half of the second century BCE, but failed to recover them, leaving the Oxus Treasure to only be discovered some two thousand years later.

Henri-Paul Francfort has suggested that the temple with indented niches discovered in Ai-Khanoum might also have been a Bactrian sanctuary of Oxus.

Since Oxus is not mentioned in the Rabatak inscription, he was most likely not worshiped by Kushan rulers who arrived in Bactria from the north, though it is nonetheless presumed he remained popular among the Bactrians even at the time of the Muslim conquest of Transoxiana. He is still frequently referenced in legal texts from the seventh and eighth centuries.

=== In Sogdia ===
Oxus was also a popular deity in Sogdia, as indicated by a large number of theophoric names invoking him. If the interpretation of the toponym Xušūfaγn as "temple of Oxus" is accepted, a sanctuary dedicated to him might have existed in the proximity of Samarkand. Next to Nana, he was the deity most commonly worshiped by Sogdian merchants whose inscriptions have been discovered in the proximity of the Indus River. A reference to the worship of Oxus among the Sogdians might also be present in Youyang Zazu, a Chinese source from the Tang period, which mentions a temple in Kobadiyan (俱德建國; Judejianguo) dedicated to a deity imagined to take the form of a golden horse, who purportedly could be seen floating in the Oxus river on Nowruz. While the temple dedicated to Oxus located in Takht-i Sangin was already abandoned at this time, it is nonetheless possible that this account documents the survival of traditions originally associated with it.

=== Other attestations ===
In addition to being a popular deity in Bactria and Sogdia, Oxus was also worshiped in Chorasmia. According to Al-Biruni a festival known as Wakhšāngam was still held in the honor of "Wakhš (...), the angel who has the watch over the water, and especially over the river Oxus" in this area in the tenth century.

No evidence exists for any form of worship of Oxus by Western Iranian peoples. Mary Boyce and Frantz Grenet however point out that his veneration in the east can be considered a phenomenon analogous with the cults of the local rivers documented in the Persepolis Fortification Archive, and additionally suggest that in Sasanian times the corresponding river was identified as Vanhvi Daitya, where Zoroaster according to tradition received a revelation.
