= Malik Baba =

Malik Baba is a shrine in the Ahal Region of Turkmenistan and a national heritage site. It is about 1 kilometre (0.62 mi) south of Ulug Depe.

== Site ==
A large greenish-marble tomb is the object of reverence. Decorated with imagery of sword, shield, and arrows, it is believed to house the remains of Malik Ajdar Palwan. Behind the tomb, there is a tiled colonnade supported by five turquoise domes. In the east, stands a square mausoleum with a dome but no tomb.

It was the last construction in or around Ulug Depe.
