= Geoksyur Oasis =

Prehistoric archaeological complex in southern Turkmenistan

Coordinates: 37.448219°N 60.679939°E

Geoksyur Oasis is a major prehistoric archaeological complex in southern Turkmenistan. It is located about 15km east of the city of Tejen, in the valley of Tedjen river (Hari Rud) in the foothills of the Kopetdag mountains, to the east of Altyndepe.

Systematic excavations began in 1955 by the South Turkmenistan Complex Archaeological Expedition.

== Location ==
This location is in the center of a cluster of nine primary mound-settlements in the desert region on the northern Iranian border. Geoksyur Oasis extends over an area of 12 ha. It is 15 kilometres (9.3 mi) to the east of the city of Tedzhen. Prominent settlements include Dashlidji-depe, Akcha-depe, Aina-depe, Yalangach-depe, Mullali-depe, Chong-depe, and Berdysyčran-depe

During the Eneolithic Period (4th – early 3rd century BC), Geoksyur was revealed to contain "adobe multi-room houses and group burial chambers". The settlement was affected by shifting sand dunes and scarcity of water.

The space between houses was used for burials. Archaeologists uncovered distinctive group burial chambers (tholos-style tombs) built between the houses, containing multiple skeletons alongside grave goods.

The inhabitants built canals from the Tedjen River to irrigate some 50 hectares, where they cultivated barley. These are some of the earliest known artificial irrigation networks in the world.

Distinctive fine ceramics were also found with dichromatic (two-colour) red and black paintings decorated with geometric designs. These were very different from the other ceramics generally found in the area. Many female terracotta figurines were also discovered.

Copper tools, and imported semi-precious stones—such as lapis lazuli, turquoise, and carnelian were also found. They demonstrate extensive long-distance trade connections across the Iranian plateau and Central Asia.

The culture of Geoksyurtepe was correlated with an eastern Anau group of tribes linked to Elam and Mesopotamia.

== Berdysyčran-depe ==
A more recently discovered site of Berdysyčran-depe is also located in the former delta of Tejen River. It was settled during the Namazga V period, which is after Geoksyur Oasis was abandoned. The site is located 15 km south of Hapuz-depe, which dates back to the Early and Middle Bronze Age.

Berdysyčran-depe is the first significant site of the Oxus civilisation (Bactria–Margiana Archaeological Complex) found along the Tedjen River.

== DNA studies ==
Genetic studies of 26 individuals excavated from Geoksyur show predominantly Near Eastern maternal and paternal ancestry. There is also a minor local Central Asian input, confirming close demographic ties to early farming populations of the Iranian plateau.

== See also ==
- Bactria–Margiana Archaeological Complex
- Gonur Depe
