= Berdysyčran-depe =

Bronze Age settlement in Turkmenistan

Coordinates: 36°58′41″N 60°59′13″E

Berdysyčran-depe (turk. Berdysyçran-depe, рус. Бердысычран-депе) is an ancient Bronze Age settlement located in the former delta of Tejen River, 60 km south of Tejen (city), Turkmenistan.

== Archaeological research ==
Berdysyčran-depe was surveyed in 2015 by a Turkmen-Polish archaeological expedition of the University of Warsaw, headed by Barbara Kaim

== General characteristics ==
The total area of Berdysyčran-depe is about 15 hectares. The site consists of two parts. The first, the southern mound, is steeper, with an area of about 1 hectare and a height of 6 metres. The second mound, is a more flattened with a height of 7 metres and covering an area of 2.1 hectares. The area between these hills is densely covered with pottery. The analysis of all collected material allowed to date the site to the Middle, Late and Final Bronze Age (2250-1500 BC), i.e. the time corresponding to the rise, flouring and fall of the Oxus Civilization - Bactria–Margiana Archaeological Complex.

== Findings ==
Among the materials collected by archaeologists are fragments of pottery, a typical female terracotta figurine from the Namazga V period. , fragments of alabaster vessels and badly damaged bronze objects

== Berdysyčran-depe and the settlement of Geoksyur oasis ==
Berdysyčran-depe was settled during the Namazga V period, which is, after Geoksyur Oasis was abandoned. The site is located 15 km south of Khapuz-depe, which dates back to the Early and Middle Bronze Age.

== See also ==
- History of Central Asia
- Bactria–Margiana Archaeological Complex
- South Turkmenistan Complex Archaeological Expedition
