= Bactria–Margiana Archaeological Complex =

c. 2250–1700 BC Central Asian archaeological culture

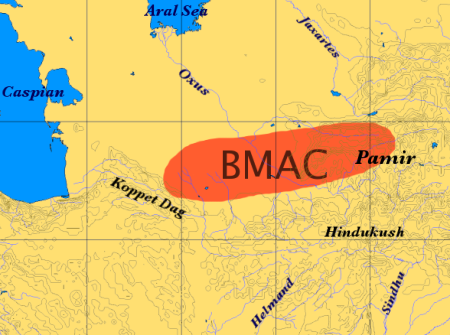
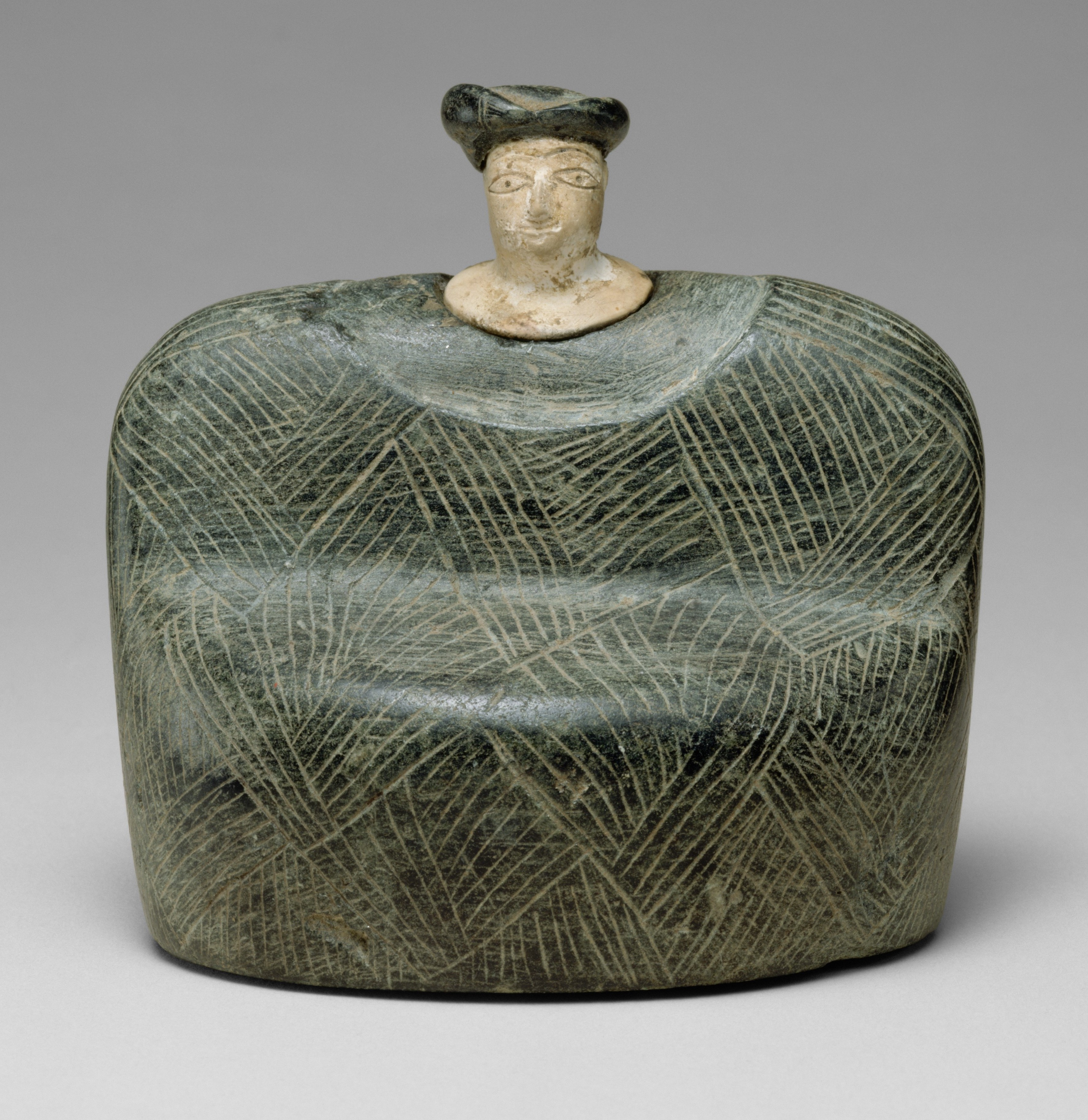
- The extent of the BMAC (according to the Encyclopedia of Indo-European Culture) Female statuette, an example of a "Bactrian princess"; late 3rd–early 2nd millennium BC; steatite or chlorite and alabaster; 9 × 9.4 cm; Metropolitan Museum of Art (New York City)

- Location within Continental Asia
- 37.30111°N 64.15531°E
- Location: Southern Central Asia, mainly in modern-day Eastern Turkmenistan, northern Afghanistan, southern Uzbekistan, and Western Tajikistan
- Region: Margiana, Bactria

Site notes
- Excavation dates: Viktor Sarianidi (late 1960s to 1979)
- Condition: Ruins

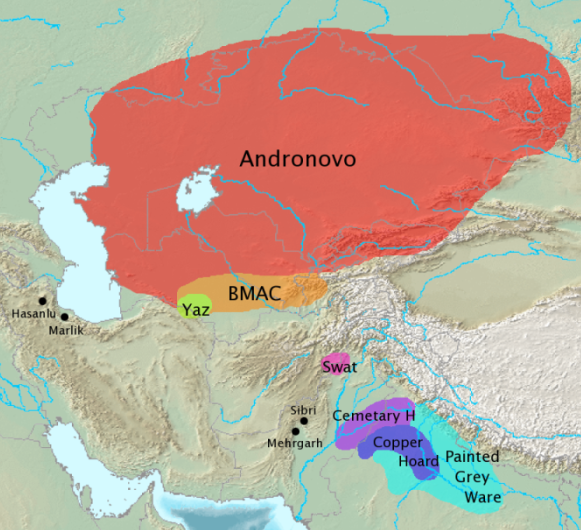
Archaeological cultures associated with Indo-Iranian migrations (after EIEC). The Andronovo, BMAC and Yaz cultures have often been associated with Indo-Iranian migrations. The GGC (Swat), Cemetery H, Copper Hoard and PGW cultures are candidates for cultures associated with Indo-Aryan migrations.

The Bactria–Margiana Archaeological Complex (BMAC) is the modern archaeological designation for a particular Middle Bronze Age civilisation of southern Central Asia in regions around the Caspian Sea and Aral Sea. This civilization is also known as the Oxus Civilization.

The civilization thrived between about 2500 BCE and 1700 BCE, though there is debate about details and interpretation of data.

Although commonly referred to as the “Oxus civilization” and formally designated as the “Bactria–Margiana Archaeological Complex” (BMAC), recent studies have questioned the geographic adequacy of these terms. While the traditional labels emphasise the concentration of major urban sites in Margiana and northern Bactria, new archaeological surveys and excavations show that the cultural core of this Bronze Age complex was considerably broader.

Significant sites have been documented across northeastern Iran, within the historical region of Greater Khorasan, including newly excavated settlements such as Tepe Chalow, Kalat-e Yavar, and Shahrak-e Firouzeh, along with numerous surveyed locations exhibiting characteristic BMAC material culture. On the basis of this wider distribution—extending from Sabzevar and Nishapur to the Murghab delta and Tajikistan—some scholars (e.g., Biscione & Vahdati) argue that “BMAC” and “Oxus Civilization” are overly restrictive, either overlooking formative areas or limiting the phenomenon to Bactria and Margiana.". Because the full spread of sites corresponds closely to the historical expanse of Greater Khorasan and reflects long-term cultural continuity into the Iron Age and later periods, these authors propose the broader term “Greater Khorasan Civilization” (GKC) for this archaeological complex.

There are a few later (c. 1950–1450 BC) sites in northern Bactria, today southern Uzbekistan, but they are mostly graveyards belonging to the BMAC-related Sapalli culture. A single BMAC site, known as Dashli, lies in southern Bactria, current territory of northern Afghanistan. Sites found further east, in southwestern Tajikistan, though contemporary with the main BMAC sites in Margiana, are only graveyards, with no urban developments associated with them.

The civilisation was named BMAC by the Soviet archaeologist Viktor Sarianidi in 1976 when he was excavating in northern Afghanistan (1969–1979). Sarianidi's excavations from the late 1970s onward revealed numerous monumental structures in many sites, fortified by impressive walls and gates. Reports on the BMAC were primarily published in Soviet journals. A journalist from The New York Times wrote in 2001 that during the years of the Soviet Union, the findings were largely unknown to the West until Sarianidi's work began to be translated in the 1990s. However, some publications by Soviet authors, like Masson, Sarianidi, Atagarryev, and Berdiev, had been available to the West, translated in the first half of 1970s, slightly before Sarianidi labelled the findings as BMAC.

== Origin and chronology ==
The civilisation's urban phase or Integration Era was dated in 2010 by Sandro Salvatori to c. 2400–1950 BC, but a different view is held by Nadezhda A. Dubova and Bertille Lyonnet, c. 2250–1700 BC.

Italian archaeologists, like Massimo Vidale and Dennys Frenez, support Sandro Salvatori's hypothesis that Namazga V is the beginning of the ultimate urban phase called BMAC, belonging to the Integration Era (c. 2400–1950 BC). On the other hand, Russian and French archaeologists Nadezhda Dubova and Bertille Lyonnet consider there was a gap between the end of Namazga III phase and the beginning of BMAC in Margiana, and that most of the sites both in Margiana and Bactria were founded on virgin soil only around 2250 BC lasting until 1700 BC.

== Etymology ==
The region was first named Bakhdi in Old Persian, which then formed the Persian satrapy of Marguš (perhaps from the Sumerian term Marhasi), the capital of which was Merv, in modern-day southeastern Turkmenistan. It was then called Bāxtriš in Middle Persian, and Baxl in New Persian. The region was also mentioned in ancient Sanskrit texts as बाह्लीक or Bāhlīka. The modern term Bactria is derived from Ancient Greek Βακτρία (Baktría), modern Balkh.

== Early Food-Producing Era ==
There is archaeological evidence of settlement in the well-watered northern foothills of the Kopet Dag during the Jeitun era (7200−4600 BC). In this region, mud brick houses were first occupied during the Jeitun, also called the Early Food-Producing Era. The inhabitants were farmers with origins in West Asia who kept herds of goats and sheep and grew wheat and barley. Jeitun has given its name to the whole Neolithic in the northern foothills of the Köpet Dag. At the late Neolithic site of Chagylly Depe, farmers increasingly grew the kinds of crops that are typically associated with irrigation in an arid environment, such as hexaploid bread wheat, which became predominant during the Chalcolithic period. This region is dotted with the multi-period hallmarks characteristic of the ancient Near East, similar to those southwest of the Köpet Dag in the Gorgan Plain of Iran.

== Regionalization Era ==
The Regionalization Era begins in Anau IA with a pre-Chalcolithic phase also in the Kopet Dag piedmont region from 4600 to 4000 BC, then the Chalcolithic period develops from 4000 to 2800 BC in Namazga I-III, Ýylgynly Depe, and Altyn Depe. During this Copper Age, the population of the region grew. Archaeologist Vadim Mikhaĭlovich Masson, who led the South Turkmenistan Complex Archaeological Expedition of 1946, saw signs that people migrated to the region from central Iran at this time, bringing metallurgy and other innovations, but thought that the newcomers soon blended with the Jeitun farmers. (Vadim was the son of archaeologist Mikhail Masson, who had previously already started work in this same area.) By contrast, a re-excavation of Monjukli Depe in 2010 found a distinct break in settlement history between the late Neolithic and early Chalcolithic eras there.

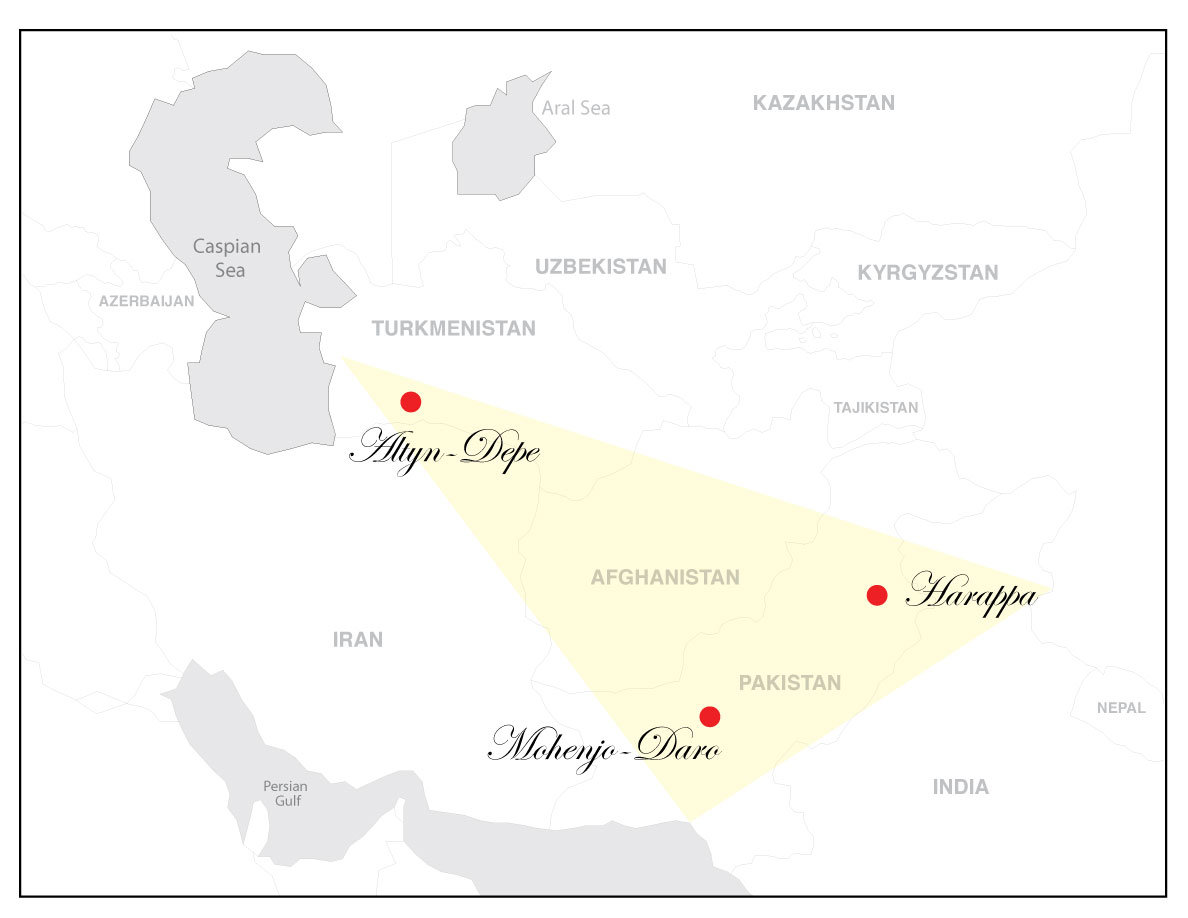
Altyn-Depe location on the modern Middle East map as well as location of other Eneolithic cultures (Harappa and Mohenjo-daro).

Major chalcolithic settlements sprang up at Kara-Depe and Namazga-Depe. In addition, there were smaller settlements at Anau, Dashlyji, and Yassy-depe. Settlements similar to the early level at Anau also appeared further east– in the ancient delta of the river Tedzen, the site of the Geoksiur Oasis. About 3500 BC, the cultural unity of the area split into two pottery styles: colourful in the west (Anau, Kara-Depe and Namazga-Depe) and more austere in the east at Altyn-Depe and the Geoksiur Oasis settlements. This may reflect the formation of two tribal groups. It seems that around 3000 BC, people from Geoksiur migrated into the Murghab delta (where small, scattered settlements appeared) and reached further east into the Zerafshan Valley in Transoxiana. In both areas pottery typical of Geoksiur was in use. In Transoxiana they settled at Sarazm near Pendjikent. To the south the foundation layers of Shahr-i Sōkhta on the bank of the Helmand River in south-eastern Iran contained pottery of the Altyn-Depe and Geoksiur type. Thus the farmers of Iran, Turkmenistan and Afghanistan were connected by a scattering of farming settlements.

== Late Regionalization Era ==
At Altyndepe, the Namazga III phase, which spanned from 3200 to 2800 BCE, exhibited a late Chalcolithic culture at the beginning of the Late Regionalization Era.

In the Early Bronze Age, at the end of the Late Regionalization Era (2800 to 2400 BC), the culture of the Köpetdag oases in the Altyndepe site developed a proto-urban society. This corresponds to phase IV at Namazga-Tepe. Altyndepe was a major centre even then. Pottery was wheel-turned and grapes were grown.

== Integration Era: Oxus Civilization ==
The height of the urban development was reached in the Middle Bronze Age, also known as Integration Era, mainly in three regions, Kopet Dag piedmont, Margiana, and southern Bactria, as well as some cemetery remains recently found in southwestern Tajikistan.

=== Kopet Dag, Namazga V phase ===
BMAC's urban period begins in the Kopet Dag piedmont, as per Massimo Vidale, corresponding to Namazga-Depe level V (c. 2400-2000 BC). Namazga Depe reaching c. 52 hectares and holding maybe 17,000–20,000 inhabitants, and Altyn Depe with its maximum size of c. 25 hectares and 7,000–10,000 inhabitants, were the two big cities in Kopet Dag piedmont. This urban development is considered to have lasted, not from 2400 BC, but from c. 2250 to 1700 BC by Lyonnet and Dubova's recent publication.

=== Margiana, Kelleli phase ===
Identification of the first large settling in Margiana was possible through excavations at Kelleli 3 and 4, and these are the type sites of Kelleli phase. Massimo Vidale (2017) considers that the Kelleli phase was characterised by the appearance of the first palatial compounds from 2400 to 2000 BC. Kelleli is located around 40 km northwest of Gonur; featuring Kelleli 3 with four hectares, characterised by towers in a double perimetral wall, four equal entrances, and houses in the southwest of the site. Kelleli 4 settlement is around three hectares, with the same characteristics in its wall. Sandro Salvatori (1998) commented that Kelleli phase began sightly later than Namazga V period.

=== Margiana, Gonur phase ===
Gonur phase was considered, by Sarianidi, as a southward movement of the previous Kelleli phase people. In the ancient region of Margiana, the site Gonur Depe is the largest of all settlements in this period and is located at the delta of Murghab river in southern Turkmenistan, with an area of around 55 hectares. An almost elliptical fortified complex, known as Gonur North includes the so-called "Monumental Palace", other minor buildings, temples and ritual places, together with the "Royal Necropolis", and water reservoirs, all dated by Italian archaeologists from around 2400 to 1900 BC. However French and Russian scholars like Lyonnet and Dubova date it to c. 2250-1700 BC.

=== Southern Bactria ===
In southern Bactria, northern Afghanistan, the site Dashly 3 is regarded to be also from Middle Bronze Age to Late Bronze Age (2300–1700 BC) occupation, but its beginning is probably later than 2300 BC, although earlier than 2000 BC, if new datings for BMAC by Lyonnet and Dubova are taken into account. The old Dashly 3 complex, sometimes identified as a palace, is a fortified rectangular 88 m x 84 m compound. The square building had massive double outer walls and in the middle of each wall was a protruding salient composed of a T-shaped corridor flanked by two L-shaped corridors.

=== Southwestern Tajikistan ===
New archaeological research has recently found at three ancient cemeteries in southwestern Tajikistan called Farkhor, Gelot (in Kulob District), and Darnajchi, ceramics influenced by Namazga IV and Namazga V transitional period from Early to Middle Bronze Age, which can suggest a presence of BMAC inhabitants in this region earlier considered out of their influx. Gelot's grave N6-13 was dated to 2203–2036 cal BC (2 sigma), and Darnajchi's grave N2-2 as 2456-2140 cal BC (2 sigma). Farkhor's cemetery is located on the right bank of Panj river, very near the Indus Civilization's site Shortughai.

== Material culture ==
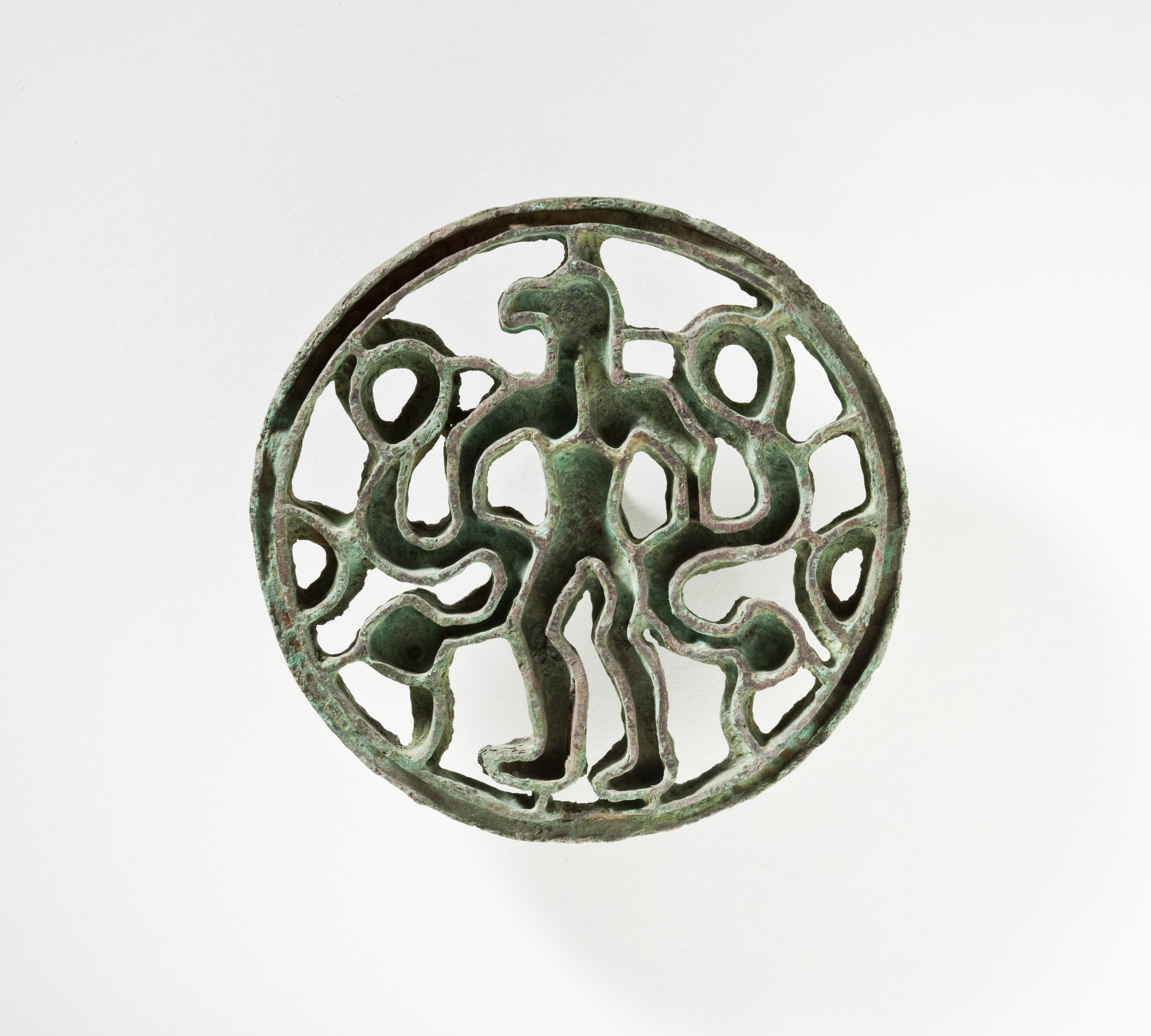
Bird-headed man with snakes; 2000–1500 BC; bronze; 7.30 cm; from Northern Afghanistan; Los Angeles County Museum of Art (USA)

=== Agriculture and economy ===
The inhabitants of the BMAC were sedentary people who practised irrigation farming of wheat and barley. With their impressive material culture including monumental architecture, bronze tools, ceramics, and jewellery of semiprecious stones, the complex exhibits many of the hallmarks of civilisation. The complex can be compared to proto-urban settlements in the Helmand basin at Mundigak in western Afghanistan and Shahr-e Sukhteh in eastern Iran, or at Harappa and Mohenjo-daro in the Indus Valley.

Models of two-wheeled carts from c. 3000 BC found at Altyn-Depe are the earliest evidence of wheeled transport in Central Asia, though model wheels have come from contexts possibly somewhat earlier. Judging by the type of harness, carts were initially pulled by oxen or a bull. However, camels were domesticated within the BMAC. A model of a cart drawn by a camel of c. 2200 BC was found at Altyn-Depe.

=== Art ===
Fertility goddesses, named "Bactrian princesses", made from limestone, chlorite and clay reflect agrarian Bronze Age society, while the extensive corpus of metal objects point to a sophisticated tradition of metalworking. Wearing large stylised dresses, as well as headdresses that merge with the hair, "Bactrian princesses" embody the ranking goddess, character of the Central Asian mythology that plays a regulatory role, pacifying the untamed forces.

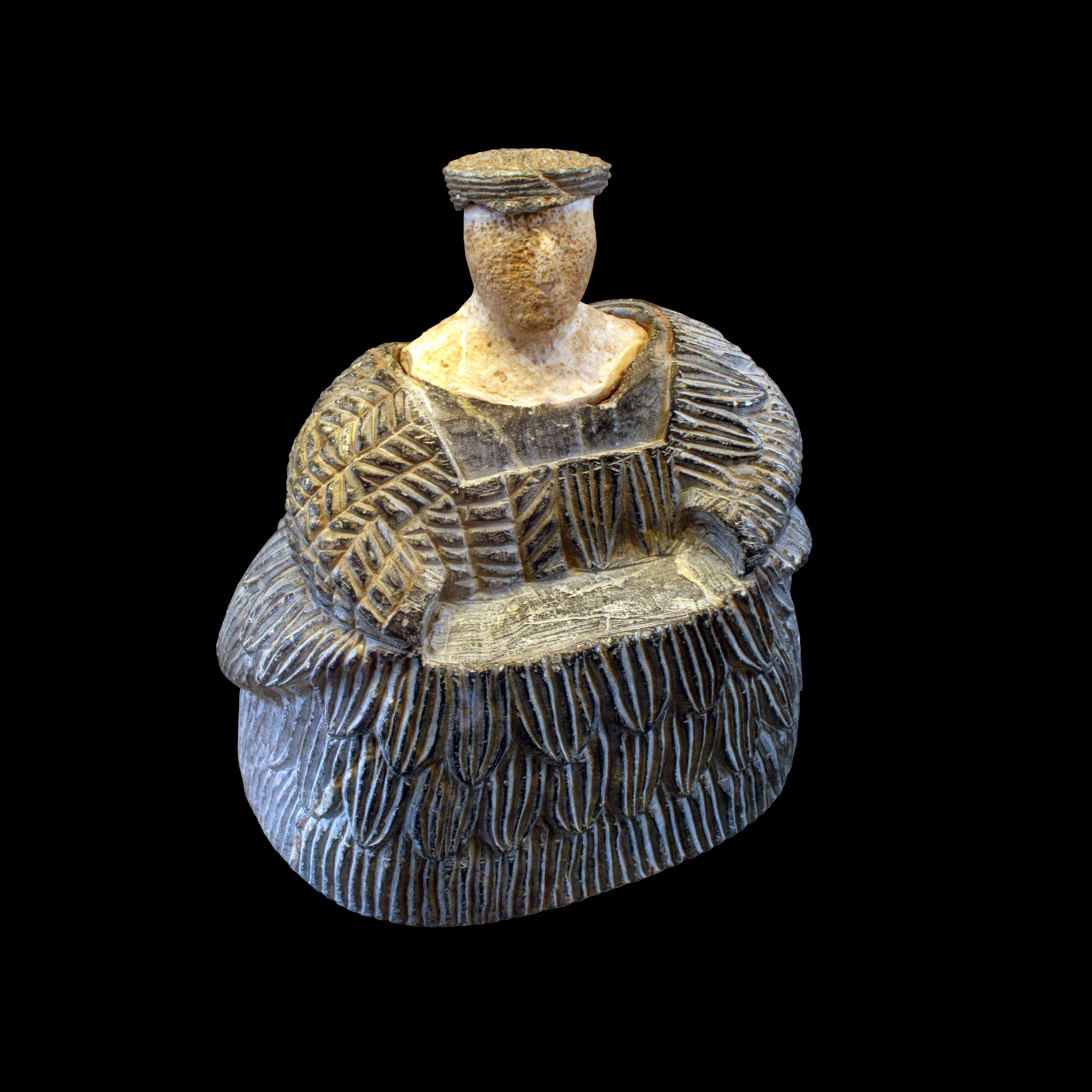
Female figurine of the "Bactrian princess" type; between 3rd millennium and 2nd millennium BC; chlorite mineral group (dress and headdresses) and limestone (face and neck); height: 17.3 cm, width: 16.1 cm; Louvre

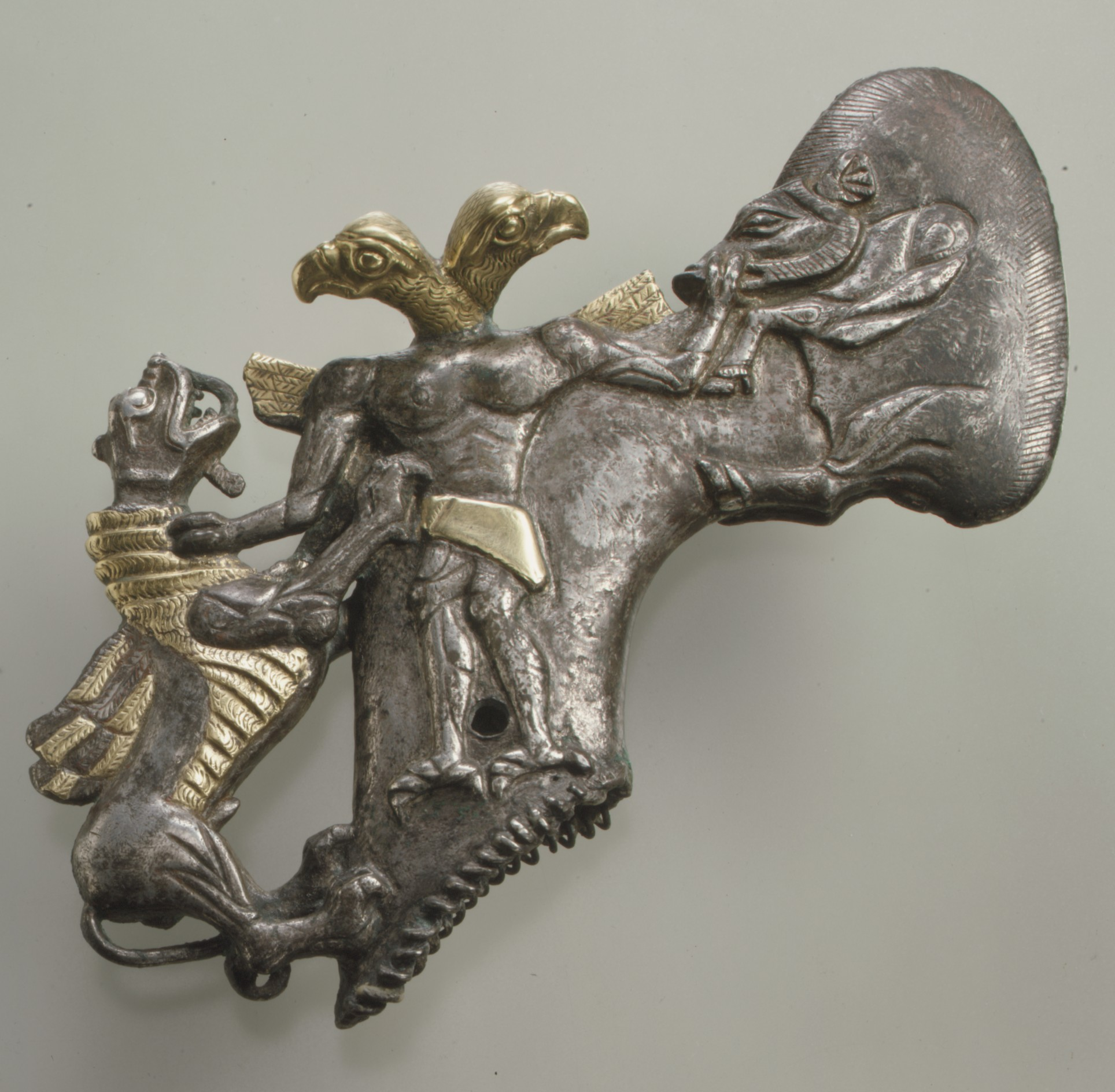
Axe with eagle-headed demon & animals; late 3rd millennium-early 2nd millennium BC; gilt silver; length: 15 cm; Metropolitan Museum of Art (New York City)

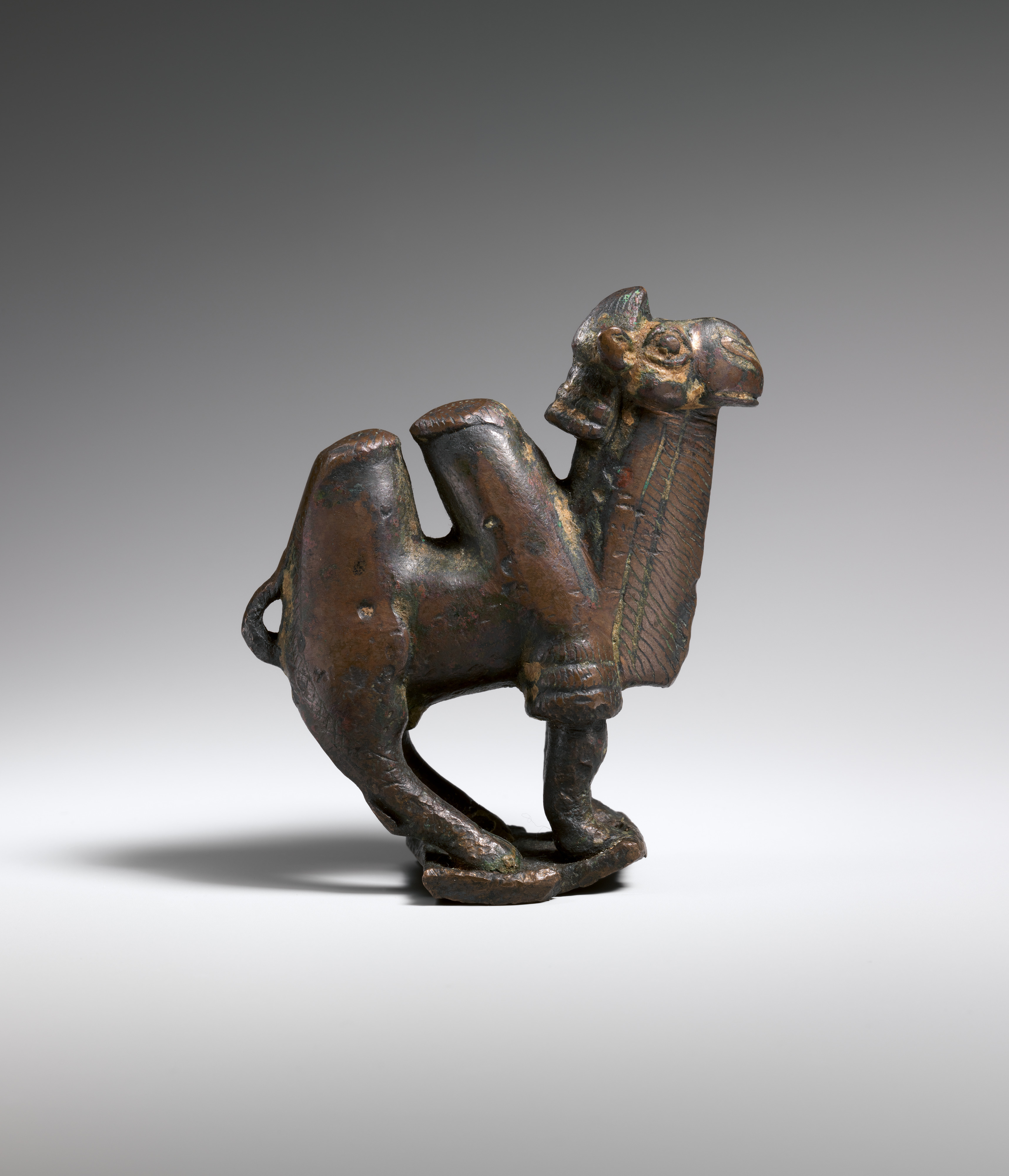
Camel figurine; late 3rd–early 2nd millennium BCE; copper alloy; 8.89 cm; Metropolitan Museum of Art

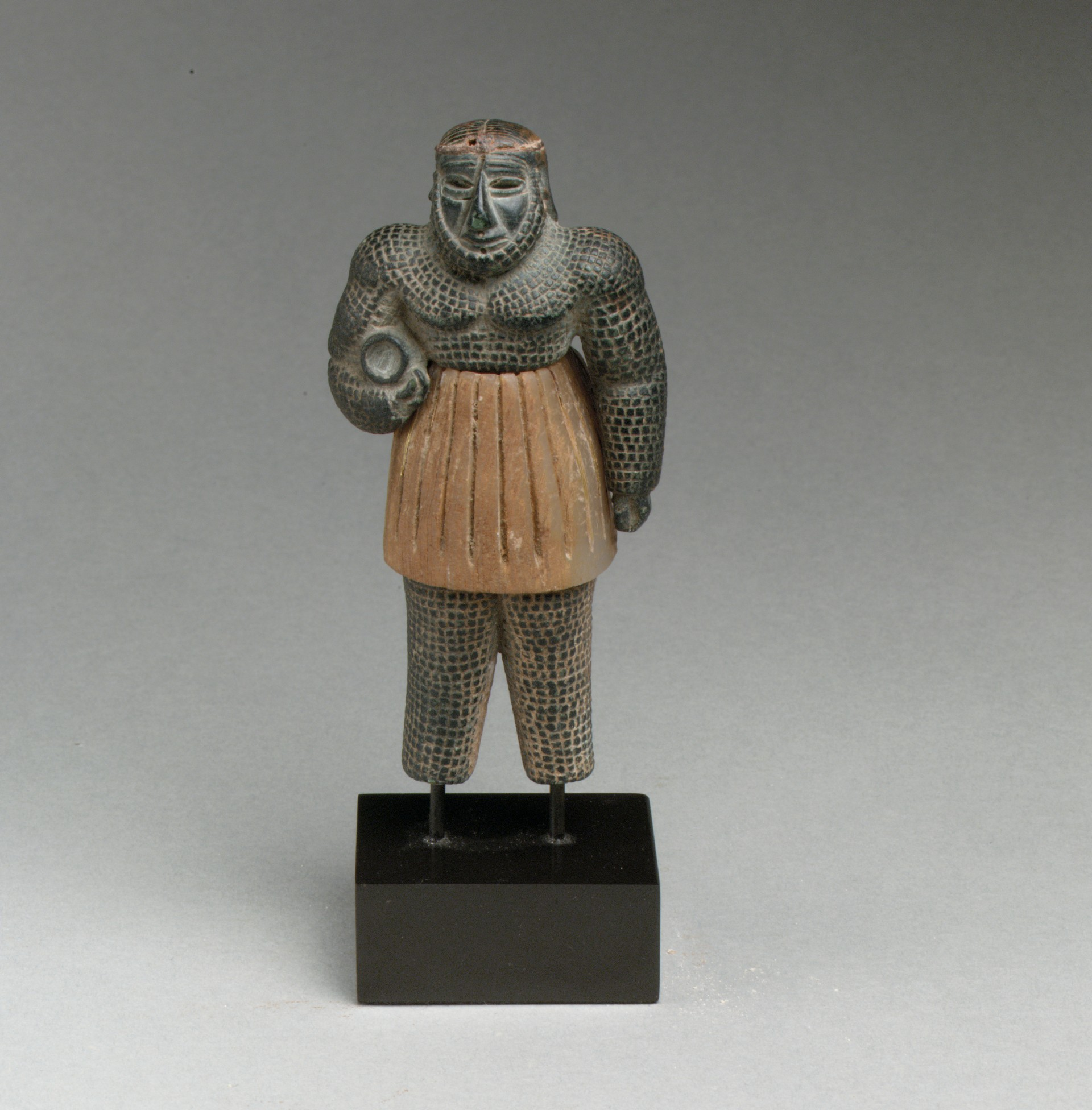
Male figure; late 3rd–early 2nd millennium BC; chlorite, calcite, gold and iron; height: 10.1 cm; Metropolitan Museum of Art

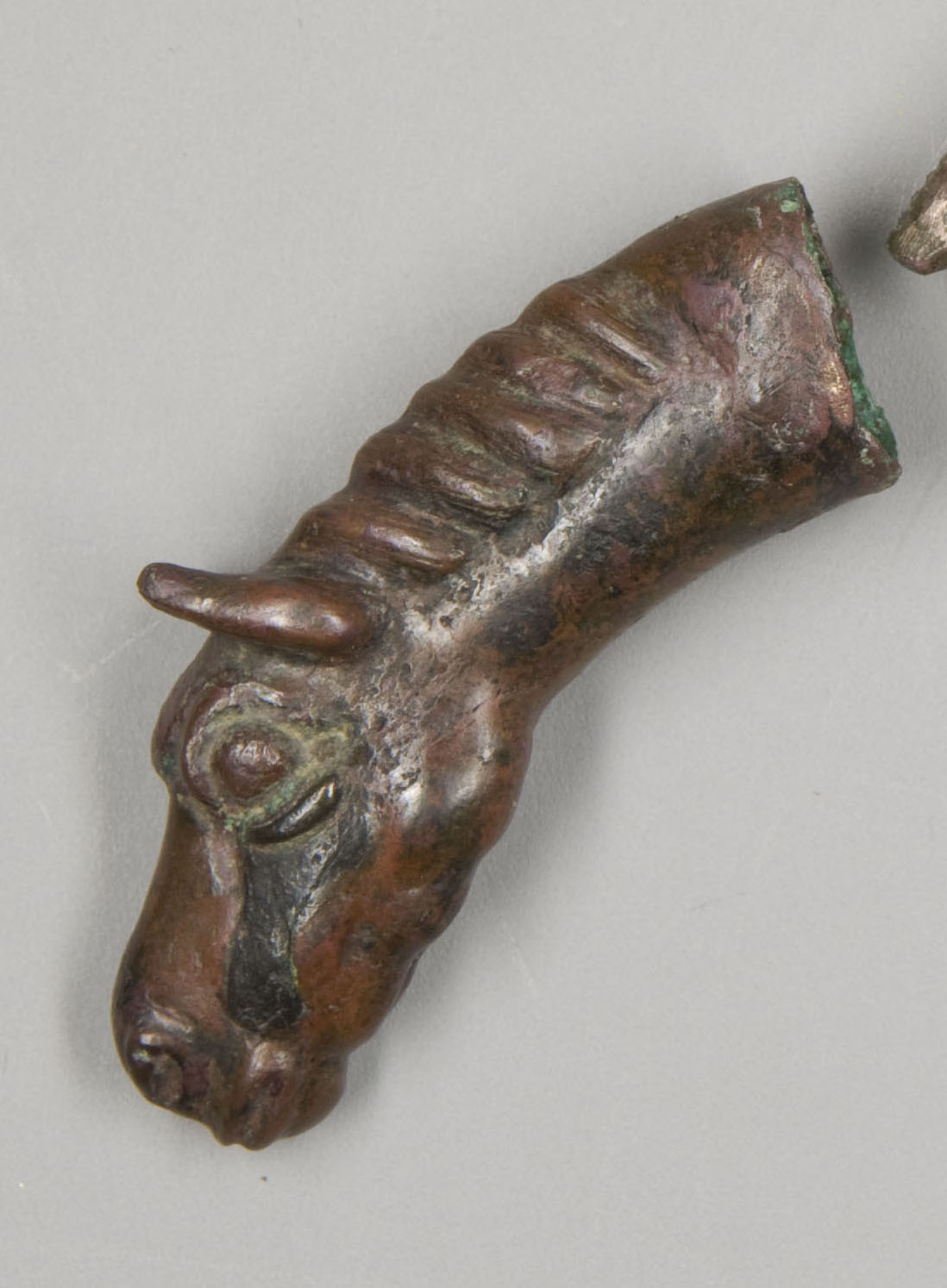
Axe head; late 3rd–early 2nd millennium BC; copper alloy; height: 2.8 cm, length: 7.2 cm, thickness: 1.8 cm, weight: 82.5 g; Metropolitan Museum of Art

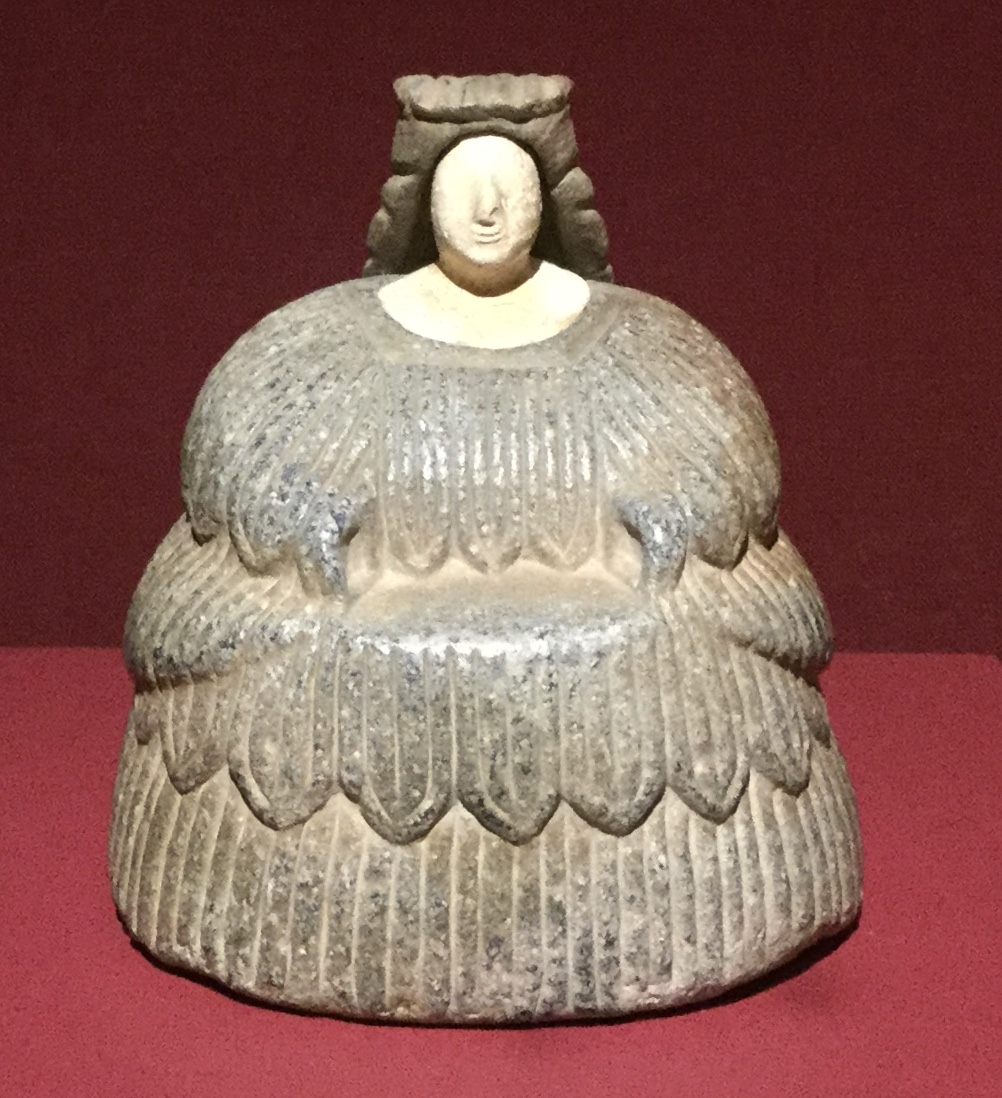
Female figurine of the "Bactrian princess" type; between 3rd millennium and 2nd millennium BC; grey chlorite (dress and headdresses) and calcite (face); Barbier-Mueller Museum (Geneva, Switzerland)

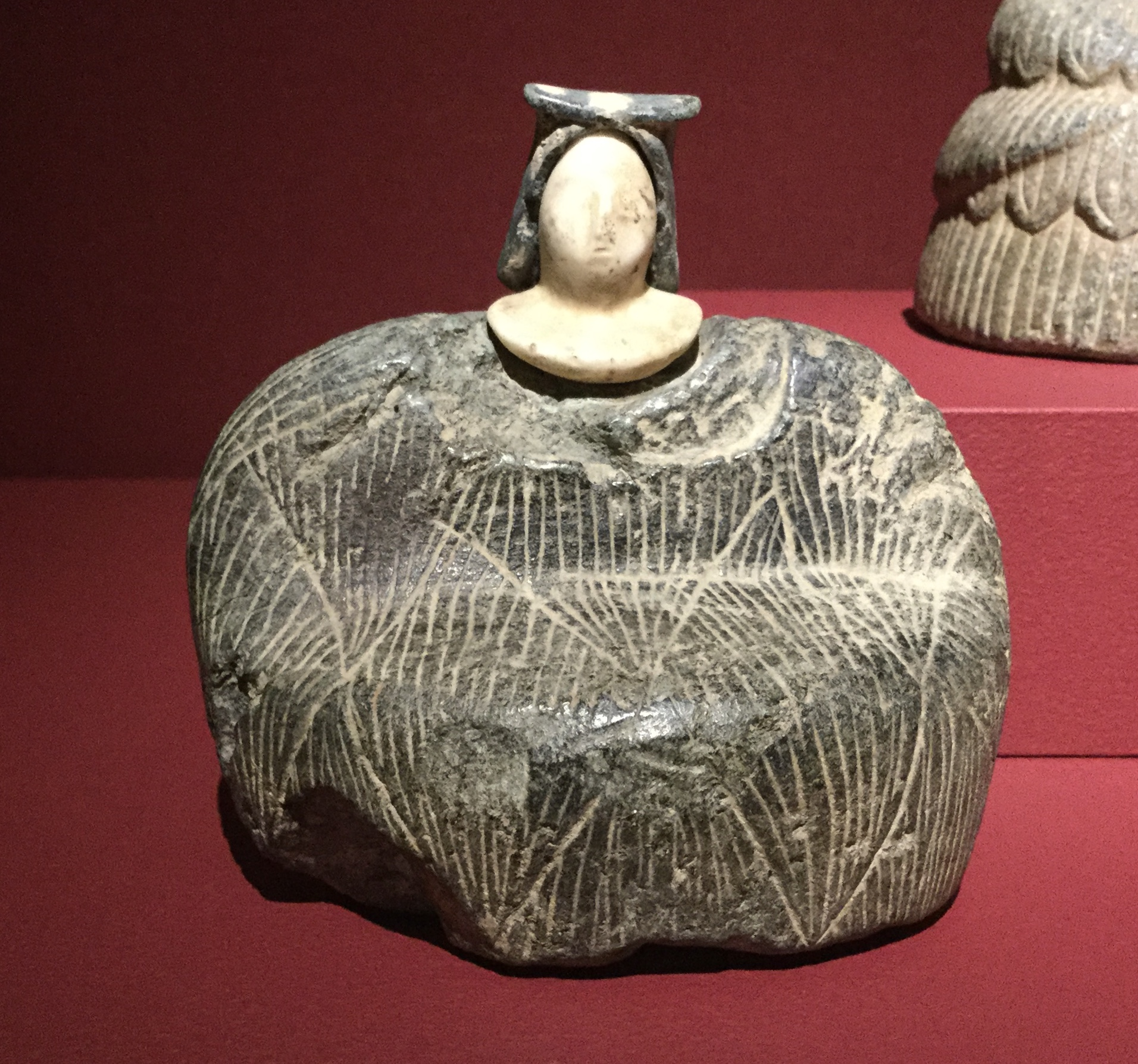
Female figurine of the "Bactrian princess" type; between 3rd millennium and 2nd millennium BC; grey chlorite (dress and headdresses) and calcite (face); Barbier-Mueller Museum

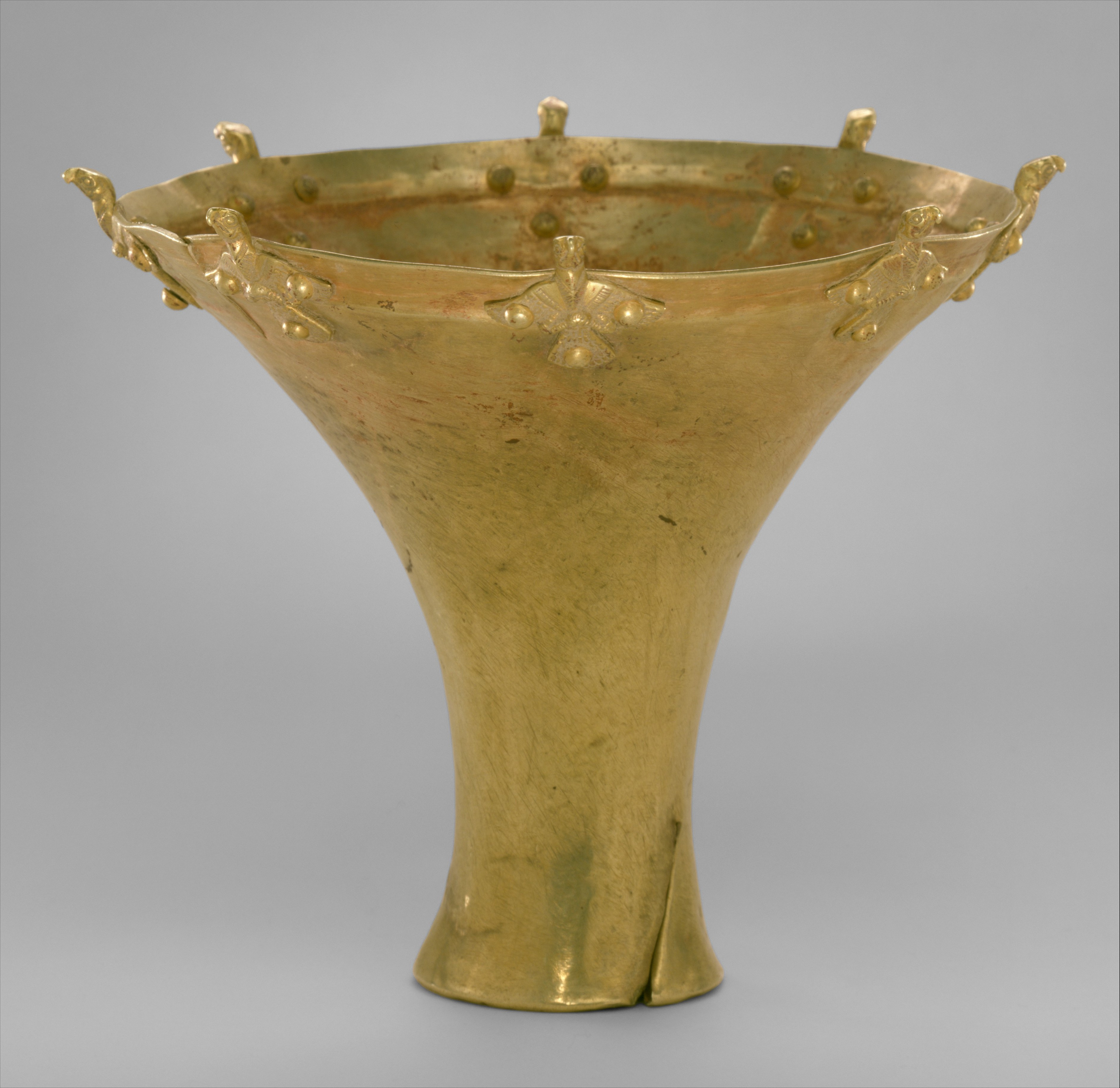
Beaker with birds on the rim; late 3rd–early 2nd millennium BC; electrum; height: 12 cm, width: 13.3 cm, depth: 4.5 cm; Metropolitan Museum of Art

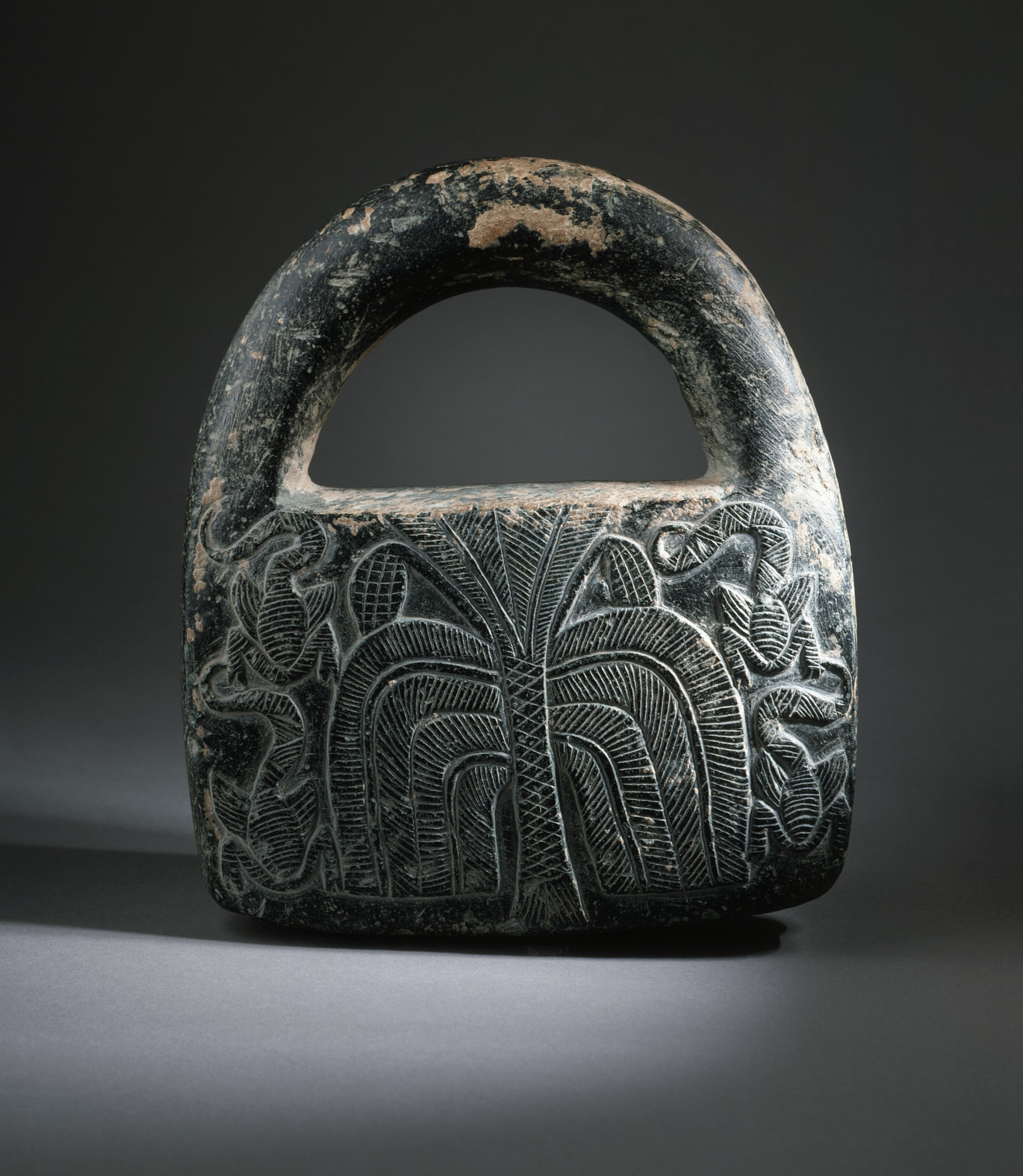
Handled weight; late 3rd–early 2nd millennium BC; chlorite; 25.08 x 19.69 x 4.45 cm; Los Angeles County Museum of Art (USA)

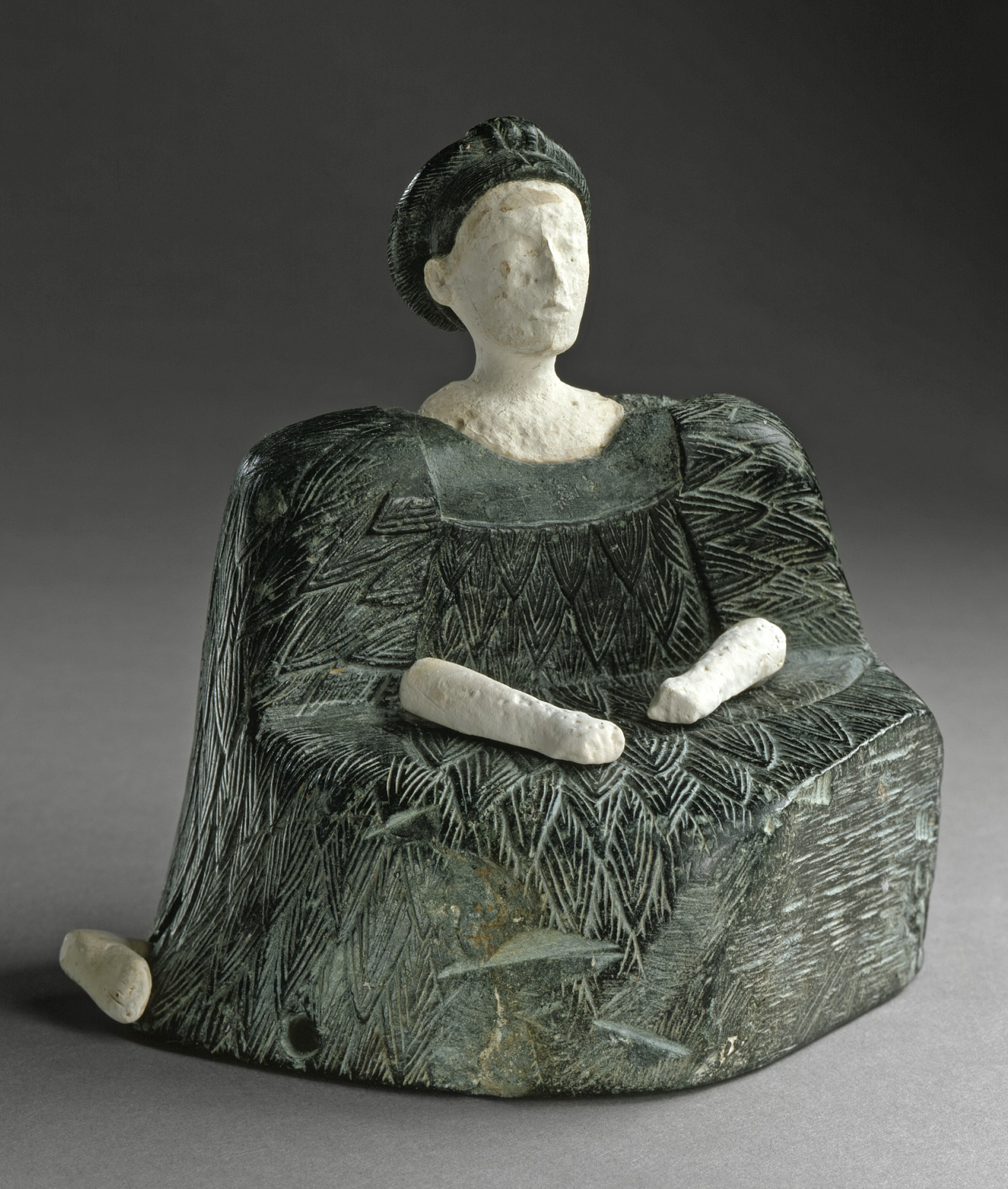
Female figurine of the "Bactrian princess" type; 2500–1500; chlorite (dress and headdresses) and limestone (head, hands and a leg); height: 13.33 cm; Los Angeles County Museum of Art (USA)

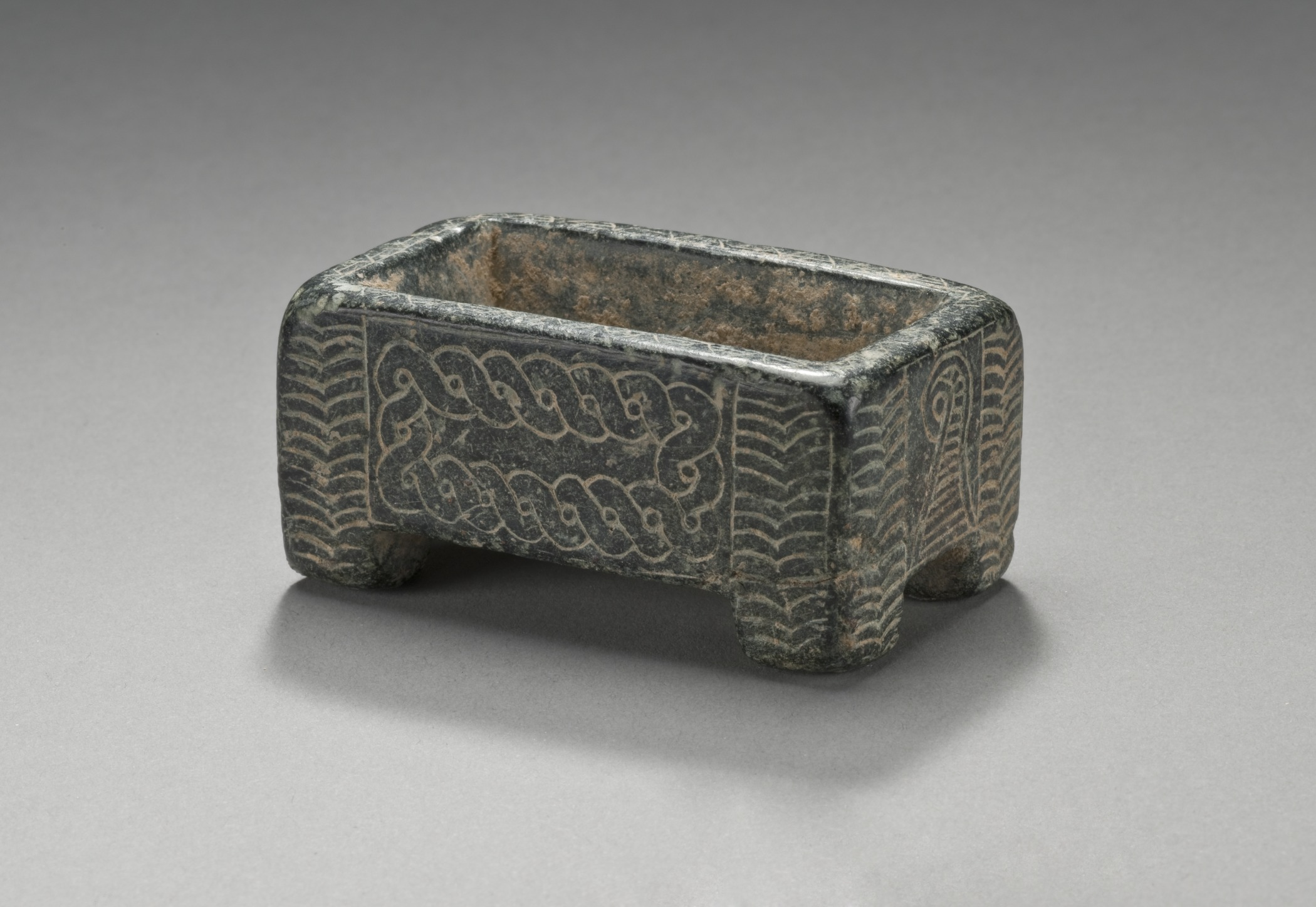
Vessel with guilloche pattern; 2000–1500; chlorite; 3.33 x 6.67 x 3.81 cm; Los Angeles County Museum of Art

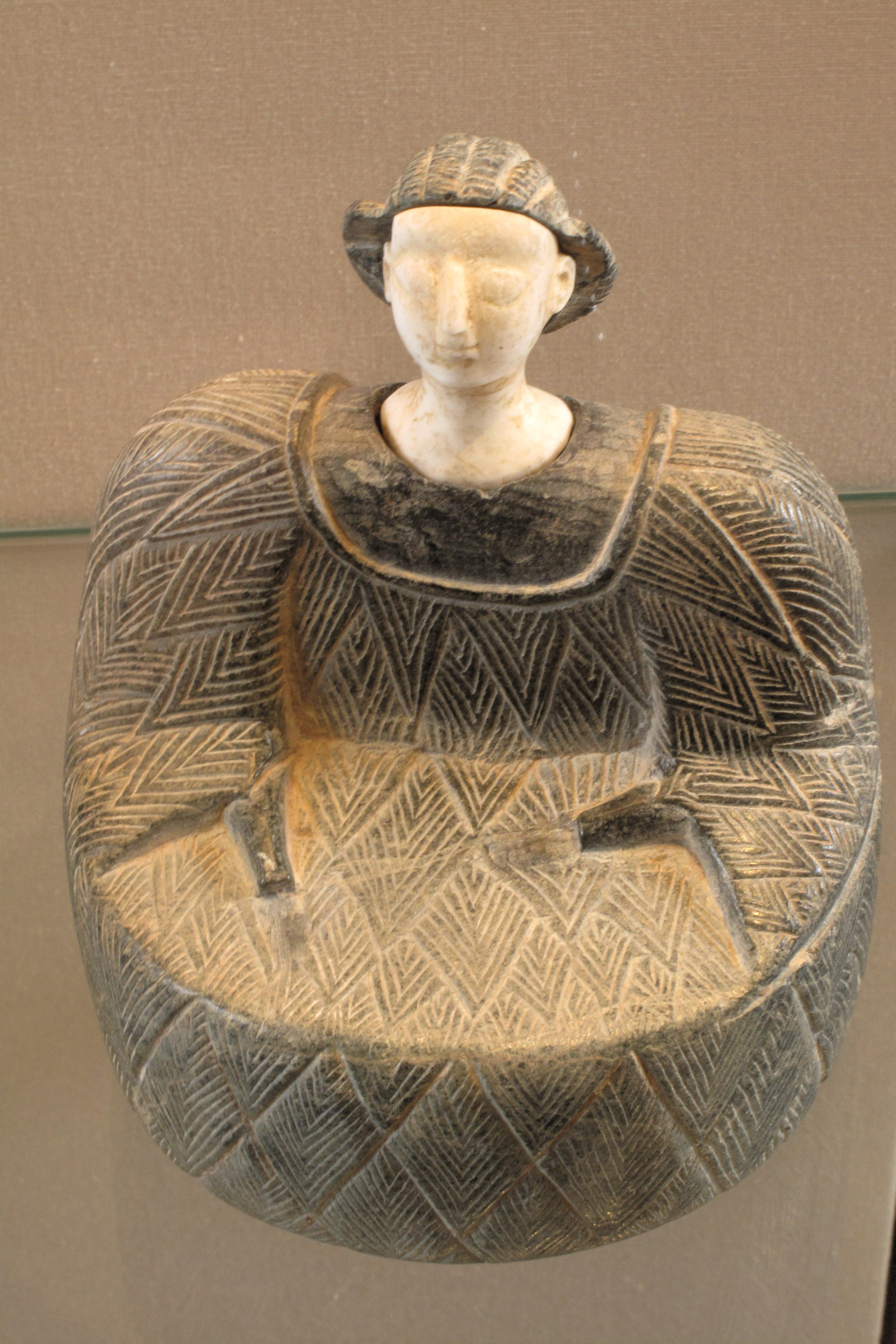
Female figurine of the "Bactrian princess" type; 2nd millennium BC; chlorite and calcite; Louvre

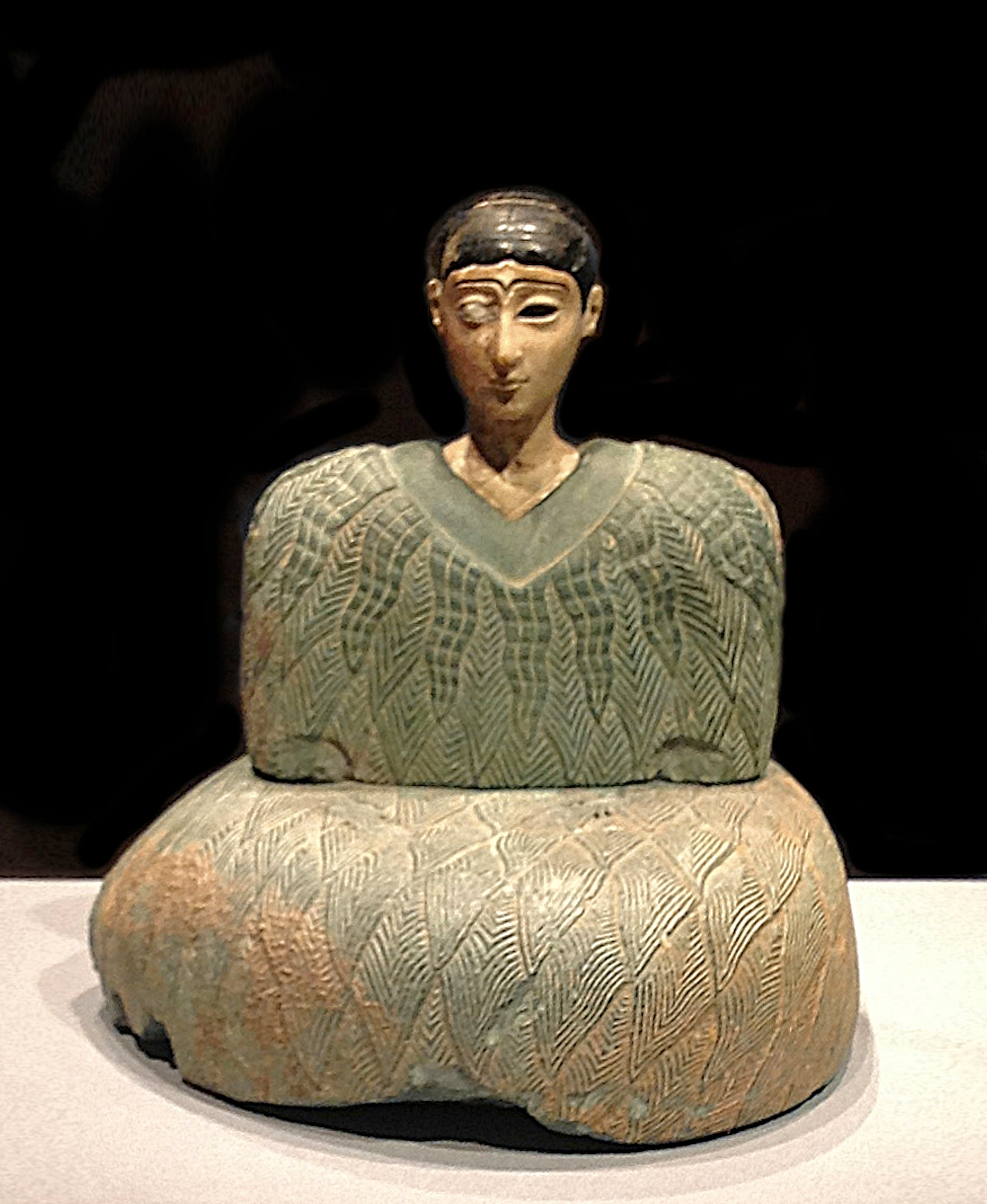
Seated goddess, an example of a "Bactrian princess", Bronze Age Bactria, Bactria–Margiana Archaeological Complex, circa 2000 BC. chlorite and limestone. Central Asian art, Miho Museum, Japan.

=== Architecture ===
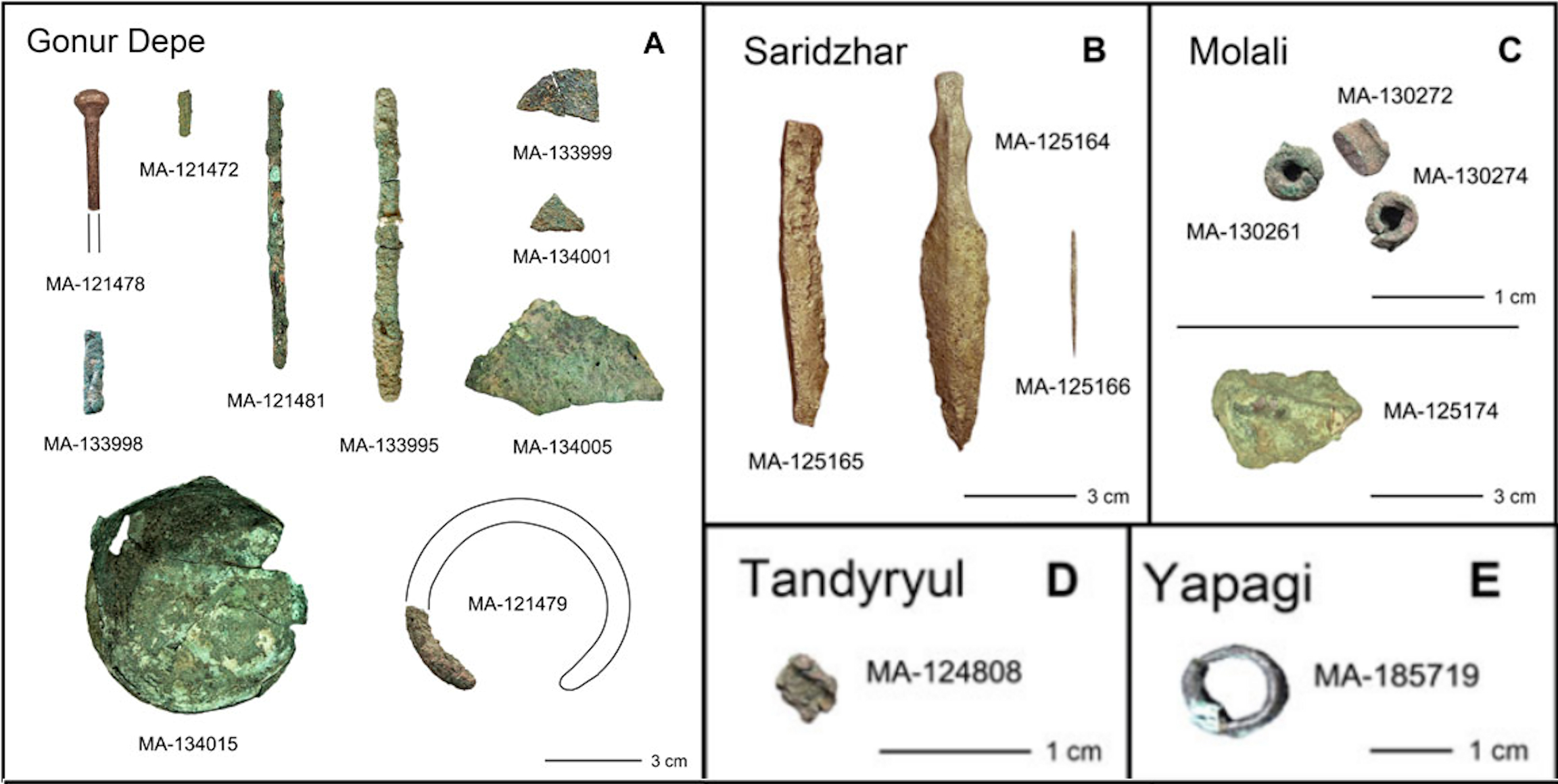
BMAC bronze tools.

Sarianidi regards Gonur Depe as the "capital" of the complex in Margiana throughout the Bronze Age. The palace of north Gonur measures 150 metres by 140 metres, the temple at Togolok 140 metres by 100 metres, the fort at Kelleli 3 125 metres by 125 metres, and the house of a local ruler at Adji Kui 25 metres by 25 metres. Each of these formidable structures has been extensively excavated. While they all have impressive fortification walls, gates, and buttresses, it is not always clear why one structure is identified as a temple and another as a palace. Mallory points out that the BMAC fortified settlements such as Gonur and Togolok resemble the qila, the type of fort known in this region in the historical period. They may be circular or rectangular and have up to three encircling walls. Within the forts are residential quarters, workshops and temples.

The people of the BMAC culture were very proficient at working in a variety of metals including bronze, copper, silver, and gold. This is attested through the many metal artefacts found throughout the sites.

Extensive irrigation systems have been discovered at Geoksyur Oasis.

=== Writing ===
The discovery of a single tiny stone seal (known as the "Anau seal") with geometric markings from the BMAC site at Anau in Turkmenistan in 2000 led some to claim that the Bactria-Margiana complex had also developed writing, and thus may indeed be considered a literate civilisation. It bears five markings which are similar to Chinese "small seal" characters. The only match to the Anau seal is a small jet seal of almost identical shape from Niyä (near modern Minfeng) along the southern Silk Road in Xinjiang, originally thought to be from the Western Han dynasty but now thought to date to 700 BC.

== Archaeological interactions with neighbouring cultures ==
=== Early Bronze Age ===
BMAC materials have been found in the Indus Valley civilisation, on the Iranian Plateau, and in the Persian Gulf. Finds within BMAC sites provide further evidence of trade and cultural contacts. They include an Elamite-type cylinder seal and a Harappan seal stamped with an elephant and Indus script found at Gonur-depe. The relationship between Altyn-Depe and the Indus Valley seems to have been particularly strong. Among the finds there were two Harappan seals and ivory objects. The Harappan settlement of Shortugai in Northern Afghanistan on the banks of the Amu Darya probably served as a trading station.

In the period from the early fourth millennium to the beginning of the second millennium BCE, trade relations with the Khorasan region of Iran are particularly significant. Later in antiquity, this became a part of what is known as the Khurasan Road.

The well known site of Tepe Hissar played a big role in this interaction sphere. Especially in the second half of the fourth millennium (ca 3500-3000 BC), Tepe Hissar became a major site of metalworking, as well as of processing of gemstones, such as lapis lazuli.

According to Neda Moradi (2024),

"Tepe Hissar was part of the so-called "interaction sphere" of Central Asia, spanning from the early fourth millennium to the beginning of the second millennium BCE. This cultural sphere covered a vast area from southern Mesopotamia to the Indus Valley, including Iranian plateau, the Persian Gulf region, Afghanistan, and western Central Asia, where powerful political-economic systems were established around 3500 BCE."

=== Middle Bronze Age ===
The Bactria–Margiana Archaeological Complex (BMAC) and contemporary cultures c. 2000 BC

During the Middle Bronze Age, there is evidence of sustained contact between the BMAC and the Eurasian steppes to the north, intensifying c. 2000 BC. In the delta of the Amu Darya where it reaches the Aral Sea, its waters were channelled for irrigation agriculture by people whose remains resemble those of the nomads of the Andronovo culture. This is interpreted as nomads settling down to agriculture, after contact with the BMAC, known as the Tazabagyab culture. About 1900 BC, the walled BMAC centres decreased sharply in size. Each oasis developed its own types of pottery and other objects. Also pottery of the Tazabagyab-Andronovo culture to the north appeared widely in the Bactrian and Margian countryside. Many BMAC strongholds continued to be occupied and Tazabagyab-Andronovo coarse incised pottery occurs within them (along with the previous BMAC pottery) as well as in pastoral camps outside the mudbrick walls. In the highlands above the Bactrian oases in Tajikistan, kurgan cemeteries of the Vaksh and Bishkent type appeared with pottery that mixed elements of the late BMAC and Tazabagyab-Andronovo traditions. In southern Bactrian sites like Sappali Tepe too, increasing links with the Andronovo culture are seen. During the period 1700 – 1500 BCE, metal artefacts from Sappali Tepe derive from the Tazabagyab-Andronovo culture.

New research in the Murghab region, in excavations at defensive walls of Adji Kui 1, showed pastoralists present, and living on the edge of the town, as early as the second half of the Middle Bronze Age (c. 2210-1960 BC), coexisting with the BMAC population that lived in the 'citadel.'

== Relationship with Indo-Iranians ==
The Bactria–Margiana complex has attracted attention as a candidate for those looking for the material counterparts to the Indo-Iranians. This branch split off from the Proto-Indo-Europeans and is associated with Indo-Iranian languages.

For example, Sarianidi advocated identifying the complex as Indo-Iranian, describing it as the result of a migration from southwestern Iran. Bactria–Margiana material has been found at Susa, Shahdad, and Tepe Yahya in Iran. In contrast, Lamberg-Karlovsky did not see this as evidence that the complex originated in southeastern Iran. "The limited materials of this complex are intrusive in each of the sites on the Iranian Plateau as they are in sites of the Arabian peninsula."

Mallory/Adams (1997) associated the Andronovo, BMAC and Yaz cultures with Indo-Iranian migrations, writing,

It has become increasingly clear that if one wishes to argue for Indo-Iranian migrations from the steppe lands south into the historical seats of the Iranians and Indo-Aryans that these steppe cultures were transformed as they passed through a membrane of Central Asian urbanism. The fact that typical steppe wares are found on BMAC sites and that intrusive BMAC material is subsequently found further to the south in Iran, Afghanistan, Nepal, India and Pakistan, may suggest then the subsequent movement of Indo-Iranian-speakers after they had adopted the culture of the BMAC.

Anthony (2007) sees the culture as begun by farmers in the Neolithic in the Near East, but infiltrated by Indo-Iranian speakers from the Andronovo culture in its late phase, creating a hybrid. In this perspective, the proto-Indo-Aryan language developed within the composite culture before moving south into what is now Iran and then east into the Indian subcontinent.

=== Possible evidence for a BMAC substratum in Indo-Iranian ===
As argued by Michael Witzel and Alexander Lubotsky, there is a proposed substratum in proto-Indo-Iranian that can be plausibly identified with the original language of the BMAC. Moreover, Lubotsky points out a larger number of words borrowed from the same language which are only attested in Indo-Aryan languages and therefore evidence of a substratum in Vedic Sanskrit. He explains this by proposing that Indo-Aryan speakers probably formed the vanguard of the movement into south-central Asia and many of the BMAC loanwords which entered Iranian may have been mediated through Indo-Aryan. Michael Witzel points out that the borrowed vocabulary includes words from agriculture, village and town life, flora and fauna, ritual and religion, so providing evidence for the acculturation of Indo-Iranian speakers into the world of urban civilisation.

=== Horses ===
In excavations at Gonur Depe, at a brick-lined burial pit, grave number 3200 of the Royal necropolis, a horse skeleton was found in period I, dated around 2200 BCE along with a four-wheeled wooden wagon with bronze rims. Archaeologist Julio Bendezu-Sarmiento, mentioning N. A. Dubova's (2015) article, comments that this was an "almost complete skeleton of a foal" resting on the wagon with "wheels circled by bronze bands" and radiocarbon-dated to 2250 BCE. So he considers this horse and the wagon are "one and a half century prior" to similar burials of Sintashta culture. A stone statuette that seems to be a horse with saddle was found in burial number 3210 also in the Royal necropolis and was reported by Sarianidi in 2005, and in burial 3310 parts of a stallion's body were found, the stallion lacked its head, rump, and tail, and was considered as a cult burial of a domestic horse by archaeologist Sarianidi in his 2008 publication.

== Genetics ==
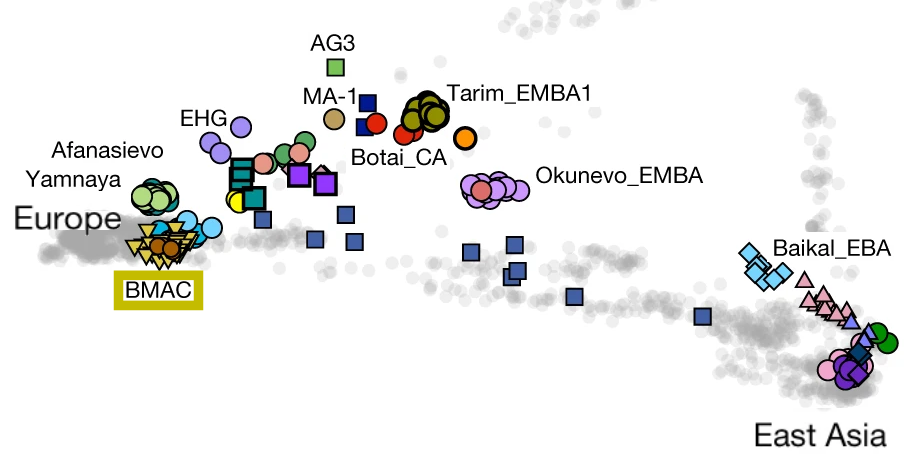
Genetic proximity of the Bactria–Margiana Archaeological Complex ( ) with ancient (colour) and modern (grey) populations. Primary Component Analysis (detail).

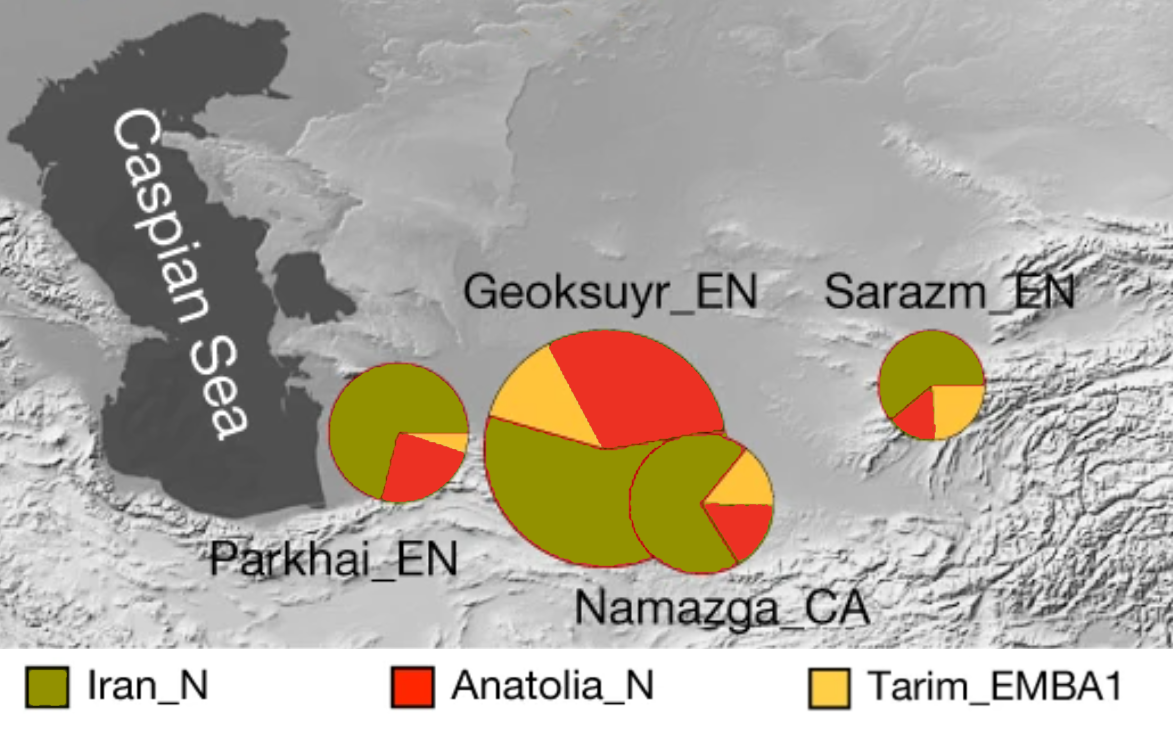
BMAC genetic profiles.

In 2019, Narasimhan and co-authors analysed BMAC skeletons from the Bronze Age sites of Bustan, Dzharkutan, Gonur Tepe, and Sappali Tepe. The BMAC population largely derived from preceding local Copper Age peoples who were in turn related to Neolithic farmers from the Iranian plateau and to a lesser extent early Anatolian farmers, as well as hunter-gatherers from Western Siberia (WSHG). They are inferred to have formed primarily from Iran_N (60–65%) and Anatolia_N (20–25%) ancestries, with the remainder (~10%) being derived from a WSHG-like source. The samples extracted from the BMAC sites did not derive any part of their ancestry from the Yamnaya people, who are associated with Proto-Indo-Europeans, although some peripheral samples did already carry significant Yamnaya-like Western Steppe Herders ancestry, inline with the southwards expansion of Western Steppe Herders from the Sintashta and Andronovo cultures towards Southern Central Asia at c. 2100 BCE. Succeeding cultures, specifically the Yaz culture, was characterised by a combination of BMAC and Yamnaya/WSH ancestries, and associated with early Indo-Iranians. Narasimshan et al. (2019) found no essential genetic contributions from the BMAC in later South Asians, suggesting that the Steppe-related ancestry was mediated via other groups. The male specimens belonged primarily to haplogroup J, specifically J* (3/26), J1 (1/26), J2 (7/26), as well as G (2/26), L (2/26), R2 (3/26), R1b (1/26), R* (2/26), H1a (1/26), P (1/26), Q (1/26), T (1/26) and E1b1b (1/26).

Genetic data on Iron Age samples from modern-day Turkmenistan and Uzbekistan confirm the admixture between local BMAC groups and Andronovo-related populations, at the end of Oxus Civilization. These Southern Central Asian Iron Age population derived around 57% of their ancestry from Western Steppe Herders (Andronovo) and c. 43% from the BMAC culture population. Modern day Tajiks and Yaghnobis were found to be direct descendants of the Bronze and Iron Age Central Asian populations, deriving ancestry from both the Yamnaya-like Western Steppe Herders and BMAC groups, and showing genetic continuity to historical Indo-Iranians. These Iron Age Central Asians also displayed a higher genetic affinity to present-day Europeans than present-day Uzbeks, who harbour an additional component derived from an East Asian-like source "through several admixture events over the past ~2,000 years", absent from Iron Age Uzbeks and modern Europeans. There is minor evidence for matrilocality among BMAC culture populations possibily due to men being away for trade.

== Sites ==
In Afghanistan

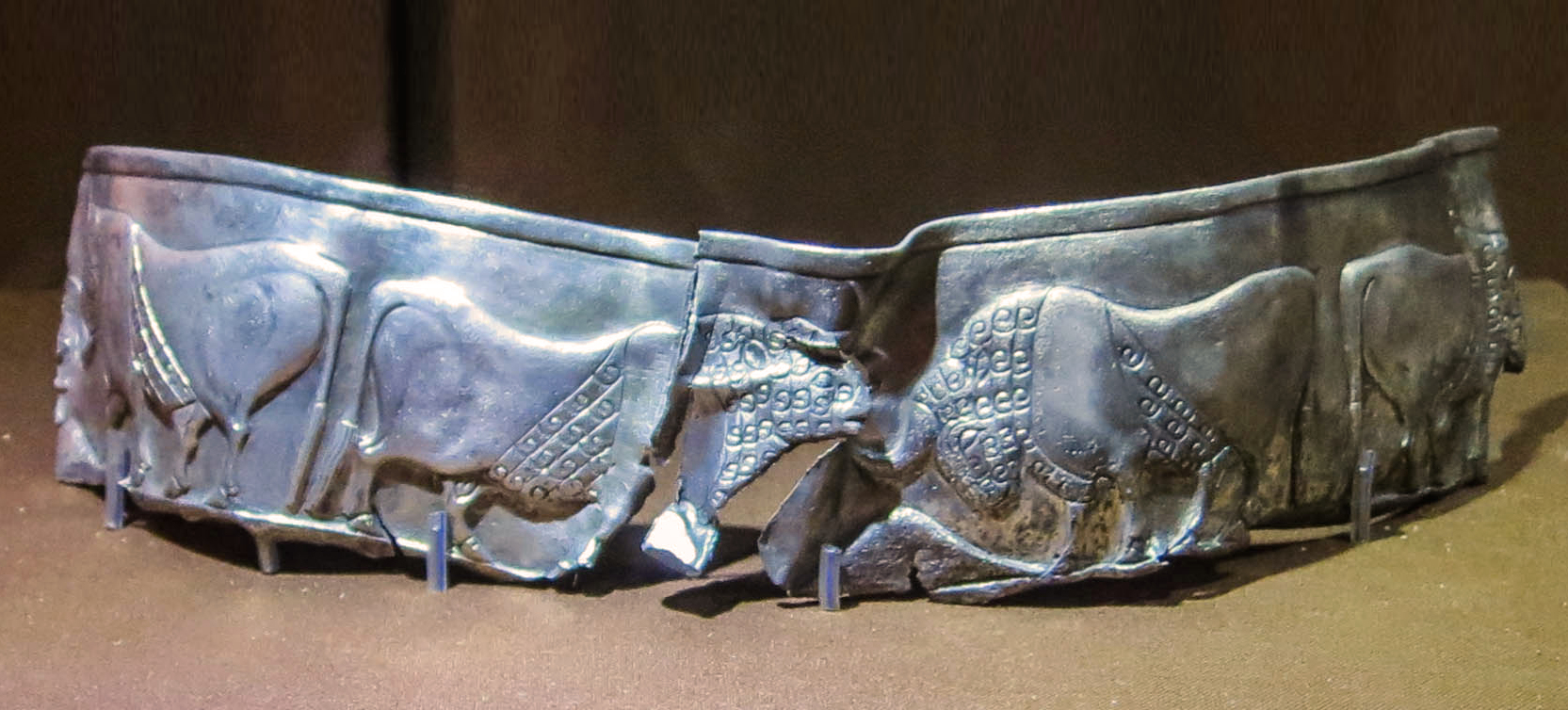
Tepe Fullol bowl fragment, 3rd millennium BCE, National Museum of Afghanistan.

- Dashli, Jowzjan Province
- Khush Tepe (Tepe Fullol)

In Turkmenistan

- Altyndepe
- Gonur Tepe
- Jeitun
- Namazga-Tepe
- Togolok 21
- Ulug Depe
- Berdysyčran-depe

In Uzbekistan

- Ayaz-Kala
- Djarkutan
- Koi Krylgan Kala
- Sappali tepe

In Iran

- Tepe Chalow, Sankhast
- Tepe Kalat-e Yavar, Bojnord
- Shahrak-e Firouzeh, Nishapur
- Razeh Graveyard, Birjand

== See also ==
- Indra
- Soma
- Zoroaster
- Vakhsh culture

== Sources ==
- Francfort, H.P. (1991), "Note on some Bronze Age Petroglyphs of Upper Indus and Central Asia", Pakistan Archaeology, 26: 125–135
- Francfort, H.P. (1994), "The central Asian Dimension of the Symbolic System in Bactria and Margia", Antiquity, vol. 28, no. 259, pp. 406–418
- Kohl, Philip L. (2007). The Making of Bronze Age Eurasia. Cambridge University Press. ISBN 978-1-139-46199-3.
- Mallory, J. P.; Adams, D. Q. (1997). "BMAC". Encyclopedia of Indo-European culture. London: Fitzroy Dearborn. ISBN 1-884964-98-2.
- Parpola, Asko (2015). The Roots of Hinduism: The Early Aryans and the Indus Civilization. Oxford University Press Incorporated. ISBN 978-0-19-022692-3.
