= Gonur Depe =

Early Bronze Age settlement in Turkmenistan

- Goňur depe (Turkmen)
- Location in Turkmenistan Gonur Depe (West and Central Asia)
- 38°12′36″N 62°02′06″E
- Periods: Bronze Age
- Cultures: BMAC

Gonur Depe (Turkmen: Goňur depe) is an archaeological site, dated from 2400 to 1600 BCE, and located about 60 km north of Mary (ancient Merv), Turkmenistan consisting of a large early Bronze Age settlement. It is the "capital" or major settlement of the Bactria–Margiana Archaeological Complex (BMAC).

== Archaeology ==
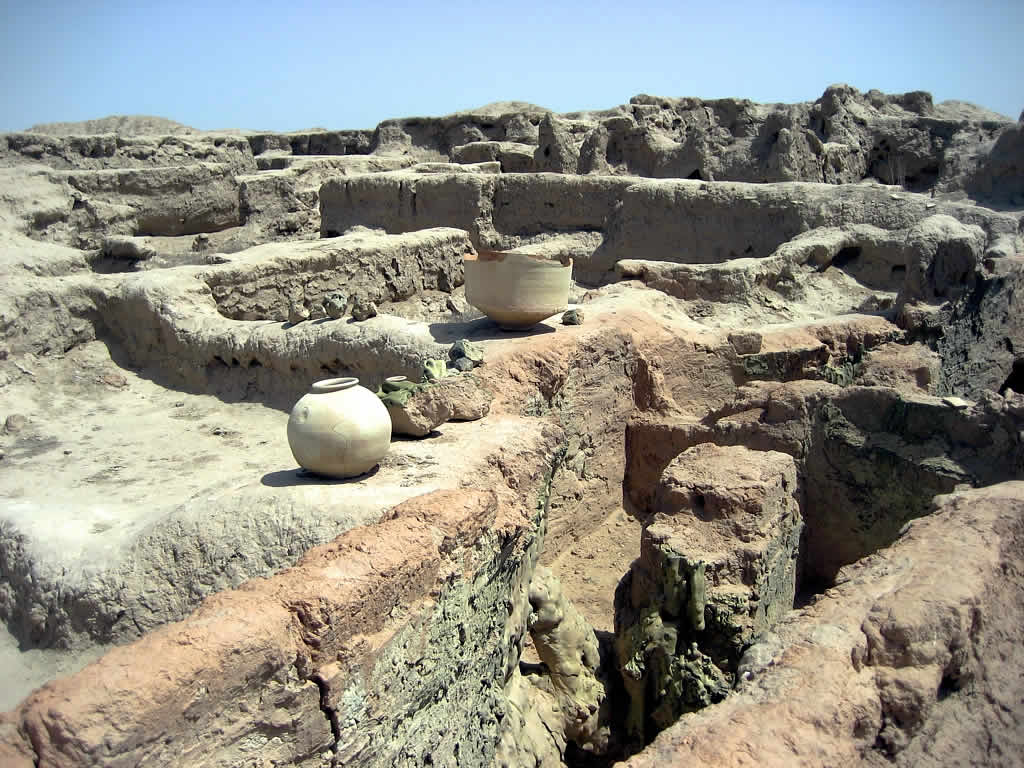
Part of the Gonur Depe ruins, 2011

The site was discovered by Greek-Russian archaeologist Viktor Sarianidi. There he took first pottery shards from surface in 1972, and excavated the site since 1974 to 2013. Sarianidi uncovered a palace, a fortified mud-brick enclosure, and temples with fire altars which he associated with the Zoroastrian religion.

Gonur Depe has a total area of about 55 hectares, and is divided by archaeologists in three main sectors: Gonur North, the Large Necropolis, and Gonur South. The northern part of the complex called Gonur North had a central citadel-like structure about 100 by 180 m (330 by 590 ft) in size.

== Gonur North ==
The main fortified complex is the almost elliptical sector known as Gonur North, (ca. 330 × 460 m), from ca. 2400 to 1900 BCE, which includes the "Monumental Palace" and annexed buildings, ritual areas and many temples, as well as the "Royal Necropolis" and various water reservoirs. The Monumental Palace was at the centre, (ca. 150 x 140 m), and was surrounded by a double wall, featuring two big courtyards and an axial corridor, as well as a large deposit for products, and inner dwellings which could have been a throne room and audience halls. Near the entry of the Monumental Palace, there were water sources connected to ceramic pipes, maybe for visitors' ritual cleansing.

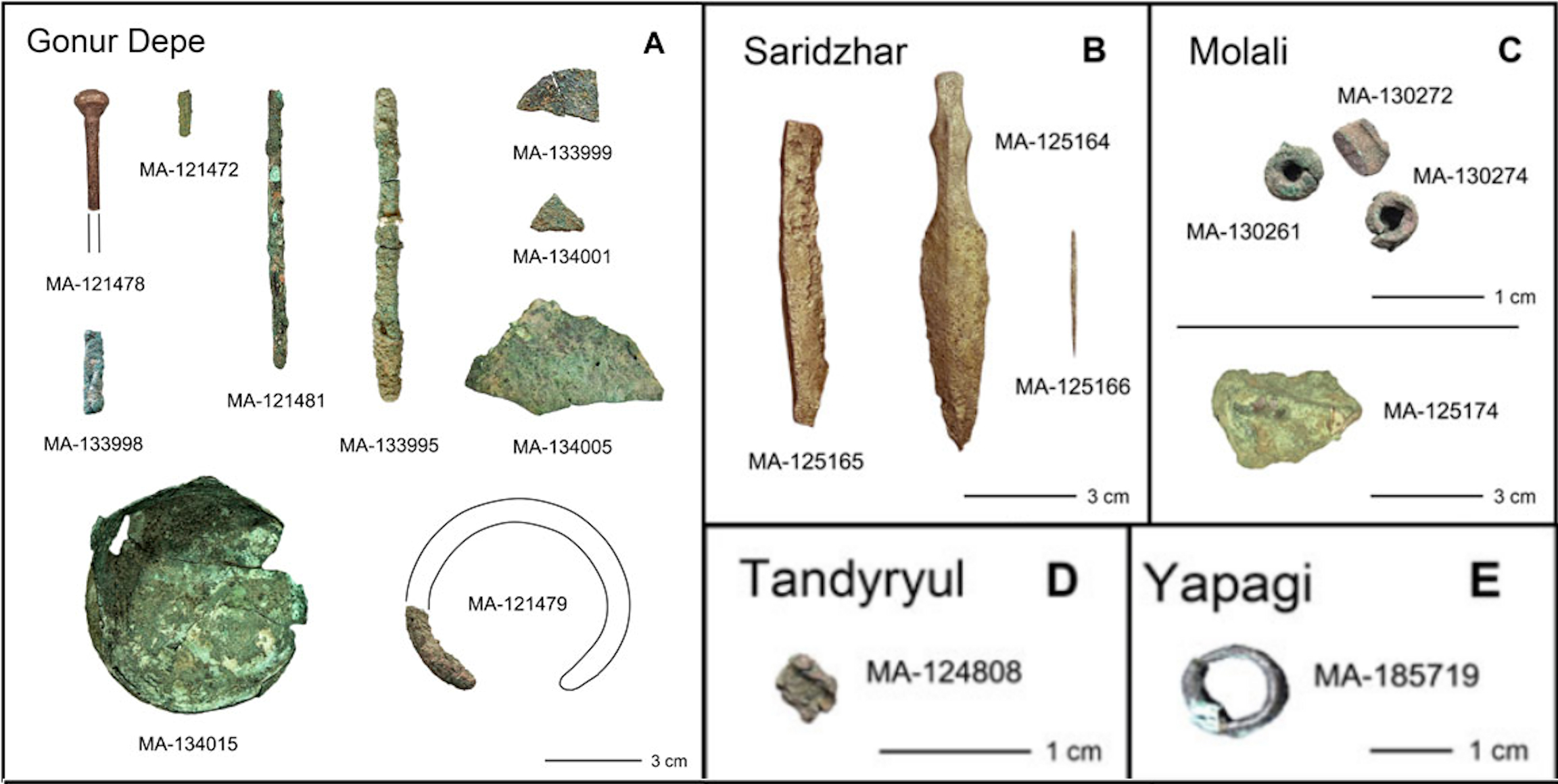
Bronze tools from Gonur Depe and other BMAC sites.

The Royal Necropolis or Royal Graveyard, located to the southeast in Gonur North, consists of eight underground houses for sepulture and three big pits for the same purpose; artefacts of gold, silver, stone, and bronze were found there, showing the high status of the people buried. In the last phase of this necropolis, many objects made of elephant ivory were found, and this level is contemporary to late layers in Altyn Depe in Turkmenistan, and Mohenjo-daro in Pakistan. In excavations at a brick-lined burial pit, grave number 3200 of this Royal necropolis, a horse skeleton was found in period I, dated around 2200 BCE along with a four-wheeled wooden wagon with bronze rims. Archaeologist Julio Bendezu-Sarmiento, mentioning N. A. Dubova's (2015) article, comments that this was an "almost complete skeleton of a foal" resting on the wagon with "wheels circled by bronze bands" and radiocarbon-dated to 2250 BCE. So he considers this horse and the wagon are "one and a half century prior" to similar burials of Sintashta culture. A stone statuette that seems to be a horse with saddle was found in burial number 3210 also in the Royal necropolis and was reported by Sarianidi in 2005, and in burial 3310 parts of a stallion's body were found, the stallion lacked its head, rump, and tail, and was considered as a cult burial of a domestic horse by archaeologist Sarianidi in his 2008 publication.

== The Large Necropolis ==
There is also a Large Necropolis, with more than three thousand graves of many types in an area of ca. 10 hectares, around 200 m west of Gonur North. Only adults and young people over eight years old were buried in this necropolis, children were buried near houses or in abandoned buildings.

In the so-called "tomb of a warrior", number 2380 at this necropolis, a mace head made of bronze and featuring a horse with prominent ears was found.

== Mosaics ==
Numerous mosaics compositions have been discovered in the Necropolis. These were decorating some of the walls, as well as found on many large wooden trunks and boxes that once held rich royal offerings. These mosaics have been dated to the end of the third millennium BC.

Such mosaics are almost unknown elsewhere in ancient East Asia, yet numerous parallels to these Gonur Depe mosaics have been found in Mari, Syria. Other clear parallels are also found in the Royal Cemetery at Ur.

== Gonur South ==
Gonur South is a smaller, square complex, (ca.130 × 120 m), about 1.5 hectares in size, inhabited between ca. 1900 and 1600 BCE, fortified with two series of massive concentric walls featuring round towers in their perimeters. The so-called Temenos, also located in Gonur South, is a parallelogram shrine with strong walls, round towers at the corners, and half-towers in the perimeter, that was considered a Soma-cult-related precinct by archaeologist Sarianidi. Inside the Temenos a small temple designated as "the fort" was built, the shape of the building is cruciform, bearing twelve round towers, one in each angle of the cross, these towers had a narrow door each one. As it is a later development, this "fort" was not finished, but is very similar to the "fire temple" in Tepe Nush-i Jan.

Gonur is among the largest ruins in the Murghab river delta region; over 150 ancient settlements have been found here.

== Chronology of the site ==
Considering the data of early research in Gonur Depe and recent stratigraphic studies, conducted from 2014 to 2018, Robert M. Sataev, Nadezhda A. Dubova, and Muhamed A. Mamedovone mention five periods, or construction horizons, of this settlement:

Phase	Chronology	Features
1	(~2500/2300–2000 BCE)	the foundation of the site until the construction of the palace.
2	(~2000–1900 BCE)	the construction of the palace until the "big fire" in the palace.
3	(~1900–1700 BCE)	the restoration of the palace after the fire till it ceased as a residence of the rulers.
4	(~1700–1600 BCE)	the departure of the rulers and the use of the palace by common members till its desolation.
5	(~1600–1500 BCE)	the desolation of the palace till the abandonment of this territory by the people.

Two sherds in the Geoksjur style of Namazga III period (c. 3200-2800 BCE) were found in Gonur North in the first period of the site, and three radiocarbon samples from Gonur Depe belong to Geoksjur/Sarazm period from narrow walls showing a short-term occupation.

== Genetics ==
Genetic sequencing of individuals from Gonur finds that the majority of their ancestry is similar to Neolithic Farmers from the Iranian Plateau, with minor amounts of Anatolian Neolithic Farmer, and Eastern European Hunter-Gatherer-related ancestry. A number of outliers at the site, while also being of majority Iranian Neolithic related ancestry, also had some South Asian-related ancestry and less Anatolian-related ancestry, possibly as a result of contact with the Indus Valley Civilisation.

== Soma drink ==
Sarianidi found what appears to be the boiler for the ritual drink soma, which is mentioned in the Rigveda and also in the Avesta as haoma. Sarianidi says he also found dishes with traces of cannabis, poppy and ephedra. According to him, this discovery strengthens the theory that these were the ingredients of soma.

The excavations of the settlement of Ulug Tepe, near Dushak in south Turkmenistan, found similar implements for making soma drink, described as a "pressure set". The finds were made in the Late Bronze layers.

The implements,

"... consisted of a huge stone mortar and a pestle, a pressing stone with a half-spheric projection in its centre and next to it a similar one with a half-spheric deepening."

South Turkmenistan also belonged to the area of Bactria-Margiana Archaeological Complex.

== Historical context ==
Scholars believe that the ancient Oxus river culture (Bactria-Margiana) may have its origin at sites like Anau, on the northern slopes of the Kopet-Dag mountains. Anau dates back to 6500 BCE. Later settlements like Gonur may have been founded by people who moved there from the Kopet-Dag area because of changing climate.

There were increasing incursions of nomadic encampments of the Andronovo culture at the site during the period 1800-1500 BCE. According to Lamberg-Karlovsky, the presence at Gonur of Andronovo pottery (the characteristic ceramics of the Eurasian steppes, where the modern horse was domesticated) certainly implies that the horse was known to the BMAC. However, Sarianidi disregards the steppe connection for the presence of the horse in BMAC.

Mallory (1997) points out that the BMAC fortified settlements such as Gonur and Togolok resemble the qila, the type of fort known in this region in the historical period. They may be circular or rectangular and have up to three encircling walls. Within the forts are residential quarters, workshops and temples.

The site was most likely abandoned after the course of the Murghab River shifted to the west.

== See also ==
- Anau, Turkmenistan
