= Togolok =

Bronze age site in Turkmenistan

Coordinates: 38.12°N 62.00°E

- Type: Archaeological site
- Periods: Middle - Late phases of the Bactria–Margiana Archaeological Complex (BMAC) - Greater Khorasan Civilization (GKC)
- Cultures: Indo-Iranian
- Location: Murghab Inner Delta, Turkmenistan

History
- Built: Late 3rd - First half of the 2nd millennium BC

Site notes
- Condition: Ruins

Togolok is an archaeological site in the Murghab Delta, Turkmenistan, located about 10–15 km south of Gonur (or about 40 km north of Mary, Turkmenistan). Togolok 21 is theorized to be an Indo-Iranian temple and fortress dated to the first half of the 2nd millennium BC, belonging to the late phase of the Bactria–Margiana Archaeological Complex (BMAC). Togolok 1 area has also been excavated. Since 2014, the Togolok 1 site has been excavated by the TAP - Togolok Archaeological Project, directed by Barbara Cerasetti (FU Berlin, ISMEO), in collaboration with the University of Bern.

According to the Encyclopedia of Indo-European Culture (page 495), the Togolok temple contained rooms where traces of ephedra and hemp were found along with implements for the preparation of a hallucinogenic beverage (which may be connected to the Hindu drink soma and the Zoroastrian drink haoma).

== Togolok Depe ==
The name 'Togolok' is also applied to another much older site in Turkmenistan known as 'Togolok-tepe'. This settlement started in the Neolithic during the Jeitun period around 7000 BC. It is located in the Kopet-Dagh foothills near the ancient Jeitun settlement. The site has been excavated and published in 1964 in Russian.
