= Djarkutan =

Prehistoric Bactrian proto-urban settlement, in present-day Uzbekistan

- Jarqoʻton (Uzbek)
- Dzharkutan
- Location within West and Central Asia Location within Uzbekistan
- 37°37′44″N 66°57′33″E
- Type: Settlement
- Region: Central Asia

Djarkutan (also Dzharkutan; Uzbek: Jarqoʻton) is a prehistoric proto-urban settlement in Uzbekistan and a center of ancient civilizations in Bactria, the area from which may be the founder of the religion Zarathustra. The settlement on an old stream has two monumental buildings, a potter quarter, a citadel and extensive burial ground. Dzharkutan is located in the west of Surxondaryo Region, in the south of Uzbekistan, about five kilometers southeast of Sherobod and 50 km northwest of Termiz.
