= Ulug Depe =

Ancient Bronze Age site, present-day Turkmenistan

- Ulug depe (Turkmen)
- Location in Turkmenistan Ulug Depe (West and Central Asia)
- 37°9′20.23″N 60°1′46.02″E
- Periods: Bronze Age
- Cultures: BMAC

Ulug Depe is an ancient Bronze Age site in the foothills of the Kopet Dag Mountains in the Karakum Desert of Kaka District (Kaahka) in the Ahal Province of south-eastern Turkmenistan. It covers around 13 hectares and lies on a mound at a height of about 30 meters, displaying the longest stratigraphic sequence of Central Asia, from the Late Neolithic, represented by Jeitun culture, until the pre-Achaemenid period.

== Discoveries ==
Excavations in the Late Bronze layers also found a "pressure set" for making soma drink. This set, similar to those found in Gonur Depe,

"... consisted of a huge stone mortar and a pestle, a pressing stone with a half-spheric projection in its centre, and next to it a similar one with a half-spheric deepening."

== See also ==
- Yaz culture
- Bactria–Margiana Archaeological Complex (BMAC)
