= Bar Rud =

Bar Rud or Barrud (Persian: بررود) may refer to:

- Bar Rud, Ahmadi, Hormozgan province
- Barrud, Fareghan, Hormozgan province
- Bar Rud, Razavi Khorasan
- Bar Rud, Fariman, Razavi Khorasan province
- Barrud District, in Razavi Khorasan province
- Barrud Rural District, in Razavi Khorasan province
