= 2014 Yunnan earthquake =

2014 Yunnan earthquake may refer to one of three different earthquakes in Yunnan Province, China:

- 2014 Yingjiang earthquake, a 5.6 M_{w} earthquake in Yingjiang County which occurred in May
- 2014 Ludian earthquake, a 6.1 M_{w} earthquake which occurred in Ludian County in early August
- 2014 Jinggu earthquake, a 6.1 M_{w} earthquake which occurred in Jinggu County in early October

== See also ==
- List of earthquakes in 2014
- List of earthquakes in China
