= Kash Rudkhaneh =

Kash Rudkhaneh كشرودخانه
- Village
- Location within Iran
- Coordinates: 28°03′26″N 56°20′04″E
- Country: Iran
- Province: Hormozgan
- County: Hajjiabad
- Bakhsh: Fareghan
- Rural District: Fareghan

Population (2006)
  - Total: 281
- Time zone: UTC+3:30 (IRST)
  - Summer (DST): UTC+4:30 (IRDT)

Kash Rudkhaneh (Persian: كشرودخانه, also Romanized as Kash Rūdkhāneh, Kash-e Rūdkhāneh, and Kash Roodkhaneh; also known as Kash-e Rūdkhāneh-ye Qadd, Kash Rūdkhāneh Qad, Kesh Rūdkhāneh-ye Qadd, Rūdkhāneh, and Rūposhteh) is a village in Fareghan Rural District, Fareghan District, Hajjiabad County, Hormozgan Province, Iran. At the 2006 census, its population was 281, in 68 families.
