= Band-e Kuh =

Band-e Kuh بندكوه
- Village
- Location within Iran
- Coordinates: 28°02′24″N 56°16′48″E
- Country: Iran
- Province: Hormozgan
- County: Hajjiabad
- Bakhsh: Fareghan
- Rural District: Fareghan

Population (2006)
  - Total: 26
- Time zone: UTC+3:30 (IRST)
  - Summer (DST): UTC+4:30 (IRDT)

Band-e Kuh (Persian: بندكوه, also Romanized as Band-e Kūh; also known as Bandi-ye Kūh) is a village in Fareghan Rural District, Fareghan District, Hajjiabad County, Hormozgan Province, Iran. At the 2006 census, its population was 26, in 9 families.
