= Mazraeh =

Mazraeh (Persian: مزرعه) may refer to:

== East Azerbaijan Province ==
- Mazraeh, Ahar, a village in Ahar County
- Mazraeh, Shabestar, a village in Shabestar County
- Mazraeh, Varzaqan, a village in Varzaqan County

== Fars Province ==
- Mazraeh, Abadeh, a village in Abadeh County
- Mazraeh, Neyriz, a village in Neyriz County

== Golestan Province ==
- Mazraeh, Golestan
- Mazraeh-ye Jonubi Rural District
- Mazraeh-ye Shomali Rural District

== Hamadan Province ==
- Mazraeh, Hamadan
- Mazraeh, Kabudarahang, Hamadan Province
- Mazraeh, Razan, Hamadan Province

== Hormozgan Province ==
- Mazraeh, Hormozgan

== Isfahan Province ==
- Mazraeh, Isfahan

== Khuzestan Province ==
- Mazraeh, Khuzestan
- Mazraeh, Shush, Khuzestan province
- Mazraeh-ye Yek, a village in Karkheh County, Khuzestan province

== Markazi Province ==
- Mazraeh, Khomeyn, a village in Khomeyn County
- Mazraeh, Shazand, a village in Shazand County

== Qazvin Province ==
- Mazraeh, Qazvin

== West Azerbaijan Province ==
- Mazraeh, Chaldoran, a village in Chaldoran County
- Mazraeh, Sardasht, a village in Sardasht County
- Mazraeh, Vazineh, a village in Sardasht County

== Yazd Province ==
- Mazraeh, Yazd

== See also ==
- Mazraeh is a common element in Iranian place names; see.
