= Bokhvan =

Bokhvan بخوان
- Village
- Location within Iran
- Coordinates: 27°57′21″N 56°15′04″E
- Country: Iran
- Province: Hormozgan
- County: Hajjiabad
- Bakhsh: Fareghan
- Rural District: Fareghan

Population (2006)
  - Total: 205
- Time zone: UTC+3:30 (IRST)
  - Summer (DST): UTC+4:30 (IRDT)

Bokhvan (Persian: بخوان, also Romanized as Bokhvān) is a village in Fareghan Rural District, Fareghan District, Hajjiabad County, Hormozgan Province, Iran. At the 2006 census, its population was 205, in 60 families.
