= Dahaneh-ye Meymand =

Dahaneh-ye Meymand دهنه ميمند
- Village
- Location within Iran
- Coordinates: 27°57′58″N 56°20′09″E
- Country: Iran
- Province: Hormozgan
- County: Hajjiabad
- Bakhsh: Fareghan
- Rural District: Fareghan

Population (2006)
  - Total: 203
- Time zone: UTC+3:30 (IRST)
  - Summer (DST): UTC+4:30 (IRDT)

Dahaneh-ye Meymand (Persian: دهنه ميمند, also Romanized as Dahaneh-ye Meymand; also known as Sar Dahaneh-ye Meymand) is a village in Fareghan Rural District, Fareghan District, Hajjiabad County, Hormozgan Province, Iran. At the 2006 census, its population was 203, in 58 families.
