= Nesa, Hormozgan =

Nesa نسا
- Village
- Location within Iran
- Coordinates: 28°04′47″N 56°22′37″E
- Country: Iran
- Province: Hormozgan
- County: Hajjiabad
- Bakhsh: Fareghan
- Rural District: Fareghan

Population (2006)
  - Total: 123
- Time zone: UTC+3:30 (IRST)
  - Summer (DST): UTC+4:30 (IRDT)

Nesa (Persian: نسا, also Romanized as Nesā’; also known as Neyseh and Nīsa) is a village in Fareghan Rural District, Fareghan District, Hajjiabad County, Hormozgan Province, Iran. At the 2006 census, its population was 123, in 26 families.
