= Netamabad =

Netamabad نطام اباد
- Village
- Location within Iran
- Coordinates: 28°01′54″N 56°20′38″E
- Country: Iran
- Province: Hormozgan
- County: Hajjiabad
- Bakhsh: Fareghan
- Rural District: Fareghan

Population (2006)
  - Total: 127
- Time zone: UTC+3:30 (IRST)
  - Summer (DST): UTC+4:30 (IRDT)

Netamabad (Persian: نطام اباد, also Romanized as Neṭāmābād; also known as Nez̧āmābād, Nez̧āmābād-e Fāreghān, Nez̧āmābād Fāreghān, and Nizāmābād) is a village in Fareghan Rural District, Fareghan District, Hajjiabad County, Hormozgan Province, Iran. At the 2006 census, its population was 127, in 31 families.
