= Narmand =

Narmand (Persian: نارمند) may refer to:

- Narmand, Hormozgan
- Narmand, Kerman
