= Siahak =

Siahak سياهك
- Village
- Location within Iran
- Coordinates: 28°00′39″N 56°00′00″E
- Country: Iran
- Province: Hormozgan
- County: Hajjiabad
- Bakhsh: Fareghan
- Rural District: Ashkara

Population (2006)
  - Total: 361
- Time zone: UTC+3:30 (IRST)
  - Summer (DST): UTC+4:30 (IRDT)

Siahak (Persian: سياهك, also Romanized as Sīāhak) is a village in Ashkara Rural District, Fareghan District, Hajjiabad County, Hormozgan Province, Iran. At the 2006 census, its population was 361, in 104 families.
