= Meymand (disambiguation) =

Meymand is a city in Fars Province, Iran.

Meymand (Persian: ميمند) may also refer to:

- Meymand, Ardabil
- Meymand, Hormozgan
- Meymand, Kerman
- Meymand, Kohgiluyeh and Boyer-Ahmad
- Meymand, Razavi Khorasan
- Meymand Rural District, in Kerman Province
- Meymand, Ghazni in Ghazni Province
