= Siruiyeh =

Siruiyeh or Siruyeh (Persian: سيروييه) may refer to:

- Siruiyeh, Hormozgan
- Siruiyeh, Kerman
