= Rahimabad, Hormozgan =

Village in Hajjiabad County, Iran

Rahimabad رحيم اباد
- Village
- Location within Iran
- Coordinates: 28°03′04″N 56°20′37″E
- Country: Iran
- Province: Hormozgan
- County: Hajjiabad
- Bakhsh: Fareghan
- Rural District: Fareghan

Population (2006)
  - Total: 180
- Time zone: UTC+3:30 (IRST)
  - Summer (DST): UTC+4:30 (IRDT)

Rahimabad (Persian: رحيم اباد, also Romanized as Raḩīmābād) is a village located in Fareghan Rural District, within Fareghan District of Hajjiabad County, Hormozgan Province, Iran. According to the 2006 census, the village had a population of 180, comprising 44 families.
