= Iquique earthquake =

Iquique earthquake may refer to:

- 1877 Iquique earthquake
- 2014 Iquique earthquake
