= Narmand, Hormozgan =

Narmand نارمند
- Village
- Location within Iran
- Coordinates: 27°57′45″N 56°20′44″E
- Country: Iran
- Province: Hormozgan
- County: Hajjiabad
- Bakhsh: Fareghan
- Rural District: Fareghan

Population (2006)
  - Total: 129
- Time zone: UTC+3:30 (IRST)
  - Summer (DST): UTC+4:30 (IRDT)

Narmand (Persian: نارمند, also Romanized as Nārmand) is a village in Fareghan Rural District, Fareghan District, Hajjiabad County, Hormozgan Province, Iran. At the 2006 census, its population was 129, in 41 families.
