= Shamil-e Bala =

Village in Hormozgan province, Iran

Shamil-e Bala Persian: شمیل بالا
- Village
- Location within Iran
- Coordinates: 28°08′41″N 56°05′33″E
- Country: Iran
- Province: Hormozgan
- County: Hajjiabad
- District: Fareghan
- Rural District: Ashkara

Population (2016)
  - Total: 3,028
- Time zone: UTC+3:30 (IRST)

Shamil-e Bala (Persian: شمیل بالا) (Note: Also romanized as Shamīl-e Bālā) is a village in, and the capital of, Ashkara Rural District of Fareghan District, Hajjiabad County, Hormozgan province, Iran.

== Demographics ==
=== Population ===
At the time of the 2006 National Census, the village's population was 2,411 in 564 households. The following census in 2011 counted 3,392 people in 895 households. The 2016 census measured the population of the village as 3,028 people in 921 households. It was the most populous village in its rural district.
