= Shahrud (disambiguation) =

Shahrud is a musical instrument.

Shahrud may also refer to:

- Shahrud, Iran, a city in Semnan Province, Iran
- Shahrud County, an administrative subdivision of Semnan Province, Iran
- Shahrud District, an administrative subdivision of Ardabil Province, Iran
- Shahrud Rural District, an administrative subdivision of Ardabil Province, Iran
- Shahrud, Hormozgan, a village in Hormozgan Province, Iran
- Shahrud, Lorestan, a village in Lorestan Province, Iran
- Shahrood (River), a river in northern Iran
