= Meymand, Hormozgan =

Meymand ميمند
- Village
- Location within Iran
- Coordinates: 28°00′34″N 56°19′34″E
- Country: Iran
- Province: Hormozgan
- County: Hajjiabad
- Bakhsh: Fareghan
- Rural District: Fareghan

Population (2006)
  - Total: 371
- Time zone: UTC+3:30 (IRST)
  - Summer (DST): UTC+4:30 (IRDT)

Meymand (Persian: ميمند) is a village in Fareghan Rural District, Fareghan District, Hajjiabad County, Hormozgan Province, Iran. At the 2006 census, its population was 371, in 108 families.
