= Barrud, Fareghan =

Barrud بررود
- Village
- Location within Iran
- Coordinates: 27°58′00″N 56°06′04″E
- Country: Iran
- Province: Hormozgan
- County: Hajjiabad
- Bakhsh: Fareghan
- Rural District: Ashkara

Population (2006)
  - Total: 44
- Time zone: UTC+3:30 (IRST)
  - Summer (DST): UTC+4:30 (IRDT)

Barrud (Persian: بررود, also Romanized as Barrūd) is a village in Ashkara Rural District, Fareghan District, Hajjiabad County, Hormozgan Province, Iran. At the 2006 census, its population was 44, in 10 families.
