= Sirmand =

Sirmand سيرمند
- Village
- Location within Iran
- Coordinates: 27°58′47″N 56°06′55″E
- Country: Iran
- Province: Hormozgan
- County: Hajjiabad
- Bakhsh: Fareghan
- Rural District: Ashkara

Population (2006)
  - Total: 665
- Time zone: UTC+3:30 (IRST)
  - Summer (DST): UTC+4:30 (IRDT)

Sirmand (Persian: سيرمند, also Romanized as Sīrmand; also known as Qal‘eh-ye Sarmad, Sarmahd, and Sīmand) is a village in Ashkara Rural District, Fareghan District, Hajjiabad County, Hormozgan Province, Iran. At the 2006 census, its population was 665, in 168 families.
