= Mazraeh, Hormozgan =

Mazraeh مزرعه
- Village
- Location within Iran
- Coordinates: 28°02′32″N 56°17′11″E
- Country: Iran
- Province: Hormozgan
- County: Hajjiabad
- Bakhsh: Fareghan
- Rural District: Fareghan

Population (2006)
  - Total: 506
- Time zone: UTC+3:30 (IRST)
  - Summer (DST): UTC+4:30 (IRDT)

Mazraeh (Persian: مزرعه, also Romanized as Mazra‘eh; also known as Mazra‘eh Farghan) is a village in Fareghan Rural District, Fareghan District, Hajjiabad County, Hormozgan Province, Iran. At the 2006 census, its population was 506, in 120 families.
