= October 2014 Nicaragua earthquake =

Earthquake in Central America

- Location within Central America
- UTC time: 2014-10-14 03:51:34
- ISC event: 610573069
- USGS-ANSS: ComCat
- Local date: October 13, 2014
- Local time: 21:51
- Magnitude: 7.3 M_{w}
- Depth: 40 kilometres (25 mi)
- Epicenter: 12.576°N 88.046°W
- Areas affected: Nicaragua, Honduras, El Salvador
- Max. intensity: MMI VII (Very strong)
- Casualties: 4 dead, several injured

The October 2014 Nicaragua earthquake occurred at 21:51 local time with a moment magnitude of 7.3 off the coast of Nicaragua, Honduras and El Salvador. The shock caused four deaths and several injuries.

== Impact ==
A homeless man sleeping on a sidewalk died when a power line fell on him. Two others died from heart-attacks, in San Miguel and Santiago de María. In San Miguel, around 31 buildings, including five schools collapsed or were damaged, five of which were in San Salvador. One of the city's hospitals was also damaged. There was also major damage to buildings in the Department of Usulután, particularly the municipalities of Berlín and Alegría, where several buildings partially collapsed. The roads to the regional capital were partially blocked by landslides. Some damage was also reported in León, Nicaragua, where a church and over 2,000 homes were damaged in Quezalguaque, and 37 buildings collapsed. Some hospitals there had to be evacuated. Power outages and several injuries were also reported in Honduras, where one person died of a heart attack in Choluteca. Several people were taken to hospitals with nervous breakdowns.

== See also ==
- List of earthquakes in 2014
- List of earthquakes in Nicaragua
