= 2014 Yingjiang earthquake =

Earthquake in China

- Location within Yunnan
- UTC time: 2014-05-23 20:49:21
- ISC event: 604653261
- USGS-ANSS: ComCat
- Local date: 24 May 2014
- Local time: 04:49
- Magnitude: 5.6 M_{w}
- Depth: 12.0 kilometres (7 mi)
- Epicenter: 25.0°N 97.8°E (Yingjiang County, Yunnan Province)
- Areas affected: China
- Total damage: 367 million CNY
- Max. intensity: MMI VII (Very strong)
- Casualties: 15 injured

The 2014 Yingjiang earthquake occurred on 24 May at 4:49 a.m. local time in Yingjiang County, Yunnan Province, China, with a moment magnitude of 5.6 and a maximum perceived intensity of VII (Very strong) on the Mercalli intensity scale. The epicenter was in the town of Kachang. There were 14 aftershocks, according to the Yunnan provincial seismological bureau.

The earthquake affected about 23,800 people and destroyed 9,412 homes. More than 8,000 people were evacuated and a power outage occurred around the epicenter. The Yunnan region is seismically active, lying within the complex zone of deformation caused by the ongoing collision between the Eurasian plate and Indian plate.

== Relief ==
Three relocation sites were set up for 8,465 displaced residents. The provincial seismological bureau dispatched a work team of 50 people for surveying, investigation and disaster assessment. The Yunnan Provincial Civil Affairs Department sent 1,600 tents, 2,000 quilts and 1,000 folding beds to affected areas.

== See also ==
- List of earthquakes in 2014
- List of earthquakes in China
- List of earthquakes in Myanmar
