= List of earthquakes in 2014 =

Earthquakes in 2014
Approximate epicenters of notable earthquakes in 2014
- 4.0–5.9 magnitude
- 6.0–6.9 magnitude
- 7.0–7.9 magnitude
- 8.0+ magnitude
- Strongest: 8.2 M_{w} Chile
- Deadliest: 6.2 (China) China; 729 deaths
- Total fatalities: 804

Number by magnitude
- 9.0+: 0
- 8.0–8.9: 1
- 7.0–7.9: 11
- 6.0–6.9: 144
- 5.0–5.9: 1,577
- 4.0–4.9: 14,941

This is a list of earthquakes in 2014. Only earthquakes of magnitude 6 or above are included, unless they result in damage and/or casualties, or are notable for some other reason. All dates are listed according to UTC time. Death toll was relatively low this year, and most of casualties came from China in August. The only 8 magnitude earthquake struck Chile.

== Compared to other years ==
Number of earthquakes worldwide for 2004–2014 []
| Magnitude | 2004 | 2005 | 2006 | 2007 | 2008 | 2009 | 2010 | 2011 | 2012 | 2013 | 2014 |
|---|---|---|---|---|---|---|---|---|---|---|---|
| 8.0–9.9 | 2 | 1 | 2 | 4 | 1 | 1 | 1 | 1 | 2 | 2 | 1 |
| 7.0–7.9 | 14 | 10 | 9 | 14 | 12 | 16 | 23 | 19 | 15 | 17 | 11 |
| 6.0–6.9 | 141 | 139 | 142 | 178 | 167 | 143 | 150 | 187 | 117 | 123 | 143 |
| 5.0–5.9 | 1,511 | 1,694 | 1,726 | 2,090 | 1,786 | 1,912 | 2,222 | 2,494 | 1,565 | 1,469 | 1,594 |
| 4.0–4.9 | 10,880 | 13,893 | 12,843 | 12,081 | 12,294 | 6,817 | 10,135 | 13,130 | 10,955 | 11,877 | 15,817 |
| Total | 12,551 | 15,738 | 14,723 | 14,367 | 14,261 | 8,891 | 12,536 | 15,831 | 12,660 | 13,491 | 17,573 |

== Overall ==
=== By death toll ===
| Rank | Death toll | Magnitude | Location | Depth (km) | MMI | Date |
|---|---|---|---|---|---|---|
| 1 | 617 | 6.2 | China, Yunnan | 10.0 | IX (Violent) | August 3 |
| 2 | 11 | 8.2 | Chile, Tarapacá offshore | 25.0 | VIII (Severe) | April 1 |

- Note: At least 10 dead

=== By magnitude ===
| Rank | Magnitude | Death toll | Location | Depth (km) | MMI | Date |
|---|---|---|---|---|---|---|
| 1 | 8.2 | 11 | Chile, Tarapacá offshore | 25.0 | VIII | April 1 |
| 2 | 7.9 | 0 | United States, Alaska, Aleutian Islands offshore | 107.5 | VIII | June 23 |
| 3 | 7.7 | 0 | Chile, Tarapacá offshore | 31.1 | IX | April 3 |
| 4 | 7.6 | 0 | Solomon Islands, Makira offshore | 29.3 | VII | April 12 |
| 5 | 7.5 | 0 | Papua New Guinea, Bougainville offshore | 30.9 | VII | April 19 |
| 6 | 7.4 | 0 | Solomon Islands, Makira offshore | 35.0 | VII | April 13 |
| 7 | 7.3 | 4 | Nicaragua, Chinandega offshore | 40.0 | VII | October 14 |
| 8 | 7.2 | 0 | Mexico, Guerrero | 24.0 | VII | April 18 |
| 9 | 7.1 | 1 | Papua New Guinea, Bougainville offshore | 50.0 | VII | April 11 |
| 9 | 7.1 | 0 | Easter Island, Chile | 10.0 | I | October 8 |
| 9 | 7.1 | 0 | Fiji offshore | 434.4 | VI | November 1 |
| 9 | 7.1 | 0 | Indonesia, offshore Molucca Sea | 35.0 | VI | November 15 |

- Note: At least 7.0 magnitude

== By month ==
=== January ===
January
- Strongest: 6.5 M_{w}, Vanuatu
- Deadliest: 5.2 M_{w}, Iran; 1 death
- Total fatalities: 1

Number by magnitude
- 8.0–8.9: 0
- 7.0–7.9: 0
- 6.0–6.9: 6
- 5.0–5.9: 106
- 4.0–4.9: 1237

- A magnitude 6.5 earthquake struck 32 km (20 mi) west of Sola, Vanuatu on January 1 at a depth of 187.0 km (116.2 mi).
- A magnitude 5.2 earthquake struck 60 km (37 mi) south of Lar, Iran on January 2 at a depth of 8.0 km (5.0 mi). One person killed, 30 others injured, 40 homes destroyed and 100 others damaged in the Bastak area.
- A magnitude 5.5 earthquake struck 10 km (6.2 mi) south of Sipí, Colombia on January 4 at a depth of 53.9 km (33.5 mi). At least 121 homes damaged in the Sipí area.
- A magnitude 6.4 earthquake struck 61 km (38 mi) north of Hatillo, Puerto Rico on January 13 at a depth of a 20.0 km (12.4 mi). Minor damage occurred in the epicentral area and power outages occurred in Bayamon.
- A magnitude 6.1 earthquake struck 35 km (22 mi) north northeast of Masterton, New Zealand on January 20 at a depth of 28.0 km (17.4 mi).
- A magnitude 6.1 earthquake struck Tonga 133 km (83 mi) northwest of Hihifo on January 21 at a depth of 6.1 km (3.8 mi).
- A magnitude 6.1 earthquake struck 38 km (24 mi) south southeast of Adipala, Central Java, Indonesia on January 25 at a depth of 66.0 km (41.0 mi). Two people were injured and seventeen buildings, including two mosques collapsed, while 93 others were damaged.
- A magnitude 6.1 earthquake struck Greece 1 km (0.62 mi) east northeast of Lixouri on January 26 at a depth of 8.0 km (5.0 mi). Seven people suffered injuries and minor damage, as well as landslides were reported in the epicentral area. Water supplies were heavily affected in Cephalonia.

=== February ===
February
- Strongest: 6.9 M_{w} China
- Total fatalities: 0

Number by magnitude
- 8.0–8.9: 0
- 7.0–7.9: 0
- 6.0–6.9: 8
- 5.0–5.9: 101
- 4.0–4.9: 1037

- A magnitude 6.1 earthquake struck South Georgia and the South Sandwich Islands 16 km (9.9 mi) south southwest of Visokoi Island on February 1 at a depth of 130.0 km (80.8 mi).
- A magnitude 5.3 earthquake struck the Iran 88 km (55 mi) southeast of Minab, Iran on February 2 at a depth of 10.0 km (6.2 mi). Many buildings damaged and telephone services disrupted in the Gowharan area.
- A magnitude 6.5 earthquake struck the Kermadec Islands 189 km (117 mi) south southeast of L'Esperance Rock, New Zealand on February 2 at a depth of 44.3 km (27.5 mi).
- A magnitude 6.0 earthquake struck Greece 7 km (4.3 mi) north northwest of Lixouri on February 3 at a depth of 5.0 km (3.1 mi). Sixteen people were injured, additional damage, power outages and rockfalls occurred in the epicentral area.
- A magnitude 6.5 earthquake struck Vanuatu 34 km (21 mi) east of Port Olry on February 7 at a depth of 122.0 km (75.8 mi).
- A magnitude 6.0 earthquake struck 122 km (76 mi) west northwest of Panguna, Papua New Guinea on February 9 at a depth of 41.8 km (26.0 mi).
- A magnitude 6.9 earthquake struck 272 km (169 mi) east southeast of Hotan, Xinjiang, China on February 12 at a depth of 10.0 km (6.2 mi). Over 68,340 houses collapsed, with 168,468 others damaged, some severely. 497 bridges were also damaged, and over 11,000 livestock were killed, but no human casualties were reported.
- A magnitude 6.5 earthquake struck Barbados 172 km (107 mi) north northeast of Bathsheba on February 18 at a depth of 14.8 km (9.2 mi).
- A magnitude 5.9 earthquake struck Peru 10 km (6.2 mi) east southeast of Pampa de Tate, Peru on February 18 at a depth of 57.0 km (35.4 mi). At least 16 people injured and damage in the Ica area.
- A magnitude 4.3 earthquake struck Algeria 13 km (8.1 mi) northeast of Thenia, Algeria on February 22 at a depth of 14.3 km (8.9 mi). Two people injured in the Corso-Draâ Ben Khedda area.
- A magnitude 6.1 earthquake struck the Islands of Four Mountains in Alaska 129 km (80 mi) north northwest of Amukta on February 26 at a depth of 265.0 km (164.7 mi).

=== March ===
March
- Strongest: 6.8 M_{w}, United States

Number by magnitude
- 8.0–8.9: 0
- 7.0–7.9: 0
- 6.0–6.9: 16
- 5.0–5.9: 140
- 4.0–4.9: 1274

- A magnitude 6.2 earthquake struck offshore of Nicaragua 33 km (21 mi) southwest of Jiquilillo on March 2 at a depth of 60.0 km (37.3 mi). Some damage was reported in Chinandega, as well as in neighbouring Honduras and in El Salvador.
- A magnitude 6.5 earthquake struck Japan 111 km (69 mi) north northwest of Nago on March 2 at a depth of 119.0 km (73.9 mi).
- (Mexico) A magnitude 6.0 earthquake struck offshore of the Mexican state of Chiapas 98 km (61 mi) southwest of Puerto Madero on March 2 at a depth of 18.5 km (11.5 mi).
- A magnitude 6.3 earthquake struck Vanuatu 262 km (163 mi) east southeast of Sola on March 5 at a depth of 638.0 km (396.4 mi).
- A magnitude 6.8 earthquake struck offshore of northern California 78 km (48 mi) west northwest of Ferndale on March 10 at a depth of 16.4 km (10.2 mi). Cracks appeared in buildings in Eureka and Crescent City, and a tsunami of 40 cm (1.3 ft) was observed.
- A magnitude 6.4 earthquake struck east of South Georgia and the South Sandwich Islands on March 11 at a depth of 10.0 km (6.2 mi).
- A magnitude 6.1 earthquake struck 184 km (114 mi) southeast of Lorengau, Papua New Guinea on March 11 at a depth of 7.0 km (4.3 mi).
- A magnitude 6.3 earthquake struck Japan 15 km (9.3 mi) north northeast of Kunisaki on March 13 at a depth of 79.0 km (49.1 mi). 21 people were injured and many houses were severely damaged from Oita Prefecture to Hiroshima.
- A magnitude 6.1 earthquake struck Peru 24 km (15 mi) south of Paracas on March 15 at a depth of 20.0 km (12.4 mi).
- A magnitude 6.3 earthquake struck Peru 16 km (9.9 mi) west of Sechura on March 15 at a depth of 29.0 km (18.0 mi). A church was destroyed and over fifty buildings were damaged and power outages occurred in Sechura. Landslides also blocked roads there.
- A magnitude 6.7 earthquake struck offshore of Chile 64 km (40 mi) west northwest of Iquique on March 16 at a depth of 20.0 km (12.4 mi). Cracks appeared on several buildings in Arica and Iquique. A tsunami of 32 cm (1.05 ft) was also observed.
- A magnitude 6.4 earthquake struck offshore of Chile 80 km (50 mi) west northwest of Iquique on March 17 at a depth of 21.0 km (13.0 mi). This was an aftershock of the Magnitude 6.7 quake.
- (India) A magnitude 6.4 earthquake struck the Andaman and Nicobar Islands 114 km (71 mi) east southeast of Mohean on March 21 at a depth of 21.5 km (13.4 mi).
- A magnitude 6.2 earthquake struck offshore of Chile 91 km (57 mi) west northwest of Iquique on March 22 at a depth of 20.0 km (12.4 mi). This is likely a foreshock of the event of the following day.
- A magnitude 6.3 earthquake struck offshore of Chile 94 km (58 mi) northwest of Iquique on March 23 at a depth of 21.0 km (13.0 mi).
- A magnitude 6.3 earthquake struck south of Fiji on March 26 at a depth of 495.0 km (307.6 mi).
- A magnitude 6.0 earthquake struck the Solomon Islands 173 km (107 mi) south southeast of Lata on March 27 at a depth of 98.0 km (60.9 mi).
- (United States) A magnitude 5.1 earthquake struck 1 mile (1.6 km) east of La Habra on March 28 at a depth of 3.2 mi (5.1 km).

=== April ===
April
- Strongest: 8.2 M_{w}, Chile
- Deadliest: 8.2 M_{w}, Chile; 11 deaths
- Total fatalities: 14

Number by magnitude
- 8.0–8.9: 1
- 7.0–7.9: 8
- 6.0–6.9: 18
- 5.0–5.9: 220
- 4.0–4.9: 1786

- A magnitude 8.2 earthquake struck offshore of Chile 94 km (58 mi) northwest of Iquique on April 1 at a depth of 25.0 km (15.5 mi). The earthquake caused 11 deaths and 209 injures across Chile and Peru. It triggered a moderate tsunami.
- A magnitude 6.0 earthquake struck offshore of Panama 48 km (30 mi) south southeast of Pedregal on April 2 at a depth of 25.0 km (15.5 mi).
- A magnitude 6.5 earthquake struck offshore of Chile 46 km (29 mi) west southwest of Iquique on April 3 at a depth of 24.1 km (15.0 mi).
- A magnitude 7.7 earthquake struck offshore of Chile 53 km (33 mi) southwest of Iquique on April 3 at a depth of 22.4 km (13.9 mi).
- A magnitude 6.4 earthquake struck offshore of Chile 78 km (48 mi) southwest of Iquique on April 3 at a depth of 25.0 km (15.5 mi).
- A magnitude 6.3 earthquake struck offshore of Chile 70 km (43 mi) southwest of Iquique on April 4 at a depth of 13.7 km (8.5 mi).
- A magnitude 6.0 earthquake struck the Solomon Islands 25 km (16 mi) west southwest of Kirakira on April 4 at a depth of 57.0 km (35.4 mi).
- A magnitude 5.4 earthquake struck China 95 km (59 mi) north of Zhaotong on April 4 at a depth of 24.7 km (15.3 mi). Twenty-one people injured, 75 homes collapsed, 2,700 others damaged, and landslides in Yongshan County.
- A magnitude 6.1 earthquake struck Nicaragua 16 km (9.9 mi) southwest of Valle San Francisco on April 10 at a depth of 13.0 km (8.1 mi). The earthquake killed 2 people.
- A magnitude 6.2 earthquake struck offshore of Chile 72 km (45 mi) southwest of Iquique on April 11 at a depth of 13.8 km (8.6 mi).
- A magnitude 7.1 earthquake struck 56 km (35 mi) west southwest of Panguna, Papua New Guinea on April 11 at a depth of 60.5 km (37.6 mi). Significant structural damage occurred on outlying islands and one child was killed when their home collapsed.
- A magnitude 6.5 earthquake struck 78 km (48 mi) southwest of Panguna, Papua New Guinea on April 11 at a depth of 20.0 km (12.4 mi).
- A magnitude 6.6 earthquake struck 15 km (9.3 mi) north of Belén, Nicaragua on April 11 at a depth of 135.0 km (83.9 mi).
- A magnitude 6.1 earthquake struck 91 km (57 mi) south southwest of Panguna, Papua New Guinea on April 12 at a depth of 20.0 km (12.4 mi).
- A magnitude 7.6 earthquake struck the Solomon Islands 93 km (58 mi) south southeast of Kirakira on April 12 at a depth of 22.6 km (14.0 mi).
- A magnitude 7.4 earthquake struck the Solomon Islands 112 km (70 mi) south of Kirakira on April 13 at a depth of 39.0 km (24.2 mi).
- A magnitude 5.2 earthquake struck the Nicaragua 3 km (1.9 mi) west northwest of Managua on April 14 at a depth of 9.8 km (6.1 mi). Four people injured and 21 homes destroyed in the Managua area.
- A magnitude 6.8 earthquake struck offshore of Bouvet Island in the Southern Ocean on April 15 at a depth of 11.2 km (7.0 mi).
- A magnitude 6.2 earthquake struck the Balleny Islands off Antarctica on April 17 at a depth of 20.6 km (12.8 mi).
- A magnitude 6.1 earthquake struck the Solomon Islands 120 km (75 mi) west southwest of Lata on April 18 at a depth of 10.0 km (6.2 mi).
- (Mexico) A magnitude 7.2 earthquake struck the Mexican state of Guerrero 33 km (21 mi) east southeast of Petatlán on April 18 at a depth of 24.0 km (14.9 mi). The earthquake injured one person and caused blackouts in nearby regions.
- A magnitude 6.6 earthquake struck 57 km (35 mi) southwest of Panguna, Papua New Guinea on April 19 at a depth of 29.0 km (18.0 mi).
- A magnitude 7.5 earthquake struck 70 km (43 mi) southwest of Panguna, Papua New Guinea on April 19 at a depth of 43.4 km (27.0 mi).
- A magnitude 6.2 earthquake struck 95 km (59 mi) south of Panguna, Papua New Guinea on April 20 at a depth of 20.0 km (12.4 mi).
- A magnitude 6.5 earthquake struck offshore British Columbia, Canada 120 km (75 mi) south of Port Hardy on April 23 at a depth of 10.0 km (6.2 mi).
- A magnitude 6.1 earthquake struck Tonga 66 km (41 mi) northeast of Nukuʻalofa on April 26 at a depth of 45.0 km (28.0 mi).

=== May ===
May
- Strongest: 6.9 M_{w}, Greece
- Deadliest: 6.9 M_{w}, Greece; 3 deaths
- Total fatalities: 8

Number by magnitude
- 8.0–8.9: 0
- 7.0–7.9: 0
- 6.0–6.9: 17
- 5.0–5.9: 128
- 4.0–4.9: 1326

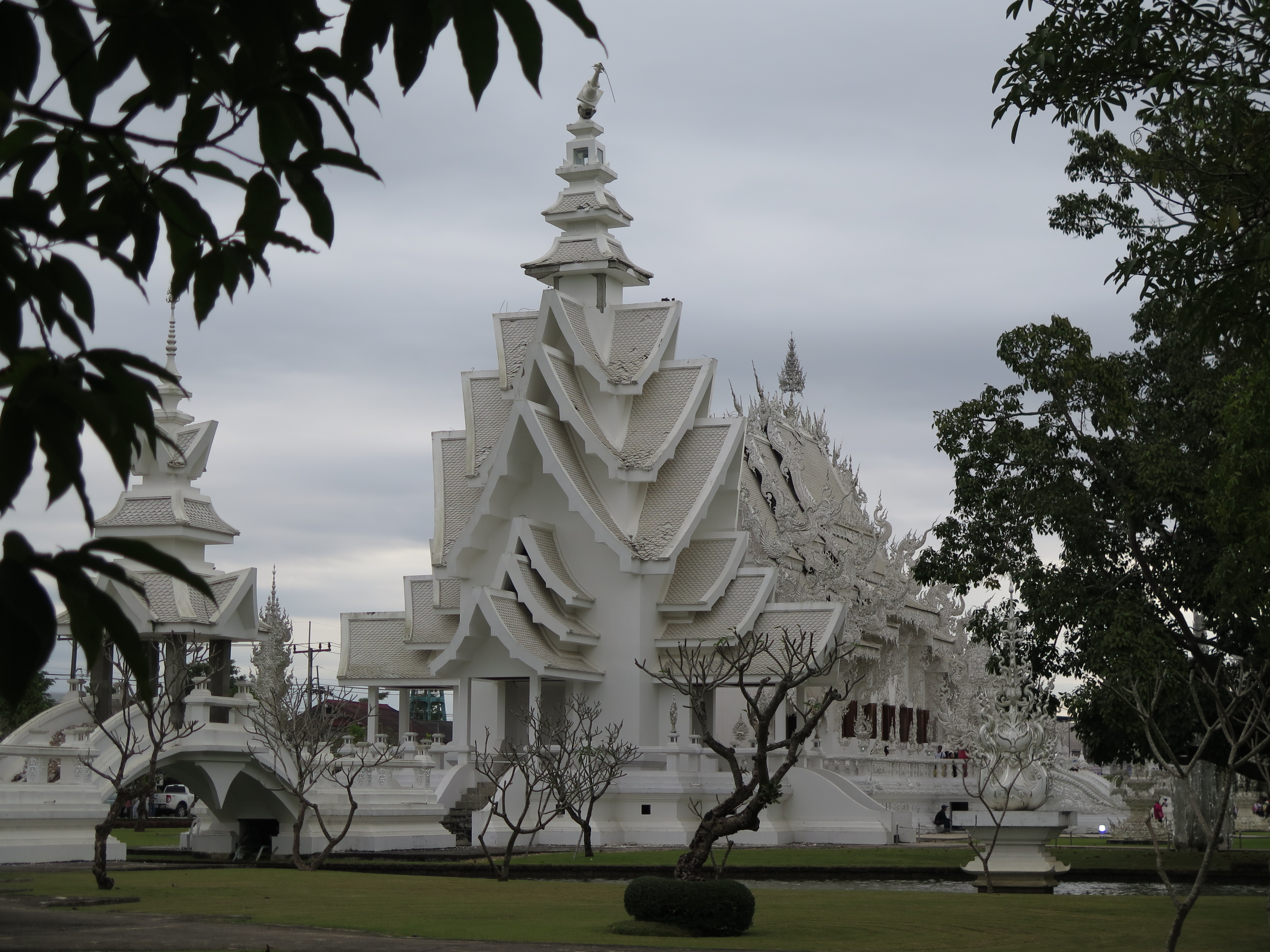
Damage to the Wat Rong Khun by the earthquake in Thailand.

- A magnitude 6.6 earthquake struck New Caledonia 204 km (127 mi) west northwest of Hunter Island on May 1 at a depth of 106.0 km (65.9 mi).
- A magnitude 5.7 earthquake struck Indonesia 87 km (54 mi) west of Ambon on May 2 at a depth of 46.6 km (29.0 mi). Three people injured and 67 homes damaged or destroyed in Ambalau.
- A magnitude 6.6 earthquake struck south of Fiji on May 4 at a depth of 527.0 km (327.5 mi).
- A magnitude 6.3 earthquake struck south of Fiji on May 4 at a depth of 634.2 km (394.1 mi).
- A magnitude 6.0 earthquake struck Japan 31 km (19 mi) east of Itō on May 4 at a depth of 153.0 km (95.1 mi).
- A magnitude 6.1 earthquake struck Thailand 13 km (8.1 mi) north northwest of Phan on May 5 at a depth of 6.0 km (3.7 mi). The earthquake killed one person. This was the strongest earthquake in Thailand's history.
- A magnitude 6.3 earthquake struck the West Chile Rise in the Southern Ocean on May 6 at a depth of 16.8 km (10.4 mi).
- A magnitude 6.0 earthquake struck 96 km (60 mi) southwest of Panguna, Papua New Guinea on May 7 at a depth of 10.0 km (6.2 mi).
- (Pakistan) A magnitude 4.5 earthquake struck the Pakistani province of Sindh 8 km (5.0 mi) south southeast of Daur on May 8 at a depth of 14.7 km (9.1 mi). The earthquake killed two people.
- (Mexico) A magnitude 6.4 earthquake struck the Mexican state of Guerrero 6 km (3.7 mi) west southwest of Tecpan de Galeana on May 8 at a depth of 17.1 km (10.6 mi). Over 9,500 homes were damaged in the epicentral area.
- (Mexico) A magnitude 6.0 earthquake struck the Mexican state of Guerrero 14 km (8.7 mi) west southwest of Tecpan de Galeana on May 10 at a depth of 23.0 km (14.3 mi).
- A magnitude 6.5 earthquake struck the East Pacific Rise on May 12 at a depth of 10.5 km (6.5 mi).
- A magnitude 6.5 earthquake struck off the Pacific coast of Panama 110 km (68 mi) southeast of Punta de Burica on May 13 at a depth of 10.0 km (6.2 mi).
- A magnitude 6.1 earthquake struck the Federated States of Micronesia 103 km (64 mi) south southeast of Ifalik on May 14 at a depth of 10.0 km (6.2 mi).
- A magnitude 6.3 earthquake struck the Federated States of Micronesia 106 km (66 mi) south southeast of Ifalik on May 15 at a depth of 11.0 km (6.8 mi).
- A magnitude 6.3 earthquake struck off the island of Negros in the Philippines 51 km (32 mi) west southwest of Alim on May 15 at a depth of 15.5 km (9.6 mi).
- A magnitude 6.0 earthquake struck offshore of Sumatra, Indonesia 302 km (188 mi) west southwest of Lhokkruet on May 18 at a depth of 35.0 km (21.7 mi).
- A magnitude 5.0 earthquake struck Elbasan, Albania on May 19 at a depth of 10.0 km (6.2 mi). Five buildings, including a school collapsed and dozens of others were damaged.
- A magnitude 6.0 earthquake struck the Bay of Bengal, India on May 21 at a depth of 47.2 km (29.3 mi). One people died and 200 were injured.
- (Greece) A magnitude 6.9 earthquake struck the Aegean Sea 22 km (14 mi) south southwest of Kamariotissa on May 24 at a depth of 6.4 km (4.0 mi). The tremor killed three, injured at least 324 people and was widely felt across the region, causing minor damage in Bulgaria and Turkey as well.
- A magnitude 6.2 earthquake struck 265 km (165 mi) west southwest of Tomatlán, Mexico on May 31 at a depth of 5.0 km (3.1 mi).

=== June ===
June
- Strongest: 7.9 M_{w}, Alaska
- Deadliest: 5.0 M_{w} India; 2 deaths
- Total fatalities: 2

Number by magnitude
- 8.0–8.9: 0
- 7.0–7.9: 1
- 6.0–6.9: 12
- 5.0–5.9: 137
- 4.0–4.9: 1491

- A magnitude 5.0 earthquake struck Jammu and Kashmir, India on June 13 at a depth of 42.7 km (26.5 mi). Two people, including a child died when a house collapsed.
- A magnitude 6.4 earthquake struck the Indian Ocean west northwest of the Cocos (Keeling) Islands on June 14 at a depth of 4.0 km (2.5 mi).
- A magnitude 6.2 earthquake struck Vanuatu 85 km (53 mi) west northwest of Sola on June 19 at a depth of 36.0 km (22.4 mi).
- A magnitude 6.9 earthquake struck New Zealand 80 km (50 mi) south southeast of Raoul Island on June 23 at a depth of 20.0 km (12.4 mi).
- A magnitude 6.5 earthquake struck New Zealand 83 km (52 mi) south southeast of Raoul Island on June 23 at a depth of 10.0 km (6.2 mi).
- A magnitude 6.7 earthquake struck New Zealand 79 km (49 mi) south southeast of Raoul Island on June 23 at a depth of 26.6 km (16.5 mi).
- A magnitude 7.9 earthquake struck Alaska 19 km (12 mi) southeast of Little Sitkin Island on June 23 at a depth of 109.0 km (67.7 mi).
- A magnitude 6.0 earthquake struck Alaska 3 km (1.9 mi) west northwest of Little Sitkin Island on June 23 at a depth of 102.9 km (63.9 mi).
- A magnitude 6.3 earthquake struck Alaska 55 km (34 mi) east southeast of Buldir Island on June 24 at a depth of 4.0 km (2.5 mi).
- (Japan) A magnitude 6.2 earthquake struck 138 km (86 mi) east southeast of Iwo Jima on June 29 at a depth of 48.0 km (29.8 mi).
- A magnitude 6.9 earthquake struck 154 km (96 mi) north northwest of Visokoi Island of the South Georgia and the South Sandwich Islands on June 29 at a depth of 8.0 km (5.0 mi).
- A magnitude 6.4 earthquake struck Tonga 193 km (120 mi) south southeast of Mata-Utu, Wallis and Futuna on June 29 at a depth of 9.0 km (5.6 mi).
- (France) A magnitude 6.7 earthquake struck Wallis and Futuna 201 km (125 mi) south southeast of Mata-Utu on June 29 at a depth of 18.0 km (11.2 mi).
- (Japan) A magnitude 6.2 earthquake struck the Bonin Islands on June 30 at a depth of 511.0 km (317.5 mi).

=== July ===
July
- Strongest: 6.9 M_{w}, Mexico; 6.9 M_{w}, Fiji
- Deadliest: 6.9 M_{w}, Mexico; 8 deaths
- Total fatalities: 9

Number by magnitude
- 8.0–8.9: 0
- 7.0–7.9: 0
- 6.0–6.9: 15
- 5.0–5.9: 108
- 4.0–4.9: 1334

- (Antarctica) A magnitude 6.0 earthquake struck the Balleny Islands on July 2 at a depth of 10.0 km (6.2 mi).
- A magnitude 6.3 earthquake struck New Zealand 193 km (120 mi) southeast of Raoul Island on July 3 at a depth of 35.0 km (21.7 mi).
- A magnitude 6.5 earthquake struck in the Solomon Sea off Papua New Guinea 196 km (122 mi) south of Taron on July 4 at a depth of 20.0 km (12.4 mi).
- A magnitude 6.0 earthquake struck 86 km (53 mi) southeast of Sinabang, Indonesia on July 5 at a depth of 20.0 km (12.4 mi).
- A magnitude 6.9 earthquake struck 4 km (2.5 mi) west of Puerto Madero, Mexico on July 7 at a depth of 53.0 km (32.9 mi). Four were killed in the state of Chiapas, and the earthquake also affected Guatemala, where it killed at least four more people. 481 were injured.
- A magnitude 6.2 earthquake struck Vanuatu 9 km (5.6 mi) east northeast of Port-Vila on July 8 at a depth of 110.2 km (68.5 mi).
- A magnitude 5.0 earthquake struck China 130 km (81 mi) northeast of Shache on July 8 at a depth of 10.0 km (6.2 mi). One person was injured, 54 houses collapsed and 800 others were damaged.
- A magnitude 6.5 earthquake struck Japan 139 km (86 mi) east of Iwaki on July 11 at a depth of 20.0 km (12.4 mi). Three people were injured and a 20 cm (7.9 in) tsunami was triggered in Fukushima Prefecture.
- A magnitude 6.3 earthquake struck offshore south of the province of Davao Oriental in the Philippines 78 km (48 mi) south southeast of Pondaguitan on July 14 at a depth of 20.0 km (12.4 mi).
- A magnitude 6.0 earthquake struck Yukon, Canada near the border with the Alaska Panhandle 90 km (56 mi) north northwest of Yakutat on July 17 at a depth of 10.0 km (6.2 mi).
- A magnitude 4.7 earthquake struck Vietnam 19 km (12 mi) north northeast of Sơn La on July 19 at a depth of 17.1 km (10.6 mi). Cracks appeared on several houses in Ít Ong.
- A magnitude 6.2 earthquake struck Tonga 76 km (47 mi) west of Hihifo on July 19 at a depth of 227.3 km (141.2 mi).
- A magnitude 6.0 earthquake struck the Owen fracture zone east-southeast of Yemen's Socotra Island on July 19 at a depth of 10.0 km (6.2 mi).
- (Russia) A magnitude 6.2 earthquake struck the Kuril Islands 96 km (60 mi) southeast of Kuril'sk on July 20 at a depth of 61.0 km (37.9 mi).
- A magnitude 6.9 earthquake struck Fiji 99 km (62 mi) north northeast of Ndoi Island on July 21 at a depth of 615.4 km (382.4 mi).
- A magnitude 6.0 earthquake struck the northern Mid-Atlantic Ridge on July 27 at a depth of 10.0 km (6.2 mi).
- A magnitude 4.7 earthquake struck China 46 km (29 mi) north northeast of Tongchuan on July 29 at a depth of 9.4 km (5.8 mi). Two people injured and 773 homes damaged in Zitong County.
- (Mexico) A magnitude 6.3 earthquake struck the southern part of the Mexican state of Veracruz near the border with Oaxaca 24 km (15 mi) southeast of Playa Vicente on July 29 at a depth of 107.0 km (66.5 mi). One person died of a heart attack, another was injured and slight damage occurred.

=== August ===
August
- Strongest: 6.9 M_{w}, Federated States of Micronesia
- Deadliest: 6.2 M_{w}, China; 729 deaths
- Total fatalities: 741

Number by magnitude
- 8.0–8.9: 0
- 7.0–7.9: 0
- 6.0–6.9: 9
- 5.0–5.9: 108
- 4.0–4.9: 772

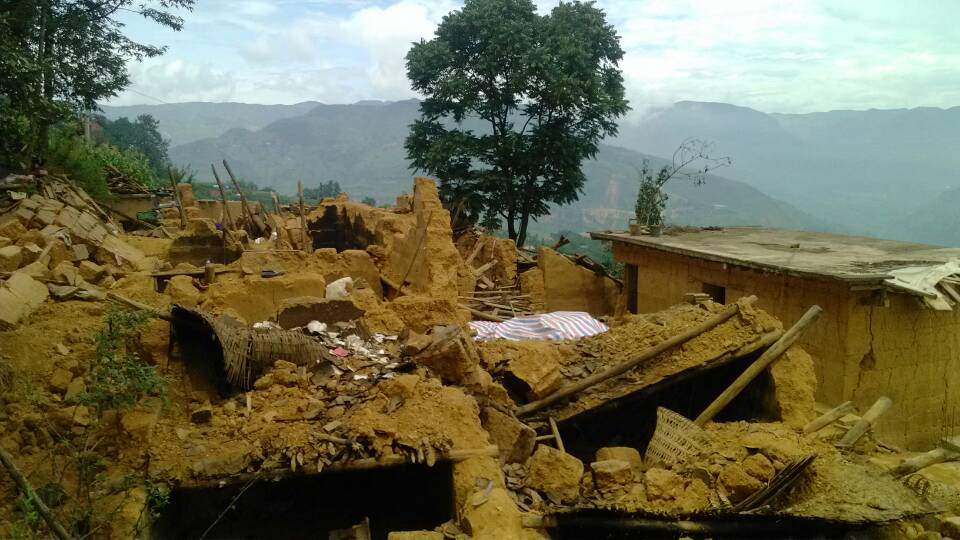
The town of Zhoujiaping after the earthquake in China.

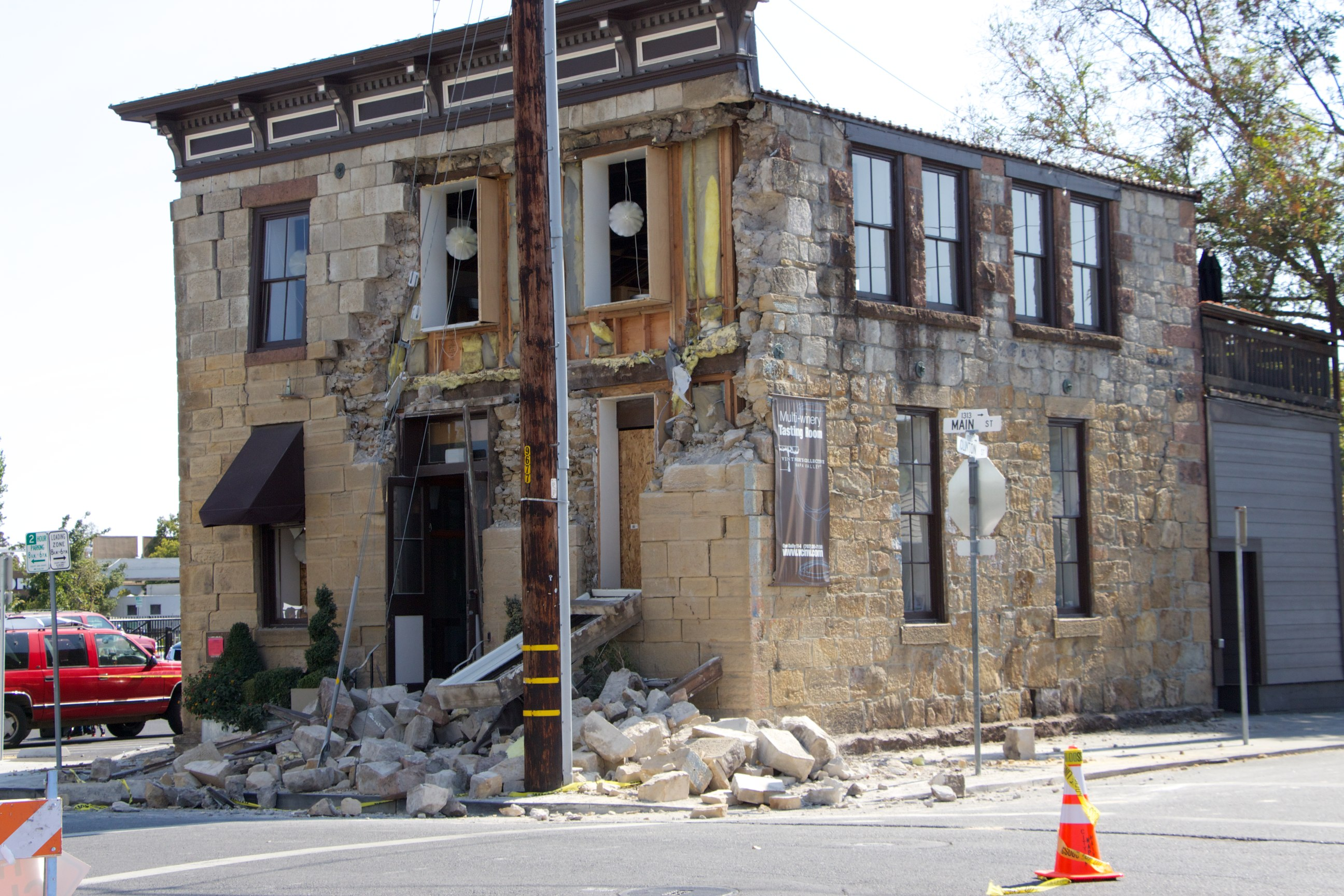
Damage to the Sam Kee Laundry Building in California.

- A magnitude 5.5 earthquake struck Algeria 11 km (6.8 mi) north of Bordj El Kiffan on August 1 at a depth of 10.0 km (6.2 mi). The earthquake killed six people.
- A magnitude 6.9 earthquake struck the Pacific south of the Federated States of Micronesia 340 km (210 mi) north northwest of Lorengau on August 3 at a depth of 13.0 km (8.1 mi).
- A magnitude 6.2 earthquake struck Ludian County in Yunnan province, China 11 km (6.8 mi) west of Wenping on August 3 at a depth of 12.0 km (7.5 mi). At least 617 people were killed, 3,143 were injured, and 112 were missing.
- A magnitude 5.4 earthquake struck South Africa 3 km (1.9 mi) east southeast of Orkney on August 5 at a depth of 5.0 km (3.1 mi). The earthquake killed one person and another 34 were wounded.
- A magnitude 6.2 earthquake struck Maluku, Indonesia 179 km (111 mi) northeast of Lospalos on August 6 at a depth of 10.0 km (6.2 mi).
- A magnitude 6.1 earthquake struck Japan 78 km (48 mi) east of Mutsu on August 10 at a depth of 41.0 km (25.5 mi).
- A magnitude 5.1 earthquake struck Ecuador 22 km (14 mi) west southwest of Cayambe on August 12 at a depth of 11.9 km (7.4 mi). The earthquake killed at least 4 people and another 8 were injured.
- A magnitude 4.7 earthquake struck Ecuador 23 km (14 mi) northeast of Sangolquí on August 16 at a depth of 57.7 km (35.9 mi). Thirteen people injured, additional damage and landslides occurred in Quito.
- A magnitude 5.0 earthquake struck China 91 km (57 mi) north of Zhaotong on August 16 at a depth of 10.0 km (6.2 mi). Twenty people injured and 1,463 homes were damaged, including 45 which collapsed.
- A magnitude 6.2 earthquake struck southwestern Iran near the border with Iraq 40 km (25 mi) east of Dehloran on August 18 at a depth of 10.2 km (6.3 mi). The earthquake injured at least 415 people and damaged at least 17,000 houses.
- A magnitude 6.0 earthquake struck Iran 42 km (26 mi) east southeast of Dehloran on August 18 at a depth of 5.0 km (3.1 mi).
- A magnitude 6.4 earthquake struck 23 km (14 mi) west northwest of Hacienda La Calera, Chile on August 23 at a depth of 32.0 km (19.9 mi). Two people injured, minor damage and power outages occurred in Valparaíso.
- A magnitude 6.0 earthquake struck Napa, California, in the northern San Francisco Bay Area, on August 24 at a depth of 11.1 km (6.9 mi). 70,000 customers were immediately without electricity and some structural damage was reported, there were 170 reported injuries It is northern California's strongest earthquake since the 1989 Loma Prieta event. One woman died from her injuries 12 days later.
- A magnitude 6.8 earthquake struck Peru 43 km (27 mi) east northeast of Tambo on August 24 at a depth of 101.0 km (62.8 mi). Two people injured, one home destroyed, at least 19 structures damaged and two landslides occurred.

=== September ===
September
- Strongest: 6.7 M_{w}, Guam
- Deadliest: 4.9 M_{w}, Peru; 8 deaths
- Total fatalities: 13

Number by magnitude
- 8.0–8.9: 0
- 7.0–7.9: 0
- 6.0–6.9: 7
- 5.0–5.9: 126
- 4.0–4.9: 374

- A magnitude 3.5 earthquake struck Zenica, Bosnia and Herzegovina on September 4 at a depth of 5.0 km (3.1 mi). Five miners lost their lives due to a mining accident in Zenica.
- A magnitude 6.0 earthquake struck Tonga 168 km (104 mi) east of 'Ohonua on September 4 at a depth of 35.0 km (21.7 mi).
- (Chile) A magnitude 6.1 earthquake struck near Easter Island on September 4 at a depth of 7.0 km (4.3 mi).
- A magnitude 6.2 earthquake struck Indonesia 132 km (82 mi) southeast of Modayag on September 10 at a depth of 35.0 km (21.7 mi).
- A magnitude 4.8 earthquake struck Indonesia 19 km (12 mi) northwest of Solok on September 10 at a depth of 31.4 km (19.5 mi). At least two people injured, 15 homes destroyed and 205 structures damaged in the Tanah Datar area.
- A magnitude 5.5 earthquake struck Japan 4 km (2.5 mi) east southeast of Sakai on September 16 at a depth of 49.9 km (31.0 mi). The earthquake injured at least 8 people.
- A magnitude 6.7 earthquake struck Guam 43 km (27 mi) northwest of Piti on September 17 at a depth of 130.0 km (80.8 mi).
- A magnitude 5.2 earthquake struck the Philippines 7 km (4.3 mi) northeast of Dolo on September 20 at a depth of 25.7 km (16.0 mi). Three people injured, 17 homes destroyed and 69 structures damaged in the Makilala area.
- A magnitude 6.2 earthquake struck Salta Province in Argentina 56 km (35 mi) northwest of San Antonio de los Cobres on September 24 at a depth of 224.0 km (139.2 mi).
- A magnitude 6.1 earthquake struck the Solomon Islands 157 km (98 mi) south southwest of Gizo on September 25 at a depth of 4.0 km (2.5 mi).
- A magnitude 6.2 earthquake struck Alaska, United States 96 km (60 mi) west northwest of Willow on September 25 at a depth of 108.9 km (67.7 mi). Minor damage occurred in the Anchorage area.
- A magnitude 4.9 earthquake struck Peru 19 km (12 mi) south southwest of Urcos on September 28 at a depth of 10.0 km (6.2 mi). The earthquake killed 8 people.

=== October ===
October
- Strongest: 7.3 M_{w}, Nicaragua
- Deadliest: 7.3 M_{w}, Nicaragua; 4 deaths
- Total fatalities: 5

Number by magnitude
- 8.0–8.9: 0
- 7.0–7.9: 2
- 6.0–6.9: 6
- 5.0–5.9: 122
- 4.0–4.9: 609

- A magnitude 4.9 earthquake struck Bolivia 26 km (16 mi) south of Chulumani on October 1 at a depth of 16.7 km (10.4 mi). Some homes collapsed and 142 others damaged in the epicentral area.
- A magnitude 5.3 earthquake struck Indonesia 135 km (84 mi) east southeast of Sorong on October 5 at a depth of 3.0 km (1.9 mi). Some people injured and 113 homes damaged in Maybrat Regency.
- A magnitude 6.1 earthquake struck Jinggu County in Yunnan province, China 23 km (14 mi) west southwest of Weiyuan on October 7 at a depth of 8.5 km (5.3 mi). The earthquake killed one person.
- (Mexico) A magnitude 6.1 earthquake struck off the southern Baja Peninsula 111 km (69 mi) west southwest of El Dorado on October 8 at a depth of 10.0 km (6.2 mi).
- A magnitude 7.0 earthquake struck the East Pacific Rise some 565 km (351 mi) south southwest of Easter Island on October 9 at a depth of 16.5 km (10.3 mi).
- A magnitude 6.6 earthquake struck the East Pacific Rise some 565 km (351 mi) south southwest of Easter Island on October 9 at a depth of 10.0 km (6.2 mi).
- (Georgia (country)) A magnitude 4.0 earthquake struck Georgia 9 km (5.6 mi) east southeast of T’q’ibuli on October 10 at a depth of 10.0 km (6.2 mi). Several people injured after a mine collapse in the T’q’ibuli area.
- A magnitude 6.1 earthquake struck Japan 152 km (94 mi) east northeast of Hachinohe on October 11 at a depth of 22.0 km (13.7 mi).
- A magnitude 7.3 earthquake struck Nicaragua 74 km (46 mi) south of Intipucá on October 14 at a depth of 40.0 km (24.9 mi). The earthquake killed at least three people in El Salvador and damaged 30 homes and buildings, and another person died, buildings were damaged and several people were evacuated in Honduras. More than 2,000 homes were damaged in Nicaragua.
- A magnitude 5.7 earthquake struck Iran 53 km (33 mi) east southeast of Dehloran on October 15 at a depth of 10.0 km (6.2 mi). The earthquake injured at least 19 people, including eight after a landslide struck a bus near the epicenter.
- A magnitude 5.6 earthquake struck Ecuador 7 km (4.3 mi) northeast of El Ángel on October 20 at a depth of 10.0 km (6.2 mi). More than 1,920 houses damaged or destroyed in Ecuador. At least five homes destroyed and 75 others damaged in Colombia.
- A magnitude 4.3 earthquake struck Iran 59 km (37 mi) northeast of Minab on October 21 at a depth of 24.6 km (15.3 mi). At least three homes destroyed in the Manoojan area.
- A magnitude 5.3 earthquake struck Western Greece on October 24 at a depth of 0.1 km (0.062 mi). Cracks were reported in walls and plaster in Amfilochia.
- A magnitude 6.0 earthquake struck Tonga 122 km (76 mi) northwest of Hihifo on October 28 at a depth of 8.0 km (5.0 mi).
- A magnitude 4.5 earthquake struck Uganda 14 km (8.7 mi) northeast of Margherita on October 31 at a depth of 10.0 km (6.2 mi). Many people injured and many buildings damaged or destroyed in Rwenzori. Some buildings damaged in the Fort Portal area.

=== November ===
November
- Strongest: 7.1 M_{w}, Fiji; 7.1 M_{w}, Indonesia
- Deadliest: 5.9 M_{w} China; 5 deaths
- Total fatalities: 8

Number by magnitude
- 8.0–8.9: 0
- 7.0–7.9: 2
- 6.0–6.9: 9
- 5.0–5.9: 125
- 4.0–4.9: 418

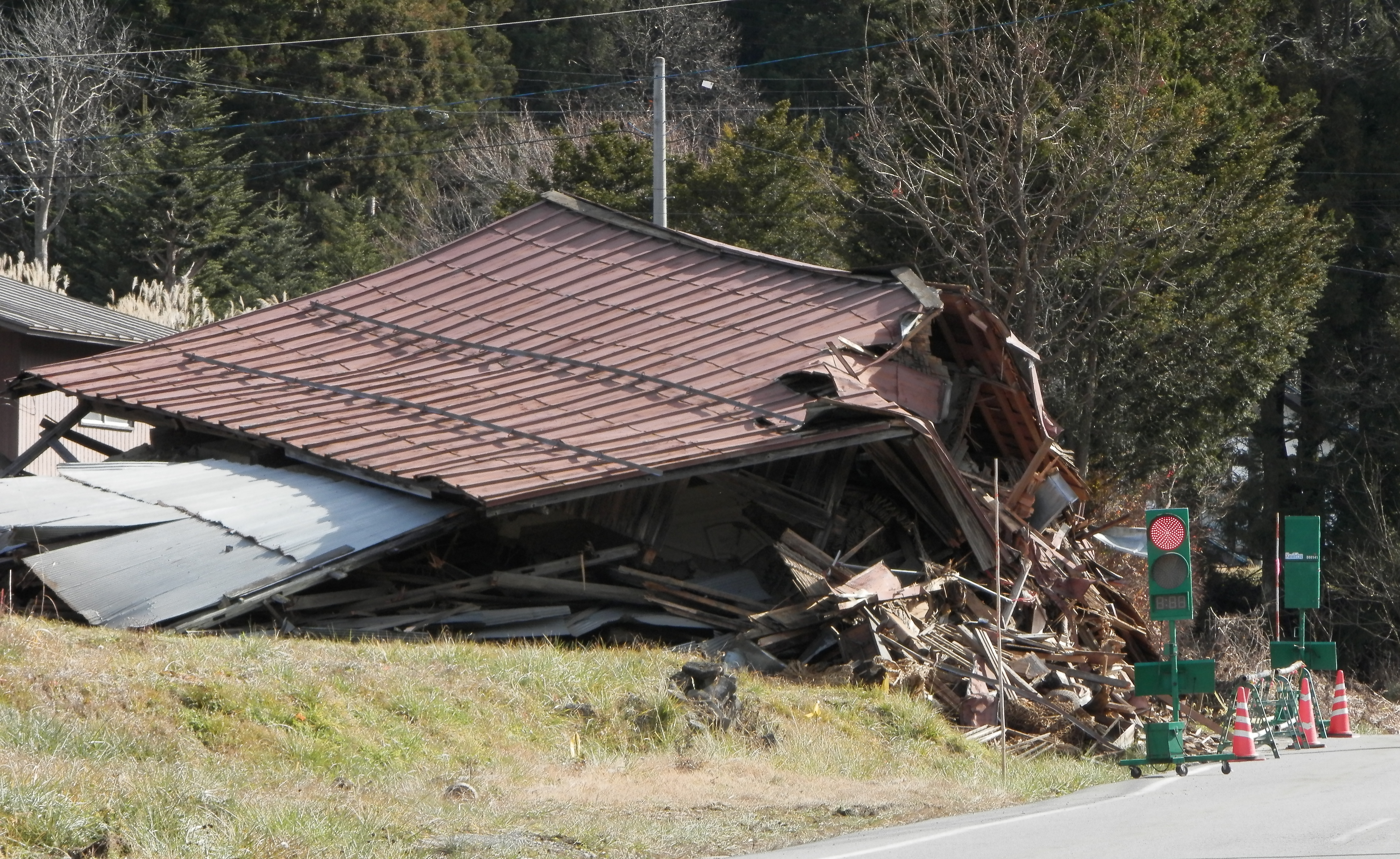
Damage to a house in the earthquake in Japan.

- (Chile) A magnitude 6.0 earthquake struck the Easter Island region on November 1 at a depth of 10.0 km (6.2 mi).
- A magnitude 7.1 earthquake struck 144 km (89 mi) northeast of Ndoi Island, Fiji on November 1 at a depth of 434.0 km (269.7 mi).
- A magnitude 6.6 earthquake struck Papua New Guinea 79 km (49 mi) north northeast of Finschhafen on November 7 at a depth of 53.2 km (33.1 mi).
- A magnitude 6.0 earthquake struck 523 km (325 mi) southwest of Ahau, Fiji on November 13 at a depth of 10.0 km (6.2 mi).
- A magnitude 5.4 earthquake struck Iran 89 km (55 mi) north northwest of Bandar Abbas on November 10 at a depth of 10.0 km (6.2 mi). At least 51 homes destroyed and 103 others damaged in the Sirmand area.
- A magnitude 5.2 earthquake struck Kyrgyzstan 8 km (5.0 mi) southeast of Kadzhi-Say on November 14 at a depth of 10.0 km (6.2 mi). More than 700 homes and 12 buildings damaged or destroyed in the Kadzhi-Say area.
- A magnitude 3.5 earthquake struck the Czech Republic 11 km (6.8 mi) northeast of Ostrava on November 14 at a depth of 2.0 km (1.2 mi). Three people died and nine were injured due to a mining accident in Karviná.
- A magnitude 4.7 earthquake struck China 71 km (44 mi) northwest of Baiyin on November 14 at a depth of 10.0 km (6.2 mi). More than 4,702 homes were damaged.
- A magnitude 7.1 earthquake struck 154 km (96 mi) northwest of Kota Ternate, Indonesia in the Northern Molucca Sea on November 15 at a depth of 45.0 km (28.0 mi). At least two people were injured; one due to falling bricks and another from electrocution. At least 15 buildings and a bridge were damaged and a small tsunami was observed.
- A magnitude 6.7 earthquake struck 183 km (114 mi) northeast of Gisborne, New Zealand on November 16 at a depth of 22.0 km (13.7 mi).
- A magnitude 6.1 earthquake struck 307 km (191 mi) west of Marion Island, in the Prince Edward Islands on November 17 at a depth of 10.0 km (6.2 mi).
- A magnitude 6.5 earthquake struck 123 km (76 mi) west northwest of Tobelo, Indonesia on November 21 at a depth of 35.0 km (21.7 mi). One home collapsed and two buildings damaged in the West Halmahera Regency.
- A magnitude 5.9 earthquake struck 38 km (24 mi) north northwest of Kangding, China on November 22 at a depth of 9.0 km (5.6 mi). The earthquake killed five people and another 54 were injured.
- A magnitude 6.2 earthquake struck 15 km (9.3 mi) north northeast of Ōmachi, Japan on November 22 at a depth of 9.0 km (5.6 mi). The earthquake injured at least 41 people.
- A magnitude 5.7 earthquake struck Romania 5 km (3.1 mi) from Mărășești on November 22 at a depth of 39.0 km (24.2 mi). The earthquake injured 9 people.
- A magnitude 5.6 earthquake struck China 24 km (15 mi) northwest of Kangding on November 25 at a depth of 9.0 km (5.6 mi). The earthquake injured at least 3 people.
- A magnitude 6.8 earthquake struck 157 km (98 mi) northwest of Kota Ternate, Indonesia on November 26 at a depth of 39.0 km (24.2 mi).

=== December ===
December
- Strongest: 6.8 M_{w}, Papua New Guinea
- Deadliest: 5.5 M_{w}, China; 1 death 6.1 M_{w}, Guatemala; 1 death
- Total fatalities: 2

Number by magnitude
- 8.0–8.9: 0
- 7.0–7.9: 0
- 6.0–6.9: 10
- 5.0–5.9: 120
- 4.0–4.9: 339

- A magnitude 6.6 earthquake struck 106 km (66 mi) west southwest of Sangay in the Philippines on December 2 at a depth of 614.0 km (381.5 mi).
- A magnitude 5.6 earthquake struck 19 km (12 mi) southwest of Weiyuan, China on December 6 at a depth of 10.0 km (6.2 mi). The earthquake killed a 9-year-old boy and another 8 people were wounded.
- A magnitude 6.0 earthquake struck 15 km (9.3 mi) east southeast of Punta de Burica, Panama on December 6 at a depth of 15.0 km (9.3 mi).
- A magnitude 6.0 earthquake struck 223 km (139 mi) north northwest of Saumlaki, Indonesia on December 6 at a depth of 116.0 km (72.1 mi).
- A magnitude 6.6 earthquake struck 115 km (71 mi) west of Panguna, Papua New Guinea on December 7 at a depth of 23.0 km (14.3 mi).
- A magnitude 6.1 earthquake struck 61 km (38 mi) south southwest of Nueva Concepción, Escuintla, Guatemala on December 7 at a depth of 32.0 km (19.9 mi). One man was killed by a landslide in Villa Nueva, at least one building was damaged and windows were broken.
- A magnitude 6.6 earthquake struck 22 km (14 mi) east southeast of Punta de Burica, Panama on December 8 at a depth of 20.0 km (12.4 mi). Some homes and buildings damaged in the David area.
- A magnitude 6.1 earthquake struck 84 km (52 mi) east northeast of Keelung, Taiwan on December 10 at a depth of 256.0 km (159.1 mi).
- A magnitude 6.3 earthquake struck 156 km (97 mi) west northwest of Tobelo, Indonesia on December 21 at a depth of 41.0 km (25.5 mi).
- A magnitude 4.9 earthquake struck 5 km (3.1 mi) southeast of Bouinan, Algeria on December 23 at a depth of 7.3 km (4.5 mi). Many people injured, several buildings destroyed or heavily damaged and a road collapsed in the Hammam Melouane-Chebli area.
- A magnitude 3.9 earthquake struck 5 km (3.1 mi) north of Velagici, Bosnia and Herzegovina on December 25 at a depth of 23.4 km (14.5 mi). It was the largest in a series of earthquakes, and caused damage to houses and a school in Velagici.
- A magnitude 6.1 earthquake struck 109 km (68 mi) south southeast of Cagayancillo, Philippines on December 29 at a depth of 8.0 km (5.0 mi).
- A magnitude 4.4 earthquake struck 69 km (43 mi) west of Firuzabad, Iran, on December 30 at a depth of 18.0 km (11.2 mi). Several homes damaged or destroyed and landslides occurred in the Bushkan area.
- A magnitude 6.0 earthquake struck 38 km (24 mi) north northeast of Ndoi Island, Fiji on December 30 at a depth of 599.3 km (372.4 mi).
