= 2014 Murmuri earthquake =

Earthquake in Iran

- Location within Iran
- UTC time: 2014-08-18 02:32:05
- ISC event: 610785789
- USGS-ANSS: ComCat
- Local date: August 18, 2014
- Local time: 06:02:05 IRST
- Magnitude: 6.2 M_{w}
- Depth: 10 km (6 mi)
- Epicenter: 32.74°N 47.67°E
- Type: Thrust
- Areas affected: Iran
- Max. intensity: MMI VIII (Severe)
- Casualties: 60–330 injured

The 2014 Murmuri earthquake occurred on August 18 in the Zagros Mountains of Iran with a moment magnitude of 6.2 and a maximum Mercalli intensity of VIII (Severe). The thrust earthquake injured 60–330 people and was followed by a number of high intensity aftershocks.

== Earthquake ==
The area had not seen a large seismic event since developments in Earth observation satellites allowed scientists to more precisely study earthquakes. Observations made using Interferometric synthetic aperture radar imply that different faults were ruptured by the mainshock and the largest aftershock, each leading to different surface deformations.

== Damage ==
Phone lines, water, and electricity were cut off. Eight villages were hit particularly hard, each losing around half of the homes in the area.

== Aftershocks ==
In the several days following the mainshock, four strong aftershocks occurred. Within the first twenty-four hours, events with magnitudes of 5.6 M_{w} and 5.4 M_{w} occurred, each having a Mercalli intensity of VII (Very strong). Just over six hours later, a 6.0 M_{w} and intensity VIII (Severe) shock occurred. Several days later, a 5.6 M_{w} (intensity VII) shock occurred.

== See also ==
- List of earthquakes in 2014
- List of earthquakes in Iran
