= 2014 Aleutian Islands earthquake =

Earthquake in Alaska, United States

- Location within Alaska
- UTC time: 2014-06-23 20:53:09
- ISC event: 604760173
- USGS-ANSS: ComCat
- Local date: 23 June 2014
- Local time: 11:53 (HDT) (UTC-9)
- Magnitude: 7.9 M_{w}
- Depth: 107.5 kilometers (66.8 mi)
- Epicenter: 51.849°N 178.735°E
- Type: Oblique-slip
- Areas affected: Alaska, United States
- Max. intensity: MMI VIII (Severe)
- Tsunami: 17 cm (0.56 ft)
- Aftershocks: 6.0 M_{w} June 23 at 21:11 UTC

The 2014 Aleutian Islands earthquake occurred on 23 June at 11:53 HDT (UTC-9) with a moment magnitude of 7.9 and a maximum Mercalli intensity of VIII (Severe). The shock occurred in the Aleutian Islands – part of the US state of Alaska – 19 miles (31 km) southeast of Little Sitkin Island.

== Earthquake ==
The earthquake was initially reported as 8.0 M_{w} before it was downgraded to 7.9. The rupture was on a normal fault, at ~107 km depth. Based on the geometry of the slab, and the relative movement of the tectonic plates, the slip vector is likely to have been oblique down-dip towards the ESE. The fault plane appears to be oblique, striking NW-SE and cutting steeply into the subducting slab.

== Tsunami ==
A tsunami warning was issued, but was soon downgraded to a tsunami advisory for much of the Aleutian Islands; however, the hypocenter was too deep to generate a tsunami that would affect the Pacific basin. A small non-destructive tsunami was generated, with heights of 17 cm on Amchitka.

== See also ==
- intermediate-depth earthquake
- List of earthquakes in 2014
- List of earthquakes in Alaska
- List of earthquakes in the United States
