= 2014 Iquique earthquake =

Earthquake near Chile

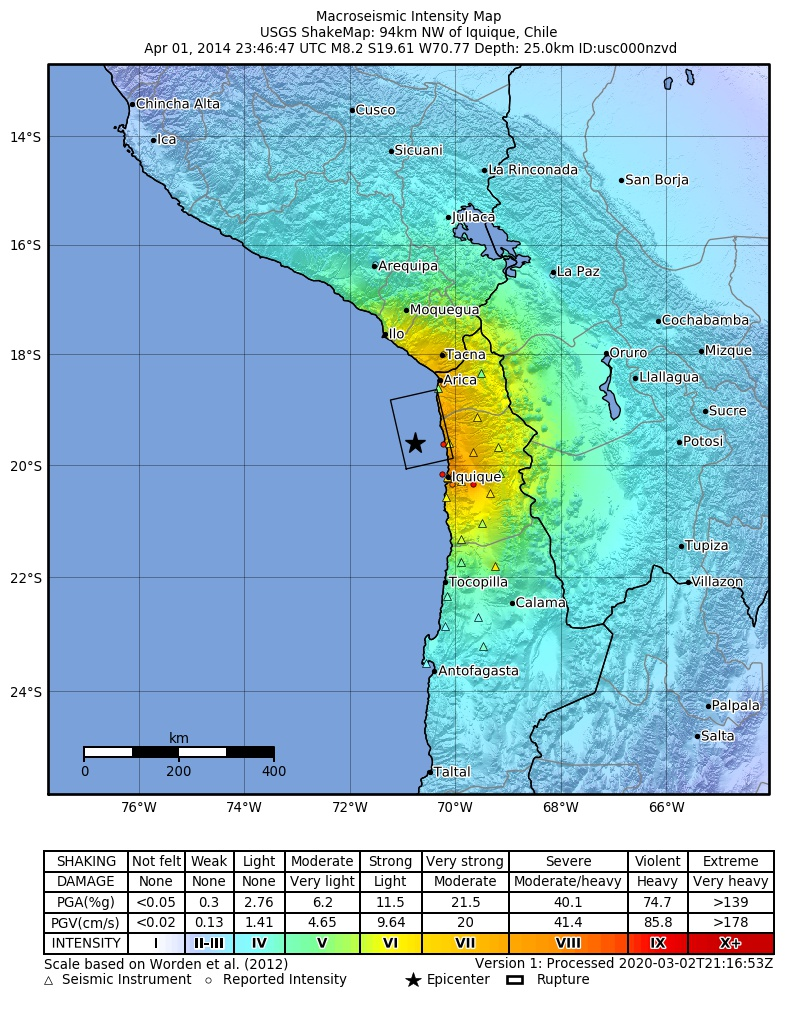
- USGS ShakeMap for the earthquake

- Location within South America
- UTC time: 2014-04-01 23:46:47
- ISC event: 610102185
- USGS-ANSS: ComCat
- Local date: 1 April 2014
- Local time: 20:46 CST (UTC-03:00)
- Duration: 3 minutes
- Magnitude: M_{w} 8.1–8.2
- Depth: 25 km (16 mi)
- Epicenter: 19.610°S 70.769°W
- Type: Megathrust
- Areas affected: Chile, Peru
- Total damage: 8,300 homes damaged
- Max. intensity: MMI VIII (Severe)
- Peak acceleration: 1.05 g
- Tsunami: 4.6 m (15 ft)
- Casualties: 11 dead, 209 injured

The 2014 Iquique earthquake struck off the coast of Chile on 1 April, with a moment magnitude of 8.1–8.2, at 20:46 local time (23:46 UTC). The epicenter of the earthquake was approximately 95 kilometres (59 mi) northwest of Iquique. The mainshock was preceded by a number of moderate to large shocks and was followed by a large number of moderate to very large aftershocks, including a M7.7 event on 3 April. The megathrust earthquake triggered a tsunami of up to 2.11 metres (6.9 ft) that hit Iquique at 21:05 local time (00:05 UTC, 2 April). Similar-sized tsunamis were also reported to have hit the coasts of Pisagua and Arica.

== Geology ==
A number of mid-sized quakes struck the same area in the preceding weeks. These quakes and the main tremor are associated with the boundary of the Nazca plate and the South American plate.

== Earthquake ==
There was a cluster of earthquakes starting from the one occurring on 16 March with a magnitude of M_{w} 6.7, and a large earthquake had been expected. The mainshock measured a moment magnitude of 8.1, according to the Global Centroid Moment Tensor (GCMT), although the United States Geological Survey (USGS) put the magnitude at M_{ww} 8.2. This earthquake was smaller than what was expected, with a rupture of 200 km (120 mi) in length instead of the expected 600 km (370 mi) rupture. The earthquake was felt in Chile, Peru, and Bolivia. The intensity reached intensity VIII (Severe) in the city of Iquique.

=== Aftershocks ===
There were several significant aftershocks above 6.0 magnitude and many more of lower magnitude over subsequent days.

Time (local)	M	I	Depth	Epicenter
1 April at 20:57:58	6.9	VI	28.4 km (17.6 mi)	91 km (57 mi) WNW of Iquique
2 April at 22:58:30	6.5	VI	24.1 km (15.0 mi)	46 km (29 mi) WSW of Iquique
2 April at 23:43:13	7.7	IX	22.4 km (13.9 mi)	53 km (33 mi) SW of Iquique
3 April at 02:26:15	6.4	VI	25 km (16 mi)	78 km (48 mi) SW of Iquique

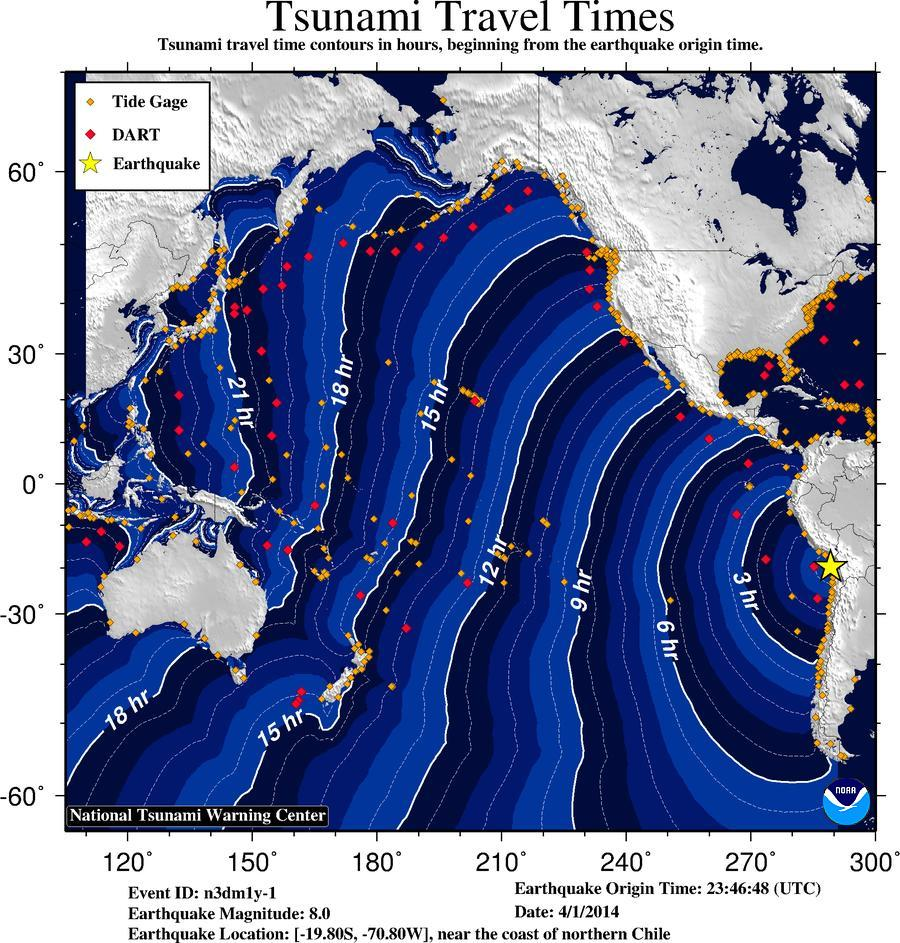
Travel time projection of the tsunami

Under advice from the Pacific Tsunami Warning Center, tsunami warnings were issued for the Latin American Pacific coastlines of Chile, Peru, and Ecuador shortly after the earthquake occurred. Chile was subsequently hit by a large tsunami in its northern territories, with a maximum height of 4.63 m (15.2 ft) in Arica.

The tsunami warning was later canceled for all countries except Chile and Peru within a few hours of the earthquake. The tsunami warning was canceled for both Chile and Peru at around 4:58 UTC on 2 April. Hawaii was under a tsunami advisory for over 13 hours. On 3 April local time, tsunamis were observed in Japan. The tsunami reached 60 centimetres (2.0 ft) high in Kuji, Iwate Prefecture, Japan.

== Impact ==
=== Chile ===
Five people died of indirect causes and one woman was reportedly crushed to death when a wall collapsed. A loader was crushed by a falling metal structure and died of the injuries afterwards. An additional three people were killed due to landslides and on April 4, a six-day-old infant died due to hypothermia, after she and her mother sought refuge in a tent.

In Iquique, over 200 people were hospitalized and an airport's control tower was damaged. Houses also collapsed in Arica. Electricity and water services were interrupted in the regions of Arica y Parinacota and Tarapacá.

During the aftermath of the earthquake, 293 prisoners escaped from a women's prison in Iquique when a wall collapsed. Many returned voluntarily a short time later, while Chilean soldiers searched for the rest.

=== Peru ===
In southern Peru, nine people were injured, four structures, including two temples collapsed and 81 houses, three schools, four clinics, three public buildings and a temple were damaged.

== See also ==
- 1868 Arica earthquake
- 1877 Iquique earthquake
- 2010 Chile earthquake
- List of earthquakes in 2014
- List of earthquakes in Chile
