= Fareghan =

City in Hormozgan province, Iran

Fareghan Persian: فارغان
- City
- Location within Iran
- Coordinates: 28°00′34″N 56°15′12″E
- Country: Iran
- Province: Hormozgan
- County: Hajjiabad
- District: Fareghan

Population (2016)
  - Total: 1,773
- Time zone: UTC+3:30 (IRST)

Fareghan (Persian: فارغان) (Note: Also romanized as Faraghān, Fāreghān, and Fārghān; also known as Faraqān) is a city in, and the capital of, Fareghan District of Hajjiabad County, Hormozgan province, Iran. It also serves as the administrative center for Fareghan Rural District.

== Demographics ==
=== Population ===
At the time of the 2006 National Census, the city's population was 1,862 in 491 households. The following census in 2011 counted 1,925 people in 561 households. The 2016 census measured the population of the city as 1,773 people in 586 households.
