= Shahrud, Hormozgan =

Village in Hormozgan province, Iran

Shahrud Persian: شاهرود
- Village
- Location within Iran
- Coordinates: 28°01′58″N 56°21′26″E
- Country: Iran
- Province: Hormozgan
- County: Hajjiabad
- District: Fareghan
- Rural District: Fareghan

Population (2016)
  - Total: 408
- Time zone: UTC+3:30 (IRST)

Shahrud (Persian: شاهرود) (Note: Also romanized as Shahrood and Shāhrūd; also known as Shāhrūd-e Fāreghān) is a village in Fareghan Rural District of Fareghan District, Hajjiabad County, Hormozgan province, Iran.

== Demographics ==
=== Population ===
At the time of the 2006 National Census, the village's population was 494 in 105 households. The following census in 2011 counted 445 people in 131 households. The 2016 census measured the population of the village as 408 people in 127 households. It was the most populous village in its rural district.
