= 2014 Jinggu earthquake =

Earthquake in China

- Location within Yunnan
- UTC time: 2014-10-07 13:49:39
- ISC event: 605504658
- USGS-ANSS: ComCat
- Local date: October 7, 2014
- Local time: 21:49 UTC+8
- Magnitude: M_{s} 6.6 (CENC) M_{w} 6.0 (USGS) M_{w} 6.1 (EMSC)
- Depth: 5 kilometres (3 mi)(CENC) 10.9 kilometres (7 mi)(USGS)
- Epicenter: 23.4°N 100.5°E
- Areas affected: China
- Casualties: 1 dead, 324 injured (as of October 08, 2014)

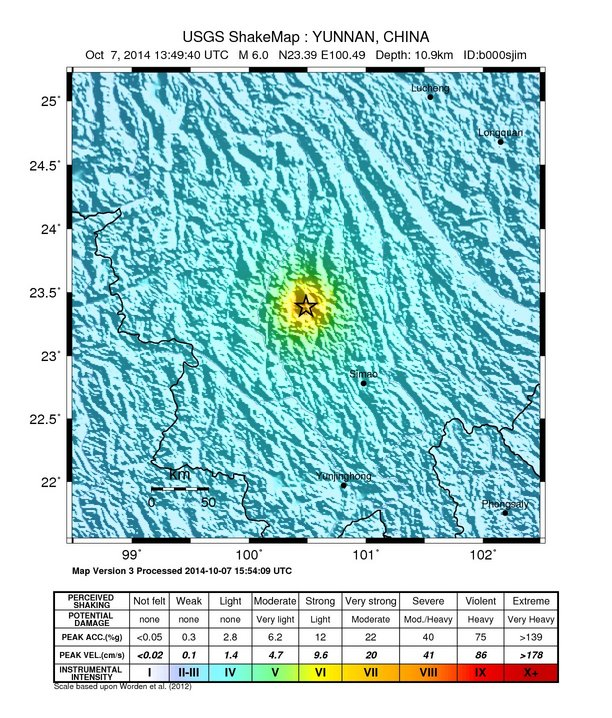
Shake map of the earthquake in Jinggu, Yunnan, China on October 07, 2014

The 2014 Jinggu earthquake occurred on October 7, 2014, at 21:49 (UTC+8).

== Details ==
The epicenter was located in Jinggu, Pu'er, Yunnan, People's Republic of China. The earthquake killed at least 1 person and injured at least 324 others. The magnitude of the earthquake was placed at M_{s} 6.6 by the China Earthquake Data Center with a focal depth of 5.0 kilometres (12 mi). It was measured at M_{w} 6.0 by the United States Geological Survey with a focal depth of 10.9 kilometres (6.7 mi) and M_{w} 6.1 by the European Alert System.

== Effects and relief efforts ==
As of October 9, 2014, Jinggu had centralized resettlement of 37,000 people, received 13,000 tents and 2,300 quilts. The earthquake damaged 7 reservoirs to varying degrees: the largest Changhai reservoir sprouted bad leaks. High voltage power lines were repaired, tap water supply returned to normal, and village roads were opening.

== See also ==
- List of earthquakes in 2014
- List of earthquakes in China
