= Barud =

Barud برود
- Village
- Location within Iran
- Coordinates: 35°34′49″N 59°53′06″E
- Country: Iran
- Province: Razavi Khorasan
- County: Fariman
- Bakhsh: Qalandarabad
- Rural District: Qalandarabad

Population (2006)
  - Total: 67
- Time zone: UTC+3:30 (IRST)
  - Summer (DST): UTC+4:30 (IRDT)

Barud (Persian: برود, also Romanized as Barūd and Bar Rūd) is a village in Qalandarabad Rural District, Qalandarabad District, Fariman County, Razavi Khorasan Province, Iran. At the 2006 census, its population was 67, in 17 families.
