= Siruiyeh, Kerman =

Siruiyeh سيروييه
- Village
- Location within Iran
- Coordinates: 29°40′03″N 56°19′48″E
- Country: Iran
- Province: Kerman
- County: Sirjan
- Bakhsh: Central
- Rural District: Chahar Gonbad

Population (2006)
  - Total: 70
- Time zone: UTC+3:30 (IRST)
  - Summer (DST): UTC+4:30 (IRDT)

Siruiyeh (Persian: سيروييه, also Romanized as Sīrū’īyeh and Sīrūyeh) is a village in Chahar Gonbad Rural District, in the Central District of Sirjan County, Kerman Province, Iran. At the 2006 census, its population was 70, in 20 families.
