= Meymand, Razavi Khorasan =

Meymand ميمند
- Village
- Location within Iran
- Coordinates: 34°09′00″N 58°31′00″E
- Country: Iran
- Province: Razavi Khorasan
- County: Gonabad
- Bakhsh: Kakhk
- Rural District: Kakhk

Population (2006)
  - Total: 17
- Time zone: UTC+3:30 (IRST)
  - Summer (DST): UTC+4:30 (IRDT)

Meymand (Persian: ميمند) is a village in Kakhk Rural District, Kakhk District, Gonabad County, Razavi Khorasan Province, Iran. At the 2006 census, its population was 17, in 4 families.
