= Bar Rud, Razavi Khorasan =

Bar Rud بررود
- Village
- Location within Iran
- Coordinates: 35°52′10″N 59°30′54″E
- Country: Iran
- Province: Razavi Khorasan
- County: Mashhad
- Bakhsh: Ahmadabad
- Rural District: Sarjam

Population (2017)
  - Total: 130
- Time zone: UTC+3:30 (IRST)
  - Summer (DST): UTC+4:30 (IRDT)

Bar Rud (Persian: بررود, also Romanized as Bar Rūd; also known as Varrūd) is a village in Sarjam Rural District, Ahmadabad District, Mashhad County, Razavi Khorasan Province, Iran. At the 2006 census, its population was 130, in 32 families.

== See also ==
- List of cities, towns and villages in Razavi Khorasan Province
