= Bar Rud, Ahmadi =

Bar Rud بررود
- Village
- Location within Iran
- Coordinates: 27°55′42″N 56°40′35″E
- Country: Iran
- Province: Hormozgan
- County: Hajjiabad
- Bakhsh: Ahmadi
- Rural District: Ahmadi

Population (2006)
  - Total: 154
- Time zone: UTC+3:30 (IRST)
  - Summer (DST): UTC+4:30 (IRDT)

Bar Rud (Persian: بررود, also Romanized as Bar Rūd) is a village in Ahmadi Rural District, Ahmadi District, Hajjiabad County, Hormozgan Province, Iran. At the 2006 census, its population was 154, in 35 families.
