= Narmand, Kerman =

Narmand نارمند
- Village
- Location within Iran
- Coordinates: 28°11′21″N 57°03′17″E
- Country: Iran
- Province: Kerman
- County: Faryab
- Bakhsh: Central
- Rural District: Hur

Population (2006)
  - Total: 193
- Time zone: UTC+3:30 (IRST)
  - Summer (DST): UTC+4:30 (IRDT)

Narmand (Persian: نارمند, also Romanized as Nārmand; also known as Nārvand) is a village in Hur Rural District, in the Central District of Faryab County, Kerman Province, Iran. At the 2006 census, its population was 193, in 37 families.
