= Global Centroid Moment Tensor =

The Global Centroid Moment Tensor (GCMT) is a seismological and geophysical database of locations and source parameters for globally recorded earthquakes larger than magnitude 5.0. GCMT's primary goals are determination of moment tensors for major earthquakes globally and quick dissemination of results. The GCMT database contains more than 25,000 moment tensors for major earthquakes since 1976.

GCMT is overseen by Göran Ekström and Meredith Nettles at the American Lamont–Doherty Earth Observatory. GCMT was initially established under Harvard University where it was called the Harvard CMT Project in 1982–2006. The GCMT database is considered a trusted source and staple for the geophysical community.
