= Little Sitkin Island =

Island in Alaska, United States

Coordinates: 51°56′55″N 178°30′15″E

Location in Alaska

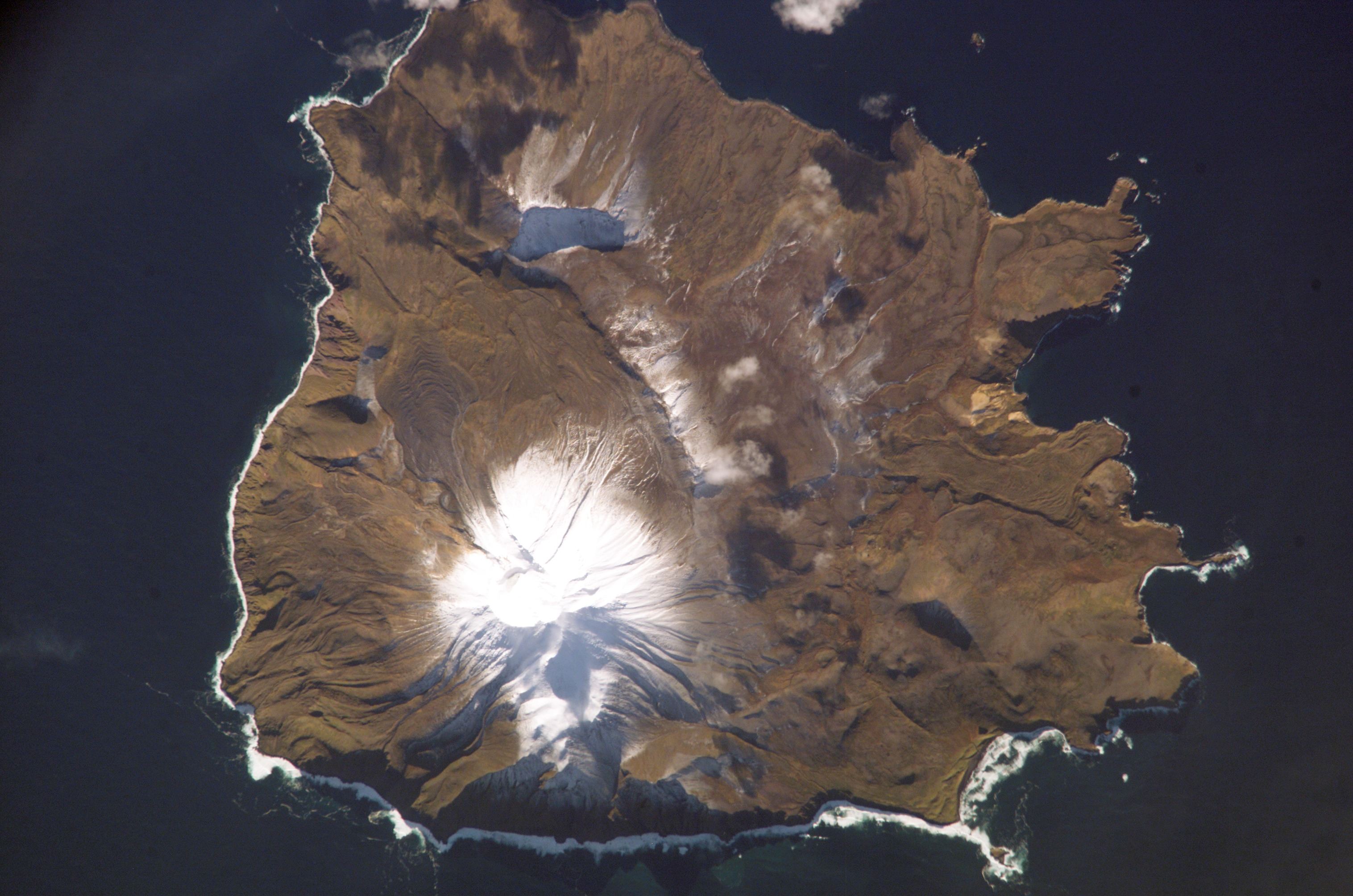
NASA photo of Little Sitkin.

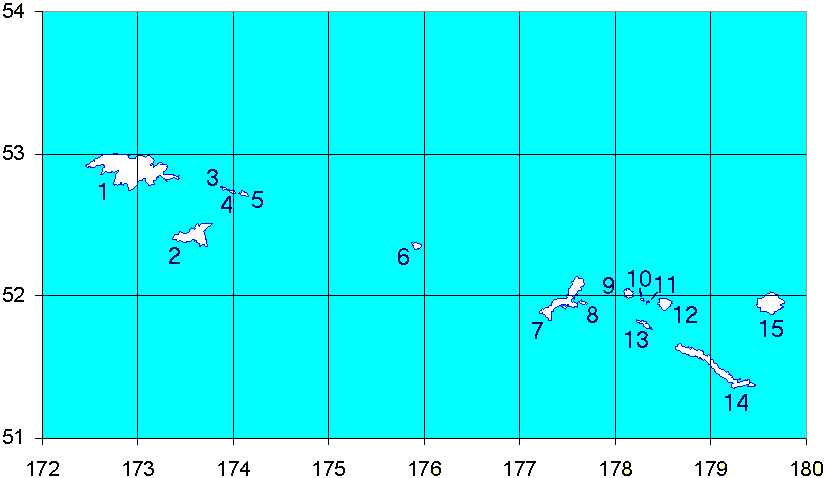
12 – Little Sitkin.

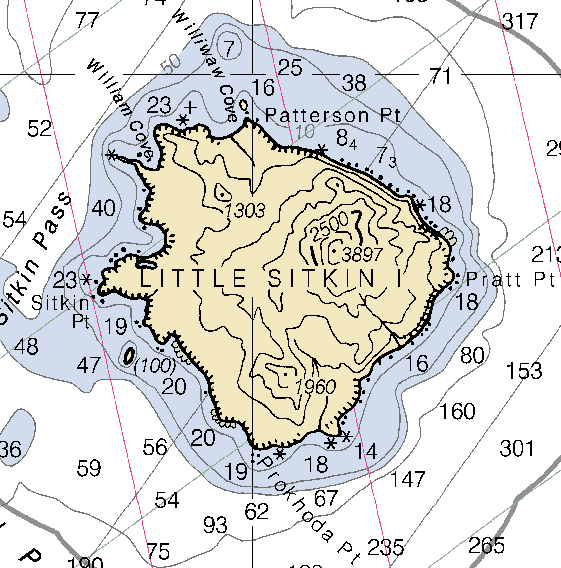
Little Sitkin Nautical Chart.

Little Sitkin Island (Aleut: Sitignax̂; Russian: Малый Ситкин) is a volcanic island in the Rat Islands archipelago of the Western Aleutian Islands, Alaska, about 3 miles (4.8 km) east of Davidof Island. Great Sitkin Island (which is essentially the same size as Little Sitkin) lies 185 miles (298 km) further east in the Andreanof Islands.

Little Sitkin is roughly circular and about 6 miles (9.7 km) in diameter. The interior is extremely rugged and mountainous; only the lower slopes are grass covered. There are two prominent peaks, one 3,898 feet (1,188 m) high in the northeast part of the island and the other 1,960 feet (600 m) high in the southern part. Numerous streams are on the island but no lakes or ponds. The coast is generally bold, rocky, and precipitous, with a fringe of kelp 200 to 400 yards (180 to 370 m) wide. Small steam jets and hot springs are in the valley at the head of William Cove on the northwest of the island.

== Volcano ==
Little Sitkin is a stratovolcano that erupted circa 1776, 1828 and 1900. The 1776 eruption shows signs of being explosive. The volcano has had three cone building episodes separated by the formation of two calderas. A summit crater caps the youngest cone, about 3 miles (4.8 km) in diameter at the base.

The active stratovolcano on Little Sitkin Island occurs within the eroded remnants of a nested double caldera of probable late Pleistocene age. The older caldera (Caldera One) is about 4.8 km (3.0 miles) in diameter and is centered slightly northeast of the island's midpoint. The caldera formed at the site of a large stratovolcano, the remnants of which are the oldest rocks exposed on the island.

A second stratovolcano was constructed almost entirely of lava flows within Caldera One and attained a height of about 900 m (3,000 feet). A cataclysmic eruption, possibly in early post-glacial time, resulted in the formation of a second, smaller caldera (Caldera Two) that partially destroyed this cone. Caldera Two is elliptical in outline and measures 2.7 by 4 km (1.7 by 2.5 miles); the inferred eastern and southern margins are coincident with those of Caldera One. Field relations suggest that the northern boundary of Caldera Two is a hinge along which a large block, comprising most of the Caldera One stratovolcano, was tilted southward during the caldera eruption. The highest peak on the island is on the post-caldera remnant of the second cone.

A deposit of partly welded tuff up to 100 m (330 feet) thick extends from the remnant cone northwest across the Caldera Two boundary fault, to slightly beyond the inferred location of the Caldera One boundary fault. The deposit is thought to have been emplaced by one or more pyroclastic flows, possibly associated with formation of Caldera Two.

Post-Caldera Two deposits are mainly lava flows. Two relatively recent aa flows have well-developed levees; one originated from the breached central crater of Little Sitkin volcano, and the other from a fissure along the western trace of the Caldera One boundary fault.

On June 23, 2014, a magnitude 7.9 earthquake struck near the island. Citizens were ordered to evacuate. Tsunami warnings were soon issued.

== Flora and fauna ==
Vegetation is mainly low leafy plants, moss, sedge and grass that grows extensively in altitudes below 1,500 feet (460 m), with very few woody plants. There has historically been a population of Arctic foxes, which numbered 250 in 1930, subsisting on echinoderms, snails, and insects. Small populations of sea birds and marine invertebrates have also been found.

== See also ==
- List of volcanoes in the United States
