= Ashkara Rural District =

Rural district in Hormozgan province, Iran

Ashkara Rural District Persian: دهستان آشكارا
- Rural District
- Location within Iran
- Coordinates: 28°06′02″N 56°04′09″E
- Country: Iran
- Province: Hormozgan
- County: Hajjiabad
- District: Fareghan
- Capital: Shamil-e Bala

Population (2016)
  - Total: 8,121
- Time zone: UTC+3:30 (IRST)

Ashkara Rural District (Persian: دهستان آشكارا) is in Fareghan District of Hajjiabad County, Hormozgan province, Iran. Its capital is the village of Shamil-e Bala.

== Demographics ==
=== Population ===
At the time of the 2006 National Census, the rural district's population was 8,003 in 1,950 households. There were 8,417 inhabitants in 2,345 households at the following census of 2011. The 2016 census measured the population of the rural district as 8,121 in 2,565 households. The most populous of its 16 villages was Shamil-e Bala, with 3,028 people.
