= Fareghan Rural District =

Rural district in Hormozgan province, Iran

Fareghan Rural District Persian: دهستان فارغان
- Rural District
- Location within Iran
- Coordinates: 28°03′18″N 56°20′41″E
- Country: Iran
- Province: Hormozgan
- County: Hajjiabad
- District: Fareghan
- Capital: Fareghan

Population (2016)
  - Total: 2,492
- Time zone: UTC+3:30 (IRST)

Fareghan Rural District (Persian: دهستان فارغان) is in Fareghan District of Hajjiabad County, Hormozgan province, Iran. It is administered from the city of Fareghan.

== Demographics ==
=== Population ===
At the time of the 2006 National Census, the rural district's population was 3,159 in 829 households. There were 2,729 inhabitants in 860 households at the following census of 2011. The 2016 census measured the population of the rural district as 2,492 in 864 households. The most populous of its 14 villages was Shahrud, with 408 people.
