= Fareghan District =

District in Hormozgan province, Iran

Fareghan District Persian: بخش فارغان
- District
- Location within Iran
- Coordinates: 28°06′02″N 56°10′28″E
- Country: Iran
- Province: Hormozgan
- County: Hajjiabad
- Capital: Fareghan

Population (2016)
  - Total: 12,386
- Time zone: UTC+3:30 (IRST)

Fareghan District (Persian: بخش فارغان) is in Hajjiabad County, Hormozgan province, Iran. Its capital is the city of Fareghan.

== Demographics ==
=== Population ===
At the time of the 2006 National Census, the district's population was 13,024 in 3,270 households. The following census in 2011 counted 13,071 people in 3,766 households. The 2016 census measured the population of the district as 12,386 inhabitants in 4,015 households.

=== Administrative divisions ===
Fareghan District Population
Administrative Divisions	2006	2011	2016
Ashkara RD	8,003	8,417	8,121
Fareghan RD	3,159	2,729	2,492
Fareghan (city)	1,862	1,925	1,773
Total	13,024	13,071	12,386
RD = Rural District
