= Mabroom =

Date palm cultivar

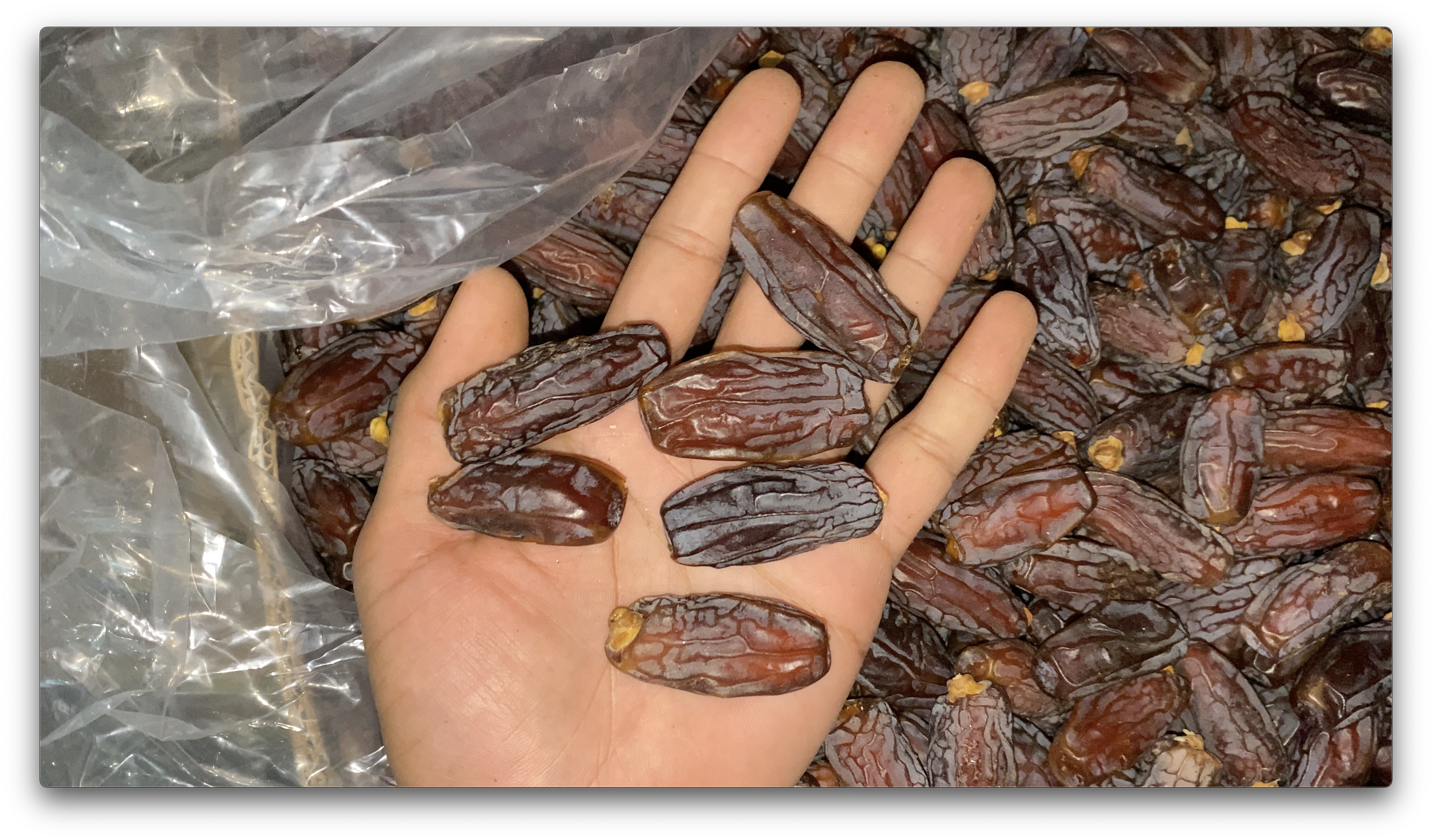
- Mabroom dates
- Genus: Phoenix
- Species: Phoenix dactylifera
- Origin: Saudi Arabia

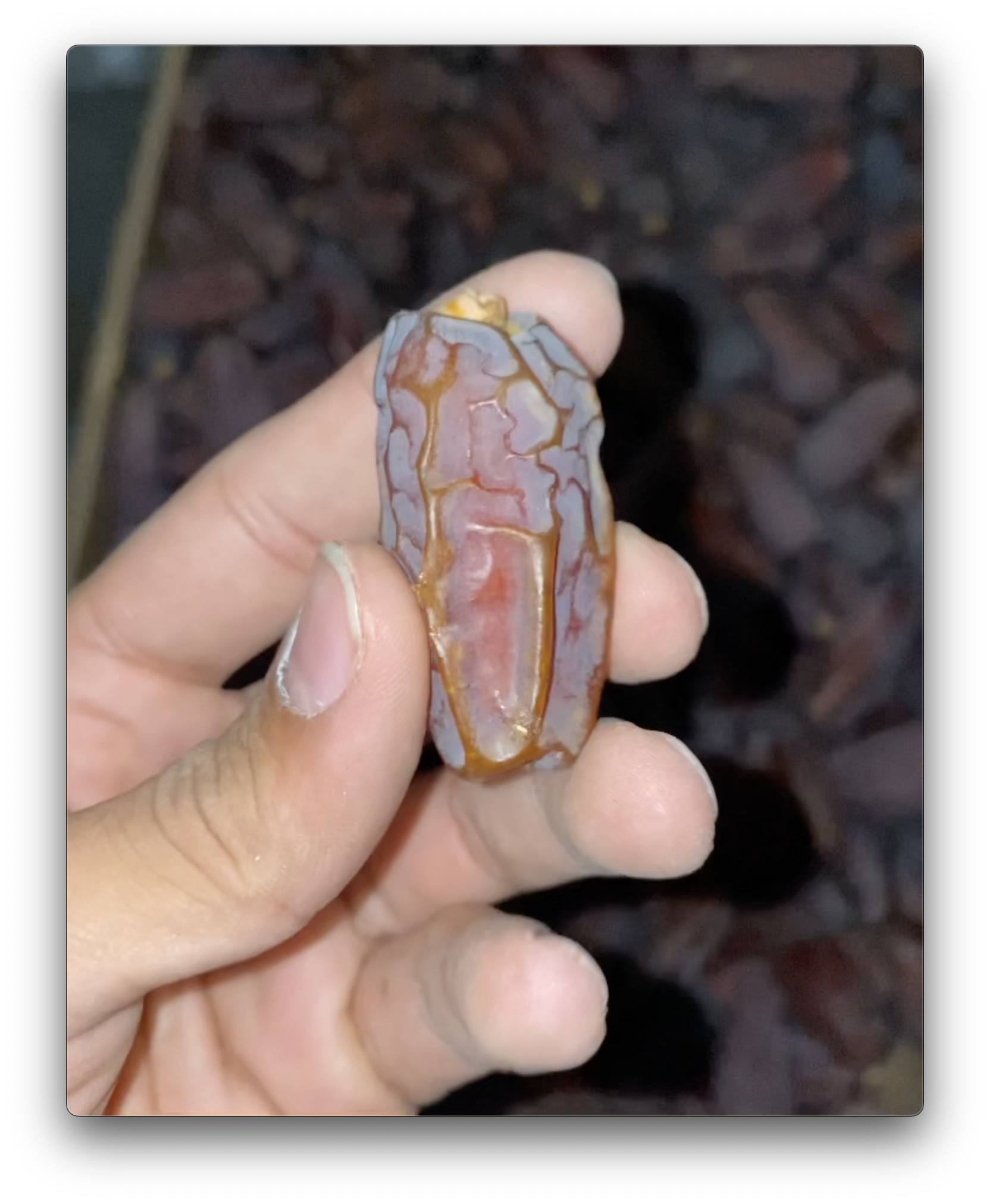
Mabroom dates

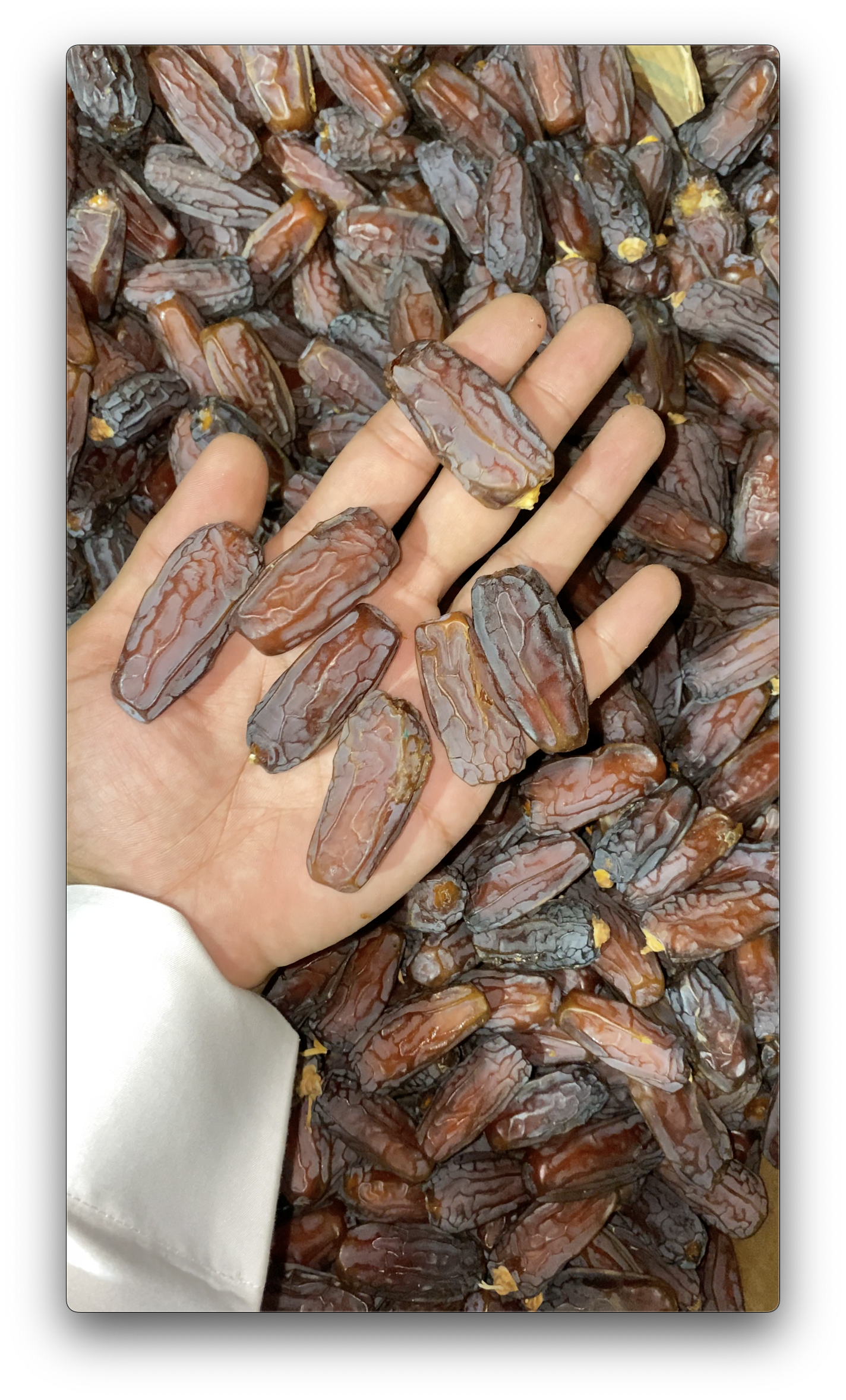
Mabroom dates

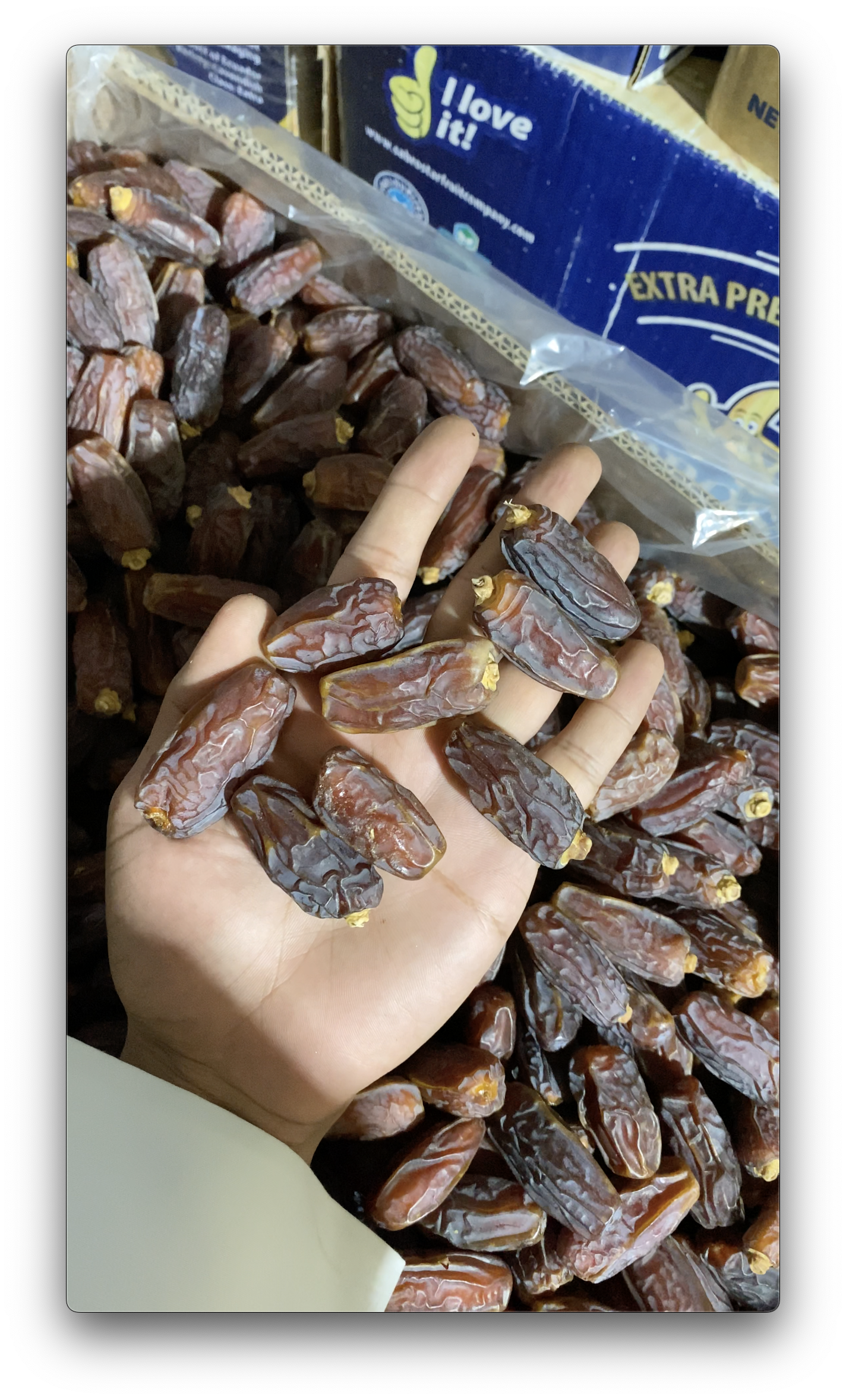
Mabroom dates

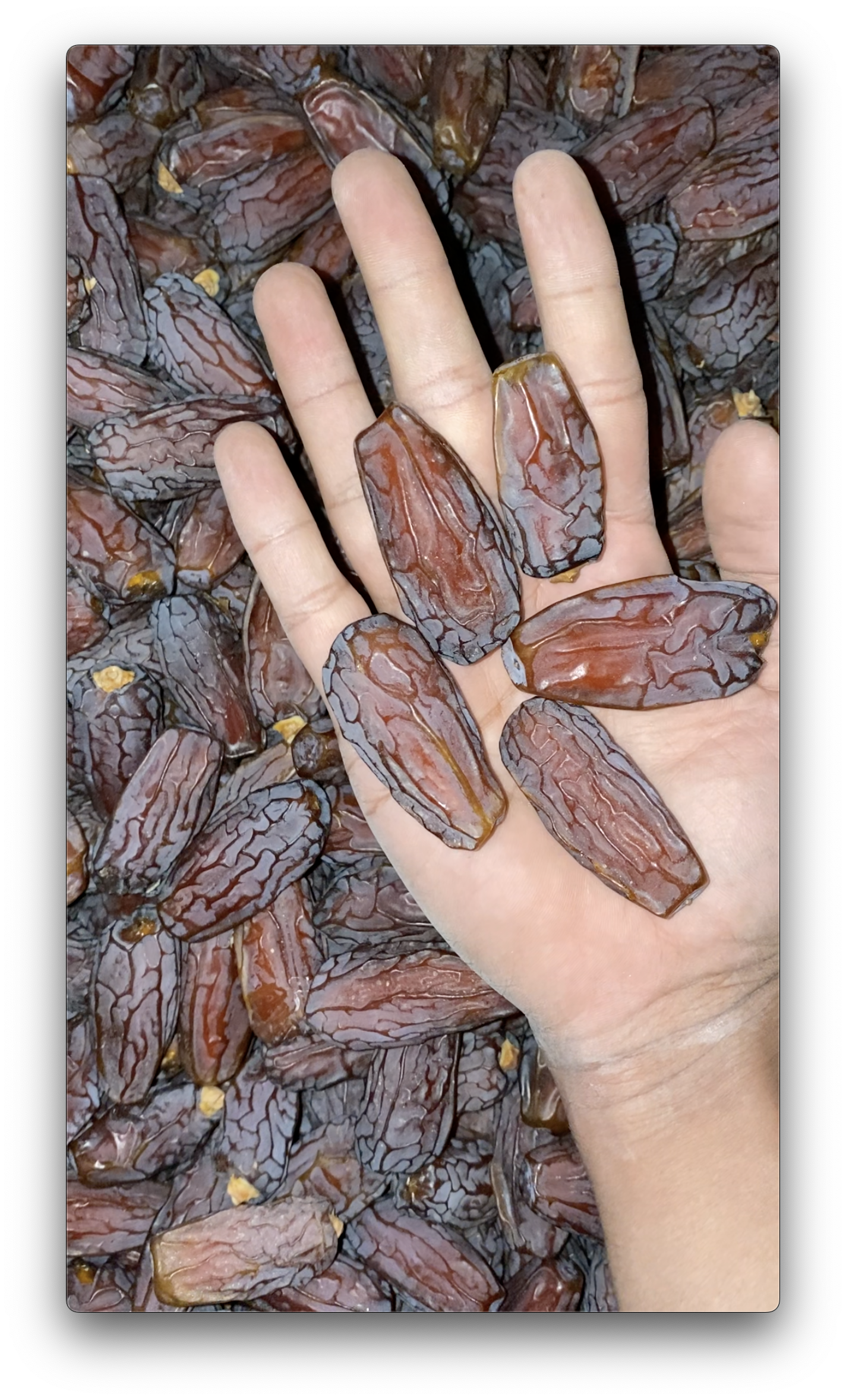
Mabroom dates

Mabroom (Arabic: مبروم; also spelled Mabroum or Mabrum) is a cultivar of the palm date that is widely grown in Saudi Arabia. It produces a large, elongated date similar to the Piarom cultivar.

== See also ==
- List of date cultivars
