= Piarom =

Date palm cultivar

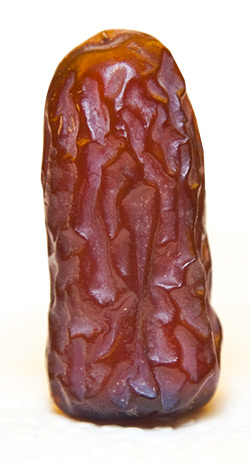
- Genus: Phoenix
- Species: Phoenix dactylifera
- Origin: Iran

Piarom (Persian: پیارم) is a cultivar of the palm date originating from southern Iran. It is large, with thin, black-brown skin. It is one of the semi-dry date varieties.

Many Piarom dates are produced in the vicinity of Hajjiabad, Hormozgan in southern Iran.

== See also ==
- Barhee
- Mazafati
- Mabroom
