= Divodasa =

Tribal King of the Bharatas

Divodāsa Atithigva
- Rājā

Rājā of the Bharatas
- Reign: 17th century BCE
- Predecessor: Vadhryaśva
- Successor: Sudās
- Issue: Sudās, Pijavana?
- Dynasty: Bharata
- Father: Vadhryaśva

Divodāsa Atithigva, was an Indo-Aryan, king of the Bharatas during the main or middle Rigvedic period (celebrated for his liberality and protected by Indra and the Ashvins in the Rigveda, RV 1.112.14; 1.116.18), the son of Vadhryaśva RV 6.61.5. Further, the Mandala 9 of Rigveda mentions Divodasa thus: "[Indra] Smote swiftly forts, and Sambara, then Yadu and that Turvasha, for pious Divodasa's sake." RV 9.61.2.

Another telling of the same conflict with Sambara from Mandala 4 names him with the epithet of Atithigva, as shown: "I [Indra], in my exhilaration, broke apart all at once the nine and ninety fortresses of Śambara, and the hundredth, his dwelling place, to complete it, when I helped Divodāsa Atithigva." RV 4.26.3.

He is the father of the famous king Sudas (RV 7.18.25) (of the Battle of the Ten Kings). Pijavana is the other name of Divodasa according to Rigveda according to scholar Singhal Gupta et.al. While Witzel and most scholars believes that Pijavana was an intermediate generation between Sudās and Divodasa, who was likely not a regent.

== See also ==
- Sudas
- Shambara
