= Purus =

Purus and Purús may refer to:

== Places and jurisdictions in the Amazon basin ==
- Purus River or Rio Purús, a tributary of the Amazon River in South America
- Purús Communal Reserve, in Peru
- Purús District, in Purús Province, Peru
- Purús Province, in Peru
- Purus National Forest, in Amazonas, Brazil

== Other ==
- Latin for pure, as in Actus purus
- plural of Puru (Vedic tribe)

== See also ==
- Purussaurus, a prehistoric reptile
- Puru (disambiguation)
