= Bharatas (Vedic tribe) =

Tribe mentioned in the Regveda

- Ethnicity: Indo-Aryan
- Location: Northern Indian subcontinent
- Parent tribe: Puru (originally)
- Branches: Tr̥tsu. Sr̥ñjaya
- Language: Vedic Sanskrit
- Religion: Historical Vedic religion

The Bharatas were an early Vedic tribe that existed in the latter half of the second millennium B.C.E. The earliest mentioned location of the Bharatas was on the Sarasvatī River. Led by the tribal king Divodāsa, the Bharatas moved through the Hindu Kush mountains and defeated Śambara. Divodāsa's descendant, Sudās, won the Battle of the Ten Kings against a Pūru-led coalition, after which the initial compilation of hymns of the R̥gveda was carried out. After the battle, the Bharatas and other Pūru clans eventually formed the Kuru kingdom, which was the first attested state in Indian history.

== Etymology ==
The name Bharata is of Indo-Aryan and Indo-Iranian origin, meaning "bearers" or "carriers".

== History ==
Two Bharatas, Devaśravas Bhārata and Devavāta Bhārata, are mentioned as living near the Āpayā, Sarasvatī and Dr̥ṣadvatī rivers.

Devavāta's son, Sṛñjaya Daivavāta, defeated the Turvaśas, and is mentioned alongside Abhyāvartin Cāyamāna who defeated the Vṛcīvants under Varaśikha. These battles occurred at the Hariyūpiyā (modern Hali-āb) and Yavyāvatī rivers (modern Zhob). In a hymn to Sarasvatī, it is stated that she aided (or is sought to aid) Vadhryaśva in defeating niggards, foreigners, insulters of gods, haters, and the sons of Br̥saya. Witzel notes that the name Br̥saya is of non-Indo-Aryan origin, and Parpola proposes that the name came from the language of the Bactria–Margiana Archaeological Complex. He states that Br̥saya was a hereditary regnal title in the region, and that it existed even till the time of Alexander the Great. In addition, the poet expresses the desire not to leave the Sarasvatī river (modern Helmand and Arghandab). Both hymns mentioning the two are attributed to Bharadvāja Bārhaspatya.

Under the chieftain Divodāsa Atithigva, the Bharatas moved through the Hindu Kush mountain range, which borders the Indian subcontinent in the northwest. Divodāsa was adopted by Vadhryaśva after the former was given to him by the river goddess Sarasvatī. Divodāsa defeated the aboriginal mountain chief Śambara in the autumn of the fortieth year of campaigns, after destroying ninety-nine of the latter's forts. Under Divodāsa, the Bharatas were also enemies of the Yadu-Turvaśas. Divodāsa's allies were Prastoka, Aśvatha, and Sr̥ñjaya's son. Scholars differ on whether Sr̥ñjaya's son was a different person from Prastoka or Aśvatha. Several Rigvedic poets mention a patron-client relationship between Divodāsa and Bharadvāja. According to a hymn attributed to Suhotra Bhāradvāja, Bharadvāja was involved in Divodāsa's battles with Śambara. In another hymn, Garga Bhāradvāja enumerates the gifts that were donated to the Bharadvajas by Divodāsa and his allies, of which included part of the booty that was looted from Śambara.

Under Sudās Paijavana (a descendant of Divodāsa) and his purohita Viśvāmitra Gāthina, the Bharatas crossed the Vipāś and Śutudrī rivers (modern Beas and Sutlej). Eventually Viśvāmitra was replaced by Vasiṣṭha Maitrāvaruṇi.

=== Battle of the Ten Kings ===
Under Sudās and Vasiṣṭha, the Tṛtsu-Bharatas win the Battle of the Ten Kings. The first phase of the battle took place on the banks of the Paruṣnī river (modern Ravi) near Mānuṣa, west of Kurukṣetra. The principal antagonist is doubtful (Note: Karl Friedrich Geldner deemed it to be Bheda, incorrectly. Witzel proposes Trasadasyu. Palihawadana proposes Purukutsa, Trasadasyu's father.) and names of the participating tribes are difficult to retrieve, in light of the phonological deformations of their names. Plausible belligerents of the tribal union include (in order) — Pūrus (erstwhile master-tribe of Bharatas), Yadu (probably commanded by Turvaśa), Yakṣu (relatively unimportant or a pun for Yadu), Matsyas, Druhyus, Pakthas, Bhalānas, Alinas, Viṣāṇins, Śivas, Vaikarṇa, and Anu.

Though seemingly an unequal battle, going by the numbers (this aspect is highlighted multiple times in the hymns), Sudās decisively won against the tribal alliance by strategic breaching of a (natural) dyke on the river thereby drowning most (?) of the opponents; the victory is attributed to the benevolence and strategizing of Indra, the patron-God of Bharatas, whose blessings were secured by Vasiṣṭha's poetics.

Thereafter, the battleground (probably) shifted to the banks of river Yamunā, wherein the local chieftain Bheda was defeated along with three other tribes — Ajas, Śighras, and the Yakṣus.

==== Aftermath ====
The Battle of the Ten Kings led Bharatas to occupy the entire Pūru territory (Western Punjab) centered around Sarasvatī River and complete their east-ward migration. Sudās celebrated his victory with the Aśvamedha ritual to commemorate the establishment of a realm, free of enemies from the north, east, and west. He still had enemies in the Khāṇḍava Forest to the south, which was inhabited by the despised non-Indo-Aryan Kīkaṭas

A political realignment between Pūrus and Bharatas probably followed soon enough and might have included other factions of the tribal union as well; this is exhibited from how the core collection of Rigveda prominently features clan-hymns of both the sides.

There is no clear mention of Sudās' descendants or any succeeding Bharata king in the Rigveda. The Bharatas eventually evolve into the Kuru kingdom; however, there is no record of this development due to the time gap between the R̥gveda and other Vedas.

== Legacy in later literature ==
In the epic Mahabharata, the ancestor of Kurus becomes Emperor Bharata, and his rule and empire is called Bhārata. The Bharata clan mentioned in Mahabharata is a Kuru clan which is a sub clan of the Puru clan who were the cousins of the Yadavas. "Bhārata" today is an official name of the Republic of India.

== See also ==
- Vedas
- Vedic period
- Puru (Vedic tribe)
- Yadava
- Janapada
- Rigvedic rivers
- Historical Vedic religion
- History of Hinduism
- Indus Valley Civilisation
- Outline of ancient India
- Pottery in the Indian subcontinent
- List of ancient Indo-Aryan peoples and tribes

== Notes ==
=== Bibliography ===
- Kulke, Hermann; Rothermund, Dietmar (2016). A History of India (6 ed.). Routledge. ISBN 978-1-138-96114-2.
- Jamison, Stephanie; Brereton, Joel (2014). The Rigveda: The Earliest Religious Poetry of India. Oxford University Press.
- Palihawadana, Mahinda (2017). "The Indra Cult as Ideology: A Clue to Power Struggle in an Ancient Society". Electronic Journal of Vedic Studies. 24 (2): 19–166. doi:10.11588/ejvs.2017.2.2667.
- Witzel, Michael (1995a). "Ṛgvedic history: poets, chieftains and polities". In Erdosy, George (ed.). The Indo-Aryans of Ancient South Asia: Language, Material Culture and Ethnicity. De Gruyter.
- Witzel, Michael (1999). "Aryan and non-Aryan Names in Vedic India. Data for the linguistic situation, c. 1900–500 B.C". In Bronkhorst, J.; Deshpande, M. (eds.). Aryans and Non-Non-Aryans, Evidence, Interpretation and Ideology. Vol. 3. Harvard Oriental Series, Opera Minora.
