= Puru =

Puru may refer to:

== People ==
- Puru (Vedic tribe), a tribe or confederation of tribes mentioned many times in the Rigveda
- Chen Puru (1918–1998), communist Chinese politician
- Hohepa Puru (born 2002), Australian rugby league footballer
- Kira Puru, 21st century Australian musician
- Mike Puru (born 1975), New Zealand television personality, radio host and weather presenter
- Puru Chibber (born 1990), Indian actor
- Purushottam Puru Dadheech (born 1939), Indian Kathak dancer, choreographer and professor
- Puru Raaj Kumar (born 1970), Indian actor
- Puru (artist) (1896–1963), also known as Pu Xinyu, traditional Chinese painter, calligrapher and nobleman, cousin of Puyi, China's last emperor

== Other uses ==
- Puru (legendary king), a Hindu king in the Rigveda and Mahabharata
- Puru, Estonia, a village
- Puru, a tributary of the Vaser River in Romania

== See also ==
- Te Puru, New Zealand, a locality
- Porus (disambiguation)
- Purus (disambiguation)
- Puru and Yadu Dynasties
