= Sudas =

Tribal king of the Bhāratas

Raja of the Bharatas and Tritsu
- Reign: 14th century BCE
- Predecessor: Divodasa?
- Spouse: Sudevī
- Dynasty: Bharata
- Father: Pijavana or Divodasa
- Religion: Historical Vedic Religion

Sudās Pijavana was an Indo-Aryan tribal king of the Bharatas during the main or middle Rigvedic period (c. 14th century BCE). He led his tribe to victory in the Battle of the Ten Kings near the Paruṣṇī (modern Ravi River) in Punjab, defeating an alliance of the powerful Puru tribe with other tribes, for which he was eulogized by his purohita Vashistha in a hymn of the Rigveda. His victory established the ascendency of the Bhārata clan, allowing them to move eastwards and settle in Kurukshetra, paving the way for the emergence of the Kuru "super-tribe" or tribal union, which dominated northern India in the subsequent period.

== Family ==
Sudās' ancestors include Pijavana, Divodāsa Atithigva, and Devavant, although scholars disagree regarding the order of these ancestors chronologically. According to Witzel, Divodāsa was the father of Sudās, but he includes Pijavana on the grid of Bharata descent as a possible ancestor between Divodāsa and Sudās. Palihawadana also places Pijavana on his grid of Bharata descent between Divodāsa and Sudas, but only states that Sudās was a descendant of Pijavana.

He was married to Sudevī, who is stated to have been given to Sudās by the Ashvins.

== Rigveda ==
Sudas is mentioned in Rigveda as the chief of Bharatas who conquered the ten-kings confederacy. It is further mentioned that the king had replaced Vishwamitra with Vasishtha as his priest, thereby creating a rivalry between the two. The ten-kings, viz. Puru, Yadu, Turvasu, Anu, Druhyu, Alina, Paktha, Bhalanas, Siva and Vishanin, then revolted against Sudas but were defeated by him. He also fought Ajas, Sigrus and Yakshus soon after.

== See also ==
- Divodasa
- Parikshit
- Sudakshina
- Krishna
