= Names of India =

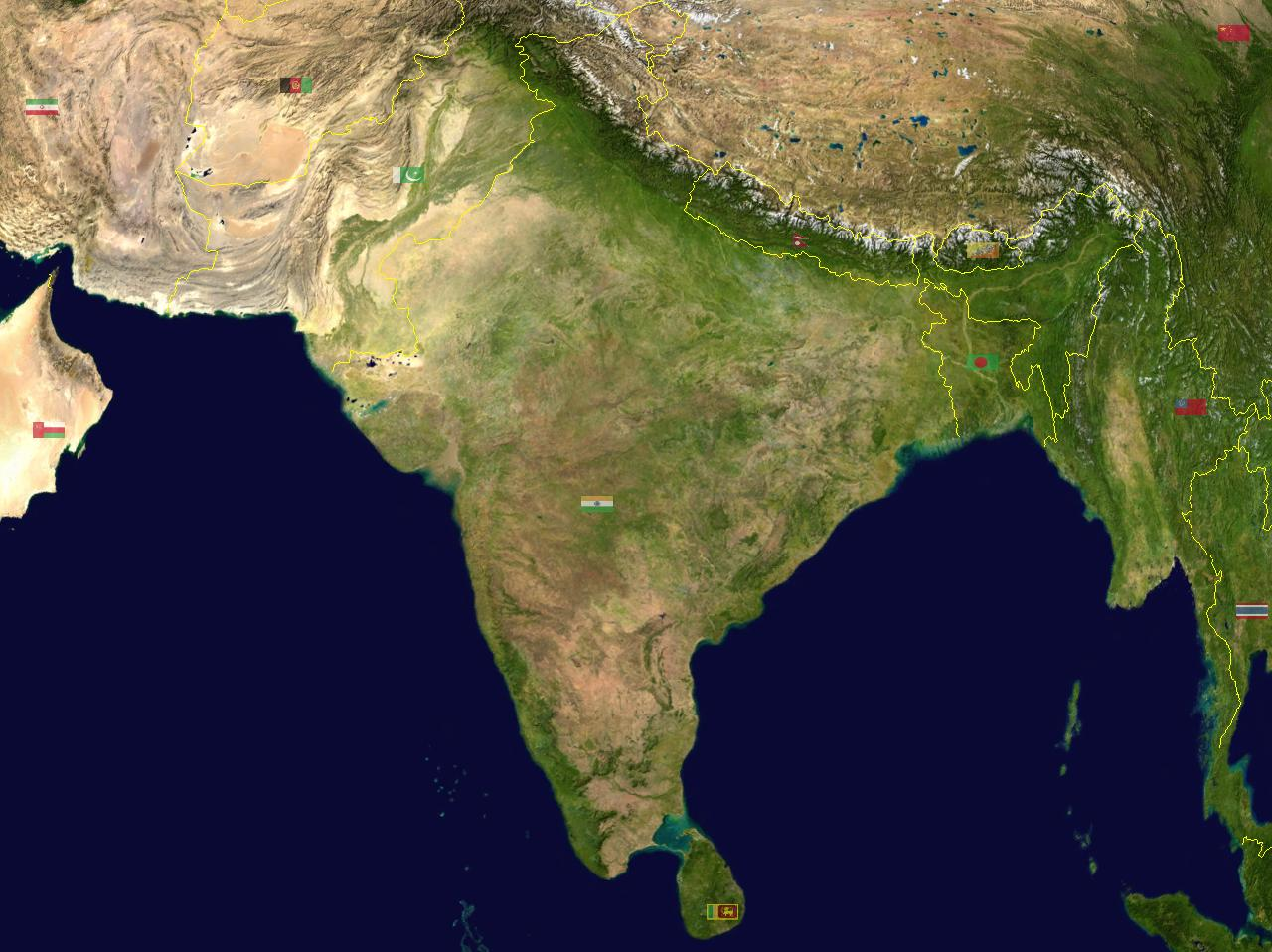
Relief map of the Indian subcontinent, centred on the Republic of India.

The Republic of India is principally known by two official short names: India and Bharat. As per Article 300 of the Constitution of India, the Government of India may be referred to as the Union of India in legal proceedings. An unofficial third name is Hindustan or Hindostan, which is widely used throughout North India. Although these names now refer to the modern country in most contexts, they historically denoted the broader Indian subcontinent.

== Overview ==
"India" (Greek: Ἰνδία) is a name derived from the Indus River and remains the country's common name in the Western world, having been used by the ancient Greeks to refer to the lands east of Persia and south of the Himalayas. This name appeared in Old English by the 9th century and re-emerged in Modern English in the 17th century.

The earliest known epigraphical attestations of the name Bharata occurs in the Hāthigumphā inscription of King Kharavela (2nd-1st century BCE), a Jain inscription at Udayagiri Caves, near Bhubaneswar in Odisha. The inscription, which records Kharavela's military campaigns, contains a reference to Bharatavarsha, indicating that the term was already in use as a cultural or territorial designation in ancient India.

According to Jain tradition, the name "Bharatavarsha" derives from Emperor Bharata, the eldest son of the first Tirthankara, Rishabhdeva (also named Adinatha or Ikshvāku). Jain texts describe Bharata as a universal monarch (chakravartin), after whom the land was named. This association between Bharata and the territorial name "Bharatavarsha" is a recurring theme in Jain literature.

According to the Vedic tradition, "Bharat" (Hindi: भारत) is the shortened form of the name "Bharatavarsha" in the Sanskrit language. It originates from the Vedic period and is rooted in the Dharmic religions, particularly Hinduism. The long-form Sanskrit name is derived from the Bharata tribe, who are mentioned in the Rigveda as one of the principal peoples of Aryavarta, which roughly corresponds with the Indo-Gangetic Plain. The initial application of the name referred only to the western part of the Gangetic Valley. In 1949, the Constituent Assembly of India adopted "Bharat" (alongside "India") as one of the country's two official short names, by even explicitly rejecting "Hindustan" (at least as an official name).

"Hindustan" (Persian: هندوستان) is also a name derived from the Indus River, combining "Hindu" (Indus) as an exonym with the suffix "-stan" (land) in the Persian language. It has been the most common Persian name for India since at least the 3rd century, with the earlier form "Hindush" (an adaptation of the Sanskrit name "Sindhu") being attested in Old Persian as early as the 6th century BCE, when it was used to refer to the lands east of the Persian frontier in the Indus Valley. However, the name did not become particularly widespread in other languages until the 11th century, when it was popularised during the Muslim period in the Indian subcontinent. While it is no longer used in an official capacity, "Hindustan" is still a common name for India in the Hindustani language.

== India ==
India was the lower Indus basin in Herodotus's view of the world.

The English term is from Greek Indikē (cf. Megasthenes' work Indica) or Indía (Ἰνδία), via Latin transliteration India.

The name derives from Sanskrit Sindhu, which was the name of the Indus River as well as the lower Indus Basin.

The Old Persian equivalent of Síndhu was Hindu. Darius I conquered Sindh in about 516 BCE, upon which the Persian equivalent Hinduš was used for the province at the lower Indus basin. Scylax of Caryanda who explored the Indus river for the Persian emperor probably took over the Persian name and passed it into Greek. The terms Indos for the Indus river as well as "an Indian" are found in Herodotus' Histories. The loss of the aspirate /h/ was probably due to the dialects of Greek spoken in Asia Minor. Herodotus also generalised the term "Indian" from the people of lower Indus basin, to all the people living to the east of Persia, even though he had no knowledge of the geography of the land.

By the time of Alexander the Great, Indía in Koine Greek denoted the region beyond the Indus. Alexander's companions were aware of at least India up to the Ganges delta (Gangaridai). Later, Megasthenes included in India the southern peninsula as well.

Megasthenes was a Greek ambassador in the Mauryan Empire court during the reign of Chandragupta Maurya and wrote a detailed account of his visit in Indica. He resided in the Mauryan capital of Pataliputra, noting that they surpassed in power and glory in all India.

They surpass in power and glory every other people, not only in this quarter, but one may say in all India, their capital being Palibothra, a very large and wealthy city, after which some call the people itself the Palibothri, - nay, even the whole tract along the Ganges. Their king has in his pay a standing army of 600,000 foot-soldiers, 30,000 cavalry, and 9000 elephants : whence may be formed some conjecture as to the vastness of his resources. Megasthenes, in Indica

Latin India is used by Lucian (2nd century CE). India was known in Old English language and was used in King Alfred's translation of Paulus Orosius. In Middle English, the name was, under French influence, replaced by Ynde or Inde, which entered Early Modern English as "Indie". The name "India" then came back to English usage from the 17th century onward, and may be due to the influence of Latin, or Spanish and Portuguese.

Sanskrit इन्दु॑ "drop (of Soma)", also a term for the Moon, is unrelated, but has sometimes been erroneously connected (see Middle Chinese 印度 for more).

== Indies ==
The term "Indies" refers to the land east on the Indus River. It is fully interchangeable with the word India. The Portuguese initially described the entire region they discovered as the Indies. Caribbean islands were initially described as "Indies" as they were thought to be India. When they became known to be in Western Hemisphere, they were renamed as West Indies. Thus, West Indies means India in the Western Hemisphere. Indonesia's former name is Dutch East Indies which means India in Southeast Asia (this should not be confused with Dutch India, which referred to the trading posts of VOC within the Indian subcontinent).

== Bharat ==
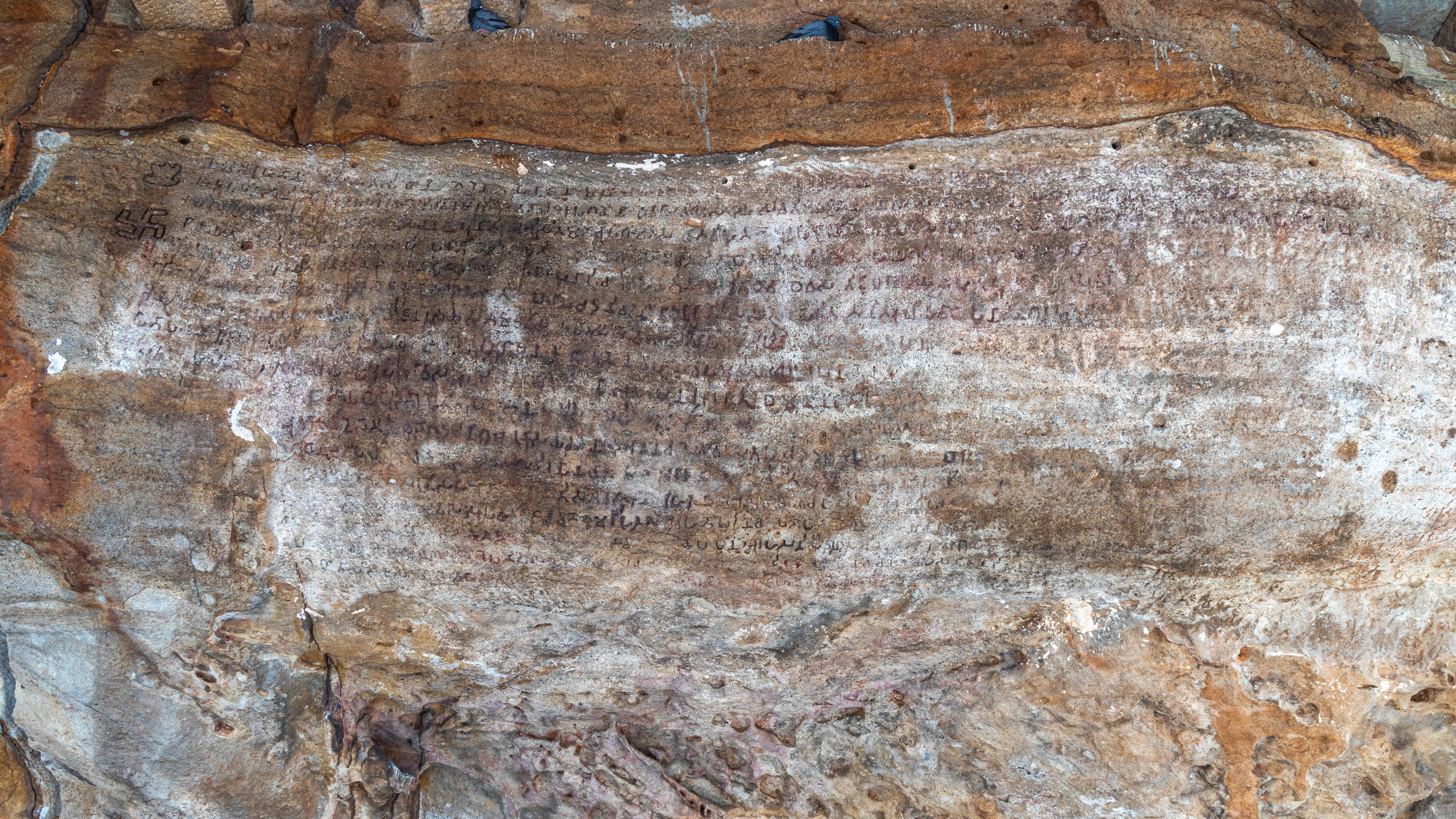
Hathigumpha Jain Inscription of King Kharavela (2nd century BCE), which contains the earliest known epigraphical reference to "Bharat".

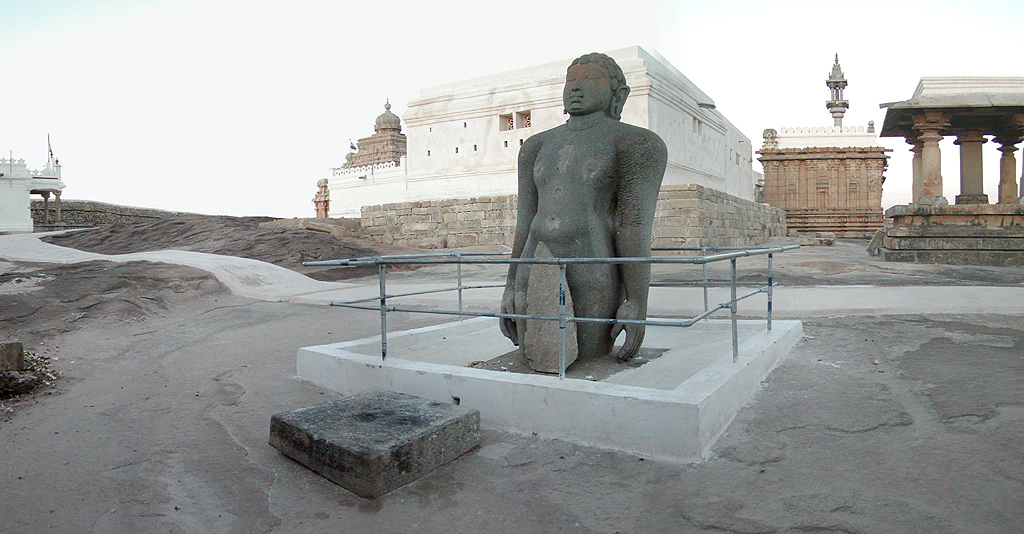
An ancient idol of Bharata Chakravarti at Shravanabelagola Jain temple, near the resting site Chandragupta Maurya.

Bharat is a coequal name of India, as set down in Article 1 of the Constitution, adopted in 1950, which states in English: "India, that is Bharat, ..." Bharat, which was predominantly used in Sanskrit, was adopted as a self-ascribed alternative name by some people of the Indian subcontinent and the Republic of India.

The Sanskrit word Bhārata is a vrddhi derivation of Bharata, which was originally an epithet of Agni. The term is a verbal noun of the Sanskrit root bhr-, "to bear/to carry", with a literal meaning of to be maintained (of fire). The root bhr- is cognate with the English verb 'to bear' and Latin ferō. This term also means "one who is engaged in search for knowledge". Barato, the Esperanto name for India, is also a derivation of Bhārata.

According to Vedic texts, Bharat is derived from the name of the Vedic community Bharatas, who are mentioned in the Rigveda as one of the original community of the Āryāvarta and notably participating in the Battle of the Ten Kings.

In the ancient Indian epic, the Mahabharata (200 BCE to 300 CE), a larger region of Indosphere is encompassed by the term Bharat. Some other Puranic passages refer to the same Bhārata people, who are described as the descendants of Dushyanta's son Bharata in the Mahabharata.

In the Puranas refer to the land that comprises India as Bhāratavarṣa (lit. 'Bharat mainland') and uses this term to distinguish it from other varṣas or continents. For example, the Vayu Purana says "he who conquers the whole of Bhāratavarṣa is celebrated as a samrāṭa". According to Jain tradition, Bhāratavarṣa in the Puranas – is named after Emperor Bharata, the son of Rishabhdeva the first Tirthankara of Jainism. He is described to be a Kshatriya born in the Solar dynasty. The earliest epigraphical record of Bhāratavarṣa in a geographical sense is in the Hathigumpha inscription of Jain king Kharavela (first century BCE), where it applies only to a restrained area of northern India, namely the part of the Ganges west of Magadha. The inscription also mentions that Bharat was named after Emperor Bharata, the son of Rishabhdeva.

Vishnu Purana (2,3,1), Vayu Purana (33,52), Linga Purana (1,47,23), Brahmanda Purana (14,5,62), Agni Purana (107,11–12), Skanda Purana (37,57) and Markandeya Purana (50,41), all use the designation Bhāratavarṣa.

The Vishnu Purana mentions:

Uttaraṃ yat samudrasya himādreścaiva dakṣiṇam.
varṣaṃ tad bhārataṃ nāma bhāratī yatra santatiḥ.

— Vishnu Purana (2,3,1)
Translation:

The country that lies north of the ocean and south of the snowy mountains is called Bhāratam there dwell the descendants of Bharata.

The Bhagavata Purana mentions (Canto 5, Chapter 4) – "He (Rishabhdeva) begot a hundred sons that were exactly like him ... He (Bharata) had the best qualities and it was because of him that this land by the people is called Bhāratavarṣa."

Bharata Khanda (or Bhārata Kṣētra) is a term used in some of the Jain and Hindu texts.

The use of Bharat often has political overtones, appealing to Hindu nationalists. In 2023, Prime Minister Narendra Modi's Hindu nationalist government used the name Bharat in connection with a G20 gathering, which caused speculation on a name-change for the country. Such a change would need a constitutional amendment, meaning two-thirds of the vote in each of the two houses of parliament, and an official notice to the UN, advising how to write the name in the UN's six official languages.

== Hind/Hindustan ==
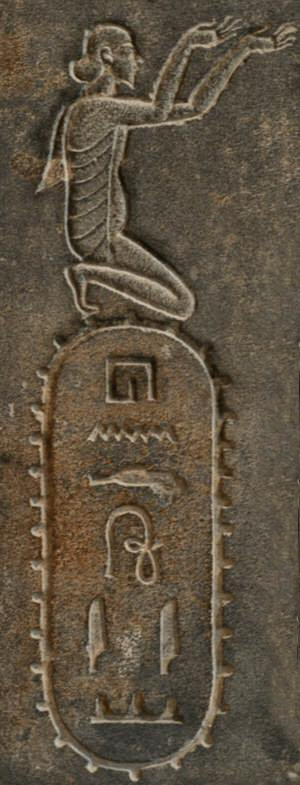
O4 N35 D46 V4 M17 M17 H-n-d-wꜢ-y "India" written in Egyptian hieroglyphs on the Statue of Darius I, circa 500 BCE.

The words Hindū (Persian: هندو) and Hind (Persian: هند) came from Indo-Aryan/Sanskrit Sindhu (the Indus River or its region). The Achaemenid emperor Darius I conquered the Indus Valley in about 516 BCE, upon which the Achaemenid equivalent of Sindhu, viz., "Hindush" (𐏃𐎡𐎯𐎢𐏁, H-i-du-u-š) was used for the lower Indus basin. The name was also known as far as the Achaemenid province of Egypt where it was written O4 N35 D46 V4 M17 M17 (H-n-d-wꜣ-y) on the Statue of Darius I, circa 500 BCE.
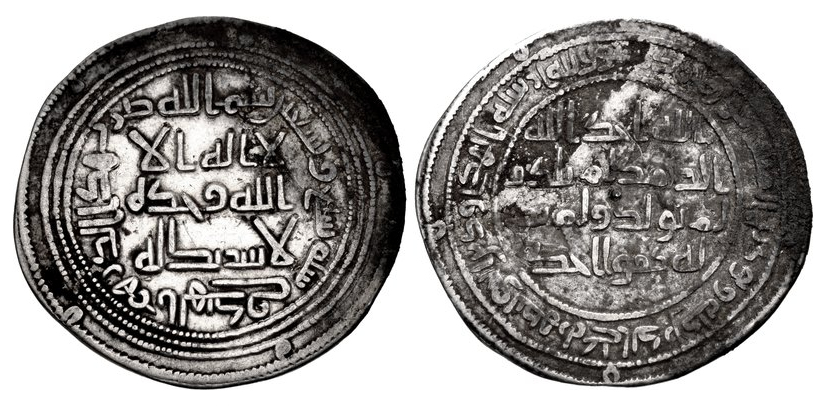
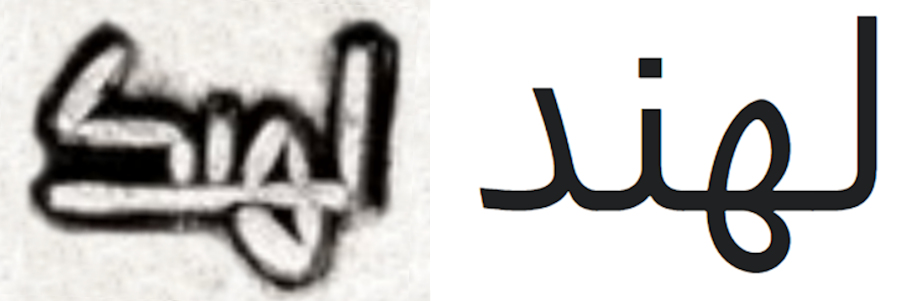
The name "al-Hind" (here بالهند Bil'Hind, "In India") on an Umayyad coin minted in India, from the time of the first Governor of Sindh Muhammad ibn Qasim in 715 CE. (Note: بالهند Bil'Hind appears upside-down at 6h (bottom) on the circular legend of the obverse side of the coin. The complete circular legend is "In the name of Allah, struck this dirham in al-Hind in the year seven and ninety.")

In Middle Persian, probably from the first century CE, the suffix -stān (Persian: ستان) was added, indicative of a country or region, forming the name Hindūstān. Thus, Sindh was referred to as Hindustān in the Naqsh-e-Rustam inscription of Sassanid emperor Shapur I in c. 262 CE.

Emperor Babur of the Mughal Empire said, "On the East, the South, and the West it is bounded by the Great Ocean." Hind was notably adapted in the Arabic language as the definitive form Al-Hind (الهند) for India, for example, in the 11th-century Tarikh Al-Hind ('History of India'). It occurs intermittently in usage within India, such as in the phrase Jai Hind (Hindi: जय हिन्द) or in Hind Mahāsāgar (हिन्द महासागर), the standard Hindi name for the Indian Ocean.

Both the names were current in Persian and Arabic, and from that into northern Indian languages, from the 11th century Islamic conquests: the rulers in the Delhi Sultanate and Mughal periods called their Indian dominion, centered around Delhi, "Hindustan". In contemporary Persian and Hindi-Urdu, the term Hindustan has recently come to mean the Republic of India. The same is the case with Arabic, where al-Hind is the name for the Republic of India.

"Hindustan", as the term Hindu itself, entered the English language in the 17th century. In the 19th century, the term as used in English referred to the subcontinent. "Hindustan" was in use simultaneously with "India" during the British era.

== Jambudvīpa ==
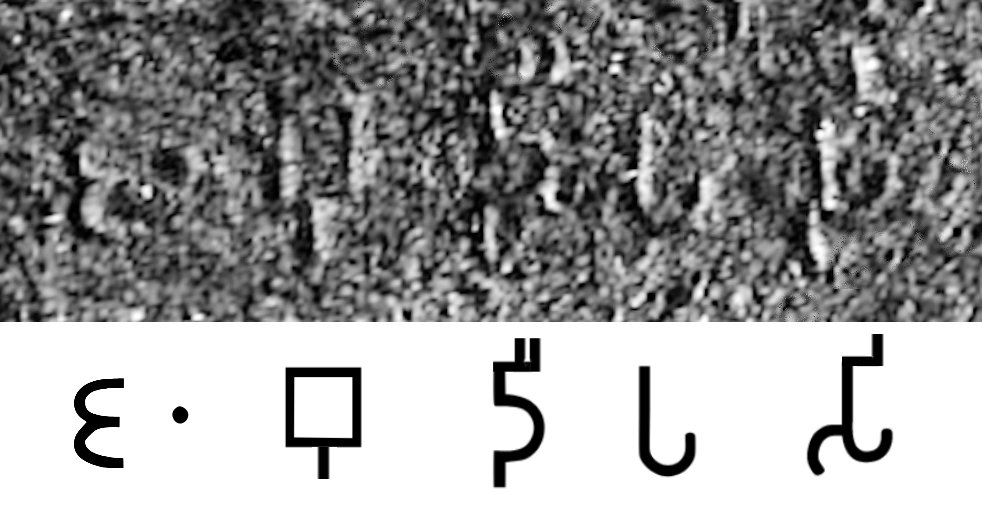
The name Jambudīpasi for "India" (Brahmi script) in the Sahasram Minor Rock Edict of Ashoka, circa 250 BCE.

Jambudvīpa (Sanskrit: जम्बुद्वीपम्, romanized: Jambu-dvīpam, lit. 'berry island') was used in ancient scriptures as a name of India before the term Bhārat became widespread. It might be an indirect reference to the Insular India. In Myanmar it was called "Zabudipa". The derivative Jambu Dwipa was the historical term for India in many Southeast Asian countries before the introduction of the English word "India". This alternate name is still used occasionally in Thailand, Malaysia, Java and Bali to describe the Indian subcontinent. However, it also can refer to the whole continent of Asia. It was used by Maurya Emperor Ashoka in his inscriptions to denote his realm.

== Gyagar and Phagyul ==
Both Gyagar ("White expanse") and Phagyul are Tibetan names for India. Ancient Tibetan Buddhist authors and pilgrims used the ethnogeographic referents Gyagar or Gyagar to the south and Madhyadesa (central land or holy centre) for India. Since at least the 13th century, several influential indigenous Tibetan lamas and authors referred to India as Phagyul, short for Phags yul, meaning the land of Aryas, referring to noble or spiritually enlightened people regarded in Tibetan Buddhism as the source of Buddhist learning. Tibetan scholar Gendun Chopel explains that the Tibetan word Gyagar derives from the Sanskrit vihāra (Buddhist monastery), and the ancient Tibetans applied the term Geysar mainly to the northern and central India region from Kuru (modern Haryana) to Magadha (modern Bihar). The Epic of King Gesar, which developed between 200 BCE-300 BCE and about 600 CE, describes India as "Gyagar: The Kingdom of Buddhist Doctrine", "Gyagar: The Kingdom of Aru Medicine" (Ayurveda), "Gyagar: The Kingdom of Pearls", and "Gyagar: The Kingdom of Golden Vases". The Central Tibetan Administration, often referred to as the Tibetan Government-in-Exile, asserts "Tibet is inextricably linked to India through geography, history, culture, and spiritually, Tibetans refer to India as 'Gyagar Phagpay Yul' or 'India the land of Aryas.'" The Dalai Lama has described India as Tibet's guru and Tibet as its chela (disciple), referred to himself as a 'Son of India' and a true follower of Mahatma Gandhi. He continues to advocate the revival of India's ancient wisdom based on the Nalanda tradition."

== Tianzhu ==
Tianzhu (天竺, OC:*‍qʰl'iːn tuɡ, mod. Tiānzhú) is one of several Chinese transliterations of the Sanskrit Sindhu via Persian Hindu and is used since ancient times in China and its peripheries. Its Sino-Xenic reading is Tenjiku in Japanese, Cheonchuk (천축) in Korean, and Thiên Trúc in Vietnamese. Devout Buddhists in the Sinosphere traditionally used this term and its related forms to designate India as their "heavenly centre", referring to the sacred origins of Buddhism in the Indian subcontinent.

Other forms include Juandu (身毒; Juāndú), which appears in Sima Qian's Shiji. Another is Tiandu (天篤; Tiāndǔ), which is used in the Hou Hanshu (Book of the Later Han). Yintejia or Indəkka (印特伽; Yìntèjiā) comes from the Kuchean Indaka, another transliteration of Hindu.

A detailed account of Tianzhu is given in the "Xiyu Zhuan" (Record of the Western Regions) in the Hou Hanshu compiled by Fan Ye (398–445):

The state of Tianzhu: Also named Shendu, it lies several thousand li southeast of Yuezhi. Its customs are the same as those of Yuezhi, and it is low, damp, and very hot. It borders a large river. The inhabitants ride on elephants in warfare; they are weaker than the Yuezhi. They practise the way of Futu (the Buddha), [and therefore] it has become a custom among them not to kill or attack [others]. From west of the states Yuezhi and Gaofu, and south until the Western Sea, and east until the state of Panqi, all is the territory of Shendu. Shendu has several hundred separate towns, with a governor, and separate states which can be numbered in the tens, each with its own king. Although there are small differences among them, they all come under the general name of Shendu, and at this time all are subject to Yuezhi. Yuezhi have killed their kings and established a general in order to rule over their people. The land produces elephants, rhinoceros, tortoise shell, gold, silver, copper, iron, lead, and tin. It communicates to the west with Da Qin and (so) has the exotica of Da Qin.

Tianzhu was also referred to as Wu Tianzhu (五天竺; Wǔ Tiānzhú; 'Five Indias'), because there were five geographical regions in India known to the Chinese: Central, Eastern, Western, Northern, and Southern India. The monk Xuanzang also referred to India as Wu Yin (五印; Wǔ Yìn; 'Five Inds').

The name Tianzhu and its Sino-Xenic cognates were eventually replaced by terms derived from the Middle Chinese borrowing of *yentu from Kuchean, though a very long time elapsed between that term's first use and its becoming the standard modern name for India in East Asian languages. Pronounced Yindu (Chinese: 印度; pinyin: Yìndù) in Chinese, it was first used by the seventh-century monk and traveler Xuanzang. In Japanese for example, the name Indo (インド, 印度, or occasionally 印土) had been found occasionally in 18th and early 19th-century works, such as Arai Hakuseki's Sairan Igen (1713) and Yamamura Saisuke's Indoshi (印度志, a translation of a work by Johann Hübner). However, the use of the name Tenjiku, which was heavily associated with the image of India as a land of Buddhism, was not completely displaced until the early 20th century: scholars such as Soyen Shaku and Seki Seisetsu who travelled to India for pilgrimages to Buddhist historical sites, continued to use the name Tenjiku to emphasise the religious aspect of their travels, though most of their contemporaries (even fellow Buddhist pilgrims) adopted the name Indo by then.

== Hodu ==
Hodu (Hebrew: הֹדּוּ Hodû) is the Biblical Hebrew name for India mentioned in the Book of Esther part of the Jewish Tanakh and Christian Old Testament. Ahasuerus was described as King ruling 127 provinces from Hodu (India) to Kush. The term seemingly derives from Sanskrit Sindhu, "great river", i.e., the Indus River, via Old Persian Hiñd°u.

== Historical names ==
Some historical definitions prior to 1500 are presented below.

Year	Name	Source/Origin	Definition of name
c. 440 BCE	India	Herodotus	"Eastward of India lies a tract which is entirely sand. Indeed, of all the inhabitants of Asia, concerning whom anything is known, the Indians dwell nearest to the east and the rising of the Sun."
c. 400–300 BCE	Hodû	Book of Esther (Bible)	"Now it took place in the days of Ahasuerus, the Ahasuerus who reigned from Hodu (India) to Cush (Ethiopia) over 127 provinces"
c. 300 BCE	India/Indikē	Megasthenes	"India then being four-sided in plan, the side which looks to the Orient and that to the South, the Great Sea compasseth; that towards the Arctic is divided by the mountain chain of Hēmōdus from Scythia, inhabited by that tribe of Scythians who are called Sakai; and on the fourth side, turned towards the West, the Indus marks the boundary, the biggest or nearly so of all rivers after the Nile."
250 BCE	Jambudvīpa	Ashoka; Minor Rock Edicts of Ashoka	"Devānāṃpiya [speaks] thus. ...... years since I am a lay-worshipper (upāsaka). But (I had) not been very zealous. A year and somewhat more (has passed) since ...... And men in Jambudīpa, being during that time unmingled with the gods, have (now) been made (by me) mingled with the gods. [For] this is the fruit [of zeal]. cannot 1 be reached by (persons of) high rank alone, (but) even a lowly (person) is able to attain even the great heaven if he is zealous. Now, for the following purpose (has) this proclamation (been issued), (that) both the lowly and the exalted may be zealous, and (that) even (my) borderers may know (it), and (that this) zeal may be of long duration. And this matter will (be made by me to) progress, and will (be made to) progress even considerably ; it will (be made to) progress to one and a half, to at least one and a half. And this proclamation (was issued by me) on tour. Two hundred and fifty-six nights (had then been) spent on tour, — 256. And cause ye this matter to be engraved on rocks. And where there are stone pillars here (in my dominions), there also cause (it) to be engraved."
Between first century BCE and ninth century CE	Bhāratavarṣa (realm of Bhārata); Bhāratam	Vishnu Purana	"उत्तरं यत्समुद्रस्य हिमाद्रेश्चैव दक्षिणम् । वर्षं तद् भारतं नाम भारती यत्र संततिः ।।" i.e. "The country (varṣam) that lies north of the ocean and south of the snowy mountains is called Bhāratam; there dwell the descendants of Bharata."
c. 140	Indoi, Indou	Arrian	"The boundary of the land of India towards the north is Mount Taurus. It is not still called Taurus in this land; but Taurus begins from the sea over against Pamphylia and Lycia and Cilicia; and reaches as far as the Eastern Ocean, running right across Asia. But the mountain has different names in different places; in one, Parapamisus, in another Hemodus; elsewhere it is called Imaon and perhaps has all sorts of other names; but the Macedonians who fought with Alexander called it Caucasus; another Caucasus, that is, not the Scythian; so that the story ran that Alexander came even to the far side of the Caucasus. The western part of India is bounded by the river Indus right down to the ocean, where the river runs out by two mouths, not joined as are the five mouths of the Ister; but like those of the Nile, by which the Egyptian delta is formed; thus also the Indian delta is formed by the river Indus, not less than the Egyptian; and this in the Indian tongue is called Pattala. Towards the south this ocean bounds the land of India, and eastward the sea itself is the boundary. The southern part near Pattala and the mouths of the Indus were surveyed by Alexander and Macedonians and many Greeks; as for the eastern part, Alexander did not traverse this beyond the river Hyphasis. A few historians have described the parts which are this side of the Ganges and where are the mouths of the Ganges and the city of Palimbothra, the greatest Indian city on the Ganges.(...) The Indian rivers are greater than any others in Asia; greatest are the Ganges and the Indus, whence the land gets its name; each of these is greater than the Nile of Egypt and the Scythian Ister, even were these put together; my own idea is that even the Acesines is greater than the Ister and the Nile, where the Acesines having taken in the Hydaspes, Hydraotes, and Hyphasis, runs into the Indus, so that its breadth there becomes thirty stades. Possibly also other greater rivers run through the land of India."
c. 650	Five Indies	Xuanzang	"The circumference of 五印 (Modern Chinese: Wǔ Yìn, the Five Indies) is about 90,000 li; on three sides it is bounded by a great sea; on the north it is backed by snowy mountains. It is wide at the north and narrow at the south; its figure is that of a half-moon."
c. 950	Hind	Istakhri	"As for the land of the Hind it is bounded on the East by the Persian Sea (i.e. the Indian Ocean), on the W. and S. by the countries of Islām and on the N. by the Chinese Empire... The length of the land of the Hind from the government of Mokrān, the country of Mansūra and Bodha and the rest of Sind, till thou comest to Kannauj and thence passest on to Tibet, is about 4 months and its breadth from the Indian Ocean to the country of Kannūj about three months."
c. 1020	Hind	Al-Biruni	"Hind is surrounded on the East by Chín and Máchín, on the West by Sind (Baluchistan) and Kábul and on the South by the Sea."
	Hindustan	John Richardson, A Smaller Manual of Modern Geography. Physical and Political	"The boundaries of Hindustan are marked on every side by natural features; e.g., the Himalayas, on the N.; the Patkoi Mountains, Tippera Hills, &c., on the N.E.; the Sea, on the E., S., and W.; and the Hala, and Sulaiman Mountains, on the N.W."

== Historical definitions of a Greater India ==
Writers, both Indian and of other nationalities have written about a 'Greater India', which Indians have called either Akhand Bharat or Mahabharat.

Year	Name	Source	Definition
944	Al-Hind	Al-Masudi; Muruj adh-dhahab wa ma'adin al-jawhar	"The Hindu nation (Al-Hind) extends from the mountains of Khorasan and of es-Sind (Baluchistan) as far as et-Tubbet (Tibetan Plateau.)"
982–983	Hindistān	Author Unknown; Hudud al-'Alam	"East of it (Hindistān) are the countries of China and Tibet; South of it, the Great Sea; west of it, the river Mihran (Indus); north of it, the country of Shaknan belonging to Vakhan and some parts of Tibet."
1205	Hind	Hasan Nizami	"The whole country of Hind, from Peshawar in the north, to the Indian Ocean in the south; from Sehwan (on the west bank of the Indus) to the mountains on the east dividing from China."
1298	India the Greater; India the Minor; Middle India	Marco Polo	"India the Greater is that which extends from Maabar to Kesmacoran (i.e. from Coromandel to Mekran) and it contains 13 great kingdoms... India the Lesser extends from the Province of Champa to Mutfili (i.e. from Cochinchina to the Krishna Delta) and contains 8 great Kingdoms... Abash is a very great province and you must know that it constitutes the Middle India."
c. 1328	India	Jordan Catala of Sévérac	"What shall I say? The greatness of this India is beyond description. But let this much suffice concerning India the Greater and the Less. Of India Tertia I will say this, that I have not indeed seen its many marvels, not having been there..."
1404	India Minor	Ruy González de Clavijo	"And this same Thursday that the said Ambassadors arrived at this great River (the Oxus) they crossed to the other side. And the same day... came in the evening to a great city which is called Tenmit (Termez) and this used to belong to India Minor, but now belongs to the empire of Samarkand, having been conquered by Tamurbec."
1590	Hindustān	Abu'l-Fazl ibn Mubarak; Ain-i-Akbari	"Hindustan is described as enclosed on the east, west and south by the ocean, but Sarandip (Sri Lanka), Achin (Indonesia), Maluk (Indonesia) and Malagha (Malaysia) and a considerable number of islands are accounted for within its extent."
16th century	Indostān	Ignazio Danti	"The part of India beyond the Ganges extends in length as far as Cathay (China) and contains many provinces in which are found many notable things. As in the Kingdom of Kamul near Campichu (Cambodia)...And in Erguiul...In the Ava Mountains (Burma)..., and in the Salgatgu mountains...In Caindu...In the territory of Carajan..."

== Republic of India ==
The name and logo of state-owned petroleum companies of India

The official names as set down in Article 1 of the Indian constitution are:

- Hindi: भारत (Bhārat)
- English: India

== See also ==
- Origin of the names of Indian states
- Indosphere
- Bharat Khand
- Sapta Sindhu
- Bharat chakravartin
- Akhand Bharat
- Renaming of cities in India

== Bibliography ==
- Eggermont, Pierre Herman Leonard (1975), Alexander's Campaigns in Sind and Baluchistan and the Siege of the Brahmin Town of Harmatelia, Peeters Publishers, ISBN 978-90-6186-037-2
- Ray, Niharranjan; Chattopadhyaya, Brajadulal, eds. (2000), A Sourcebook of Indian Civilization, Orient Blackswan, ISBN 978-81-250-1871-1
- Rocher, Ludo (1986). The Purāṇas. Wiesbaden: Otto Harrassowitz Verlag. ISBN 3-447-02522-0.
