= Poros (disambiguation) =

Poros is a Greek island-pair in the southern part of the Saronic Gulf.

Poros may also refer to:

- Poros stone is named after the islands
- Poros (Attica), a deme of ancient Attica

Any of several villages in Greece:

- Poros, Aetolia-Acarnania, a village of the Nafpaktia municipality
- Poros, Kefalonia, a village of the Cephalonia municipality
- Poros, Elis, a village of the Andritsaina-Krestena municipality
- Poros, Evros, a village of the Alexandroupoli municipality
- Poros, Grevena, a village of the Grevena municipality
- Poros, Imathia, a village of the Veria municipality
- Poros, Lefkada, a village of the Lefkada municipality

== See also ==
- Porus (disambiguation)
- City of Poros (ship), a Greek ferry involved in a terrorist attack in 1988
