= List of ancient Indo-Aryan peoples and tribes =

This is a list of ancient Indo-Aryan peoples and tribes that are mentioned in the literature of Indian religions.

From the second or first millennium BCE, ancient Indo-Aryan peoples and tribes turned into most of the population in the northern part of the Indian subcontinent – Indus Valley (roughly today's Pakistani Punjab and Sindh), Western India, Northern India, Central India, Eastern India and also in areas of the southern part like Sri Lanka and the Maldives through and after a complex process of migration, assimilation of other peoples and language shift.

== Ancestors ==
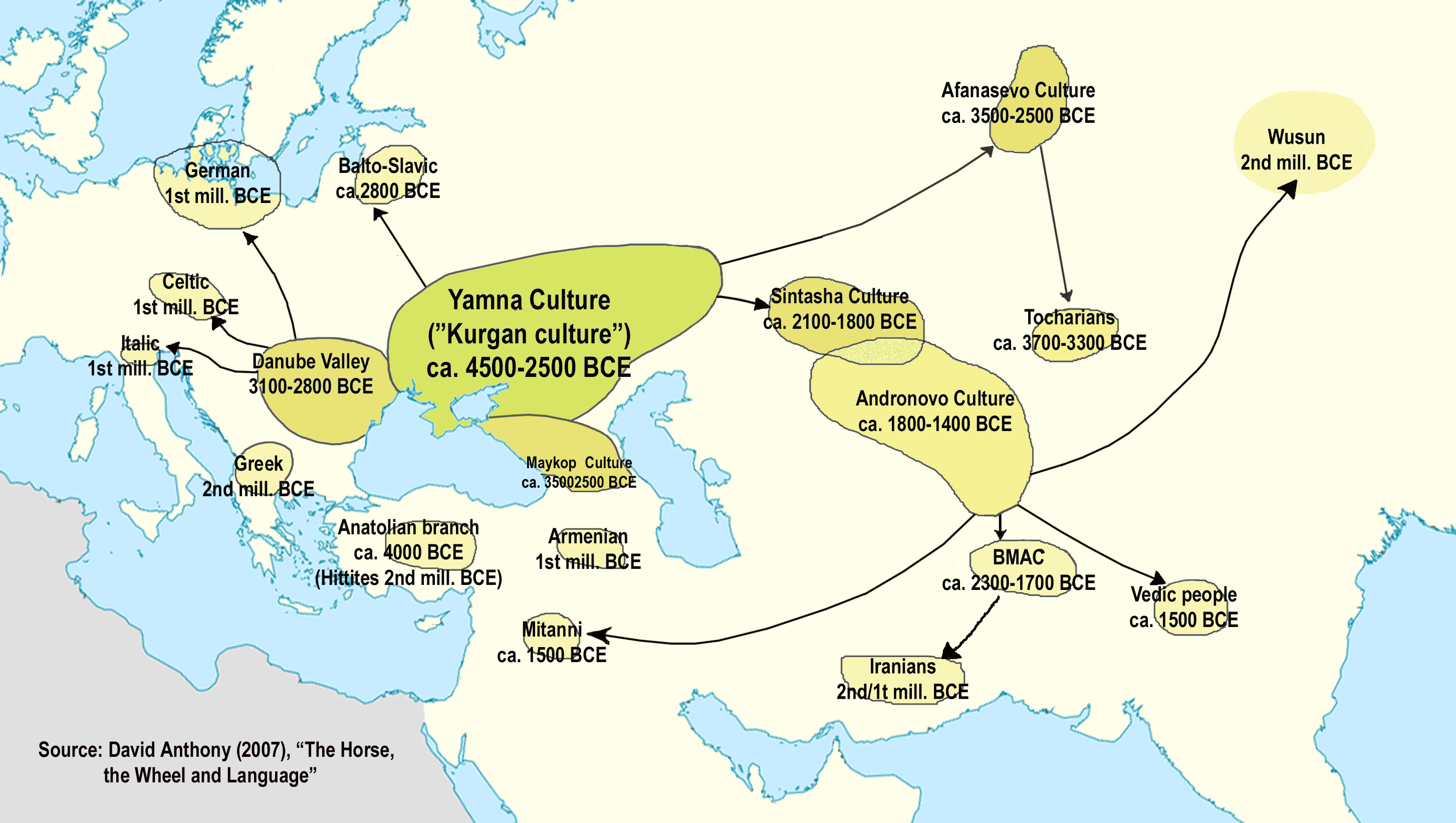
Map 1: Indo-European migrations as described in The Horse, the Wheel, and Language by David W. Anthony

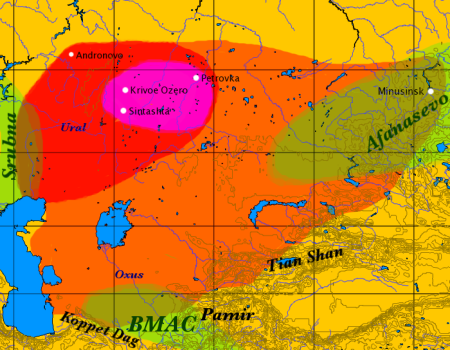
Map 2: Sintashta-Petrovka culture (red), its expansion into the Andronovo culture (orange) during the 2nd millennium BC, showing the overlap with the Bactria–Margiana Archaeological Complex (chartreuse green) in the south and also with the Afanasievo culture in the east. The location of the earliest chariots is shown in magenta. Several scholars associate Proto-Indo-Iranians with Sintashta-Petrovka culture. These scholars also may associate some mentions in the Avesta (sacred scriptures of Zoroastrianism), like the Airyanəm Vaēǰō – "Aryans' Expanse", as distant memories that were retained by oral tradition of this old land of origin. There are also mentions of Āryāvarta – "Aryans Abode" (in sacred Hindu scriptures such as Dharmashastras and Sutras), the Hindu counterpart of Airyanəm Vaēǰō, although it refers to Northern India and they are later.

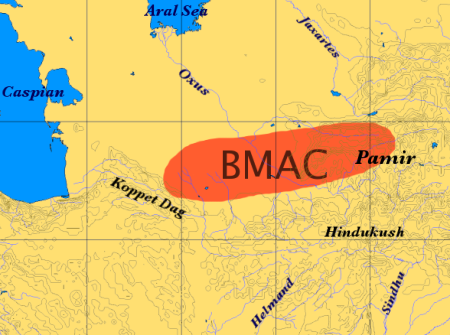
Map 3: The extent of the Bactria-Margiana Archaeological Complex (BMAC), according to the Encyclopedia of Indo-European Culture. The BMAC culture and peoples influenced migrating Indo-Iranians that came from the north.

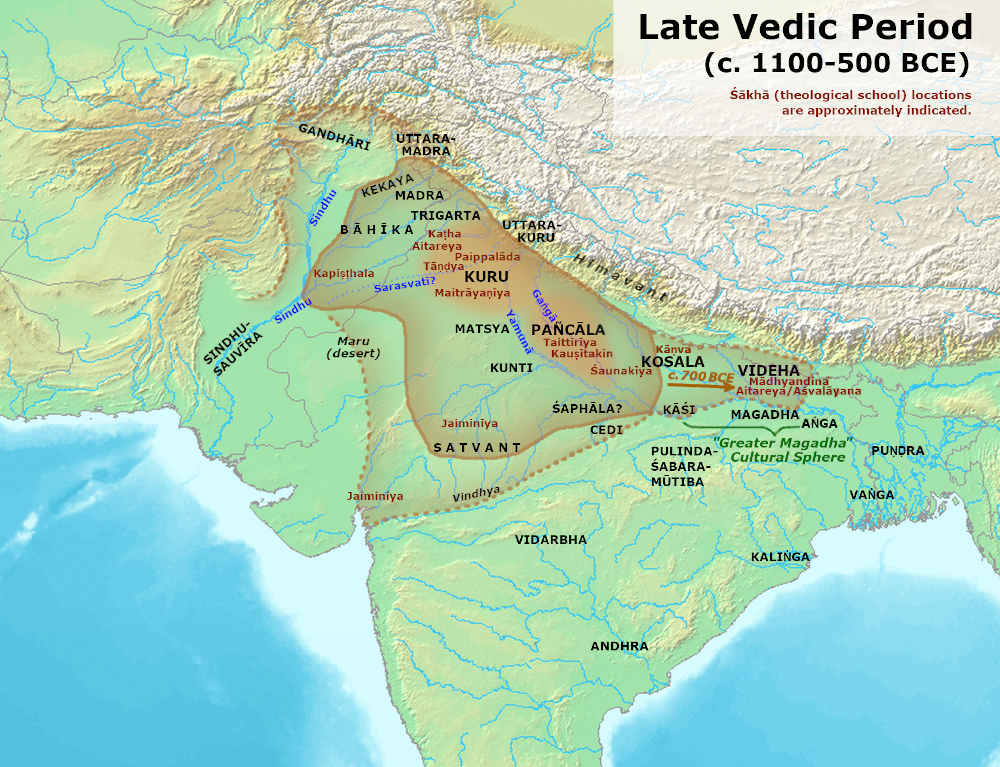
Vedic India.

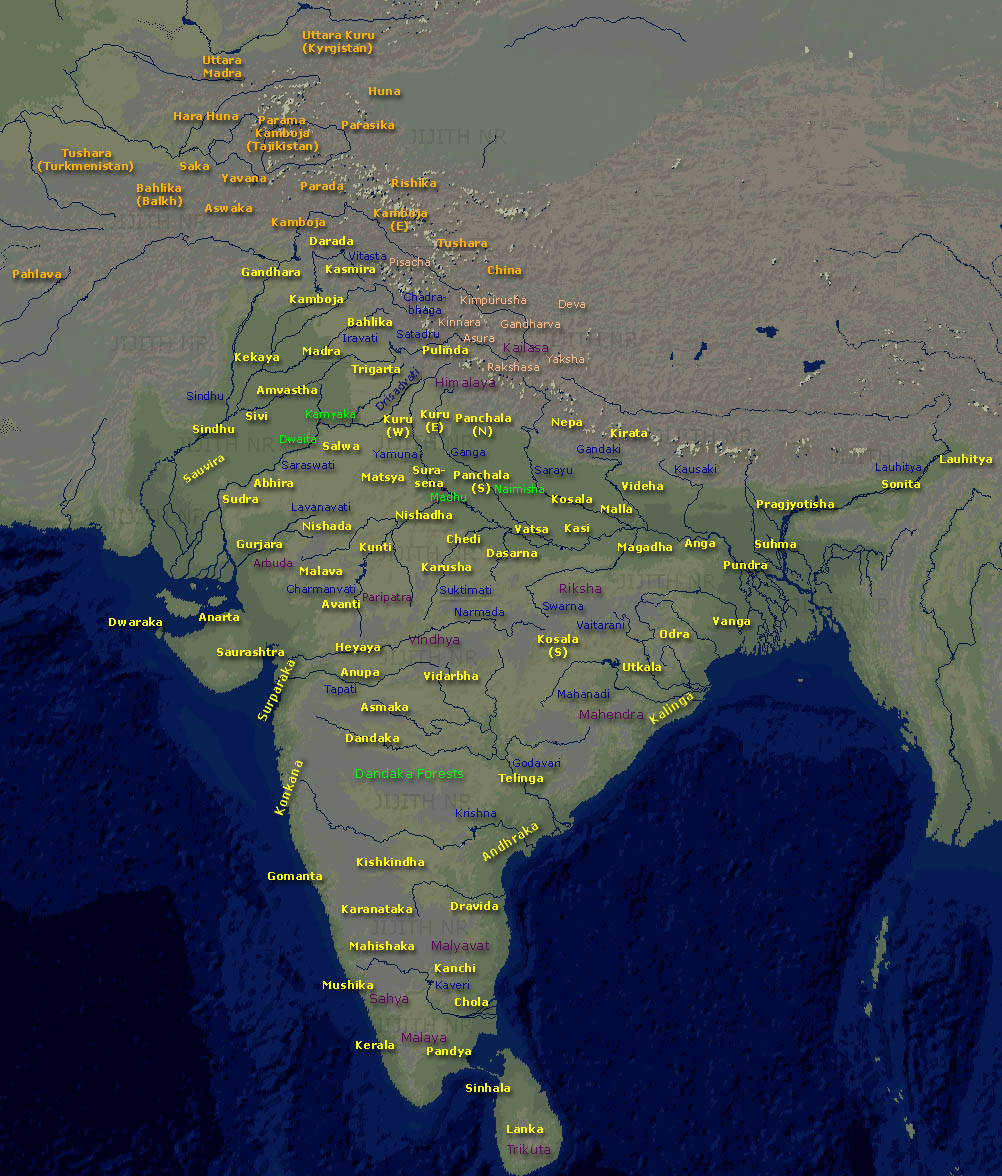
Map 5: This detailed map shows the locations of kingdoms and republics mentioned in the Indian epics or Bharata Khanda.

- Proto-Indo-Iranians (common ancestors of the Iranian, Nuristani and Indo-Aryan peoples) (Proto-Indo-Iranian speakers)
  - Proto-Indo-Aryans (Proto-Indo-Aryan speakers)

== Vedic tribes ==
- Alina people (RV 7.18.7)
- Anu (RV 1.108.8, RV 8.10.5)
- Bharatas- The Bharatas are a major Aryan clan, especially in Mandala 3 attributed to the Bharata sage Vishvamitra. The entire Bharata clan is described as crossing over, with their chariots and wagons, at the confluence of the Vipash (Beas River) and Shutudri (Satlej). The Bharatas are mentioned as the protagonists in the Battle of the Ten Kings in Mandala 7 (7.18 etc.), where they are on the winning side. They appear to have been successful in the early power-struggles between the various Aryan and non-Aryan clans so that they continue to dominate in post-Rigvedic texts, and later in the (Epic) tradition. "Bhārata" today is the official name of the Republic of India (see also Etymology of India).
- Chedi
- Dasa
- Druhyus (Rigveda, RV 1.108.8, RV 8.10.5)
- Gandhara
- Ikshvaku dynasty
- Kuru
- Matsya
- Pakhta
- Puru (Pūru)
- Ruśama (RV Mandala 8)
- Sārasvata
- Tritsu (RV 7.18, 7.33, 7.83)
- Yadu: Of Indo-Aryan origin,Yadu is one of the five early Rigvedic tribes (panchajana, panchakrishtya or panchamanusha) mentioned in the Rigveda. The Yadus had a tribal union with the Turvasha tribe, and were frequently described together. The Yadus were an Aryan tribe. By the time of the arrival of the Puru and Bharata tribes, the Yadu-Turvashas were settled in Punjab, with the Yadus possibly residing along the Yamuna River.
  In Mandalas 4 and 5 of the Rigveda, the god Indra is stated to have saved the Yadu-Turvashas from drowning when they crossed rivers. In Mandala 6, the Yadu-Turvashas are stated to have been "brought from far away" by Indra. The Yadu-Turvashas are treated relatively positively in Mandalas 5, 6, and 8, and are stated to be the occasional allies and enemies of the Puru-Bharatas. In the Battle of the Ten Kings, the Yadus were defeated by Bharata chieftain Sudas.

== Pancha Jana (Five tribes) ==
(पञ्च जना – Páñca Jánāḥ / Pancha-janah) The pancha Jana are five tribes inexplicitly listed together during the (Āryāvarta of this time, c. 1700–1500 BCE, roughly corresponds with the Punjab and closer regions) (see the map of Early Vedic Period)

- Anu (in the southwest part of early Āryāvarta)
- Druhyu (in the north part of early Āryāvarta)
- Puru (ancestors of the Paurava) (in the centre and east parts of early Āryāvarta, including Sarasvati river region)
- Turvaśa (Turvasha) (in the centre and south parts of early Āryāvarta): The Turvashas (Sanskrit: तुर्वश, Turvaśa) were one of the five major peoples (panchajana, panchakrishtya or panchamanusha) mentioned in the Rigveda. The Turvashas had a tribal union with the Yadu tribe, and were frequently described together. The Turvashas were a partly Indo-Aryan-acculturated Indus tribe. By the time of the arrival of the Puru and Bharata tribes, the Yadu-Turvashas were settled in Punjab. By the time of the Shatapatha Brahmana (7th-6th centuries BCE), the Turvashas are linked to the Panchalas.
  Alfred Ludvig first conjectured that Turvīti and Vayya could have been connected with the Turvasha tribe, a notion that is still considered only speculation according to Witzel. In Mandalas 4 and 5 of the Rigveda, the god Indra is stated to have saved the Yadu-Turvashas from drowning when they crossed rivers. In Mandala 6, the Yadu-Turvashas are stated to have been "brought from far away" by Indra. The Yadu-Turvashas are treated relatively positively in Mandalas 5, 6, and 8, and are stated to be the occasional allies and enemies of the Puru-Bharatas.
- Yadu (in the southeast and south parts of early Āryāvarta)

== Early Janapadas (c. 1700–1100 BCE) ==
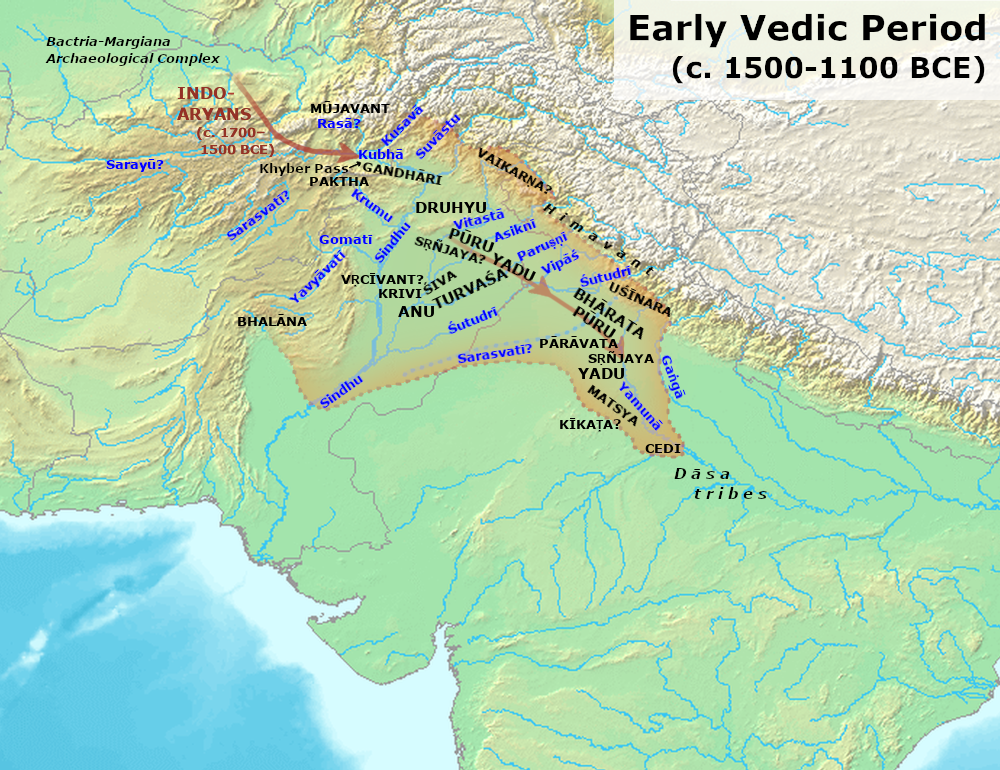
Map 6: Early Vedic Culture (1700–1100 BCE) and location of early Indo-Aryan peoples and tribes

After roughly 1700 BCE Indo-Aryan peoples and tribes were swiftly expanding through ancient northern India, therefore the number of peoples, tribes and clans was increasing (as well as the number of Indo-Aryan language speakers) and Āryāvarta was becoming a very large area (see the map on the right side).

- Aja – (Madhya-desha Āryāvarta – Central Āryāvarta)
- Ambaśṭha – (Madhya-desha Āryāvarta – Central Āryāvarta)
- Aṅga – Prachya Āryāvarta – Eastern Āryāvarta (Madhya-desha and Prachya Āryāvarta – Central and Eastern Āryāvarta in Vamana).
- Anu – is a Vedic Sanskrit term for one of the 5 major tribes in the Rigveda, RV 1.108.8, RV 8.10.5 (both times listed together with the Druhyu) and, much later also in the Mahabharata. In the late Vedic period, one of the Anu kings, King Anga, is mentioned as a "chakravartin" (AB 8.22). Ānava, the vrddhi derivation of Anu, is the name of a ruler in the Rigvedic account of the Battle of the Ten Kings (7.18.13) and at 8.4.1 with the Turvaśa (tribe). The meaning ánu "living, human" (Naighantu) cannot be substantiated for the Rigveda and may have been derived from the tribal name. (Pratichya Āryāvarta – Western Āryāvarta)
- Āyu
- Bhajeratha
- Bhalana – The Bhalanas were one of the tribes that fought against Sudas in the Dasarajna battle. Some scholars have argued that the Bhalanas lived in South Central and Western Pakistan, and that the Bolan Pass, around which live the Brahui people, are the Bhalana people and abode. (Pratichya Āryāvarta – Western Āryāvarta)
- Bharadvāja – (Madhya-desha Āryāvarta – Central Āryāvarta)
- Bhrigus
- Bheda – (Madhya-desha Āryāvarta – Central Āryāvarta)
- Bodha – (Madhya-desha Āryāvarta – Central Āryāvarta)
- Druhyu – The Druhyu were a people of Vedic India. They are mentioned in the Rigveda, (Note: For example: RV 1.108.8; 7.18; 8.10.5; 6.46.8) usually together with the Anu tribe. Some early scholars have placed them in the northwestern region. The later texts, the Epic and the Puranas, locate them in the "north", that is, in Gandhara, Aratta and Setu. (Vishnu Purana IV.17) The Druhyus were driven out of the land of the seven rivers, and their next king, Gandhara, settled in a north-western region which became known as Gandhāra. The sons of the later Druhyu king Pracetas too settle in the "northern" (udīcya) region (Bhagavata 9.23.15–16; Visnu 4.17.5; Vayu 99.11–12; Brahmanda 3.74.11–12 and Matsya 48.9.). The word Druid (Gallic Celtic druides), is partially derived from Proto-Indo-European vid "to see, to know' It has also been alleged that the Rg Veda and the Puranas describe this tribe as migrating North. However, there is nothing of this in the Rigveda and the Puranas merely mention that the Druhyu are "adjacent (āśrita) to the North". (Pratichya Āryāvarta – Western Āryāvarta)
- Gandharis (Pratichya Āryāvarta – Western Āryāvarta)
1. Guṅgu
2. Iksvaku (Pratichya Āryāvarta – Western Āryāvarta)
- Kārūṣa (Karusha) – later Cedi (Chedi) (Madhya-desha Āryāvarta – Central Āryāvarta)
- Keśin (Madhya-desha Āryāvarta – Central Āryāvarta)
- Kīkaṭa (Prachya Āryāvarta – Eastern Āryāvarta)
- Kosala (Prachya Āryāvarta – Eastern Āryāvarta)
- Krivi (Madhya-desha Āryāvarta – Central Āryāvarta)
- Kunti (Madhya-desha Āryāvarta – Central Āryāvarta)
- Madra (Udichya Āryāvarta – Northern Āryāvarta)
  - Uttara Madra (Udichya Āryāvarta – Northern Āryāvarta)
- Magadha (Prachya Āryāvarta – Eastern Āryāvarta)
- Mahāvṛṣa (Mahavrisha) (Udichya Āryāvarta – Northern Āryāvarta)
- Mahīna
- Malankhara
- Matsya (Madhya-desha Āryāvarta – Central Āryāvarta)
- Mūjavana / Maujavant (Udichya Āryāvarta – Northern Āryāvarta)
- Nahuṣa
- Pāñcala (Panchala) (Madhya-desha Āryāvarta – Central Āryāvarta)
- Pārāvata (Madhya-desha Āryāvarta – Central Āryāvarta)
- Pṛthu (Prithu) (Pratichya Āryāvarta – Western Āryāvarta)
- Pūru (Puru) (Madhya-desha Āryāvarta – Central Āryāvarta)
  - Bharatas – The Bharatas are an Aryan tribe mentioned in the Rigveda, especially in Mandala 3 attributed to the Bharata sage Vishvamitra and in and Mandala 7. Bharatá is also used as a name of Agni (literally, "to be maintained", viz. the fire having to be kept alive by the care of men), and as a name of Rudra in RV 2.36.8. In one of the "river hymns" RV 3.33, the entire Bharata tribe is described as crossing over, with their chariots and wagons, at the confluence of the Vipash (Beas) and Shutudri (Satlej). Hymns by Vasistha in Mandala 7 (7.18 etc.) mention the Bharatas as the protagonists in the Battle of the Ten Kings, where they are on the winning side. They appear to have been successful in the early power-struggles between the various Aryan and non-Aryan tribes so that they continue to dominate in post-Rigvedic texts, and later in the (Epic) tradition, the Mahābhārata, the eponymous ancestor becomes Emperor Bharata, conqueror of 'all of India', and his tribe and kingdom is called Bhārata. "Bhārata" today is the official name of the Republic of India (see also Etymology of India). (Madhya-desha Āryāvarta – Central Āryāvarta)
    - Kuru – Ancestors of the Kaurava (Madhya-desha Āryāvarta – Central Āryāvarta)
      - Uttara Kuru (Udichya Āryāvarta – Northern Āryāvarta)
    - Pandu – Ancestors of the Pandava (Udichya Āryāvarta – Northern Āryāvarta)
  - Tṛtsu (Tritsu) The Tritsus are a sub-group of the Puru who are distinct from the Bharatas mentioned in Mandala 7 of the Rigveda (in hymns 18, 33 and 83). Under king Sudas they defeated the confederation of ten kings led by the Bharatas at the Battle of the Ten Kings. (Madhya-desha Āryāvarta – Central Āryāvarta)
- Ruśama (Madhya-desha Āryāvarta – Central Āryāvarta)
- Śālva (Shalva) (Madhya-desha Āryāvarta – Central Āryāvarta)
- Sārasvata – people that dwelt the banks of the Sarasvati river (Pratichya Āryāvarta – Western Āryāvarta)
- Satvanta (Dakshina Āryāvarta – Southern Āryāvarta)
- Śigru (Madhya-desha Āryāvarta – Central Āryāvarta)
- Śiva (Shiva, not to be confused with the God Śiva or Shiva) (Pratichya Āryāvarta – Western Āryāvarta)
- Srñjaya (Srinjaya) (Madhya-desha Āryāvarta – Central Āryāvarta)
- Śvikna (Madhya-desha Āryāvarta – Central Āryāvarta)
- Turvaśa (Turvasa)
- Uśīnara (Ushinara) (Madhya-desha Āryāvarta – Central Āryāvarta)
- Vaikarṇa (Vaikarna) (Udichya Āryāvarta – Northern Āryāvarta)
- Vaṅga (Vanga) (Prachya Āryāvarta – Eastern Āryāvarta)
- Varaśikha (Varashikha) (Madhya-desha Āryāvarta – Central Āryāvarta)
- Vaśa (Vasha) (Madhya-desha Āryāvarta – Central Āryāvarta)
- Vidarbha (Vidarbha, Dakshina Āryāvarta – Southern Āryāvarta)
- Videha (Mithila, Prachya Āryāvarta – Eastern Āryāvarta)
- Viśaṇin (Vishanin) (Pratichya Āryāvarta – Western Āryāvarta)
- Vṛcivanta (Vrichivanta) (Pratichya Āryāvarta – Western Āryāvarta)
- Yadu (Dakshina Āryāvarta – Southern Āryāvarta)
- Yakṣu (Yakshu) (Madhya-desha Āryāvarta – Central Āryāvarta)

== Late Janapadas (c. 1100–500 BCE) ==
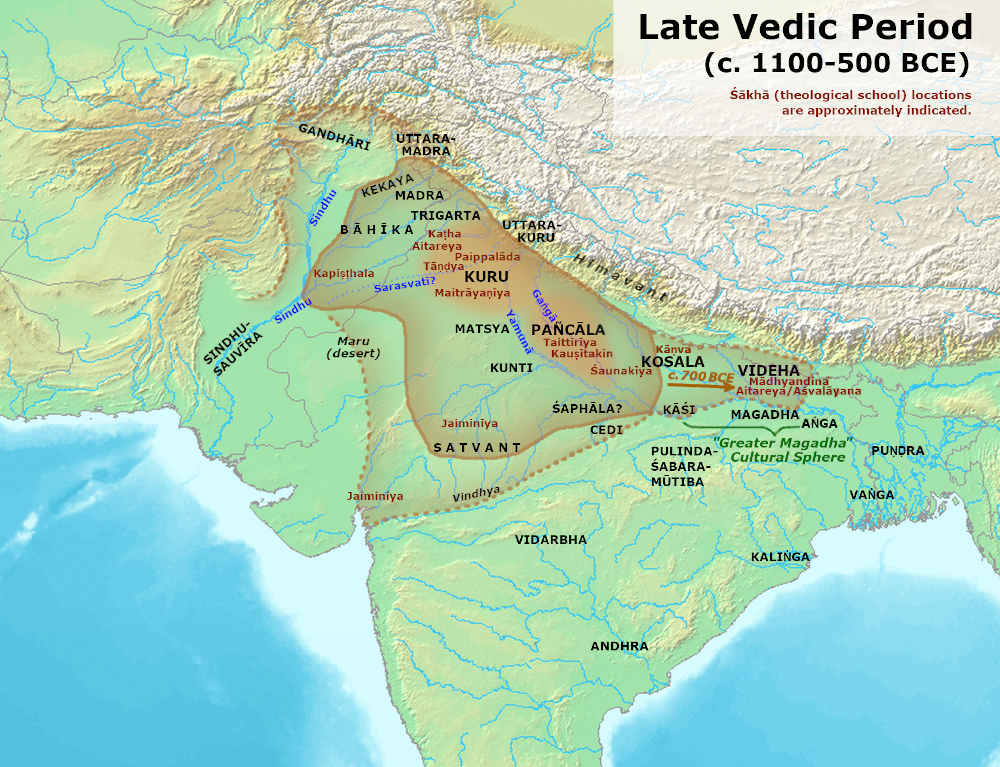
Map 7: Late Vedic era map showing the boundaries of Āryāvarta with Janapadas in northern India. Beginning of Iron Age kingdoms in India— Kuru, Panchala, Kosala, Videha.

From roughly 1100 to 500 BCE Indo-Aryan peoples and tribes expanded even further throughout ancient northern India (see the map 6).

- Abhīṣaha (Abhishaha) / Apanga (Vayu) / Aupadha (Markandeya) / Alasa (Vamana) – (Udichya Āryāvarta – Northern Āryāvarta)
- Āhuka / Kuhaka (Markandeya) / Kuhuka (Vamana) – (Udichya Āryāvarta – Northern Āryāvarta)
- Alimadra / Anibhadra (Markandeya) / Alibhadra (Vamana) – (Udichya Āryāvarta – Northern Āryāvarta)
- Aṅga – (Madhya-desha and Prachya Āryāvarta – Central and Eastern Āryāvarta in Vamana)
- Āntaranarmada / Uttaranarmada (Markandeya), Sunarmada (Vamana) – (Aparanta Āryāvarta – Western Āryāvarta)
- Antargiri – (Prachya Āryāvarta – Eastern Āryāvarta)
- Anūpa / Arūpa (Matsya), Annaja (Vayu) – (Vindhya-prashtha Āryāvarta – Vindhyan Āryāvarta)
- Aparānta / Purandhra (Matsya), Aparīta (Vayu) – (Udichya Āryāvarta – Northern Āryāvarta)
- Arthapa / Atharva (Markandeya) – (Madhya-desha Āryāvarta – Central Āryāvarta)
- Aśvakūṭa – (Madhya-desha Āryāvarta – Central Āryāvarta)
- Ātreya / Atri (Matsya, Brahmanda) – (Udichya Āryāvarta – Northern Āryāvarta)
- Audumbara / Audambara / Audumvara – (Udichya Āryāvarta – Northern Āryāvarta)
- Auṇḍra – (Vindhya-prashtha Āryāvarta – Vindhyan Āryāvarta)
- Bahirgiri – (Prachya Āryāvarta – Eastern Āryāvarta)
- Bhadra – (Prachya and Madhya-desha Āryāvarta – Eastern and Central Āryāvarta)
- Bhadrakāra – (Madhya-desha Āryāvarta – Central Āryāvarta)
- Bharadvāja – (Udichya Āryāvarta – Northern Āryāvarta)
- Bhārgava – (Prachya Āryāvarta – Eastern Āryāvarta)
- Bharukaccha / Bhanukaccha (Vayu), Bhīrukahcha (Markandeya), Dārukachchha (Vamana), Sahakaccha (Brahmanda) – (Aparanta Āryāvarta – Western Āryāvarta)
- Bhogavardhana / Bhokardan (Dakshinapatha Āryāvarta – Southern Āryāvarta)
- Bhūṣika (Bhushika) – (Udichya Āryāvarta – Northern Āryāvarta)
- Bodha / Bāhya (Matsya) – (Madhya-desha Āryāvarta – Central Āryāvarta)
- Brahmottara / Suhmottara (Matsya), Samantara (Brahmanda) – (Prachya Āryāvarta – Eastern Āryāvarta)
- Carmakhaṇḍika (Charmakhandika) / Attakhaṇḍika (Matsya), Sakheṭaka (Vamana) – (Udichya Āryāvarta – Northern Āryāvarta)
- Darada – (Udichya Āryāvarta – Northern Āryāvarta)
- Darva – (Himalayan and Northern in Vayu and Markandeya, Parvata-shrayin and Udichya Āryāvarta – Himalayan Āryāvarta)
- Daśeraka (Dasheraka) / Karseruka (Vayu), Kuśeruka (Markandeya) – (Udichya Āryāvarta – Northern Āryāvarta)
- Daśamālika (Dashamalika) / Daśanāmaka (Matsya), Daśamānika (Vayu), Daṅśana (Vamana) – (Udichya Āryāvarta – Northern Āryāvarta)
- Daśarṇa (Dasharna) (Vindhya-prashtha Āryāvarta – Vindhyan Āryāvarta)
- Druhyu / Hrada (Vayu), Bhadra (Brahmanda) – (Udichya Āryāvarta – Northern Āryāvarta)
- Durga / Durgala (Brahmanda) – (Aparanta Āryāvarta – Western Āryāvarta)
- Ganaka – (Udichya Āryāvarta – Northern Āryāvarta)
- Gāndhāra / Gandharians (Vaēkərəta in Avestan) – the people who lived in Gāndhāra and spoke Gandhari (Udichya Āryāvarta – Northern Āryāvarta)
- Gonarda / Govinda (Vayu), Gomanta (Markandeya), Mananda (Vamana) – (Prachya Āryāvarta – Eastern Āryāvarta)
- Haṃsamārga / Sarvaga (Himalayan) in Matsya; Haṃsamārga (Northern and Himalayan) in Vayu and Markandeya; Karnamārga (Northern) and Haṃsamārga (Himalayan) in Vamana; Haṃsamārga (Himalayan) Haṃsabhaṅga (Northern) in Brahmanda – (Udichya Āryāvarta – Northern Āryāvarta; Parvata-shrayin Āryāvarta – Himalayan Āryāvarta)
- Hāramuṣika (Haramushika) / Hāramūrtika (Matsya), Hārapūrika (Vayu), Sāmuṣaka (Vamana) – (Udichya Āryāvarta – Northern Āryāvarta)
- Huhuka / Samudgaka (Matsya), Sahūdaka (Vayu), Sakṛtraka (Markandeya), Śahuhūka (Vamana), Sahuhūka (Brahmanda) – (Parvata-shrayin Āryāvarta – Himalayan Āryāvarta)
- Ijika (Udichya Āryāvarta – Northern Āryāvarta)
- Jaguda / Jāṇgala (Matsya), Juhuḍa (Vayu), Jāguḍa (Markandeya) – (Udichya Āryāvarta – Northern Āryāvarta)
- Jāṇgala – (Madhya-desha Āryāvarta – Central Āryāvarta)
- Jñeyamarthaka / Jñeyamallaka (Markandeya), Aṅgiyamarṣaka (Vamana), Gopapārthiva (Brahmanda) – (Aparanta Āryāvarta – Western Āryāvarta)
- Kachchhika / Kāchchhīka (Matsya), Kacchīya (Vayu), Kāśmīra (Markandeya), Kacchipa (Brahmanda) – (Aparanta Āryāvarta – Western Āryāvarta)
- Kālatoyaka – (Udichya Āryāvarta – Northern Āryāvarta)
- Kaliṅga (central) / Arkalinga (Markandeya) – (Madhya-desha Āryāvarta – Central Āryāvarta)
- Kaliṅga (southern) – (Dakshinapatha Āryāvarta – Southern Āryāvarta)
  According to political scientist Sudama Misra, the Kalinga janapada originally comprised the area covered by the Puri and Ganjam districts.
- Kalitaka / Kālītaka (Vayu), Anīkaṭa (Markandeya), Tālīkaṭa (Vamana), Kuntala (Brahmanda) – (Aparanta Āryāvarta – Western Āryāvarta)
- Kalivana / Kolavana (Vayu), Kālivala (Markandeya), Vāridhana (Vamana), Kalivana (Brahmanda) – (Aparanta Āryāvarta – Western Āryāvarta)
- Kantakara / Kanṭakāra (Matsya), Raddhakaṭaka (Vayu), Bahubhadra (Markandeya), Kādhara (Vamana) – (Udichya Āryāvarta – Northern Āryāvarta)
- Kāraskara / Paraṣkara (Vayu), Kaṭhākṣara (Markandeya), Karandhara (Brahmanda) – (Aparanta Āryāvarta – Western Āryāvarta)
- Kārūṣa (Karusha), later Cedi (Chedi) – Southern and Vindhyan Āryāvarta (Matsya) (Dakshinapatha Āryāvarta – Southern Āryāvarta; Vindhya-prashtha Āryāvarta – Vindhyan Āryāvarta)
- Kāśi (Kashi) (Madhya-desha Āryāvarta – Central Āryāvarta)
- Kasmira (Kashmira / Kāmīra) – (Udichya Āryāvarta – Northern Āryāvarta)
- Kathas – in the River Chenab Valley (Udichya Āryāvarta – Northern Āryāvarta)
- Kauśika – (Madhya-desha Āryāvarta – Central Āryāvarta)
- Kekeya / Kaikeyya (Matsya), Kaikeya (Markandeya), Kaikeya (Vamana) – (Udichya Āryāvarta – Northern Āryāvarta)
- Khaśa / Khasha – Khaśa (Vamana), Śaka (Brahmanda) – (Parvata-shrayin Āryāvarta – Himalayan Āryāvarta)
- Kisaṇṇa – (Madhya-desha Āryāvarta – Central Āryāvarta)
- Koṅkaṇa – (Dakshinapatha Āryāvarta – Southern Āryāvarta)
- Kośala (Central) – (Madhya-desha Āryāvarta – Central Āryāvarta)
- Kośala (Vindhyan) – (Vindhya-prashtha Āryāvarta – Vindhyan Āryāvarta)
- Kukkuṭa – (Udichya Āryāvarta – Northern Āryāvarta)
- Kulūta / Ulūta (Brahmanda) – (Udichya Āryāvarta – Northern Āryāvarta)
- Kulya – only Central in Markandeya; only Southern in Vamana and Brahmanda – (Dakshinapatha Āryāvarta – Southern Āryāvarta; Madhya-desha – Central Āryāvarta)
- Kuninda / Pulinda (Matsya), Kaliṅga (Markandeya), Kalinda (Brahmanda) – (Udichya Āryāvarta – Northern Āryāvarta)
- Kuśalya (Kushalya) – (Madhya-desha Āryāvarta – Central Āryāvarta)
- Kuśūdra (Kushudra) – (Madhya-desha Āryāvarta – Central Āryāvarta)
- Kuthaprāvaraṇa / Kuśaprāvaraṇa (Vayu), Kuntaprāvaraṇa (Markandeya), Apaprāvaraṇa (Brahmanda) – (Parvata-shrayin Āryāvarta – Himalayan Āryāvarta)
- Lalhitta – (Udichya Āryāvarta – Northern Āryāvarta)
- Lampāka / Lamaka (Brahmanda) – (Udichya Āryāvarta – Northern Āryāvarta)
- Madguraka / Mudgara (Markandeya), Mudagaraka (Brahmanda) – (Prachya Āryāvarta – Eastern Āryāvarta)
- Madras – in the River Chenab Valley (Udichya Āryāvarta – Northern Āryāvarta)
- Mādreya – (Madhya-desha Āryāvarta – Central Āryāvarta)
- Magadha / Central and Eastern in Vayu and Brahmanda – Magadha (Prachya Āryāvarta – Eastern Āryāvarta)
- Maharāṣṭra (Maharashtra) / Navarāṣṭra (Matsya) – Maharashtra (Dakshinapatha Āryāvarta – Southern Āryāvarta)
- Māheya – (Aparanta Āryāvarta – Western Āryāvarta)
- Mālada / Mālava (Matsya), Manada (Markandeya), Mansāda (Vamana) – (Prachya Āryāvarta – Eastern Āryāvarta)
- Malaka – (Madhya-desha Āryāvarta – Central Āryāvarta)
- Malavartika – Mallavarṇaka (Matsya), Mālavartin (Vayu), Mānavartika (Markandeya), Baladantika (Vamana) – (Prachya Āryāvarta – Eastern Āryāvarta)
- Mālava / Western Malla (known as Malloí by the ancient Greeks and Malli by ancient Romans) – they were a people from southern Punjab, including today's Multan city (Mallorum Metropolis) and region, south of the confluence of the Jhelum, Hydaspes for the Greeks, and Ravi, Hydraotes for the Greeks, rivers (see map 8), they are mentioned by ancient Greek historians in the telling of Alexander III of Macedon's or Alexander the Great (Iskandar) Mallian Campaign; Malada (Brahmanda), Ekalavya (Vamana) (Aparanta Āryāvarta – Western Āryāvarta) (not to be confused with the Eastern Malla)
- Malla / Eastern Malla / Śālva (Matsya), Māla (Vayu), Māia (Vamana) – (Prachya Āryāvarta – Eastern Āryāvarta) (not to be confused with the Mālava or Malavas of Western Ancient India – Aparanta Āryāvarta – Western Āryāvarta)
- Maṇḍala / Mālava (Vayu), Mālava (Markandeya) – (Parvata-shrayin Āryāvarta – Himalayan Āryāvarta)
- Māṇḍavya – (Udichya Āryāvarta – Northern Āryāvarta)
- Māṣa (Masha) – (Vindhya-prashtha Āryāvarta – Vindhyan Āryāvarta)
- Mātaṅga – (Prachya Āryāvarta – Eastern Āryāvarta)
- Matsya / Yatstha (Vamana) – (Madhya-desha Āryāvarta – Central Āryāvarta)
- Mekala / Rokala (Vayu), Kevala (Markandeya) – (Vindhya-prashtha Āryāvarta – Vindhyan Āryāvarta)
- Mūka – (Madhya-desha Āryāvarta – Central Āryāvarta)
- Nāsikya / Vāsikya (Matsya), Nāsikānta (Vamana), Nāsika (Brahmanda) – (Aparanta Āryāvarta – Western Āryāvarta)
- Nirāhāra / Nigarhara (Vayu), Nihāra (Markandeya) – (Parvata-shrayin Āryāvarta – Himalayan Āryāvarta)
- Pāṇavīya – (Udichya Āryāvarta – Northern Āryāvarta)
- Pāñcala (Panchala) – (Madhya-desha Āryāvarta – Central Āryāvarta)
- Pārada / Parita (Vayu), Pāravata (Vamana) – (Udichya Āryāvarta – Northern Āryāvarta)
- Paṭaccara (Patachchara) / Śatapatheśvara (Vayu) – (Madhya-desha Āryāvarta – Central Āryāvarta)
- Pūru (Puru) – Ancestors of the Paurava (Madhya-desha Āryāvarta – Central Āryāvarta)
  - Paurava – Descendants of the Puru (Madhya-desha Āryāvarta – Central Āryāvarta)
    - Kuru (Vamana) – Ancestors of the Kaurava (Madhya-desha Āryāvarta – Central Āryāvarta)
      - Kaurava (Vamana) – Descendants of the Kuru (Madhya-desha Āryāvarta – Central Āryāvarta)
    - Pandu – Ancestors of the Pandava (Udichya Āryāvarta – Northern Āryāvarta)
      - Pandava – Descendants of Pandu (Udichya Āryāvarta and Madhya-desha Āryāvarta – Northern Āryāvarta and Central Āryāvarta)
        - Arjunayana – (Madhya-desha Āryāvarta – Central Āryāvarta)
          - Tomara / Tāmasa (Markandeya and Vamana) – (Udichya Āryāvarta – Northern Āryāvarta)
- Pluṣṭa (Plushta) – (Parvata-shrayin Āryāvarta – Himalayan Āryāvarta)
- Prāgjyotiṣa (Pragjyotisha) – (Prachya Āryāvarta – Eastern Āryāvarta)
- Pravaṅga / Plavaṅga (Matsya and Brahmanda) – (Prachya Āryāvarta – Eastern Āryāvarta)
- Prāvijaya / Prāviṣeya (Brahmanda) – (Prachya Āryāvarta – Eastern Āryāvarta)
- Priyalaukika / Harṣavardhana (Markandeya), Aṅgalaukika (Vamana), Aṅgalaukika (Brahmanda) – (Udichya Āryāvarta – Northern Āryāvarta)
- Puleya / Kulīya (Matsya), Pulinda (Markandeya), Pulīya (Vamana), Pauleya (Brahmanda) – (Aparanta Āryāvarta – Western Āryāvarta)
- Rūpasa / Kūpasa (Vayu), Rūpapa (Markandeya), Rūpaka (Brahmanda) – (Aparanta Āryāvarta – Western Āryāvarta)
- Sainika / Pidika (Vayu), Śūlika (Markandeya), Jhillika (Brahmanda) – (Udichya Āryāvarta – Northern Āryāvarta)
- Śālva (Shalva) – (Madhya-desha Āryāvarta – Central Āryāvarta)
- Saraja – (Vindhya-prashtha Āryāvarta – Vindhyan Āryāvarta)
- Sārasvata – (Aparanta Āryāvarta – Western Āryāvarta)
- Sauśalya (Saushalya) – (Madhya-desha Āryāvarta – Central Āryāvarta)
- Sauvīra – (Udichya Āryāvarta – Northern Āryāvarta)
- Śaśikhādrika (Shashikhadraka) – (Parvata-shrayin Āryāvarta – Himalayan Āryāvarta)
- Śatadruja (Shatadruja) / Śatadrava (Vamana) – (Udichya Āryāvarta – Northern Āryāvarta)
- Ṣaṭpura / Padgama (Matsya), Ṣaṭsura (Vayu), Paṭava (Markandeya), Bahela (Vamana) – (Vindhya-prashtha Āryāvarta – Vindhyan Āryāvarta)
- Sindhu / Saindhava – (Udichya Āryāvarta – Northern Āryāvarta)
- Sirāla / Surāla (Vayu), Sumīna (Markandeya), Sinīla (Vamana), Kirāta (Brahmanda) – (Aparanta Āryāvarta – Western Āryāvarta)
- Śudra (Shudra / Sudra) / Suhya (Brahmanda) – (Udichya Āryāvarta – Northern Āryāvarta) (not to be confused with the Shudra, a Varna)
- Sujaraka – (Prachya Āryāvarta – Eastern Āryāvarta)
- Śulakara (Shulakara) – (Udichya Āryāvarta – Northern Āryāvarta)
- Surāṣṭra (Surashtra) / Saurāṣṭra (Matsya) – (Aparanta Āryāvarta – Western Āryāvarta)
- Śūrpāraka / Sūrpāraka (Vayu), Sūryāraka (Markandeya), Sūryāraka (Brahmanda) – (Aparanta Āryāvarta – Western Āryāvarta)
- Śūrasena (Shurasena) / Braj – (Madhya-desha Āryāvarta – Central Āryāvarta)
- Taittrika / Taittirika (Matsya), Turasita (Vayu), Kurumini (Markandeya), Tubhamina (Vamana), Karīti (Brahmanda) – (Aparanta Āryāvarta – Western Āryāvarta)
- Taksas – in Taksasila or Taxila (Udichya Āryāvarta – Northern Āryāvarta)
- Talagana / Talagāna (Matsya), Stanapa (Vayu), Tāvakarāma (Vamana), Tālaśāla (Brahmanda) – (Udichya Āryāvarta – Northern Āryāvarta)
- Tāmasa / Chamara (Matsya), Tomara (Vamana), Tāmara (Brahmanda) – (Parvata-shrayin Āryāvarta – Himalayan Āryāvarta)
- Tāmas – (Aparanta Āryāvarta – Western Āryāvarta)
- Tāmralipataka – (Prachya Āryāvarta – Eastern Āryāvarta)
- Taṅgaṇa / Apatha (Matsya), Gurguṇa (Markandeya) – (Parvata-shrayin Āryāvarta – Himalayan Āryāvarta)
- Taṅgaṇa / Tuṅgana (Markandeya) – (Udichya Āryāvarta – Northern Āryāvarta)
- Tāpasa / Svāpada (Markandeya), Tāpaka (Brahmanda) – (Aparanta Āryāvarta – Western Āryāvarta)
- Tilaṇga – (Madhya-desha Āryāvarta – Central Āryāvarta)
- Traipura – (Vindhya-prashtha Āryāvarta – Vindhyan Āryāvarta)
- Trigarta – (Parvata-shrayin Āryāvarta – Himalayan Āryāvarta)
- Tugras – in the Sutlej river basin (Udichya Āryāvarta – Northern Āryāvarta)
- Tūrṇapāda – (Udichya Āryāvarta – Northern Āryāvarta)
- Utkala – (Eastern and Central in Brahmanda – Vindhyan Āryāvarta)
- Uttamārṇa / Uttama (Brahmanda) – (Vindhya-prashtha Āryāvarta – Vindhyan Āryāvarta)
- Vāhyatodara / Girigahvara (Brahmanda) – (Udichya Āryāvarta – Northern Āryāvarta)
- Vaidiśa (Vaidisha) / Vaidika (Vayu), Kholliśa (Vamana) – (Vindhya-prashtha Āryāvarta – Vindhyan Āryāvarta)
- Vaṅga – Central and Eastern in Vamana – (Prachya Āryāvarta – Eastern Āryāvarta)
- Vāṅgeya / Mārgavageya (Matsya), Rāṅgeya (Markandeya), Vojñeya (Brahmanda) – (Prachya Āryāvarta – Eastern Āryāvarta)
- Vāṭadhāna – (Udichya Āryāvarta – Northern Āryāvarta)
- Vatsa / Vamsa – (Madhya-desha Āryāvarta – Central Āryāvarta)
- Vātsīya – (Aparanta Āryāvarta – Western Āryāvarta)
- Vemaka – (Udichya Āryāvarta – Northern Āryāvarta)
- Videha – (Prachya Āryāvarta – Eastern Āryāvarta) (Mithila / Tirabhukti)
- Vṛka (Vrika) – (Madhya-desha Āryāvarta – Central Āryāvarta)
- Yadu
  - Haihayas / Heheya (Talajangha)
    - Avanti – Clan of the Haihayas (Central and Vindhyan Āryāvarta in Matsya)
    - Bhoja / Gopta (Vamana) (Gupta) – Clan of the Haihayas (Vindhya-prashtha Āryāvarta – Vindhyan Āryāvarta in Vamana)
    - Sharyatas – Clan of the Haihayas.
      - Ānarta / Āvantya in Markandeya, Vamana – Subclan of the Sharyatas (Aparanta Āryāvarta – Western Āryāvarta)
    - Tuṇḍikera / Śauṇḍikera (Matsya), Tuṣṭikāra (Markandeya) – Clan of the Haihayas. (Vindhyan Āryāvarta)
    - Vītihotra / Vīrahotra (Markandeya), Vītahotra (Vamana) – Clan of the Haihayas (Vindhyan Āryāvarta)
  - Cedi (Chedi) / Chaidyas
  - Shashabindu / Shashabindava –
  - Vaidarbha / Vidarbha (Mahabharata) – Vidarbha (Dakshinapatha Āryāvarta – Southern Āryāvarta)
  - Yadava – Descendants of the Yadu
    - Ābhīra – (Udichya and Dakshinapatha Āryāvarta – Northern and Southern Āryāvarta)
      - Northern Ābhīra (Udichya Āryāvarta – Northern Āryāvarta)
      - Southern Ābhīra (Dakshinapatha Āryāvarta – Southern Āryāvarta)
    - Kukura –
    - Satvata –
    - Vrishni –
      - Shainya / Shaineya
- Yaudheya – (Madhya-desha Āryāvarta – Central Āryāvarta)

== Mahajanapadas (c. 500 BCE) ==
Map 8: Mahajanapadas roughly in 500 BCE.

महाजनपद – Mahajanapada Shodasa Mahajanapadas (Sixteen Mahajanapadas) The Mahajanapadas were sixteen great kingdoms and republics that emerged after the more powerful political entities (initially based on the territories of peoples and tribes) had conquered many others. According to the Anguttara Nikaya, Digha Nikaya, Chulla-Niddesa (Buddhist Canon)

- Anga
- Assaka (or Asmaka)
- Avanti
- Chetiya (Chedi / Cedi)
- Gandhara
- Kamboja (possibly ancestral of Nuristani)
- Kashi / Kasi
- Kosala
- Kuru
- Maccha (Matsya)
- Magadha
- Malla
- Panchala (Pañcāla)
- Surasena
- Vajji (Vṛji))
  - Licchavis (tribe)
  - Nāya
- Vamsha (Vatsa)

According to the Vyākhyāprajñapti / Bhagavati Sutra (Jain text)

- Accha
- Anga
- Avaha
- Bajji (Vajji / Vriji)
  - Licchavis (tribe)
- Banga / Vanga
- Kasi / Kashi
- Kochcha
- Kosala
- Ladha / Lata
- Magadha
- Malavaka
- Malaya (located in the Malaya mountains, southernmost part of the Western Ghats, part of the same was called the Sahya Mountains, Southern India) (probably Dravidian and Non-Indo-Aryan)
- Moli / Malla
- Padha
- Sambhuttara
- Vaccha (Vatsa)

== Mentions by Ancient Greek authors ==
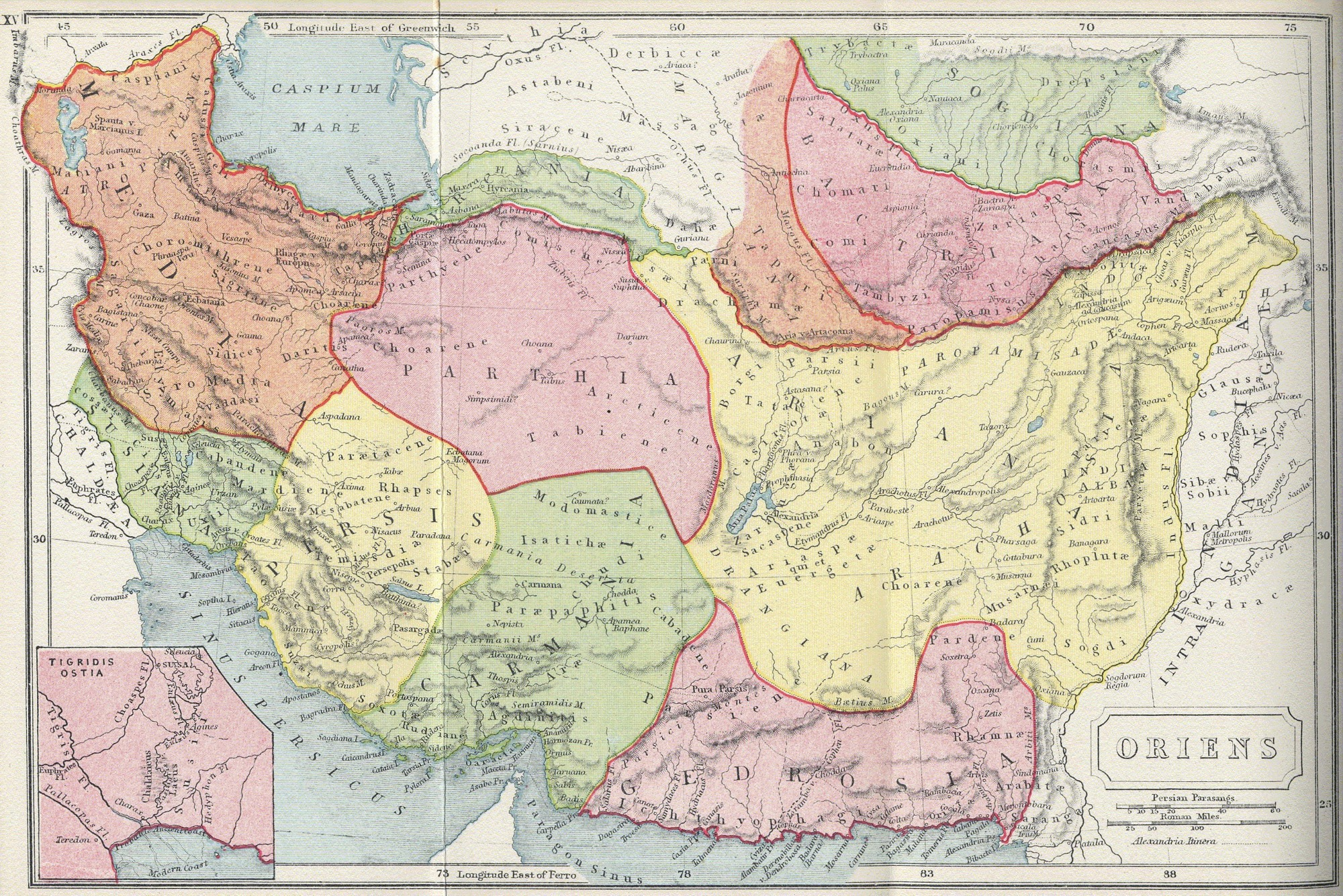
Map 9: Ancient regions of Iranian Plateau and part of South Central Asia showing ancient Iranian peoples and tribes; this map also shows ancient peoples of the Indus Valley in Northwest Ancient India.

Northwest Ancient India – Indus River Basin

- Glausae (Glausaí) (may have been the Gandhari?)
- Malloí / Malli (known as Mālava / Western Malla by Indo-Aryans in ancient India) – they were a people from Malwa (Punjab), including today's Multan city (Mallorum Metropolis) and region, south of the confluence of the Jhelum, Hydaspes for the Greeks, and Ravi, Hydraotes for the Greeks, rivers (see map 9), they are mentioned by ancient Greek historians in the Mallian Campaign of Alexander III of Macedon (Iskandar); Malada (Brahmanda), Ekalavya (Vamana) (Aparanta Āryāvarta – Western Āryāvarta) (not to be confused with the Eastern Malla)
- Oxydracae (Oxydrakaí) (may have been the Śudra (Shudra / Sudra) / Suhya (Brahmanda), not to be confused with the Shudra, a Varna)
- Sattagydans – people that dwelt in Sattagydia (Old Persian Thataguš; th = θ, from θata – "hundred" and guš – "cows", country of the People of "Hundred Cows"), may have been an Indo-Aryan people of Sindh with Iranian influence or the opposite, an Iranian people of Sindh with Indo-Aryan influence.
- Sibae / Sobii (Sibaí / Sivaí / Sobioí / Sivioí) (may have been the Śiva or Shiva people of Early Janapadas?) (not to be confused with the God Śiva or Shiva)

Other regions of Ancient India (India Intra Gangem)

- Pragii / Prasii (Pragioí / Prasioí) (may have been the people of Prāgjyotiṣa or Pragjyotisha, Pragjyotisha-Kamarupa?)

== Indo-Aryan or other tribes (possible) ==
- Alina (RV 7.18.7) (RV = Rigveda) – They were one of the tribes defeated by Sudas of the Bharatas at the Dasarajna (Ten Kings Battle). It is suggested that they lived to the north-east of the Kambojas (possible ancestors of the Nuristani that live in Nurestan) because in the 7th century CE, the land was mentioned by the Chinese pilgrim Xuanzang. It is possible that they are connected with the Alans or Alani people who are a nomadic Iranian tribe. Alans is a dialectal cognate of Aryāna, itself derived from the root arya-, meaning 'Aryan', the common self-designation of Indo-Iranian peoples. It probably came in use in the early history of the Alans for the purpose of uniting a heterogeneous group of tribes through the invocation of a common, ancestral 'Aryan' origin. The historian S. G. Talageri identifies them with the Greeks (Hellenes). However, the dating of the Rigveda and the hypothetical historic time for the Dasarajna-yuddha (Battle of Ten Kings) occurred millennia before Hellenes were recorded in India.
- Parsu (Parśu) – The Parsus have been connected with the Persians based on the evidence of an Assyrian inscription from 844 BC referring to the Persians as Parshu, and the Behistun Inscription of Darius I of Persia referring to Parsa as the home of the Persians. Pârsâ, is the Old Persian name for the Persis region Pars province as well as the root for the term Persian.
- Shakya – a clan of Iron Age India (1st millennium BCE), habitating an area in Greater Magadha, on the foothills of the Himalaya mountains. This is also the clan in which Siddhartha Gautama (also known as Buddha or Shakyamuni – Sage of the Shakyas) (c. 6th to 4th centuries BCE) was born into, whose teachings became the foundation of Buddhism. According to Chandra Das, the name "Shakya" is derived from the Sanskrit word "śakya," which means "the one who is capable". Some scholars argue that the Shakya were of aboriginal Munda-origin while others speculate on a Scythian (Saka) origin (part of the Iranian peoples) and assimilated into Indo-Aryan peoples.

== Hypothetical Indo-Aryans ==
- Mitanni Indo Aryans (c. 1500–1300 BCE) – hypothetical ancient people of the northern Middle East in the Mitanni kingdom (part of today's far western Iran, northwestern Iraq, northern Syria and southeastern Turkey), that spoke the hypothetical Mitanni Indo-Aryan (a language that was superstrate of Hurrian, a non-Indo-European language) and merged with the Hurrians, many of them as a social elite, in the course of the Indo-Aryan migration (towards West in this case).

== See also ==
- Āryāvarta
- Avestan geography
- Bharata Khanda
- Bharatavarsha
- Chakravartin
- Iron Age India
- History of Hinduism
- Indo-Aryan migration
- Indus Valley civilisation
- Janapada and Mahajanapada
- Mahabharata
  - Historicity of the Mahabharata
- Monarchy in ancient India
- Ramayana
- Vedic period
