= Āryāvarta =

Ancient region of the Indian subcontinent

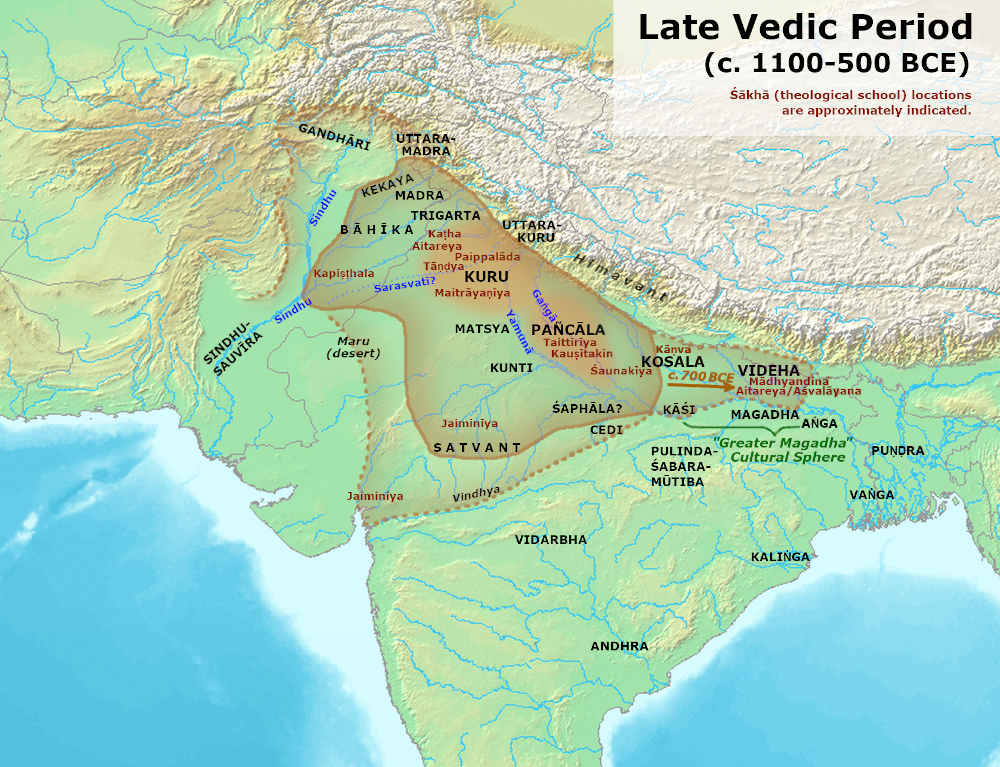
The approximate extent of Āryāvarta during the late Vedic period (c. 1100–500 BCE) Āryāvarta was limited to northwest India and the western Ganges plain, while Greater Magadha in the east was inhabited by non-Vedic Indo-Aryans and other people, who gave rise to Jainism and Buddhism.

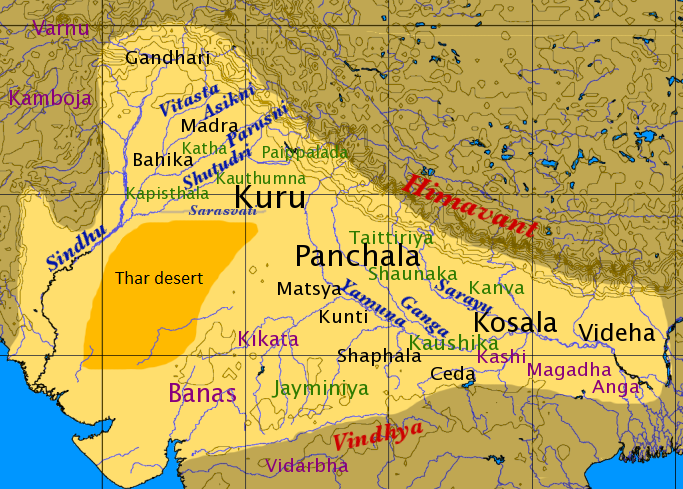
Map of the Indian subcontinent during the Vedic period

Archaeological cultures associated with the region of Āryāvarta, including Cemetery H, Late Harappan, Ochre Coloured Pottery (OCP), Copper Hoard, and Painted Grey Ware sites

Āryāvarta (Sanskrit: आ॒र्या॒वर्त॑, romanized: āryāvárta, lit. 'abode of the noble or excellent ones (Āryas)', (Note: The Sanskrit word आर्य॑ (ā́rya) was originally an endonym and a cultural term designating those who spoke Vedic Sanskrit and adhered to Vedic culture (including religious rituals and poetry), in contrast to an outsider, or अनार्य (anārya, 'non-Arya'). By the time of the Buddha (5th–4th century BCE), it took the meaning of 'noble'.) pronounced [ɑːɾ.jɑː.ʋɐ́ɾ.t̪ɐ]) is a term for the northern Indian subcontinent found in ancient Hindu texts such as the Dharmaśāstras and Sūtras. It refers to the areas of the Indo-Gangetic Plain and surrounding regions that were settled by Indo-Aryan tribes during and after the Indo-Aryan migrations, and where Indo-Aryan religion and rituals predominated. As reflected in various sources, the geographical limits of Āryāvarta expanded over time as the influence of Brahmanical ideology spread eastwards during the post-Vedic period.

== Geographical boundaries ==
=== Ganges-Yamuna doab ===
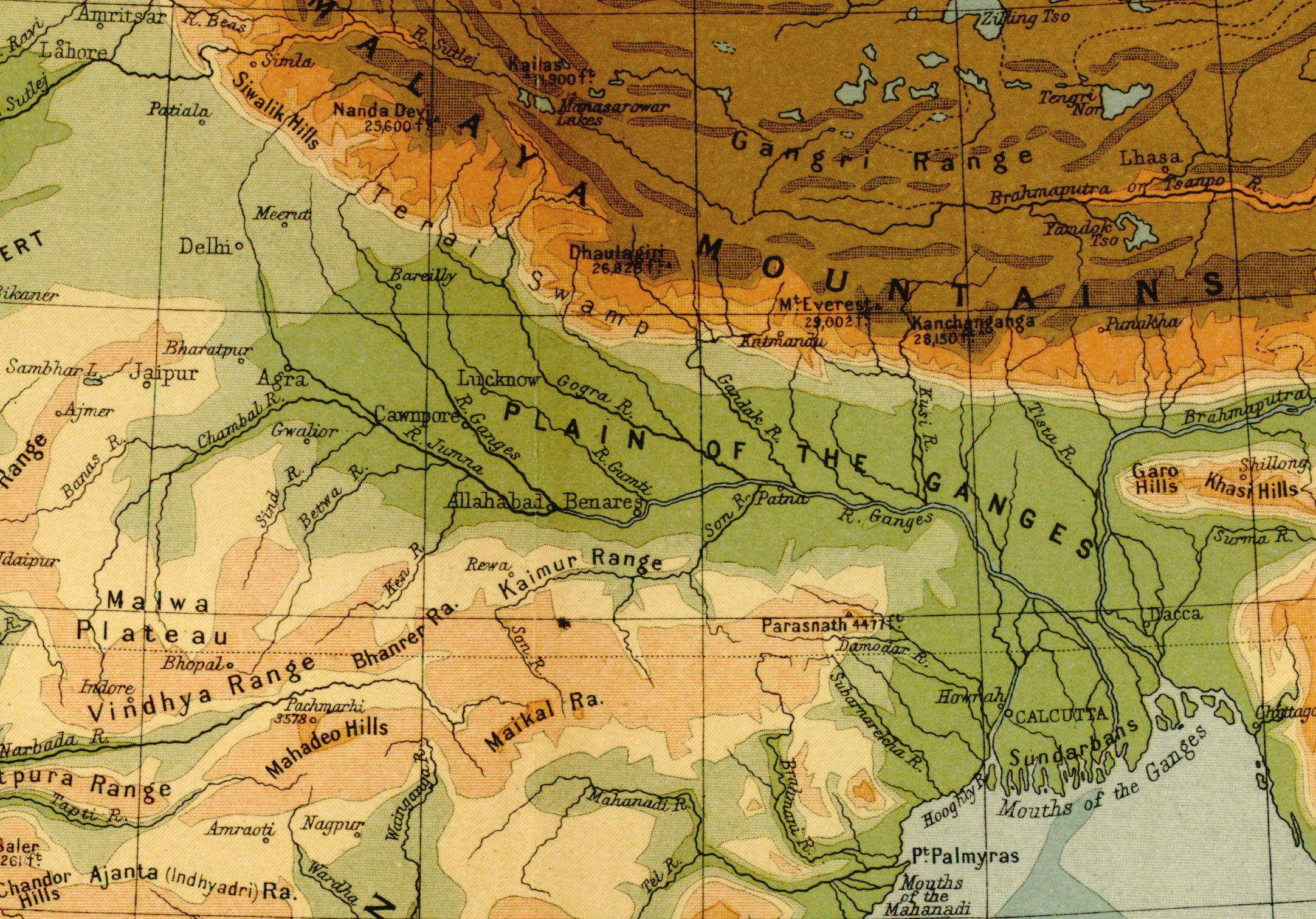
Course of the Ganges; Ganges-Yamuna doab western part of the green area.

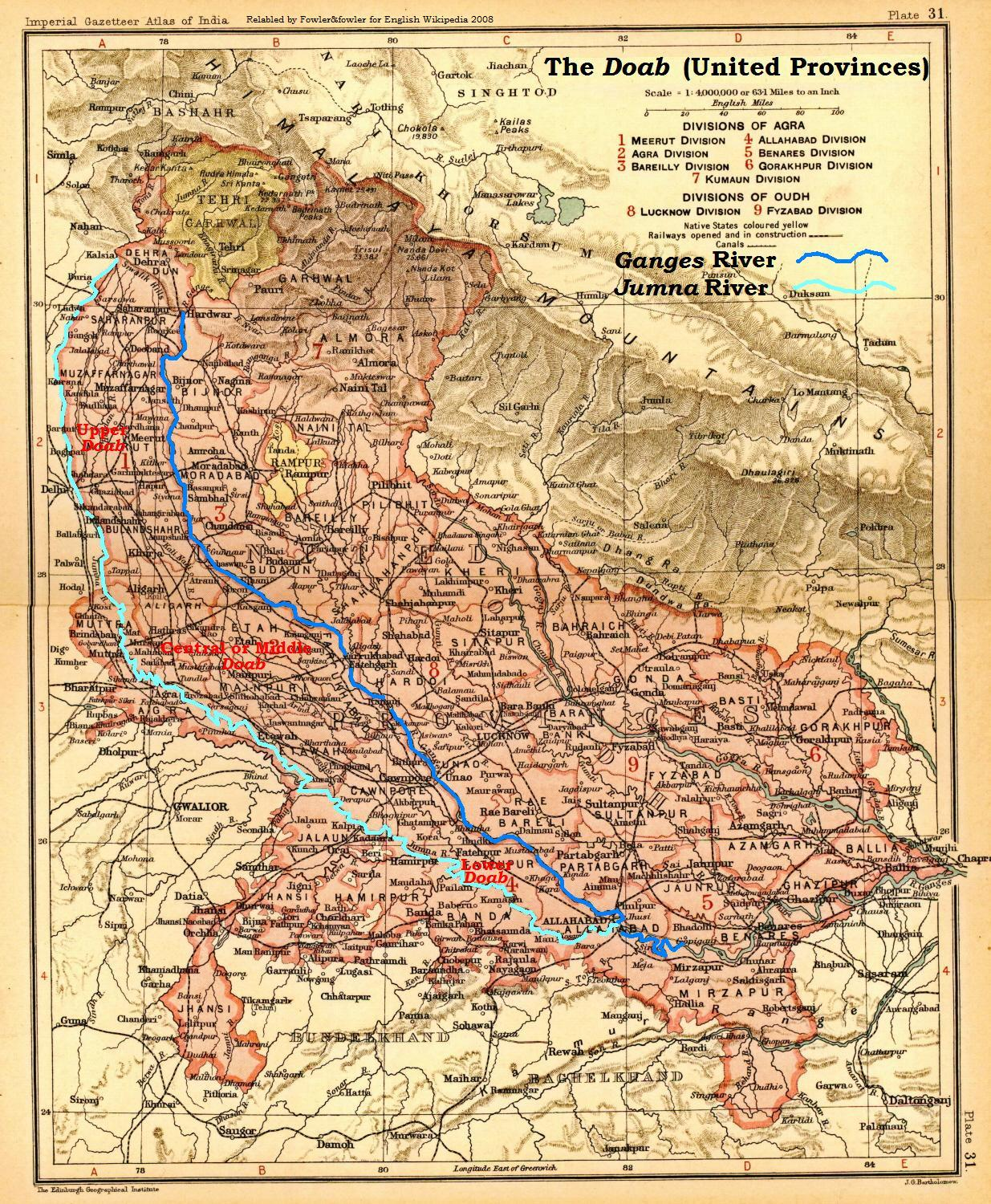
The Ganges-Yamuna doab.

The Baudhayana Dharmasutra (BDS) 1.1.2.10 (perhaps compiled in the 8th to 6th centuries BCE) declares that Āryāvarta is the land that lies west of Kālakavana, east of Adarsana, south of the Himalayas and north of the Vindhyas, but in BDS 1.1.2.11 Āryāvarta is confined to the doab of the Ganges-Yamuna. BDS 1.1.2.13-15 considers people from beyond this area as of mixed origin, and hence not worthy of emulation by the Aryans. Some sutras recommend expiatory acts for those who have crossed the boundaries of Aryavarta. Baudhayana Srautasutra recommends this for those who have crossed the boundaries of Aryavarta and ventured into far away places.

The Vasistha Dharma Sutra (oldest sutras ca. 500–300 BCE) I.8-9 and 12-13 locates the Āryāvarta to the east of the disappearance of the Sarasvati River in the desert, to the west of the Kālakavana, to the north of the Pariyatra Mountains and the Vindhya Range and to the south of the Himalayas.

Patanjali's Mahābhāṣya (mid-2nd century BCE) defines Āryāvarta like the Vashistha Dharmasutra. According to Bronkhost, he "situates it essentially in the Ganges plain, between the Thar Desert in the west and the confluence of the rivers Ganges (Ganga) and Jumna (Yamuna) in the east."

=== From sea to sea ===
The Manusmṛti (dated between 2nd cent. BCE to 3rd cent. CE) (2.22) gives the name to "the tract between the Himalaya and the Vindhya Ranges, from the Eastern Sea (Bay of Bengal) to the Western Sea (Arabian Sea)".

The Manava Dharmasastra (ca.150-250 CE) gives aryavarta as stretching from the eastern to the western seas, which Bronkhorst directly associates with the growing sphere of influence of the Brahmanical ideology.

=== Greater Magadha and its association with Aryavarta ===
Following the description of Aryavarta in early Brahmanical sources, Bronkhorst notes that the Greater Magadha area was outside Aryavarta, the heartland of Vedic Brahmanism, and proposes that "Greater Magadha" had a distinct culture. According to Bronkhorst, Aryavarta was primarily associated with a single state, the Kuru kingdom. According to Bronkhorst, the various emperors of Magadha had little interest in Brahmanism, (Note: In contrast to the Jain legends which developed 900 years later, contemporary Greek evidence states that Chandragupta Maurya, the founder and first emperor of the Maurya Empire and grandfather of Ashoka, was associated with Vedic Brahminism. Chandragupta sponsored Vedic sacrifices and Brahmanical rituals. He also delighted in hunting, an activity not typically associated with the strict non-violence of later sectarian ascetic sects such as Jainism and Buddhism.) and the conquest of the Vedic heartland by the Nanda and Maurya rulers deprived the Brahmins of their patrons, threatening the survival of the Vedic ritual tradition and creating opportunities for Buddhists and Jains to spread their religions outside the confines of Magadha. According to Bronkhorst, the Brahmins overcame their deprivation of patrons by providing new services and by incorporating the non-Vedic Indo-Aryan religious heritage of the eastern Ganges plain along with local religious traditions, giving rise to the Hindu synthesis.

Geoffrey Samuel, following Thomas Hopkins, also proposed that the Central Gangetic region formed a "distinct but related cultural complex," as exemplified by the Painted Grey Ware, which did not spread past the Ganga-Yamuna Doab. (Note: Witzel (2009) makes the same observation (p.9): "Kosala, Videha, Magadha are not characterized by the expanding western, Kuru-dominated Painted Grey Ware (PGW) culture of Haryana and Uttar Pradesh [...] the East was characterized by the indigenous Black and Red Ware/Ochre Colored Pottery (BRW/OCP) culture that had only two-tiered settlements (villages and market places) during the pre-450 BCE period.") It was the area of the earliest known rice cultivation in South Asia, and had reached the Chalcolithic when the Aryans first entered northwestern India. According to Hopkins, the Aryan societies and this eastern Gangetic culture formed two separate sources for the development toward iron-working and urbanisation. According to Hopkins, the Brahmins of the Aryan, Vedic cultural sphere perceived this eastern, non-Aryan, Jain-Buddhist cultural sphere as wholly different, (Note: Hopkins, as quoted by Samuel (2010, p. 50): To say that there was tension between those two worlds - the non-Aryan/Buddhist/Jain world on the one hand, and the Aryan/Brahmanical/Vedic world on the other - is to understate the case. In the sixth century BCE there were really two different worlds, at least as perceived by their main representatives, or perhaps - as ssen especially by the Brahmins - two opposite worlds."") with a "world of female powers, natural transformation, sacred earth and sacred places, blood sacrifices, and ritualists who accept pollution on behalf of their community." (Note: Hopkins, as quoted by Samuel (2010, p. 51)) Yet, Samuel notes that the distinction "was cultural, not racial," assuming that "populations in both regions were mixtures of earlier Indo-Aryan and non-Indo-Aryan speaking populations." While forming different cultural spheres, they also interacted, and shared some common Indo-Aryan elements."

Critics have questioned some of these assertions. The claim of a sharp cultural divide between east and west was questioned by Konrad Klaus in his 2011 review of "Greater Magadha." According to Norelius, Wynne and Witzel questioned the supposed lesser influence of Brahmanisation in early Magadha, or Bronkhorst's proposed revision of textual chronology, while Fynne criticised Bronkhorst for overlooking the role of socioeconomic and political developments in shaping new ideological trends.

In his 2011 review, Wynne calls Bronkhorst's argument "compelling" and "persuasive," (Note: Wynne: "it can hardly be doubted that a distinct religious culture based on them emerged in and around the kingdom of Magadha. An overwhelming amount of evidence suggests that this rival to Vedic India dominated the growing urban civilization of the eastern Gangetic plains during the early Buddhist period, without any significant contribution from orthodox Brahminism.") but also notes that "Bronkhorst [...] argues that the ideas of karma, rebirth, and liberation originated within Greater Magadha," proposing later dates for some Upanishads to make this possible. Yet according to Wynne, "[t]his is problematic, however, because these ideas are stated in the Bṛhadāraṇyaka and Chāndogya Upaniṣads--texts usually assigned to the sixth or fifth century BCE, early enough to suppose an origin within the sphere of Vedic religion." Instead, Wynne proposes that the Yājñavalkya-kāṇḍa (Bṛhadāraṇyaka Upaniṣad chapters 3-4) was composed in the Videha-Kosala region by a Vedic school which was isolated from the Vedic mainstream, circulated as a separate work outside Aryavarta, and "was an important source for the ideas of karma, rebirth, and liberation," "eventually trigger[ing] the culture of world renunciation, asceticism, and meditation" as an "unintended consequence of the early Videhan kings’ attempt to legitimize their rule through the Vedic tradition."

Additionally, Patrick Olivelle, writing in 1993, is critical of scholars who portray the Śramaṇa seers of Magadha as non-Brahmanical, anti-Brahmanical, or even non-Aryan precursors of later sectarian ascetics. According to Olivelle, scholars who attempt to draw such sharp divisions are reaching conclusions that far exceed the available empirical evidence.

== Other regional designations ==
The Manusmṛti mentions Brahmavarta as the region between the Sarasvati and the Drishadvati in northwest India. The text defines the area as the place where the "good" people are born, the twice-born who adhere to the Vedic dharma, in contrast to the mlecchas, who live outside the Aryan territory and Vedic traditions. The precise location and size of the region has been the subject of academic uncertainty. Some scholars, such as the archaeologists Bridget Allchin and Raymond Allchin, believe the term Brahmavarta to be synonymous with Aryavarta.

Madhyadesa extended from the upper reaches of the Ganges and the Yamuna to the confluence of the two rivers at Prayaga, and was the region where, during the time of the Mahajanapadas, the Kuru kingdom and Pañcāla existed. The entire region is considered sacred in the Hindu mythology as gods and heroes mentioned in the two epics, the Ramayana and Mahabharata, lived here.

== Political history ==
Kanyakubja or modern day Kannauj was a central city of Aryavarta and was used as capital-city from 510 CE to 1197 CE under Maukharis, Harshavardhana, Varmans, Pratiharas and Gahadavala dynasty.

The Gurjara-Pratihara king in the tenth century was titled the Maharajadhiraja of Aryavarta. Devapala, the emperor of Pala Empire was known as the Overlord of Aryavarta.

== See also ==
- Names of India
- Airyanem Vaejah, its Zoroastrian counterpart
- History of India
- List of Ikshvaku dynasty kings in Hinduism

== Sources ==
Printed sources

- Bronkhorst, Johannes (2007). Greater Magadha: Studies in the Culture of Early India. BRILL. ISBN 9789004157194.
- Bronkhorst, Johannes (2011), Buddhism in the Shadow of Brahmanism, BRILL
- Bronkhorst, Johannes (2015), "The historiography of Brahmanism", in Otto; Rau; Rupke (eds.), History and Religion:Narrating a Religious Past, Walter deGruyter
- Bronkhorst, Johannes (2016), How the Brahmains Won, BRILL
- Bronkhorst, Johannes (2017), "Brahmanism: Its place in ancient Indian society", Contributions to Indian Sociology, 51 (3): 361–369, doi:10.1177/0069966717717587, S2CID 220050987
- Eraly, Abraham (2002), Gem In The Lotus, Penguin, ISBN 978-93-5118-014-2
- Jansari, Sushma (2023), Chandragupta Maurya: The creation of a national hero in India, UCL Press, ISBN 9781800083882
- Majumdar, R. C.; Raychauduhuri, H. C.; Datta, Kalikinkar (1960), An Advanced History of India, London: Macmillan & Company Ltd; New York: St Martin's Press
- Michaels, Axel (2004). Hinduism. Past and present. Princeton, New Jersey: Princeton University Press.
- Norelius, Per-Johan (2023). Soul and Self in Vedic India. BRILL. p. 459. ISBN 978-90-04-54600-4.
- Samuel, Geoffrey (2010). The Origins of Yoga and Tantra. Indic Religions to the Thirteenth Century. Cambridge University Press.
- Sastri, Kallidaikurichi Aiyah Nilakanta (1988), Age of the Nandas and Mauryas, Motilal Banarsidass, ISBN 978-81-208-0466-1

Web-sources
