= Porus (disambiguation) =

Porus may refer to:

- King Porus, an ancient Indian ruler who fought against Alexander the Great
- Porus the Younger, an Indian ruler, the nephew of the above Porus
- Porus (Attica), a deme of ancient Attica
- Porus (mythology), either of two related mythological figures in Greek classical literature or a third in Roman mythology
- Porus (TV series), Indian TV series based on Porus and Alexander the Great
- Porus, Jamaica, a village in Manchester, Jamaica
- Halpe porus, a butterfly belonging to the family Hesperiidae
- Dabasa porus, a butterfly belonging to the family Papilionidae
- Porus acusticus internus, the opening of the canal in the skull that carries nerves from inside the cranium towards the middle and inner ear compartments
- The Porus Islands in the Pemadumcook Chain of Lakes
- Tan Porus, a character in the Isaac Asimov short story Homo Sol
- Strator Porus, an agent of the New Canaanites, a despotic regime from the X-Men comic series
- Porus F.C., a football club on the list of football clubs in Jamaica
- Professor Porus Vesuna, head of the Department of Psychiatry at Baroda Medical College
- Typhlodromus porus, a mite on the list of Phytoseiidae species

== See also ==
- Puru (disambiguation)
- Poros (disambiguation)
