= Battle of the Ten Kings =

Battle recounted in the Rigveda

Date	c. 14th century BCE
Location	Near Parusni river (modern Ravi), Punjab
Result	Trtsu-Bharata victory
Territorial changes	Bharatas settle in Kurukshetra; Emergence of Kuru kingdom

Belligerents
Bharata; Trtsu	First Phase: Alina; Anu; Bhrigus; Bhalanas; Dasa (Dahae?); Druhyus; Turvasa; Yadus; Yakṣus; Matsya; Purus; Panis (Parni); Pakhtas; Vishanins; Sivas; Vaikarna; Second Phase: Bhida's forces; Ajas; Śighras; Yakṣus

Commanders and leaders
Sudas Paijavana; Vashishta	First Phase: Ten Kings; Vishwamitra; Second Phase: Bhida

The Battle of the Ten Kings (Sanskrit: दाशराज्ञयुद्धम्, IAST: Dāśarājñá yuddhám) was first alluded to in the 7th Mandala of the Rigveda (RV) and took place on the bank of river Parushni between a king of the Bharata tribe named Sudas, and a confederation of Puru, Yadu, Turvasa, Anu, Druhyu, Alina, Paktha, Bhalnas, Shiva and Vishanin tribes. It resulted in a decisive victory for the Bharatas and subsequent formation of the Kuru polity. The Battle of the Ten Kings, mentioned in the Rigveda may have "formed the 'nucleus' of story" of the Kurukshetra War in the Mahabharata.

== Battle ==
Book 3 of the Rig Veda states that the Bharata tribe crossed the Beas River and the Sutlej River, moving towards the (future) Kurukshetra area where they came across a nascent (and temporary) inter-tribal alliance of both Indo-Aryans and non-Indo-Aryans. This alliance was confronted in a battle, which is described in the 18th hymn (verses 5-21) of Book 7. The exact motivations are unclear; Michael Witzel argues that it might have been a product of intra-tribal resentment or intrigues of an ousted family priest, (Note: Book 3 was composed by Vishwamitra, the family priest of the Bharatas and makes no mention of the battle. Book 7 was composed by Vasistha, who replaced Vishwamitra. However, Jamison rejects that there exists any evidence of Vasistha-Vishwamitra feud in RV.) while Ranbir Chakravarti argues that the battle was probably fought for controlling the rivers, which were a lifeline for irrigation. The hymns also makes mention of the concurring tribes seeking to steal cows from the Bharatas.

Hanns-Peter Schmidt, whom Witzel deems to have produced the most "detailed, and ingenious reinterpretation" of the hymns, locates a unique poetic moment across the RV corpus, in their extraordinarily abundant usage of sarcastic allusions, similes and puns to mock the tribal alliance. Some of those allusions seem to be heavily context-specific and (still) remain unrecognized; there exist considerable disputes about interpretations of particular words, in light of the employed figures of speech and other poetic devices.

== First phase ==
The first phase of the battle took place on the banks of the Ravi River (then Parusni) near Manusa village, west of Kurukshetra. The Bharata king and their priest are respectively mentioned as Sudas Paijavana and Vasistha, in the Rig Veda; however the names change in Samaveda and Yajurveda Samhitas. The principal antagonist is doubtful, (Note: Karl Friedrich Geldner deemed it to be Bheda, incorrectly. Witzel proposes Trasadasyu. Palihawadana proposes Purukutsa, Trasadasyu's father.) and names of the participating tribes are difficult to retrieve, in light of the phonological deformations of their names. Plausible belligerents of the tribal union include (in order) Purus (erstwhile master-tribe of Bharatas), Yadu (probably commanded by Turvasa), Yaksu (relatively unimportant or a pun for Yadu), Matsyas, Druhyus, Pakthas, Bhalanas, Alinas, Vishanins, Sivas, Vaikarna, and Anu.

Though seemingly an unequal battle, going by the numbers (this aspect is highlighted multiple times in the hymns), Sudas decisively won against the tribal alliance by strategic breaching of a dyke on the river thereby drowning most (?) of the opponents. This sudden change in fortunes is attributed to the benevolence and strategizing of Indra, the patron-god of Bharatas, whose blessings were secured by Vasistha's poetics.

== Second phase ==
Thereafter, the battleground (probably) shifted to the banks of river Yamuna, wherein the local chieftain Bhida was defeated along with three other tribes — Ajas, Śighras, and the Yakṣus.

== Aftermath ==
The Battle of the Ten Kings led Bharatas to occupy the entire Puru territory of Western Punjab (then Sapta Sindhu) centered around Sarasvati River and complete their east-ward migration. Sudas celebrated his victory with the Ashvamedha ritual to commemorate the establishment of a realm, free of enemies from the north, east, and west. He still had enemies in the Khāṇḍava Forest to the south, which was inhabited by the despised (unknown if Indo-Aryan or non-Indo-Aryan) Kikatas.

A political realignment between Purus and Bharatas probably followed soon enough and might have included other factions of the tribal union as well; this is exhibited from how the core collection of RV prominently features clan-hymns of both the sides.

The territory would eventually become the first Indian Subcontinental "state" under the Kuru tribe in post-RV span. It became the heart-land of Brahminical culture and purity, which eventually would influence and transform Indian culture, merging with local traditions and developing into the Historical Vedic religion. The Purus went on to survive as a marginal power in Punjab; Witzel and some other scholars believe Porus (c. early 300 BCE) to be a king from the same tribe.

== Historicity ==
Numerous translators since the 1800s including K. F. Geldner have considered the battle as a historical event, based on the narration-characteristics of the verses. Witzel dates the battle between approximately 1450 and 1300 BCE; he deems the concerned hymns to be late interpolations. Stephanie W. Jamison warns against using it as a major source to reconstruct history since the description of the battle is "anything but clear."

Both Witzel and Jamison find the very next hymn (7.19, verse 3) to show a striking shift of allegiance with Indra helping Sudas as well the Purus, who won land.

Stephanie W. Jamison notes it to be the most famous historical conflict in RV—in that, it secured the dominance of Bharatas over Vedic tribes—as does Witzel.

== Possible prototype for the Kurukshetra War ==
Witzel notes this battle to be the probable archetype/prototype of the Kurukshetra War, narrated in the Mahabharata. John Brockington takes a similar approach. S. S. N. Murthy goes to the extent of proposing the battle as the very "nucleus" of the Kurukshetra War; Walter Ruben adopts a similar stance. However, Witzel maintains the nucleus text of the Mahabharata to be in description of some event in the Late Vedic spans; it was since reshaped (and expanded) over centuries of transmission and recreation to (probably) reflect the Battle of the Ten Kings. Alf Hiltebeitel rejects Witzel's and Brockington's arguments as "baffling fancy" and notes a complete lack of means to connect the battle with the "fratricidal struggle" of the Mahabharata.

== See also ==
- Kurukshetra War
- Mahabharata
- Historicity of the Mahabharata
