= Puru (Vedic tribe) =

Indo-Aryan tribes, c. 1700–1400 BCE

Puru Paurava
- Confederation
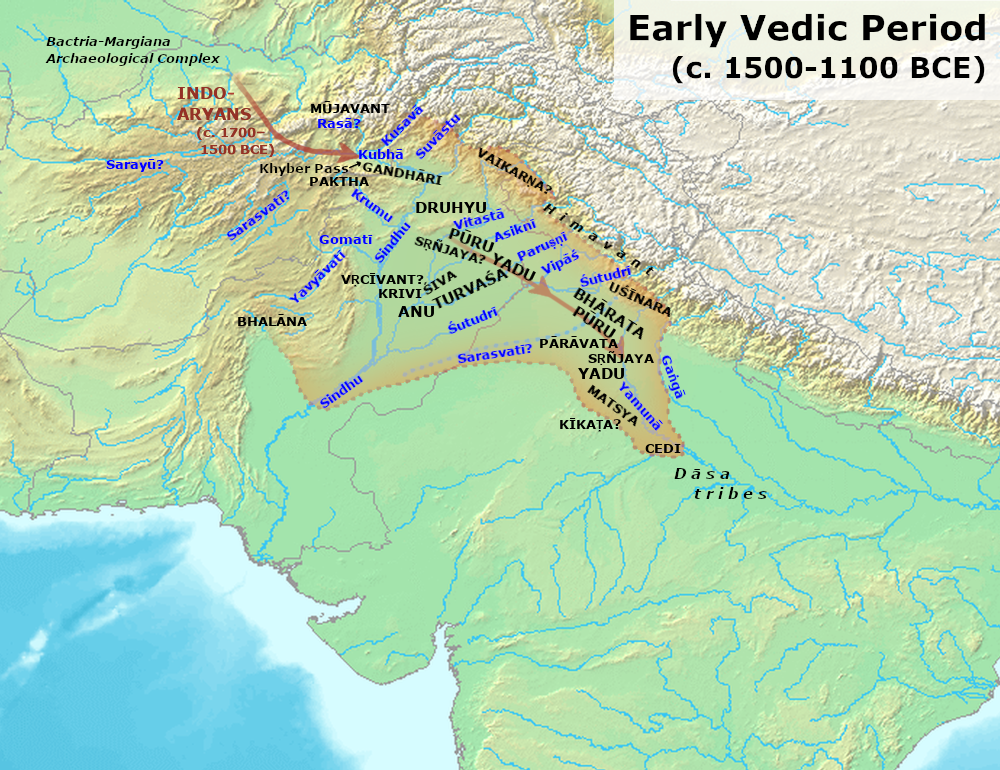
- The Purus and other early Vedic tribes
- Ethnicity: Indo-Aryan
- Location: Northern Indian subcontinent
- Varna: Kshatriya
- Descended from: Pururavas
- Parent tribe: First tribe of Chandra clan
- Branches: Bharatas
- Language: Vedic Sanskrit
- Religion: Historical Vedic religion
- Surnames: Puruvamsh

The Purus were an Indo-Aryan tribal alliance or a confederation of tribes that existed between 1700 and 1400 BCE. There were several factions of Purus, one being the Bharatas. The Purus and the Bharatas were the two most prominent tribes in most of the Rigveda. The chief of tribe was called Rajan. The Purus rallied many other groups against King Sudas of the Bharata, but were defeated in the Battle of the Ten Kings (RV 7.18, etc).

== Etymology ==
The name Puru is of possible Indo-Aryan origin.

== Rigveda ==
In Mandala 6, it is recalled that Purukutsa, chieftain of Purus, had destroyed autumnal forts in the Afghan mountains. In Mandala 4, it is stated that as a result of his Ashvamedha (Horse Sacrifice) with the horse Daurgaha, his son Trasadasyu was born.

In Mandala 4, Trasadasyu is the chieftain of the Purus. In addition to being the son of Purukutsa, Trasadasyu is also described as Gairikṣita, meaning descendant of Girikṣit. Trasadasyu lived on the western side of the Indus River (Sindhu) while Mandala 4 was being composed, but he also moved into the land of Seven Rivers and defeated the Anu-Druhyus and Yadu-Turvashas. He molded the conquered tribes and the Purus into the Pancha-janah (Five Peoples). To celebrate his victory he conducted an Ashvamedha with his horse, Dadhrikā. Dadhrikā is extolled in RV 4.38-40, and in these hymns, Dadhrikā is stated to have become a divine being, the sacrificial horse of the Ashvamedha, and a symbol of Puru and Indo-Aryan dominance. Trasadasyu's son was Tṛkṣi.

Scholars who adhere to Hermann Grassmann's interpretation of Rigveda 7.92.2 state that by Mandala 7, the Purus had reached the Sarasvati river.

== Claimants ==
Later rulers may have claimed lineage to the Puru clan to bolster their legitimacy. Modern scholars conjecture that Porus may have been a Puru king. However, Porus is not known in Indian sources.

== See also ==
Vedic period

- Vedas
- Bharatas (Vedic tribe)
- Yadava
- Janapada
- Rigvedic rivers
- Historical Vedic religion
- List of ancient Indo-Aryan peoples and tribes

History of India

- History of Hinduism
- List of Indian monarchs
- Indus Valley Civilization
- Outline of ancient India
- Pottery in the Indian subcontinent
