= Pakhtas =

Ancient Vedic Indo-Aryan tribe

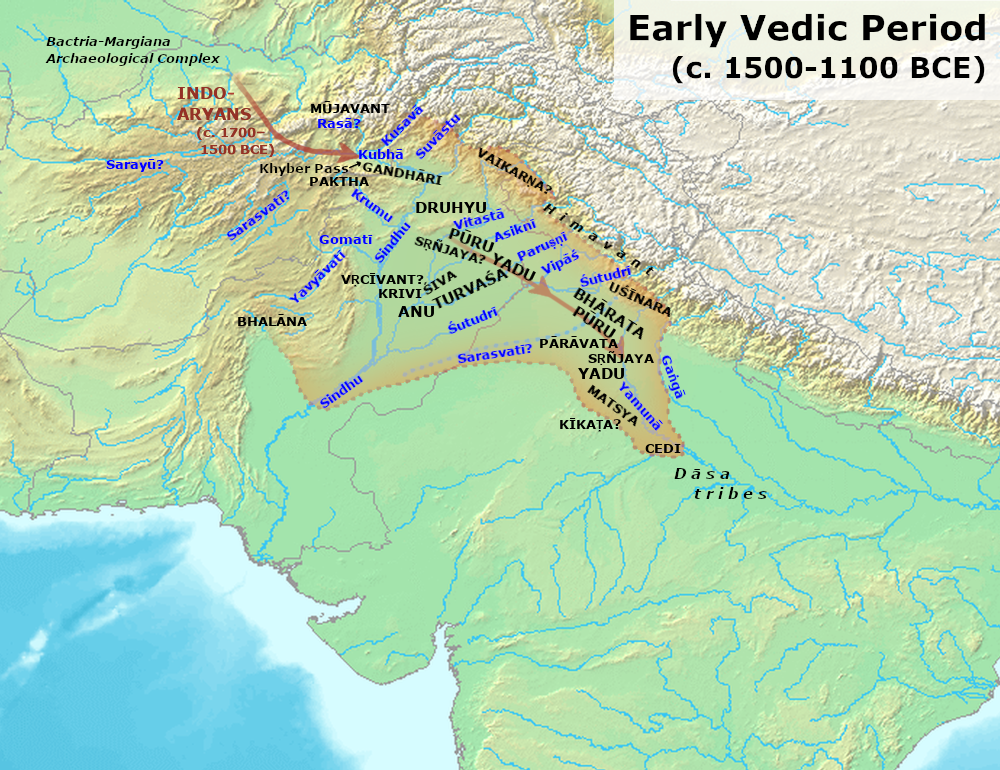
location of Pakthas among early Indo-Aryan peoples and tribes

Pakhtas or Pakthas was an ancient Vedic Indo-Aryan tribe living in the northern borderlands of South Asia. They are sometimes identified with the Pactyans of Herodotus.

It is theorised that they are the ancestors of modern Pashtuns, based on the phonetical similarity between the words Pakhta and Pakhtun (alternate for Pashtuns).

== See also ==
- Paktia Province
- Paktika Province
- Loya Paktia
