= Matsya (tribe) =

Ancient Hindu kingdom of India

Kingdom of Matsya Macchā
- c. 1400 BCE–c. 350 BCE
- Matsya Kingdom and other Mahajanapadas in the Post Vedic period.
- Capital: Virāṭanagara
- Common languages: Prakrits
- Religion: Historical Vedic religion Jainism; Buddhism
- Government: Monarchy
- Raja
- Historical era: Iron Age
  - Established: c. 1400 BCE
  - Disestablished: c. 350 BCE
Succeeded by
Magadha
- Today part of: India

Matsya (Pali: Macchā) was an ancient Indo-Aryan tribe of central India whose existence is attested during the Iron Age. The members of the Matsya tribe were organised into a kingdom called the Matsya kingdom.

== Etymology ==
Macchā in Pāli and Matsya in Sanskrit mean "fish".

== Location ==
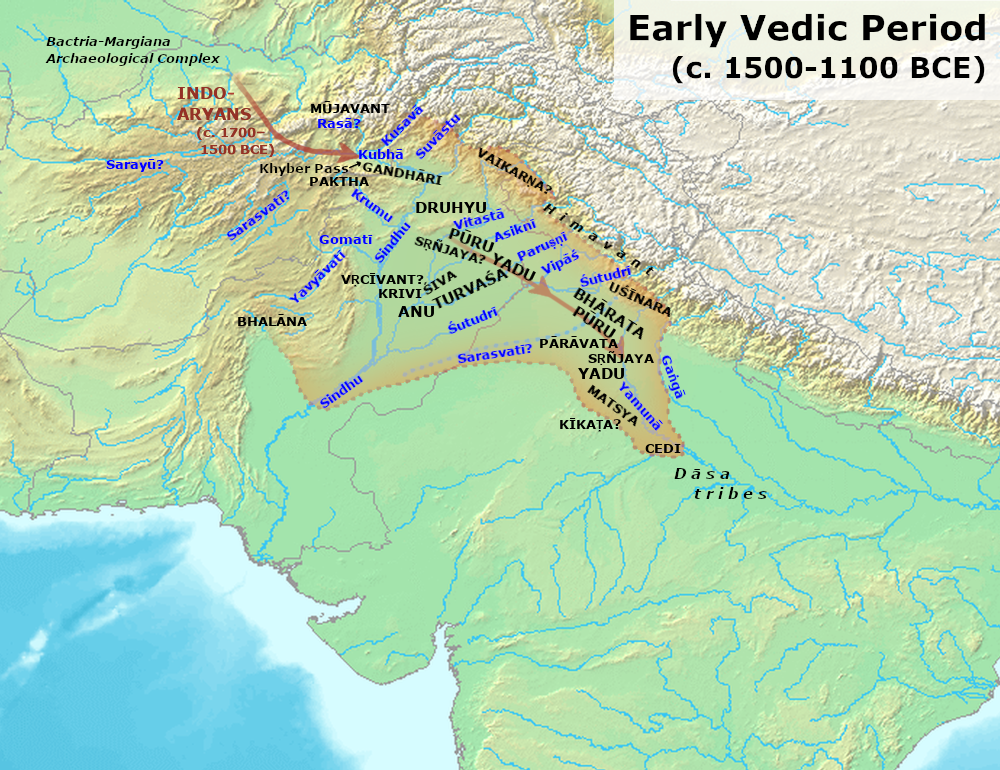
Location of the Matsyas among the Vedic tribes

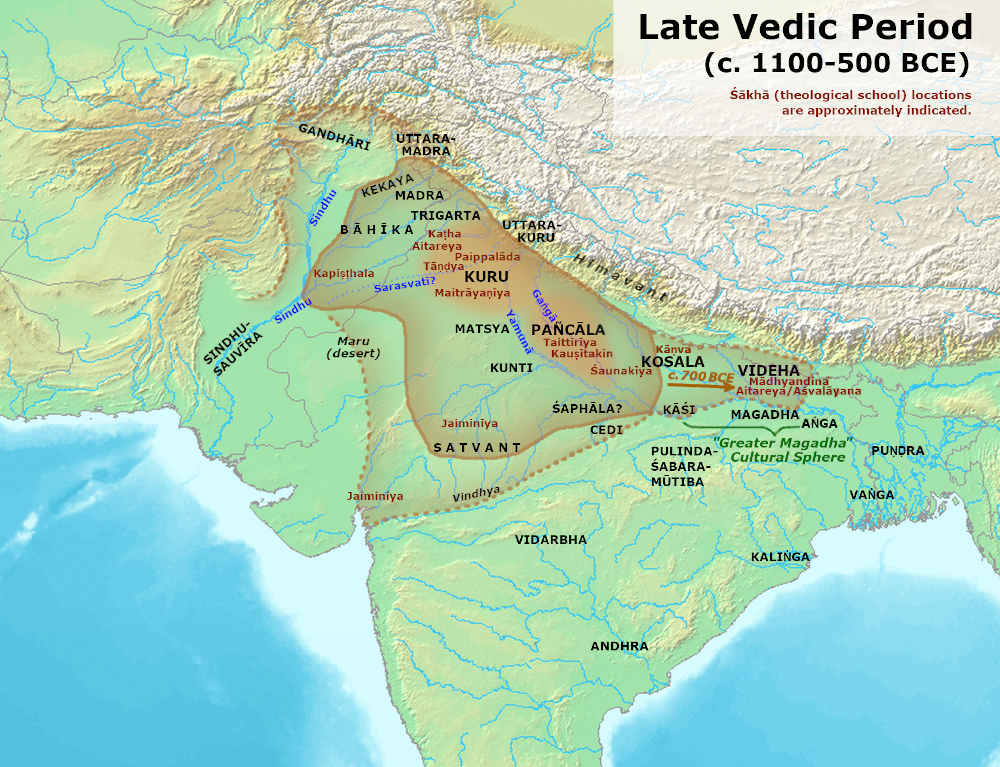
Location of Matsya during the late Vedic period

Location of Matsya during the post-Vedic period

The kingdom of Matsya covered an extensive territory, with the Sarasvatī river and the forests skirting it as its western border, and its southern boundaries being the hills near the Chambal River. Most of the kingdom comprised parts of present-day North-eastern Rajasthan. The neighbours of the Matsya state were Kuru in the north, and Sūrasena in the east.

The capital of Matsya was Virāṭanagara, which corresponds to the modern-day Bairāṭ in Jaipur district of Rajasthan.

== History ==
The Matsya tribe was first mentioned in the Ṛgveda, where they appear as one of the opponents of Sudās during the Battle of the Ten Kings.

According to the Śatapatha Brāhmaṇa, the king Dhvasan Dvaitavana of Matsya performed an aśvamedha sacrifice near the Sarasvatī river. A forest on the banks of the Sarasvatī and a lake were both named after the king Dvaitavana.

Vedic texts such as the Gopatha Brāhmaṇa mention Matsya along with the Śālva tribe, and the Kauśītaki Upaniṣad connects them with the Kuru-Pañcālas. Later Puranic texts, such as the Mahābhārata, connect Matsya with Trigarta and Cedi, and the Manu-Saṃhitā lists the countries of Matsya, Śūrasena, Pañcāla, and Kuru-kṣetra, as forming the Brahmarṣi-deśa (the holy enclave of the brāhmaṇa sages).

The later history of Matsya is not known, although the Buddhist Aṅguttara Nikāya included it among the sixteen Mahājanapadas ("great realms"), which were the most powerful states of India immediately before the birth of the Buddha. The Matsya state in the Mahājanapada period archaeologically corresponds to the Northern Black Polished Ware archaeological culture which in the western part of the Gaṅgā-Yamunā Doab region succeeded the earlier Painted Grey Ware culture, and is associated with the Kuru, Pañcāla, Matsya, Surasena and Vatsa Mahājanapadas.

Unlike other states of central India who abandoned the kingdom form for a gaṇasaṅgha (aristocratic republic) mode of government during the late Iron Age, Matsya maintained a monarchical system.

Matsya was eventually conquered by the empire of Magadha.

== Legacy ==
After the Indian independence in 1947, the princely states of Bharatpur, Dholpur, Alwar and Karauli were temporarily put together from 1947 to 1949 as the ″United States of Matsya″, and later in March 1949 after these princely states signed the Instrument of Accession they were merged with the present state of Rajasthan.

The Matsya Festival is held in Alwar every year in the last week of November to celebrate culture and adventure.

== See also ==
- Vedic period
- Janapadas
- Mahajanapadas
- Cemetery H culture
- Painted Grey Ware culture
- Northern Black Polished Ware
- Kingdoms of Ancient India

== Sources ==
- Raychaudhuri, Hemchandra (1953). Political History of Ancient India: From the Accession of Parikshit to the Extinction of Gupta Dynasty. University of Calcutta.
