= Ahichchhatra =

Ancient capital of Northern Panchala

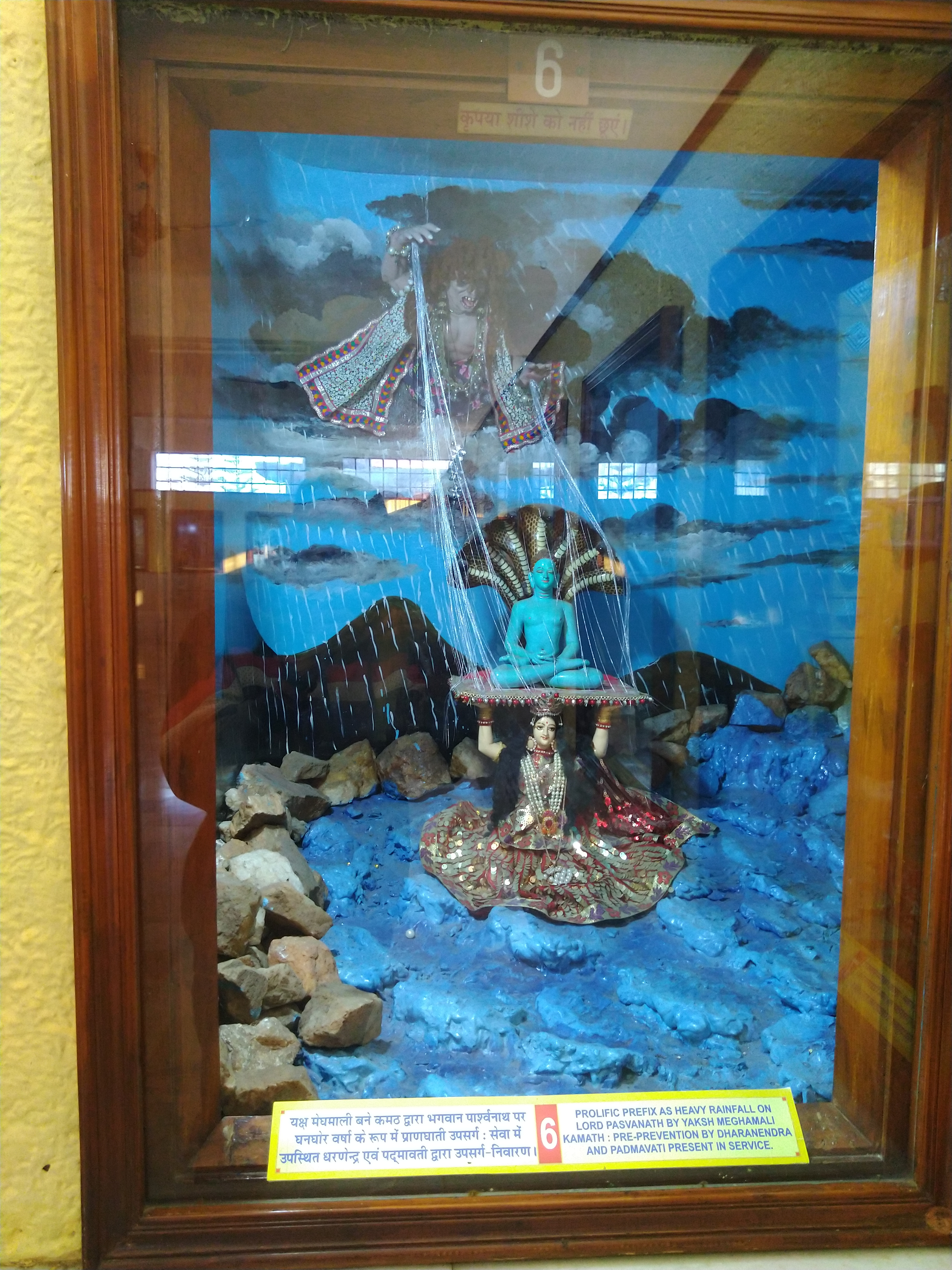
- A diorama in Jain Museum of Madhuban, Giridih depicting the event at Ahichchhatra

- Location within South Asia Location within Uttar Pradesh
- 28.371°N 79.136°E
- Type: Temples
- Cultures: Ochre Coloured Pottery culture, Black and red ware, Painted Grey Ware culture, Gupta Empire
- Location: Uttar Pradesh, India

History
- Built: c. 1500 BCE

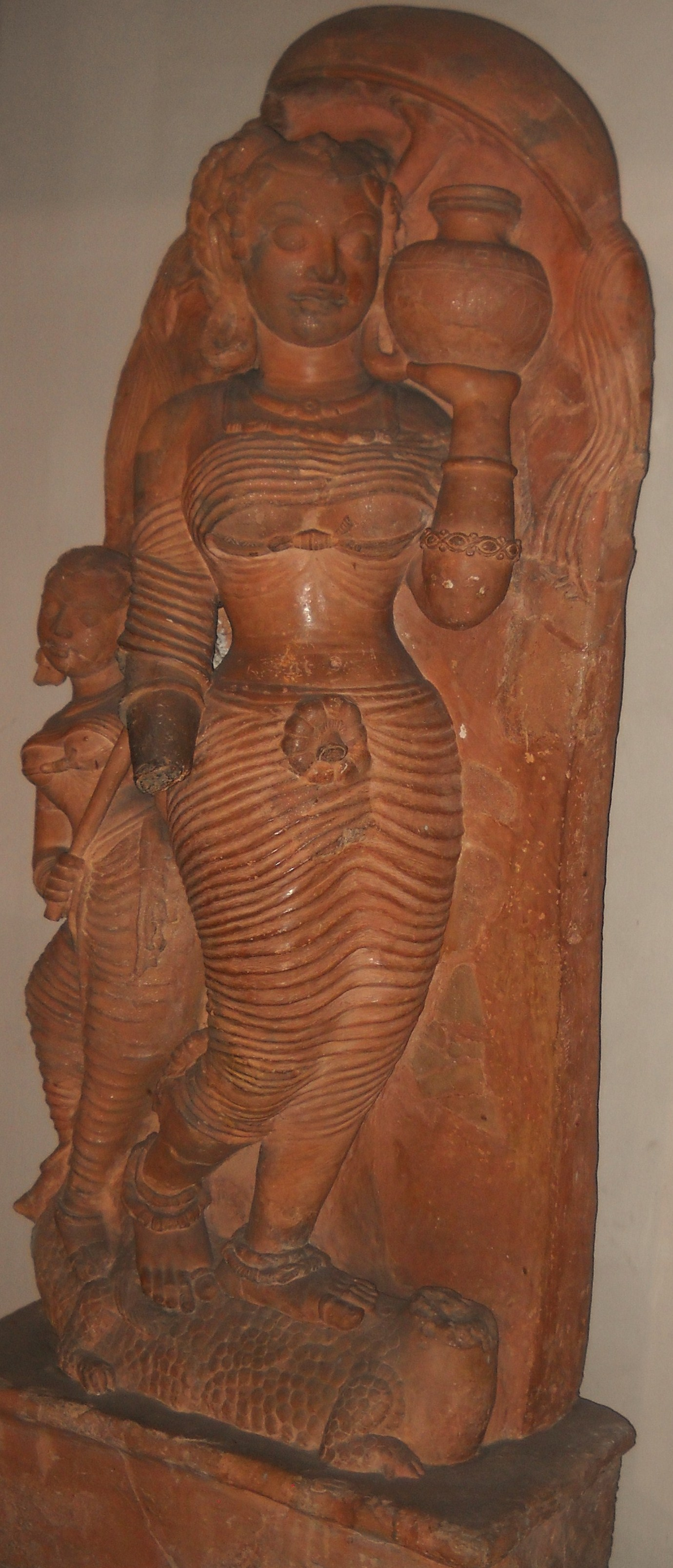
Gupta terracotta of the personified Ganges, 5th-6th century CE, National Museum, New Delhi.

Ahichchhatra or Ahikhet (Sanskrit: अहिच्छत्र, IAST: Ahicchatra) or Ahikshetra (Sanskrit: अहिक्षेत्र, IAST: Ahikṣetra), near the modern Ramnagar village in Aonla tehsil, Bareilly district in Uttar Pradesh, India, was the ancient capital of Northern Panchala, a northern Indian kingdom mentioned in the Mahabharata.

Most of the city was half a mile north-east of the modern village, with a large mound, popularly called the fort, two miles west of this. Several significant finds of sculpture, in both stone and (especially) terracotta of the early centuries CE, have been made at the site and are now in various museums. Excavations have uncovered nine strata, the lowest from before the 3rd century BCE and the latest from the 11th century CE.

The city appears to have reached its height during the period of the Gupta Empire. The region lacks sources of good stone and was a centre for making Indian pottery at various periods, and in the early CE the temples were decorated with unusually large terracotta relief panels and sculptures, many of very high quality.

== Names ==
The word Ahi means snake or Naga in Sanskrit. Nagas were a group of ancient people who worshiped serpents. The word khsetra means region in Sanskrit. This implies that Ahi-kshetra was a region of Nagas.

Vividha Tirtha Kalpa, composed by Jain Acharya Jinaprabha Suri in the 14th century CE, mentions Samkhyāvatǐ as the earlier name of Ahichchhatra and describes two Jain temples dedicated to Parshvanatha in the area. Ahikshetra is mentioned as Shankavai Samkhyavati in Vividhatirthakalpa.

== History ==
According to Jain Tradition, the history of Ahichchhatra traditionally starts from the period of 1st Tirthankara Rishabhanatha. It was visited by all 24 Tirthankaras. Ahichchhatra is believed to be the place where Parshvanatha, the 23rd Tirthankar of Jainism, attained Kevala Jnana (omniscience).

Ahichchhatra was one of the sixteen Mahajanapadas. Several ancient Jain āyāgapaṭa were excavated from this site, including the famous Nāṃdighoṣa āyāgapaṭa dated early c. 15 CE. 27 Jain inscriptions discovered here bear dates prior to 100 CE.

Alois Anton Führer excavated a Jain temple constructed during the reign of Indo-Scythians dynasty, enhrining idols from 96—152 CE. A number of Jain temples were discovered by Alexander Cunningham during excavation. Many idols, stupas and pillars from the Kushan and Gupta periods have been discovered in Ahichchhatra.

Vividha Tirtha Kalpa, composed by Śvetāmbara Acharya Jinaprabha Suri in the 14th century CE, mentions Samkhyāvatǐ as the earlier name of Ahichchhatra and describes two Jain temples dedicated to Parshvanatha in the area. According to Ahicchatra-nagri-kalpa, this place was visited by Goddess Ambika. Kaivalyamala, written by Śvetāmbara Jain acharya Udyotansuri in c. 778 CE, mentions that Harigupta of the Gupta Empire took diksha here.

Its history reaches back to late Vedic times, at which time it was capital of the Panchala kingdom. The name is written Ahikshetras as well as Ahi-chhatra, but the local legend of Adi Raja a Naga Descendent, who formed a Naga canopy over his head, when asleep, shows that the later is his correct form. The fort is said to have been built by the Adi Raja, a Nāga Descendent from Vasuki whose future elevation sovereignty was foretold by Drona, when he found him sleeping under the guardianship of a serpent with expended hood. The fort is also called Adikot.

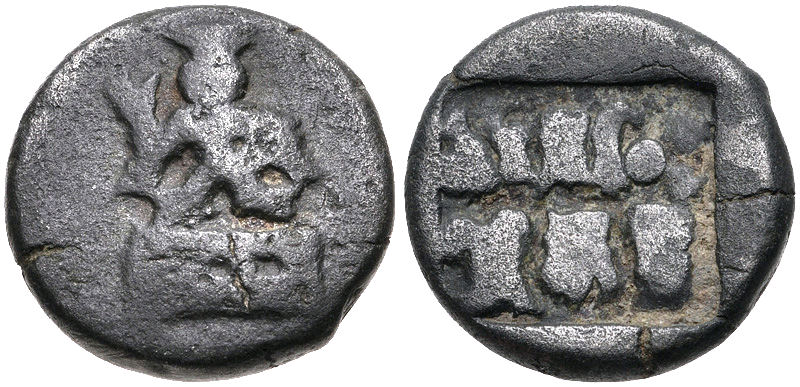
Coin of the Panchalas of Ahichhatra (75-50 BCE) Obv. Indra seated facing on pedestal, holding bifurcated object. Rev. Idramitrasa in Brahmi, Panchala symbols.

The last independent ruler of Ahichatra was Achyuta Naga, who was defeated by Samudragupta, after which Panchala was annexed into the Gupta Empire. The coins of Achyuta found from Ahichatra have a wheel of eight spokes on the reverse and the legend Achyu on the obverse.

== Archaeology ==
The site was briefly explored by Sir Alexander Cunningham in 1871, and then excavated by the ASI from 1940 for "about five years". The excavations found brick fortifications and continuity of occupation from a period before 600 BCE to 1100 CE. During the first excavations in 1940–44, the Painted Gray Ware pottery were found at the earliest level. Ruins of this city could be identified from the remote sensing imagery of IRS (Indian Remote Sensing) satellites. The ruins reveal that the city had a triangular shape. Recent excavations in Ahichchhatra showed it was first inhabited by the middle of the second millennium BC with Ochre Coloured Pottery culture people, followed by Black and Red Ware culture. Around 1000 BC, it reached at least 40 hectares of area, making it one of the largest Painted Grey Ware culture sites. Evidence of construction of early fortifications were discovered around 1000 BC indicating first urban development. Near Ahichchhatra, 2 km to its west there is a big pond which is said to trace its ancestry to the time of Mahabharata. The pond, located in the village of Jagannathpur is said to have been made by the pandavas at the time of their forest dwelling (vanvas).

In the early Gupta period a section of the city set aside for pottery contained very large firing pits, some 10 or 12 feet deep.

== Jain tradition ==
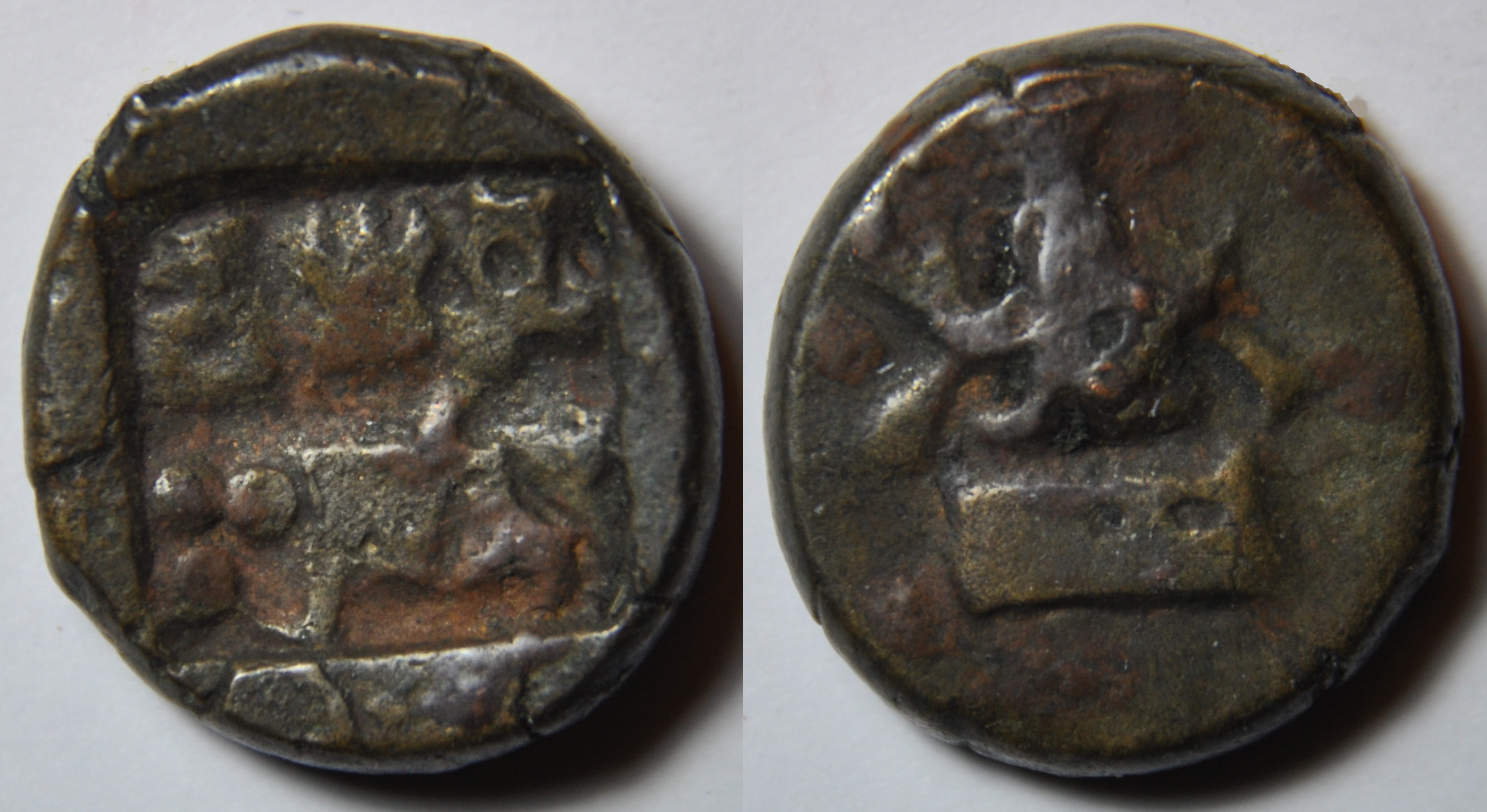
A bronze currency of ½ karshapana of King Indramitra (ca 75-50 BC?) Of Ahichatra of Panchala. Obv.: Inside a rectangle, a line of 3 symbols, under the name of the king. Rev.: Indra standing on a pedestal without pillars. Dimensions: 15 mm. Weight: 4.18 g.

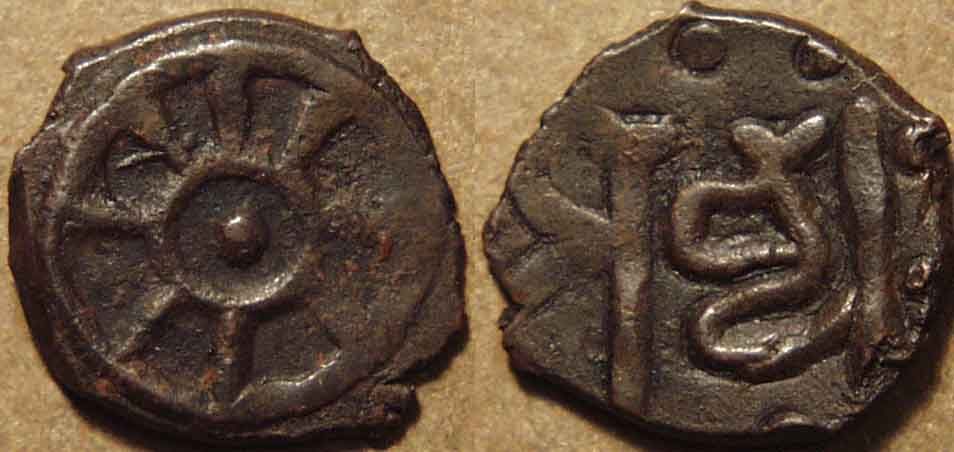
Coin of Achyuta, the last Panchala king, showing an 8-spoked wheel and the king's name: Achyu

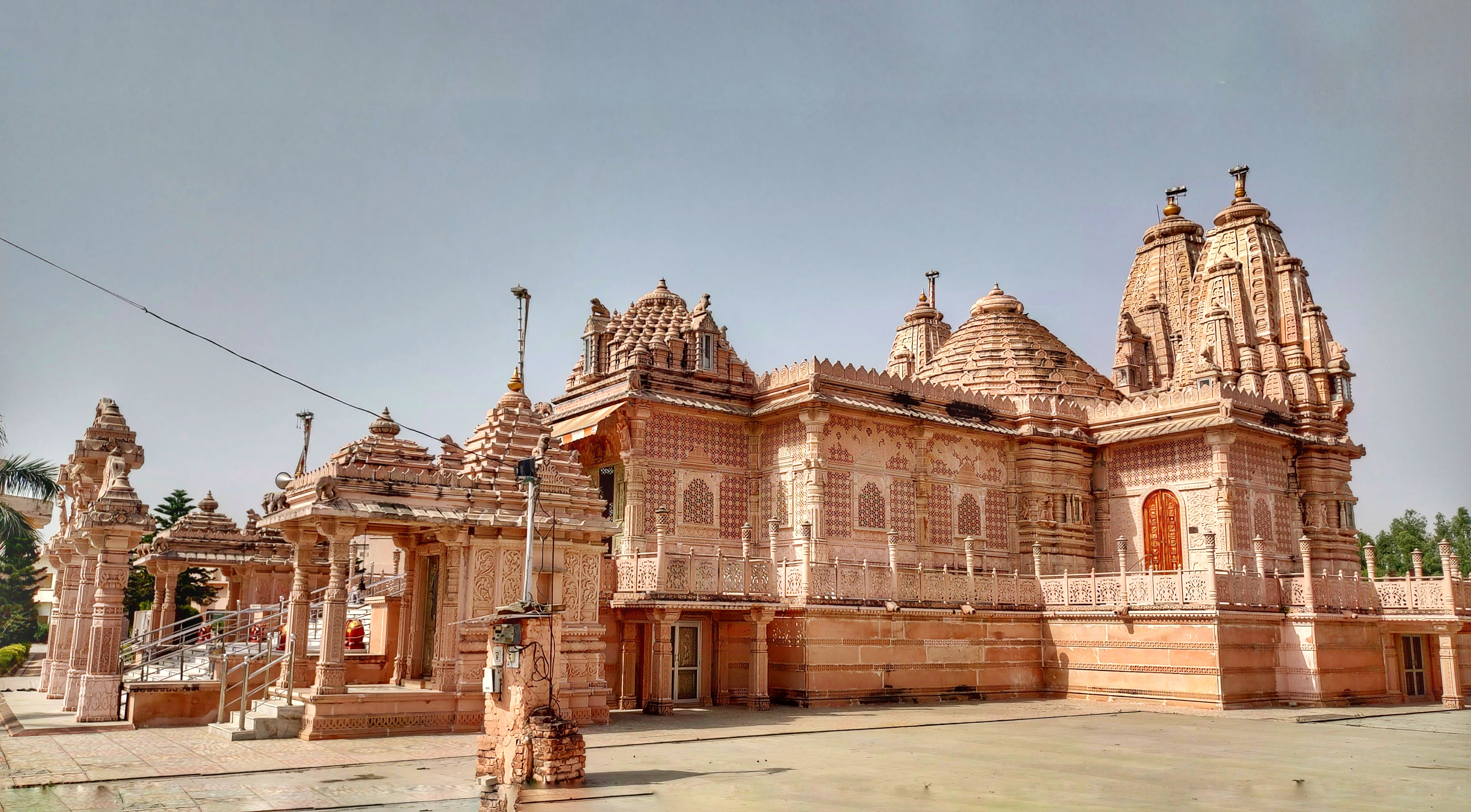
Ahichchhatra Jain temple

Ahichchhatra is believed to be the place where Parshvanatha, the 23rd Tirthankar of Jainism, attained Kevala Jnana (omniscience). The temples in Ahichchhatra are built to commemorate Parshvanatha attaining Kēvalajñāna kalyāṇaka. This temple is dedicated to Parshvanatha and is major Jain pilgrimage center. According to Uttar Pradesh Tourism, Ahichhatra Jain Temple witnessed over 4 lakh visitors in 2017. Ahichhatra Jain Mela is the primary festival of this temple and is organized annually in March.

According to Vividha Tirtha Kalpa, Kamath in an attempt to obstruct Parshvanatha from achieving Kevala Jnana caused continuous rain. Parshvanatha was immersed in water up to his neck and to protect him the serpent god Dharanendra held a canopy of thousand hoods over his head and the goddess Padmavati coiled herself around his body. Ahichchhatra Jain temples are built to commemorate Parshvanatha attaining Kēvalajñāna kalyāṇaka.

== Means of approach ==
From the Revati Bahoda Khera Station on Chandosi – Bareilly Line, vehicle of Kshetra and other vehicles are available.

- Buses are available from Delhi, Meerut, Aligarh, Lucknow, Kasganj & Badaun.
- Trains are available from Delhi, Bareilly, Agra, Moradabad, Aligarh to Revati Bahoda Khera Station. Vehicles are always available for Ramnagar from Revati Bahoda Khera Station.
- Airport: Delhi 250 km

== Nearby places ==
- Nainital – 180 km
- Hastinapur Atishaya Kshetra – 200 km
- Kampilji Atishaya Kshetra – 180 km
- Manglayatan (Aligarh) – 180 km
- Bareilly – 55 km

== Sculpture from Ahichchhatra ==
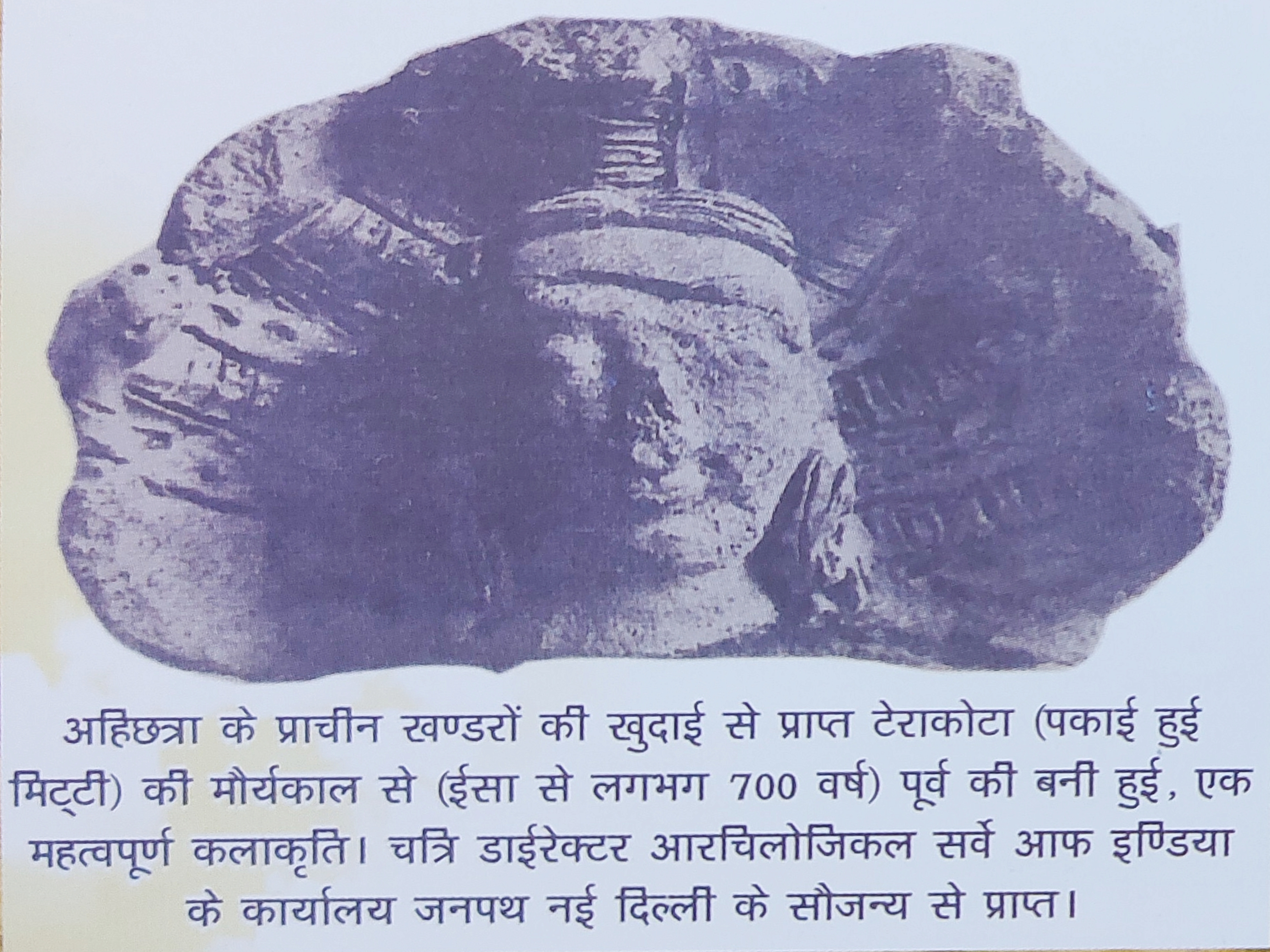
23rd Tirthankara Parshvanatha sculpture excavated from Ahichchhatra, 7th century BCE

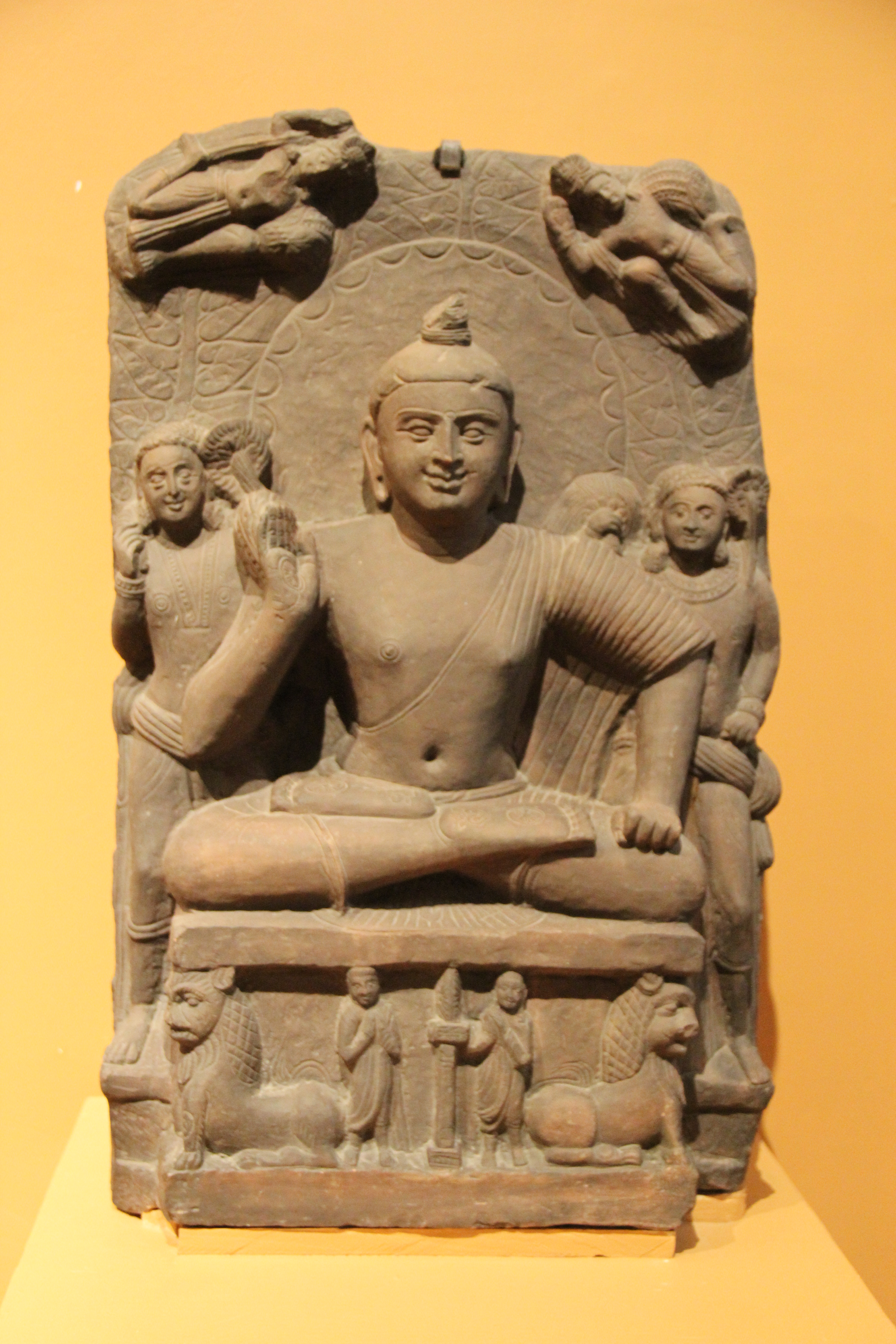
Stone Buddha, c. 1st Century CE, Kushan Period

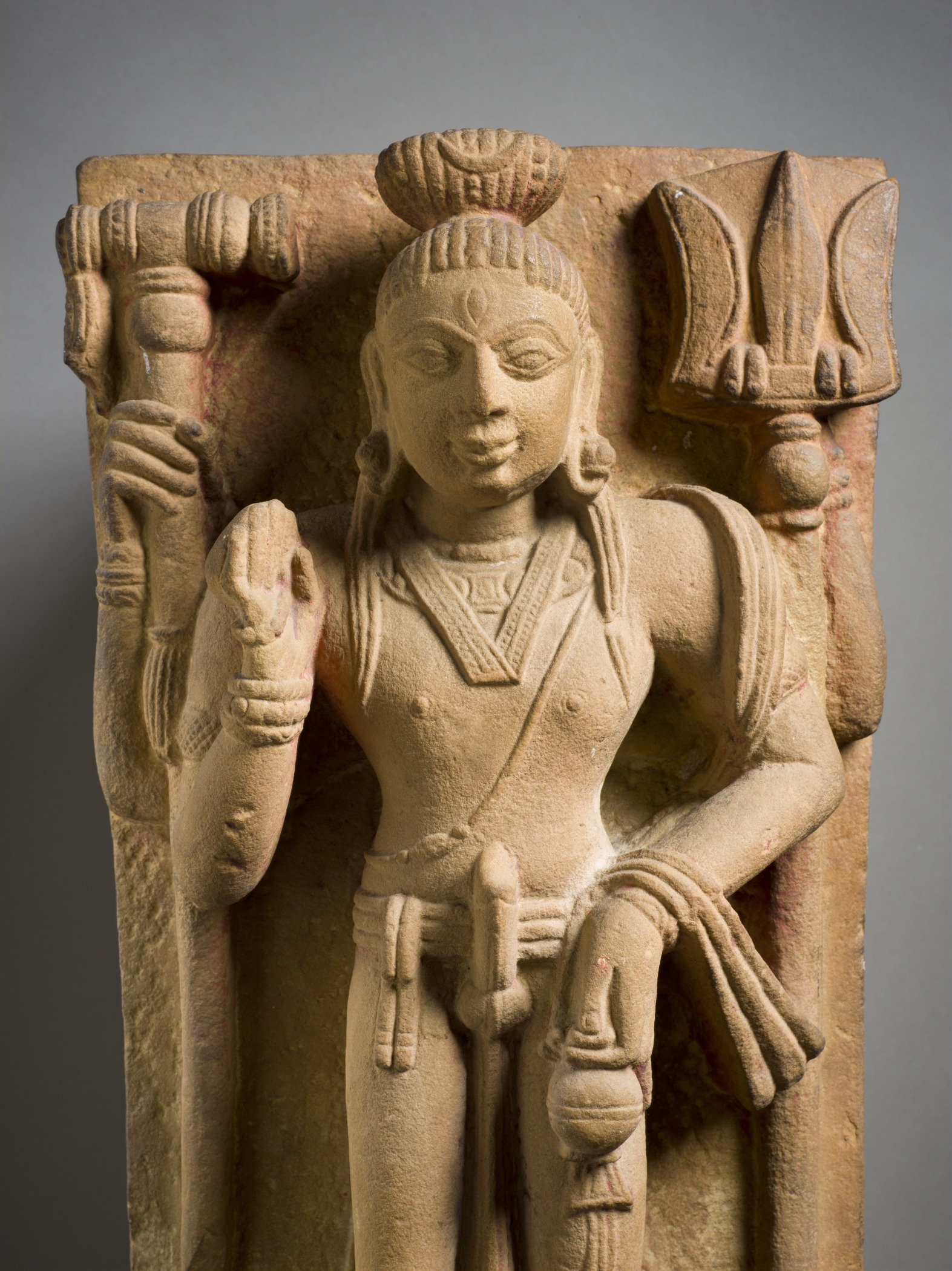
Sandstone Shiva, 3rd century

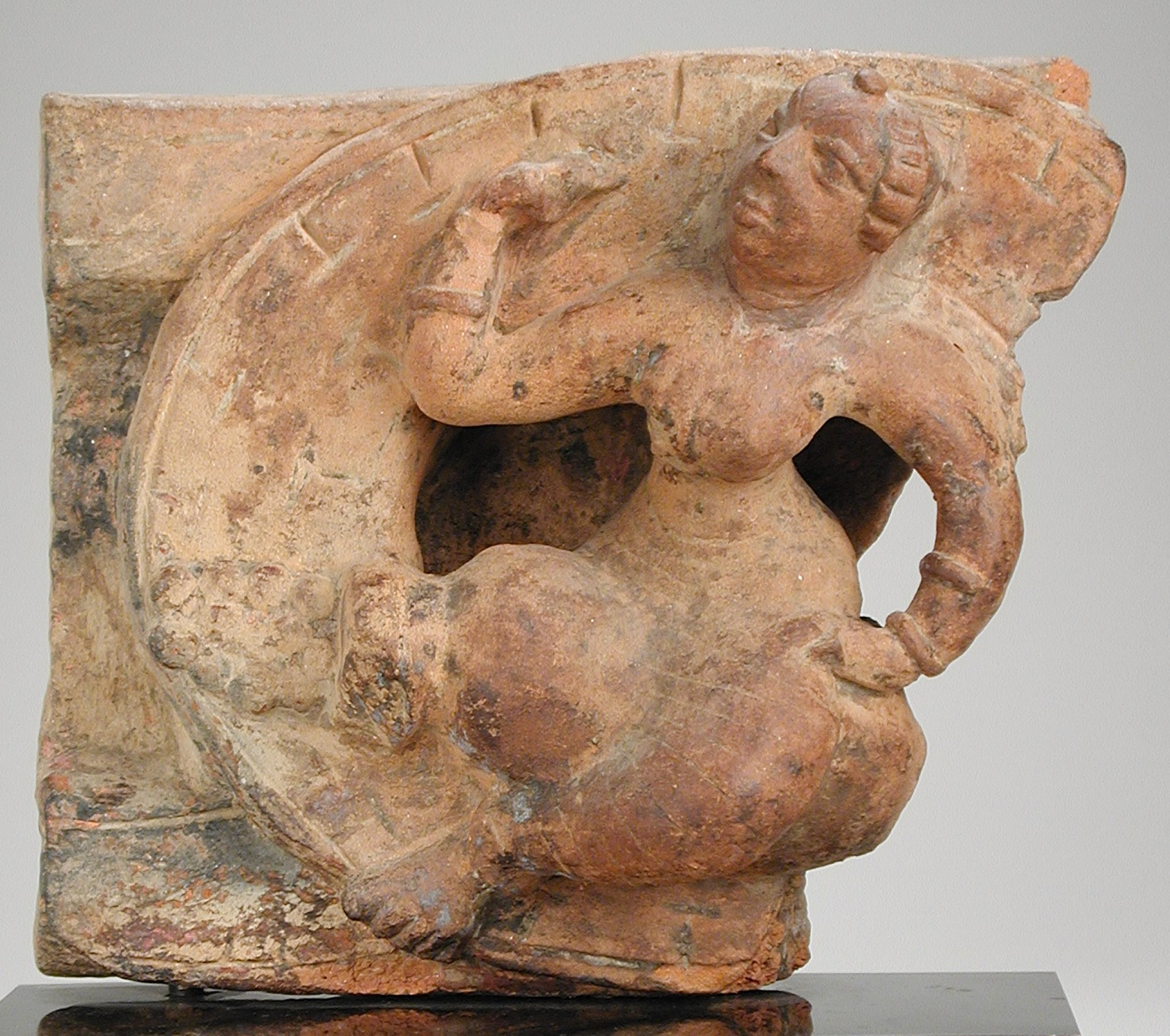
Terracotta architectural panel with Goddess, Gupta period, 5th century

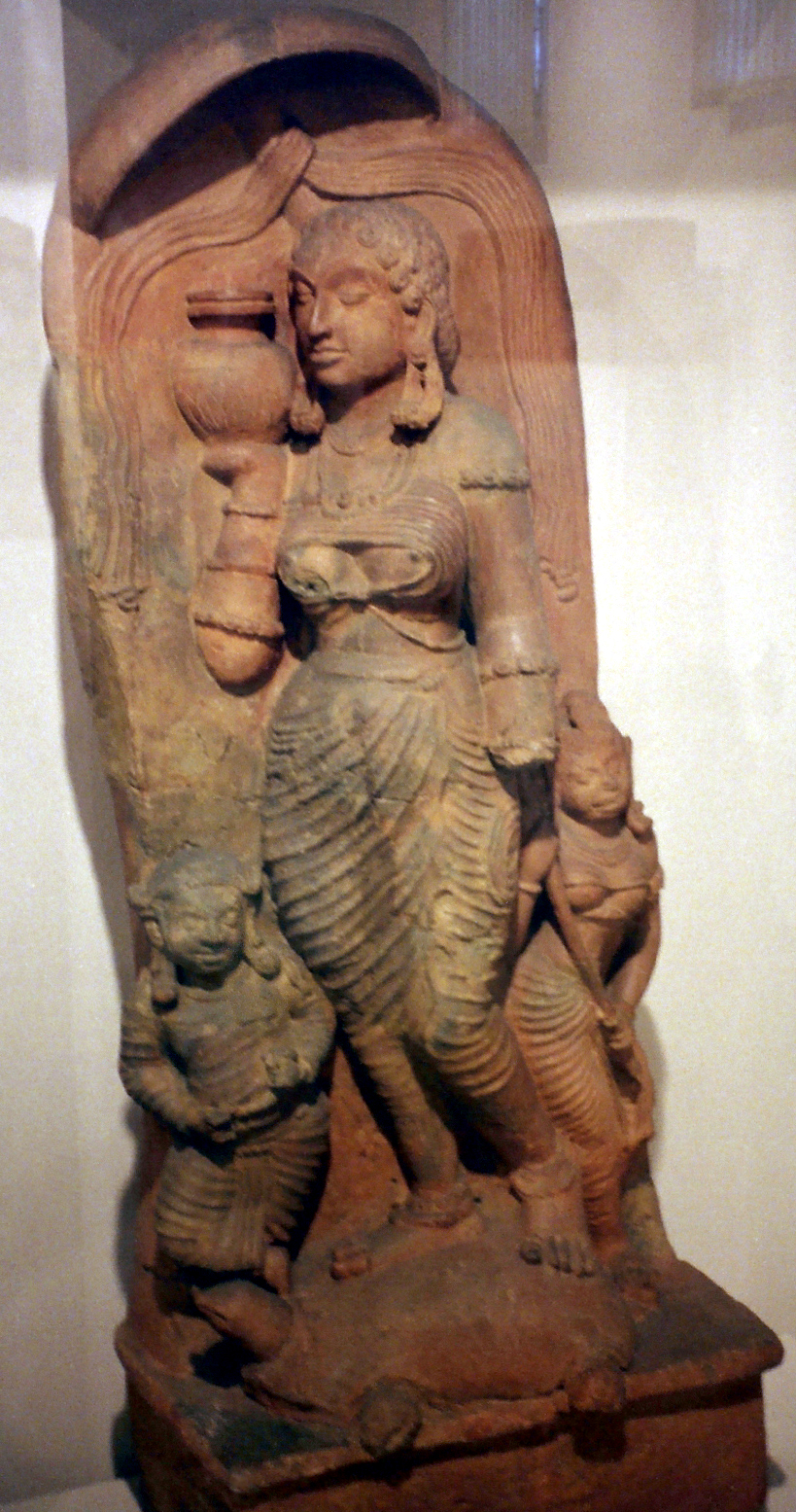
Gupta period terracotta Yamuna, pair to the Ganga above
