= Jognakhera =

- Archeological site
- Location within Haryana Location within India
- Coordinates: 29°58′17″N 76°53′14″E
- Country: India
- Province: Haryana
- Time zone: UTC+5.30 (Indian Standard Time)

Jognakhera is an archaeological site belonging to late Harappan phase of Indus Valley Civilisation. Jogankhera is located in Kurukshetra District, Haryana, India.

== Period ==
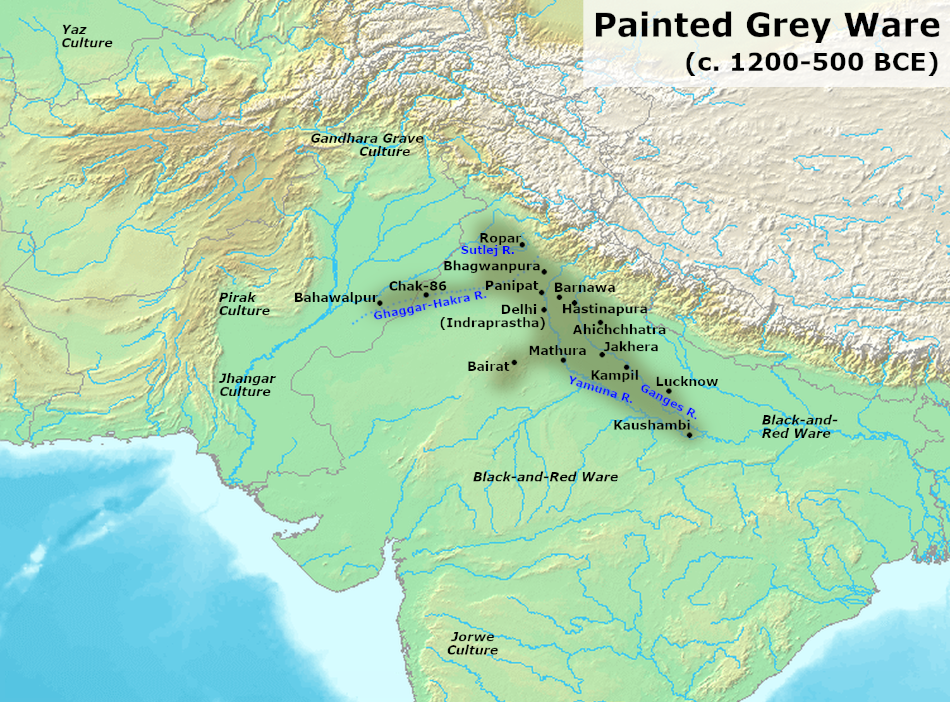
Painted Grey Ware Culture (1200-600 BCE).

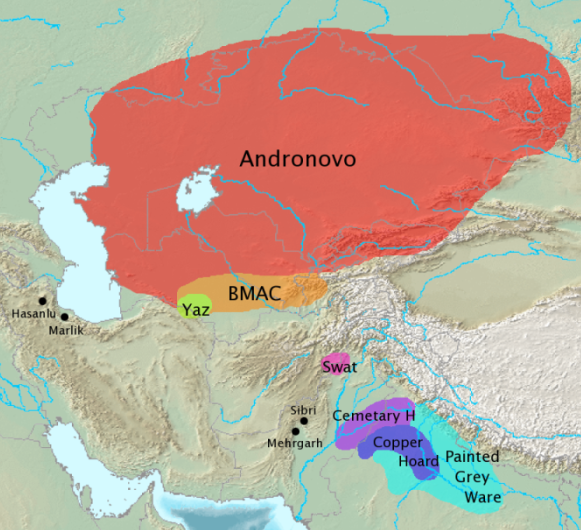
Archaeological cultures associated with Indo-Iranian migrations (after EIEC). The Andronovo, BMAC and Yaz cultures have often been associated with Indo-Iranian migrations. The GGC (Swat), Cemetery H, Copper Hoard and PGW cultures are candidates for cultures associated with Indo-Aryan migrations.

The find from this site belong to the mature Harappan phase as well as later-era PGW phase (Vedic period). The Painted Grey Ware culture (PGW) probably corresponds to the middle and late Vedic period, i.e., the Kuru-Panchala kingdom, the first large state in South Asia after the decline of the Indus Valley civilization (IVC). Painted Grey Ware culture (PGW) chiefdoms in the region were succeeded by Northern Black Polished Ware (NBPW) from c. 700-500 BCE, associated with the rise of the great mahajanapada states (mahajanapada states Kuru, Panchala, Matsya, Surasena and Vatsa) and later of the Magadha Empire. Towards the end of the late Vedic period, many of the PGW settlements grew into the large towns and cities of the Northern Black Polished Ware (NBPW) period. B. B. Lal confirms that Mahabharata is associated with PGW sites and gives a date to c. 900 BCE for the War recounted in the Mahabharata.

Saraswati valley has the earlier phase of the PGW culture, such as excavation at Hat (Hathira) in Kurukshetra. Hathira was protected by a V-shaped moat. Similar moats were found Jognakhera and Kunal on the Saraswati river. The presence of moat shows these were chiefdom-based cultures. These cultures reach a peak in Ganga-Yamuna Doab before the rise of Mahajanapadas in the Northern Black Polished Ware period.

== Excavation ==
Jognakhera was excavated during 2009, although local people are not aware of the importance of this ancient site. Pot shreds were also recovered from this site.

== Copper smelting ==
Jognakhera was a copper smelting site where copper smelting furnaces with copper slag were recovered. The furnaces excavated from this site looked like huge saucers.

== Damage to site ==
Floods created out of breach to Sutlej Yamuna link canal during July 2010 caused damage to this archeological site.

== See also ==
- Indus Valley Civilization
- List of Indus Valley Civilization sites
- List of inventions and discoveries of the Indus Valley Civilization
- Hydraulic engineering of the Indus Valley Civilization
- Kunal, Haryana (copper smelting)
