= Bhagwanpura, Haryana =

Archaeological site in India

Bhagwanpura
- Location within Haryana Location within India
- 30°04′N 76°57′E
- Cultures: Cemetery H culture, Painted Grey Ware culture
- Location: Haryana, India
- Region: Thanesar, Kurukshetra district, Haryana

Bhagwanpura, also known as Baghpur, is a village in Kurukshetra district, Haryana, India, situated 24 kilometres (15 mi) northeast of Kurukshetra. It is associated with an archaeological site that lies on the bank of Hakra Ghaggar channel.

The archaeological site is notable for showing an overlap between the late Harappan and Painted Grey Ware cultures. Painted Grey Ware is generally associated with the Vedic people, so this area can be said to represent the junction of two major civilizations of India.

== Overview ==
Bhagwanpura shows one period of habitation, with two sub-periods:

- Sub-period IA: late Harappan culture (c. 1700–1300 BCE)
- Sub-period IB: overlap between late Harappan and Painted Grey Ware (PGW) culture (c. 1400–1000 BCE)

During sub-period IA, the late Harappan people lived in houses of burnt brick and built mud platforms to protect against flooding. During sub-period IB, the late Harappan pottery continued, but a new form of pottery (the PGW) was introduced. Initially, the PGW people lived in thatched wattle-and-daub huts, but later they began to build mud-walled houses. One large house had thirteen rooms and a courtyard, and may have belonged to a chief. Towards the end of sub-period IB, the PGW people began to use burnt bricks, but no complete structures have been found. During both phases, cattle, sheep, and pig were domesticated, but horse bones have only been found in sub-period IB. Six oval structures from this sub-period may have had some ritualistic use.

Some scholars believe that the burnt bricks (square, rectangular, and wedge-shaped) from sub-period IB were not in fact used for building houses, but for the construction of Vedic fire altars.

== Museum ==
An archaeological museum at Sheikh Chilli's Tomb complex in Kurukshetra established by the Archaeological Survey of India includes in its collection archaeological finds such as a humped bull-shaped carnelian pendant, terracotta beads and semi-precious stones from sites in Bhagwanpura.

== See also ==
- Indus Valley Civilisation
- Painted Grey Ware culture
- Vedic period
- Kuru kingdom
