= Dalabhya =

Sage in Hinduism

Dalabhya is a sage mentioned in the Chandogya Upanishad. His lineage is the Dalabhya gotra. The Chandogya Upanishad describes a conversation between sages Shilaka, Dalabhya, and Pravahana. The sage is also mentioned in the Bhavisya-uttara Purana where the sage Pulastya narrates him the story of Krishna taking the form of a mendicant.
