= Salva (India) =

Tribe in ancient India

The Salva or Salvi tribe is mentioned in Late Vedic texts (such as the Jaiminiya Brahmana) is a tribe that invaded Kurukshetra and defeated the Kuru kingdom, probably c. 900 BCE. The prior history of the Salva tribe is obscure, although they appear to have been associated with the Trigarta kingdom and the Punjab region. After invading the Kuru kingdom, the Salvas settled along the Yamuna river and the Alwar region of Rajasthan (near the Matsya kingdom), and by the end of the Vedic period they had eventually adopted Vedic culture as they coalesced with the remaining Kurus and the Surasena mahajanapada. A passage in the Karna Parva of the Mahabharata praises the Salvas for following the "eternal law of righteousness" but also says that they "need full instruction," unlike the more perceptive Kurus and Panchalas who can "gather the sense from half-expressed words".

== See also ==
- Keśin Dālbhya
