= Keśin Dālbhya =

Ruler of Panchala Kingdom

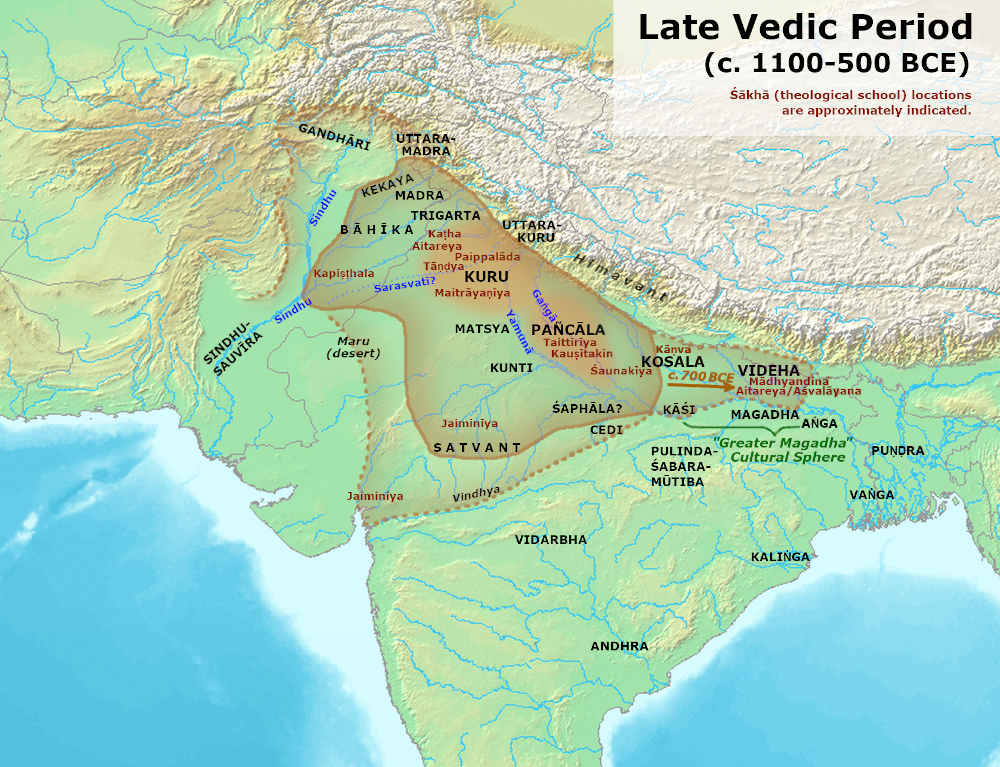
Panchala and other kingdoms of the Late Vedic period

Keśin Dālbhya (or Dārbhya) was a king of Panchala during the Late Vedic period, most likely between c. 900 and 750 BCE.

== Historical Mentions ==
He is mentioned prominently in the Taittiriya and Jaiminiya Brahmanas. His maternal uncle was a Kuru king, reflecting the matrimonial alliance between the two kingdoms.

His reign saw the establishment of the Panchala kingdom as the dominant political and cultural center of northern India, in the aftermath of the decline and defeat of the Kuru Kingdom by the non-Vedic Salva tribe.

The nephew of the Kuru king Ucchaisravas, son of Kuvaya, who had died heirless, he subsequently took over the leadership and ensured the continuation of the Vedic tradition.

His dynasty remained in power for many generations; one of his later successors was the philosopher-king Pravahana Jaivali mentioned in the Upanishads.

== See also ==
- Parikshit
- Janaka
