= Panchala =

Ancient Hindu kingdom of India

Panchala Pañcāla
- c. 1100 BCE – c. 340 CE
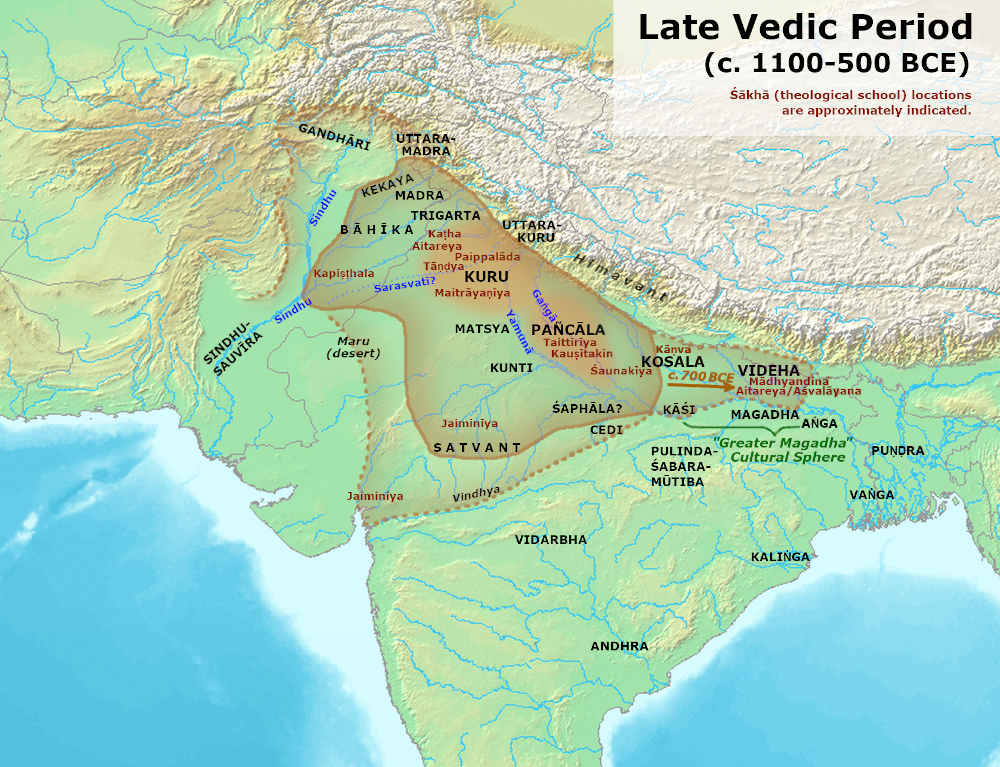
- Panchala and other kingdoms in the Late Vedic period.

- Panchala and other Mahajanapadas in the Post Vedic period.
- Capital: Ahichatra (northern), Kampila
- Common languages: Vedic Sanskrit
- Religion: Historical Vedic religion Jainism; Buddhism
- Government: Monarchy
- Raja
  - c. 850 BCE: Keśin Dālbhya
  - c. 750 BCE: Pravahana Jaivali
  - c. 400 CE: Achyuta
- Historical era: Iron Age
  - Established: c. 1100 BCE (in Late Vedic period)
  - Disestablished: c. 400 CE (in Gupta Empire)
Preceded by	Succeeded by
Rigvedic tribes; Magadha	Magadha; Gupta Empire
- Today part of: India

Panchala (IAST: Pañcāla, Sanskrit: पांचाल) was an ancient kingdom of northern India, located in the Ganges-Yamuna Doab of the upper gangetic plain, which is identified as Kanyakubja or region around Kannauj. During the late Vedic period (c. 1100–500 BCE), it was one of the most powerful states of ancient India, closely allied with the Kuru kingdom. By the c. 5th century BCE, it had become an oligarchic confederacy, considered one of the sixteen mahajanapadas (major states) of the Indian subcontinent. After being absorbed into the Mauryan Empire (322–185 BCE), Panchala regained its independence until it was annexed by the Gupta Empire in the 4th century CE.

== Location ==
The Pañcāla state was located to the west of the Gomti River, and the north of the Chambal River. Its western neighbours were the Sūrasenas and the Yakṛllomas, while in the north-west it was separated from the Ganga and the Kurus by dense forests. The northern boundaries of Pañcāla were the forests around the region of the Gaṅgā's source. The territory of Pañcāla corresponded to the modern-day areas of Rohilkhand such as Pilibhit, Bareilly, Budaun, Shahjahanpur, Farrukhabad, Kannauj and Kanpur, and parts of Awadh such as the western half of Hardoi, and parts of Lakhimpur as well as the Central Gaṅgā-Yamunā Doab in Uttar Pradesh.

== Mahabharata ==
Drupada, the king of Panchala, was the father of Draupadi, who married the Pandavas. To avenge her humiliation during the game of dice played at Hastinapur, which led to their lengthy exile, he fought on the side of the Pandavas in the Kurukshetra War. Bhishma ranked him a Maharathi, his son Dhrishtadyumna an Atirathi and his other son, Shikhandi, a Rathi. He contributed three (of the seven) Akshauhini armies to the Pandavas during the war.

== Vedic period ==
The Panchala janapada is believed to have been formed by multiple janas (tribes). The Shatapatha Brahmana suggests that Panchala was the later name of the Krivi tribe (who, according to the Rigveda, lived on the bank of the Indus River). The later Vedic literature uses the term Panchala to describe the close associates of the Kurus. Panchala is identified with the city of Kanyakubja or the region around it. The Mahabharata mentions the 'Saranjayas' as a tribe or a family among the Panchalas, occasionally using the terms interchangeably, but also separately at a few places. The Mahabharata further mentions that the Panchala country had its capital at Kanyakubja or modern day Kannauj but was later divided into two territories: the northern Panchala with its capital at Ahichchhatra, and the southern Panchala with its capital at Kampilya.

According to the political scientist Sudama Misra, the name of the Panchala janapada suggests that it was a fusion of five (pancha) janas (tribes). H.C. Raychaudhuri theorised that these five clans were the Krivis, the Turvashas, the Keshins, the Srinjayas, and the Somakas. Each of these clans is known to be associated with one or more princes mentioned in the Vedic texts – the Krivis with Kraivya Panchala, the Turvashas with Sona Satrasaha, the Keshins with Keshin Dalbhya, the Srinjayas with Sahadeva Sarnjaya, and the Somakas with Somaka Sahadevya. The names of the last two clans, the Somakas and the Srinjayas, are also mentioned in the Mahabharata and the Puranas.

King Drupada, whose daughter Draupadi was married into the Pandavas in the Mahabharata, belonged to the Somaka clan. However, the Mahabharata and the Puranas consider the ruling clan of the northern Panchala as an offshoot of the Bharata clan, identifying Divodasa, Sudas, Srinjaya, Somaka, and Drupada (also called Yajnasena) as its most notable rulers. It is also mentioned that Sutasoma, the son of Draupadi and the Pandava prince Bhima, was the king of the Somaka tribe during the Kurukshetra War.

The Panchala Kingdom rose to its highest prominence in the aftermath of the decline of the Kuru Kingdom, culminating in its eventual defeat by the non-Vedic Salva tribe. The king of Panchala, Keśin Dālbhya (approximately between 900 and 750 BCE), was the nephew of the Kuru king, who had died heirless; Keśin subsequently took over the leadership, establishing his kingdom as the new political and cultural center, and ensuring the continuation of the Vedic tradition. His dynasty remained in power for many generations; one of his later successors was the philosopher-king Pravahana Jaivali, who was the contemporary of King Janaka of Videha and the philosophers Uddalaka Aruni and Svetaketu (8th–7th centuries BCE).

== Under Magadha ==
Originally a monarchical clan, the Panchalas appear to have switched to a republican model of government around 500 BCE. The Buddhist text Anguttara Nikaya mentions Panchala as one of the sixteen mahajanapadas of the c. 6th century BCE. The 4th century BCE text Arthashastra also attests to the Panchalas as following the Rajashabdopajivin (king consul) constitution. Panchala was annexed into the Magadha empire during the reign of Mahapadma Nanda in the mid-4th century BCE.

== Post-Mauryan period ==
Numismatic evidence reveals the existence of independent rulers of Panchala during the post-Mauryan period. Most of the coins issued by them are found at Ahichatra and adjoining areas. All the coins are round, made of a copper alloy and have a set pattern on the obverse-a deeply incised square punch consisting of a row of three symbols and the ruler's name placed in a single line below them. The reverse bears depictions of the deities or sometimes of their attributes, whose names form a component of the issuers' names (for example, coins of Agnimitra bear the depiction of Agni). The names of the rulers found on these coins are Vangapala, Yajnapala, Damagupta, Rudragupta, Jayagupta, Suryamitra, Phalgunimitra, Bhanumitra, Bhumimitra, Dhruvamitra, Agnimitra, Indramitra, Vishnumitra, Jayamitra, Prajapatimitra, Varunamitra, Anamitra, Bhadraghosha and Yugasena (the reverse of the coins of Varunamitra, Yugasena and Anamitra do not exhibit any deity). Shaunakayaniputra Vangapala, ruler of Ahichatra, whom Vaidehiputra Ashadhasena mentioned as his grandfather in his Pabhosa inscription, is identified with king Vangapala, known from his coins. The name of Damagupta is also found on a clay sealing.

The last independent ruler of Ahichatra was Achyuta, who was defeated by Samudragupta, after which Panchala was annexed into the Gupta Empire. The coins of Achyuta found from Ahichatra have a wheel of eight spokes on the reverse and the legend Achyu on the obverse.

== Gallery ==
Panchala coinage

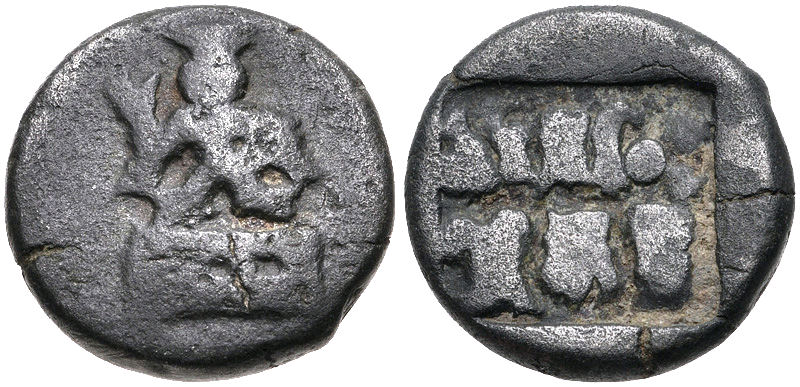
Coin of the Panchalas of Ahichhatra (75-50 BCE).
Obv Indra seated facing on pedestal, holding bifurcated object.
Rev Idramitrasa in Brahmi, Panchala symbols.

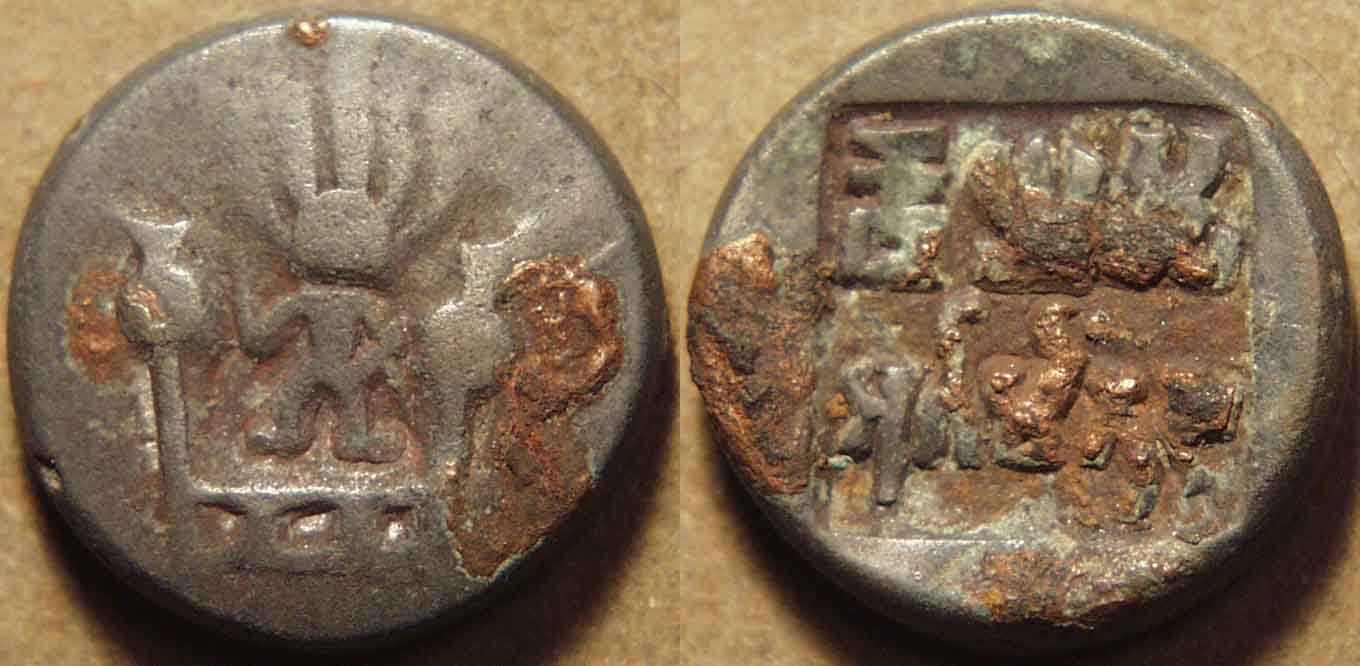
Coin of Agnimitra, showing the depiction of Agni with flaming hair on the obverse, and a reverse showing the three dynastic symbols of the Panchala rulers and a legend naming the king: Agimitasa.

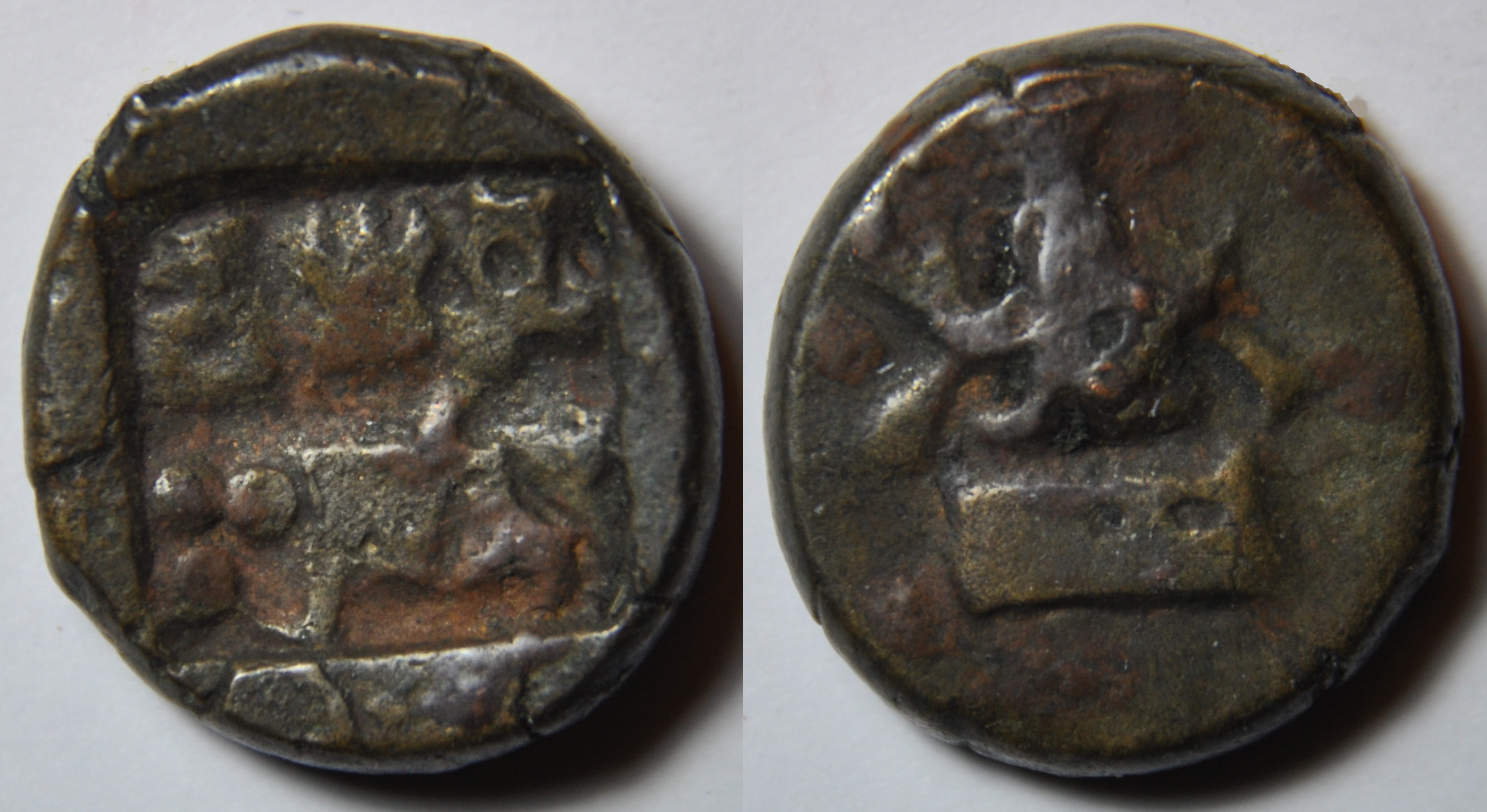
A bronze currency of 1/2 karshapana of King Indramitra (ca 75-50 BC?) Of Ahichatra of Panchala. Obv: A inside a rectangle, a line of 3 symbols, under the name of the king. Rev: Indra standing on a pedestal without pillars. Dimensions: 15 mm. Weight: 4.18 g.

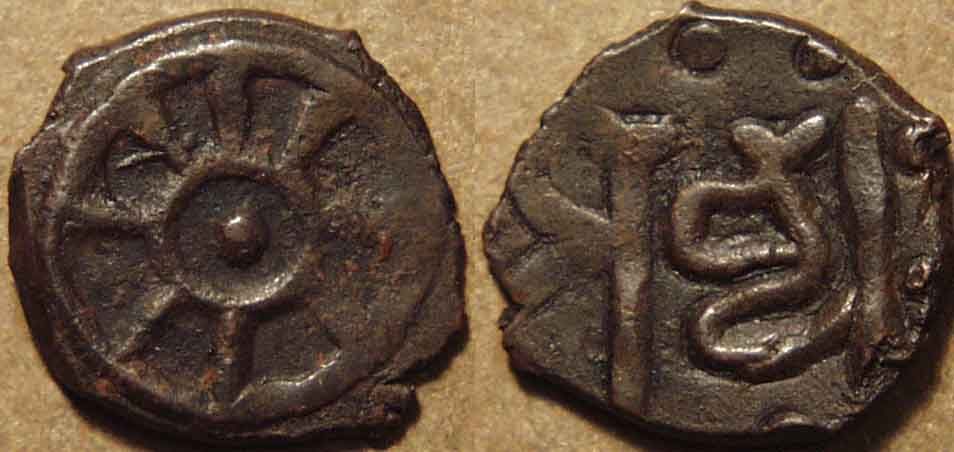
Coin of Achyuta, the last Panchala king, showing an 8-spoked wheel and the king's name: Achyu.

== Rulers ==
Ajamida II had a son named Rishin. Rishin had two sons namely Samvarana II whose son was Kuru and Brihadvasu whose descendants were Panchalas.

List of Panchala Kingdom rulers are-

- Rishin, (his sons were Brihadvasu and Samvarana II)
- Brihadbhanu, (son of Brihadvasu)
- Brihatkaya
- Puranjaya
- Riksha
- Bramhyaswa
- Aramyaswa
- Mudgala, Yavinara, Pratiswan, Kampilya (Founder of Kampilya – Capital of Panchala Kingdom) and Sranjaya were the sons of Aramyaswa and were the founders of Panchala Kingdom and were called as Panchalas.
- Dritimana, (son of Mudgala)
- Drdhanemi
- Sarvasena, (founder of Ujjain Kingdom)
- Mitra
- Rukmaratha
- Suparswa
- Sumathi
- Sannatimana
- Krta
- Pijavana
- Somadutta
- Jantuvahana
- Badhrayaswa
- Brihadhishu
- Brihadhanu
- Brihadkarma
- Jayaratha
- Visvajit
- Seinyajit
- Nepavirya, (after this King's name the country was named Nepaldesh)
- Samara
- Sadashva
- Ruchiraswa
- Pruthusena
- Prapti
- Prthaswa
- Sukrthi
- Vibhiraja
- Anuha
- Bramhadatta II
- Vishwaksena
- Dandasena
- Durmukha
- Durbuddhi
- Dharbhya
- Divodasa
- Sivana I
- Mitrayu
- Maitrayana
- Soma
- Sivana II
- Sadasana
- Sahadeva
- Somaka, (Somaka's eldest son was Sugandakrthu and youngest was Prishata. But in a war all sons died and Prishata Survived and became the king of Panchala)
- Prishati, (son of Somaka)
- Drupada, (son of Prishata)
- Dhrishtadyumna, (was the son of Drupada, Draupadi and Shikhandi were the daughters of Drupada)
- Keśin Dālbhya
- Pravahana Jaivali
- Achyuta, (last known ruler of Panchala Kingdom which was defeated in c. 350 CE by Gupta ruler Samudragupta.)

== See also ==
- Vedic period
- Mahabharata
- History of India
- History of Hinduism
- Indus Valley Civilisation
- Painted Grey Ware culture
- Janapadas & Mahajanapadas
- Historicity of the Mahabharata
- Kuru kingdom & Gandhara Kingdom

Preceded by	Panchala (850 BC–500 BC)	Succeeded by Nanda Dynasty
