= Achyuta of Panchala =

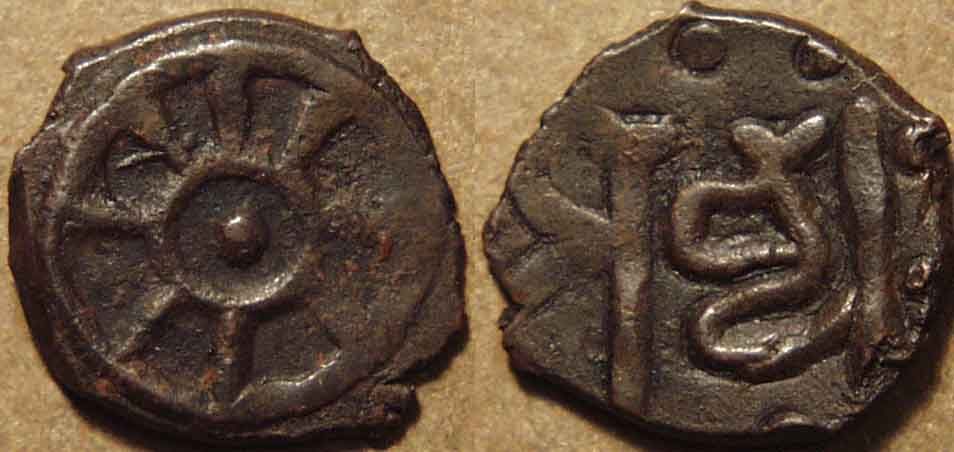
- Coin of Achyuta

King of Panchala
- Reign: c. 350 CE
- House: Nagas of Panchala

Achyuta Naga was the last independent ruler of Panchala, in what is now northern India. He was defeated by Samudragupta, a powerful Gupta emperor.

== Reign ==
Achyuta Naga was the last independent ruler of Panchala. He was defeated by the Gupta Emperor Samudragupta, after which Panchala was annexed into the Gupta Empire.

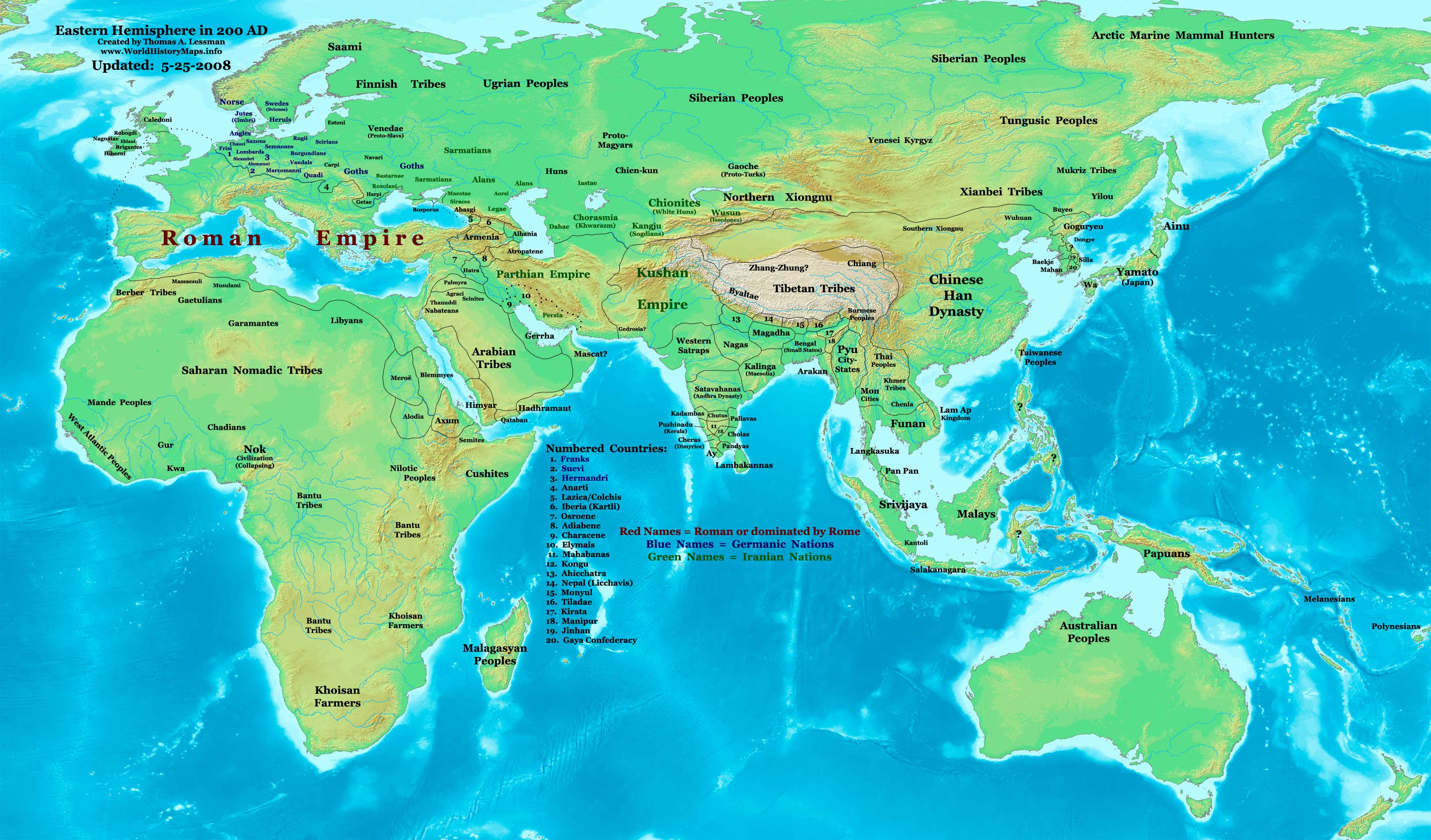
Panchala around the time of Achyuta

The coins of Achyuta found from Ahichatra have a wheel of eight spokes on the reverse and the legend Achyu on the obverse.

The early portion of the Prayag prashasti of Samudragupta mentions that Samudragupta "uprooted" three kings: Achyuta, Nagasena, and another ruler, whose name is lost in the damaged portion of the inscription. According to the inscription, Samudragupta reinstated these rulers after they sought his forgiveness.

It is not clear why these three kings' names are repeated later in the inscription. According to one theory, they were vassal rulers who rebelled against Samudragupta after the death of his father. Samudragupta crushed the rebellion and reinstated them after they sought his forgiveness. Later, these rulers rebelled once more, and Samudragupta defeated them again. Another possibility is that the author of the inscription thought it necessary to repeat these names while describing Samudragupta's later conquests in Aryavarta, simply because these kings belonged to that region.

== Sources ==
- Ashvini Agrawal (1989). Rise and Fall of the Imperial Guptas. Motilal Banarsidass. ISBN 978-81-208-0592-7.
- R. C. Majumdar (1981). A Comprehensive History of India. Vol. 3, Part I: A.D. 300-985. Indian History Congress / People's Publishing House. OCLC 34008529.
- Tej Ram Sharma (1978). Personal and Geographical Names in the Gupta Inscriptions. Concept. p. 258. OCLC 249004782.
- Tej Ram Sharma (1989). A Political History of the Imperial Guptas: From Gupta to Skandagupta. Concept. ISBN 978-81-7022-251-4.
