= Kuru kingdom =

Ancient Indo-Aryan Vedic union

Kingdom of Kuru
- c. 1200-900 BCE – c. 345 BCE
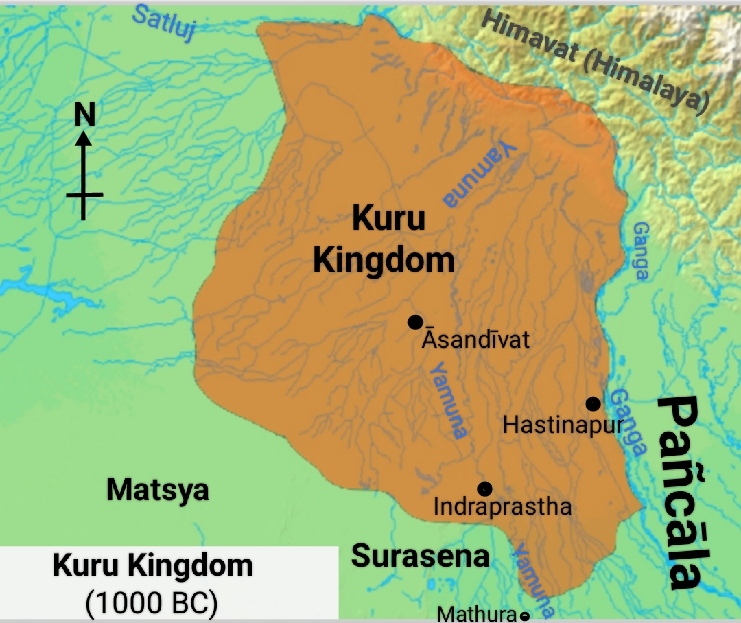
- Capital: Āsandīvat (modern Haryana), Hastinapura (modern Meerut division, Saharanpur division and Aligarh division); Indraprastha (modern Delhi and some part of National Capital Region (India))
- Common languages: Vedic Sanskrit
- Religion: Historical Vedic religion
- Government: Elective monarchy (1200 BCE - 700 BCE); Confederation (700 BCE - 500 BCE); Gaṇasaṅgha (500 BCE - 345 BCE)
- Raja (King)
  - c. 12th-9th centuries BCE: Parikshit
  - c. 12th-9th centuries BCE: Janamejaya
- Legislature: Sabhā
- Historical era: Iron Age
  - Established: c. 1200-900 BCE
  - Kuru Kingdom was divided into Kuru Confederation and Vatsa Kingdom: c. 700 BCE
  - Kuru Gaṇasaṅgha (Republic): c. 500 BCE
  - Disestablished: c. 345 BCE
- Currency: Karshapana
Preceded by
Bharatas (tribe)
Puru (Vedic tribe)
Succeeded by
c. 700 BCE : Vatsa
Mahajanapadas
c. 500 BCE : Ganasangha
Yaudheya
Magadha
- Today part of: India

The Kuru Kingdom was a Vedic Indo-Aryan tribal union in northern India of the Bharata and Puru tribes. The Kuru kingdom appeared in the Middle Vedic period (c. 1200 – c. 900 BCE) during the Iron age of India, encompassing parts of the modern-day states of Haryana, Delhi, and some North parts of Western Uttar Pradesh. The Kuru Kingdom was the first recorded state-level society in the Indian subcontinent.

The Kuru kingdom became a dominant political and cultural force in the middle Vedic Period during the reigns of Parikshit and Janamejaya, but declined in importance during the late Vedic period (c. 900 – c. 500 BCE) and had become "something of a backwater" by the Mahajanapada period in the 5th century BCE. However, traditions and legends about the Kurus continued into the post-Vedic period, providing the basis for the Mahabharata epic.

The Kuru kingdom corresponds with the archaeological Painted Grey Ware culture. The Kuru kingdom collected and standardized the Vedas, reorganizing the scattered, secret ancestral hymns of different clans into systematic collections, forming the bulk of the Rigveda, as well as compiling the Samaveda, Yajurveda and Atharvaveda, the religious heritage of the early Vedic period, arranging their ritual hymns into collections called the Vedas, and developing new rituals, that gained their position in Indian culture as the Srauta rituals. They transformed the historical Vedic religion into Brahmanism, which eventually contributed to the Hindu synthesis.

== Location ==
Kuru state was located in northwestern India, stretching from the Gaṅgā and the border of the Pañcāla in the east to the Sarasvatī and the frontier of Rohītaka in the west, and bordered the Kulindas in the north and the Sūrasenas and Matsya in the south. The area formerly occupied by the Kuru Kingdom covered the presently Thanesar, Delhi, and most of the upper Gangetic Doab.

The Kuru state was itself divided into the Kuru-jaṅgala ("Kuru forest"), the Kuru territory proper, and the Kuru-kṣetra ("Kuru region"):

- Kuru-jaṅgala was a wild area which stretched from the Kāmyaka forest on the banks of the Sarasvatī to the Khāṇḍava forest
- proper Kuru territory consisted of the region around Hāstīnapura
- Kuru-kṣetra was located between the Khāṇḍava forest in the south, Sūrghna in the north, and Parīnaḥ in the west. Kuru-kṣetra was between the Sarasvatī and the Dṛṣadvatī rivers

The rivers flowing within the Kuru state included the Aruṇā, Aṃśumatī, Hiraṇvatī, Āpayā, Kauśikī, Sarasvatī, and Dṛṣadvatī or Rakṣī.

== History ==
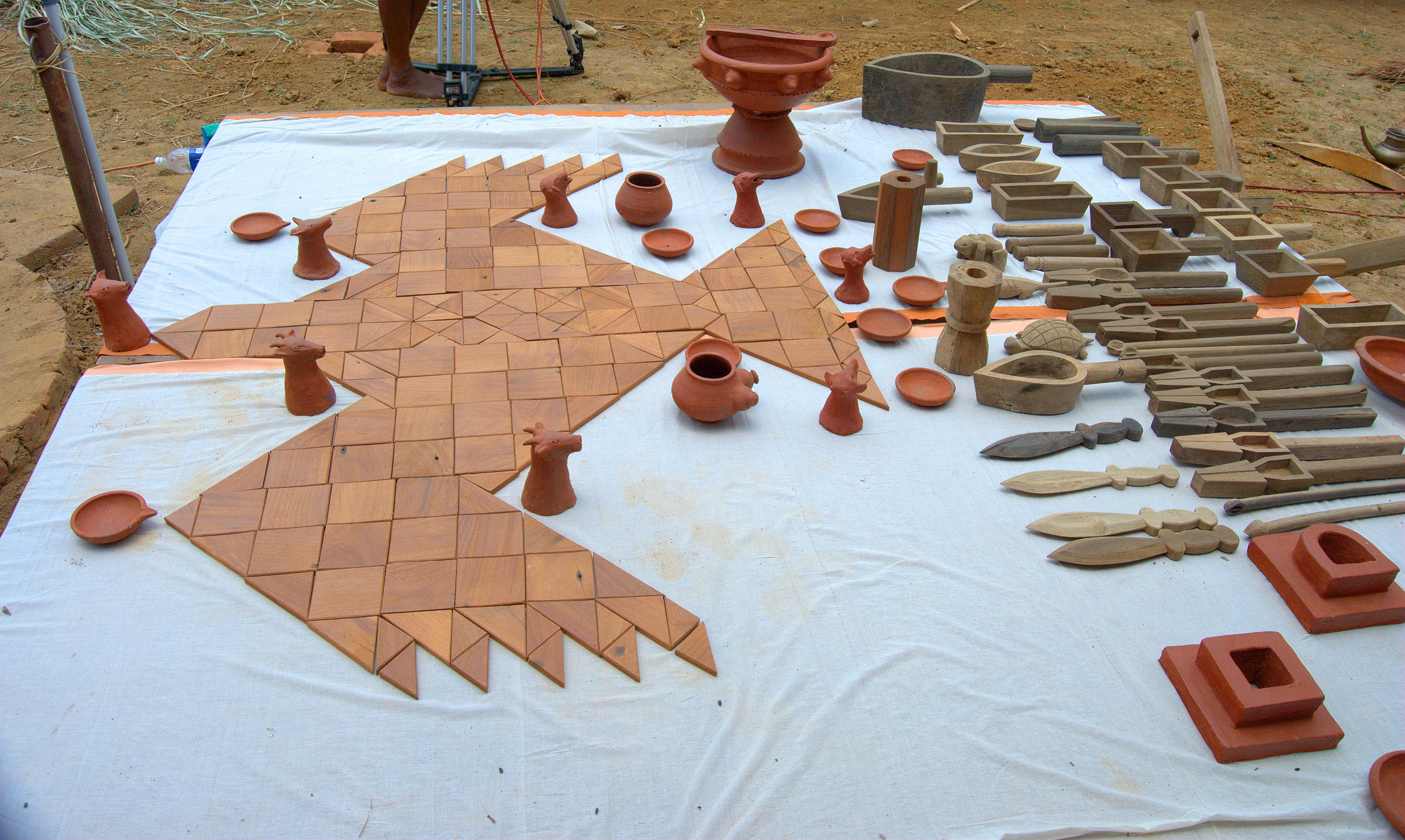
Modern replica of utensils and falcon shaped altar used for Agnicayana, an elaborate srauta ritual from the Kuru period.

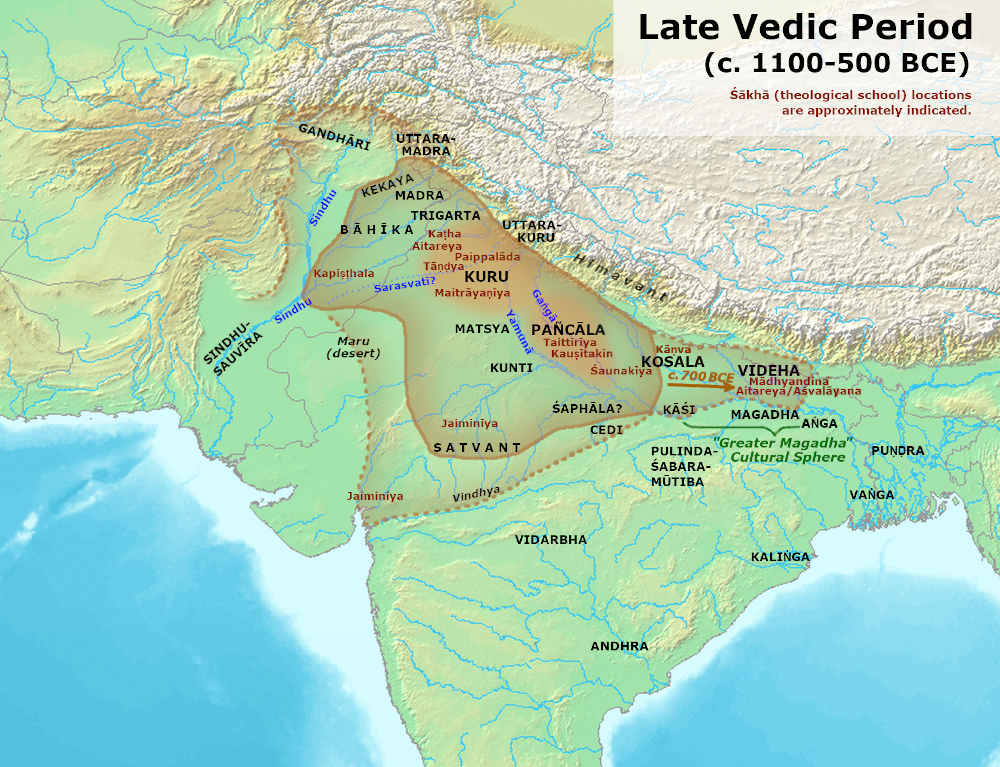
Kuru and other janapadas in Late Vedic period

The main contemporary sources for understanding the Kuru kingdom are the Vedas, containing details of life during this period and allusions to historical persons and events.

=== Formation ===
The Kuru Kingdom was formed in the Middle Vedic period (c. 1200 – c. 900 BCE) as a result of the alliance and merger between the Bharata and Puru tribes, in the aftermath of the Battle of the Ten Kings. With their centre of power in the Kurukshetra region, the Kurus formed the first political centre of the Vedic period and were dominant roughly from 1200 to 800 BCE. The first Kuru capital was at Āsandīvat, identified with modern Assandh in Haryana. Later literature refers to Indraprastha (identified with Purana Qila in modern Delhi) and Hastinapura as the main Kuru cities.

=== Growth ===
The Kurus figure prominently in Vedic literature after the time of the Rigveda. The Kurus here appear as a branch of the early Indo-Aryans, ruling the Ganga-Yamuna Doab and modern Haryana. The focus in the later Vedic period shifted out of Punjab, into the Haryana and the Doab, and thus to the Kuru clan.

The time frame and geographical extent of the Kuru kingdom (as determined by philological study of the Vedic literature) suggest its correspondence with the archaeological Painted Grey Ware culture. The shift out of Punjab corresponds to the increasing number and size of Painted Grey Ware (PGW) settlements in the Haryana and Doab areas.

Although most PGW sites were small farming villages, several PGW sites emerged as relatively large settlements that can be characterised as towns; the largest of these were fortified by ditches or moats and embankments made of piled earth with wooden palisades, albeit smaller and simpler than the elaborate fortifications which emerged in large cities after 600 BCE. Another PGW site has been discovered in Katha village of Bagpat district, which, according to local oral traditions, is believed to have once been the fort of a King called Raja Ror.

Kuru and other Mahajanapadas in Post Vedic period

The Atharvaveda (XX.127) praises Parikshit, the "King of the Kurus", as the great king of a thriving, prosperous realm. Other late Vedic texts, such as the Shatapatha Brahmana, commemorate Parikshit's son Janamejaya as a great conqueror who performed the ashvamedha (horse-sacrifice). These two Kuru kings played a decisive role in the consolidation of the Kuru state and the development of the srauta rituals, and they also appear as important figures in later legends and traditions (e.g., in the Mahabharata).

=== Decline ===
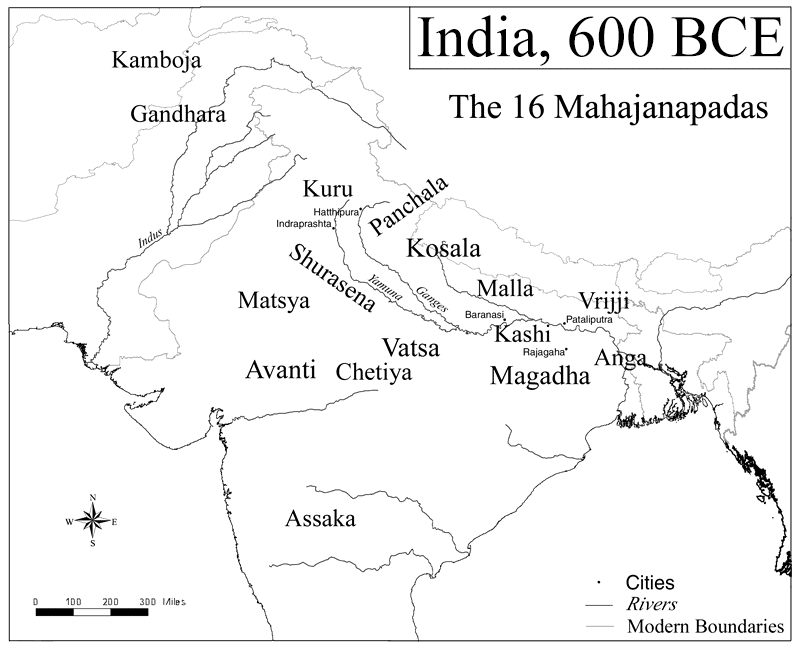
The later Kuru state in the Mahajanapada period, c. 600 BCE

The Kurus declined after being defeated by the non-Vedic Salva (or Salvi) tribe, and the centre of Vedic culture shifted east, into the Panchala Kingdom, in modern-day Uttar Pradesh (whose king Keśin Dālbhya was the nephew of the late Kuru king). According to post-Vedic Sanskrit literature, the capital of the Kurus was later transferred to Kaushambi, in the lower Doab, after Hastinapur was destroyed by floods as well as because of upheavals in the Kuru family itself. (Note: The flooding of Hastinapura and the transfer of the capital to Kaushambi is only mentioned in semi-legendary accounts dating to the post-Vedic era, e.g., Puranas and Mahabharata, whereas Vedic-era texts only mention the invasion of Kurukshetra by the Salva tribe as the cause for the decline of the Kurus.)

In the post-Vedic period (by the 6th century BCE), the Kuru dynasty evolved into Kuru and Vatsa Kingdom, ruling over Upper Doab/Delhi/Haryana and lower Doab, respectively. The Vatsa branch of the Kuru dynasty was further divided into branches at Kaushambi and at Mathura.

According to Buddhist sources, by the late and post-Vedic periods, Kuru had become a minor state ruled by a chieftain called Koravya and belonging to the Yuddhiṭṭhila (Yudhiṣṭhira) gotta (gotra). After the main Kuru ruling dynasty had moved to Kosambi, the Kuru country itself became divided into multiple small states, with the ones at Indapatta (Indraprastha) and one at Iṣukāra being the most prominent ones. By the time of the Buddha, these small states had been replaced by a Kuru Gaṇasaṅgha (republic).

== Society ==
Modern performance of Agnicayana, an elaborate srauta ritual from the Kuru period

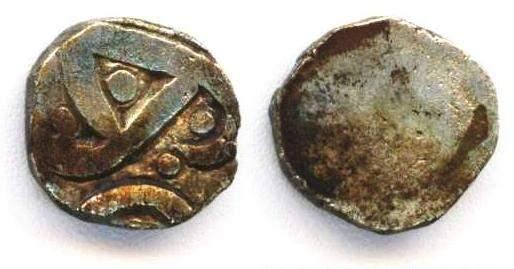
Silver, ½ Karshapana, Indian coin, “Babyal Hoard” type, of the Kuru Janapada (450 BCE – 315 BCE).

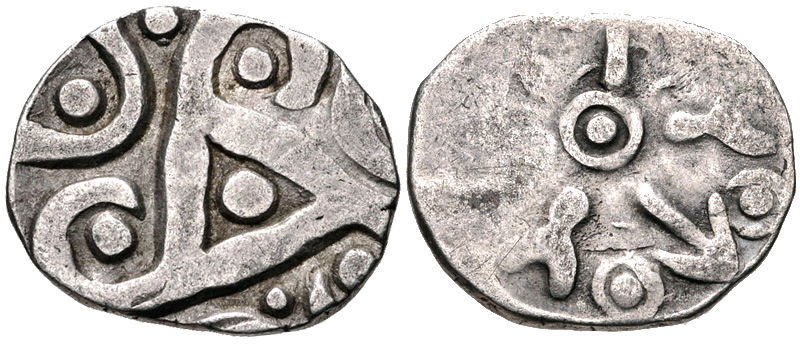
Pre-Mauryan (Ganges Valley) Kurus (Kurukshetras), Silver, ½ Karshapana, Indian coin, “Babyal Hoard” type, c. 350–315 BCE. AR 15 Mana – Half Karshapana (15 mm, 1.50 g). Triskeles-like geometric pattern/aix-armed symbol.

=== Farming and craftmanship ===
The clans that consolidated into the Kuru Kingdom or 'Kuru Pradesh' were largely semi-nomadic, pastoral clans. However, as settlement shifted into the western Ganges Plain, settled farming of rice and barley became more important. Vedic literature of this period indicates the growth of surplus production and the emergence of specialised artisans and craftsmen. Iron was first mentioned as śyāma āyasa (श्याम आयस, literally "dark metal") in the Atharvaveda, a text of this era. The word ayas (अयस् neuter, "metal") meant "copper" originally.

=== Varna-hierarchy ===
An important development was the fourfold varna (class) system, which replaced the twofold system of arya and dasa from the Rigvedic times.

Archaeological surveys of the Kurukshetra district have revealed a more complex (albeit not yet fully urbanised) three-tiered hierarchy for the period of the period from 1000 to 600 BCE, suggesting a complex chiefdom or emerging early state, contrasting with the two-tiered settlement pattern (with some "modest central places", suggesting the existence of simple chiefdoms) in the rest of the Ganges Valley.

In the fourfold varna-system the Brahmin priesthood and Kshatriya aristocracy, who dominated the Arya commoners (now called vaishyas) and the dasa labourers (now called shudras), were designated as separate classes.

=== Religion ===
The Kuru kingdom collected and standardized the Vedas, reorganizing the scattered, secret ancestral hymns of different clans into systematic collections, forming the bulk of the Rigveda, as well as compiling the Samaveda, Yajurveda, and Atharvaveda, the religious heritage of the early Vedic period, arranging their ritual hymns into collections called the Vedas, and developing new rituals, that gained their position in Indian culture as the Srauta rituals.

The Kuru kingdom transformed the Vedic religion into Brahmanism, which eventually spread over the subcontinent, synthesising with local traditions, and together forming Puranic Hinduism.

=== Administration ===
Kuru kings ruled with the assistance of a rudimentary administration, including purohita (priest), village headman, army chief, food distributor, emissary, herald and spies. They extracted mandatory tribute (bali) from their population of commoners as well as from weaker neighbouring tribes. They led frequent raids and conquests against their neighbours, especially to the east and south. To aid in governing, the kings and their Brahmin priests arranged Vedic hymns into collections and developed a new set of rituals (the now orthodox Srauta rituals) to uphold social order and strengthen the class hierarchy. High-ranking nobles could perform very elaborate sacrifices, and many pujas (rituals) primarily exalted the status of the king over his people. The ashvamedha or horse sacrifice was a way for a powerful king to assert his domination in Āryāvarta.

==== Assembly ====
Kuru had two types of legislative assembly:

- The Samiti was a common council of the Jana members, and had the power to elect or dethrone the king.
- The Sabhā was a smaller assembly of wise elders, who advised the king.

== Mahabharata ==
=== Historical aspects ===
The sanskrit epic, Mahabharata, is centered on a conflict between two branches of the reigning Kuru dynasty, possibly around 1000 BCE. However, archaeology has not furnished conclusive proof as to whether the specific events described have any historical basis. The existing text of the Mahabharata went through many layers of development and mostly belongs to the period between c. 400 BCE and 400 CE. Within the frame story of the Mahabharata, the historical kings Parikshit and Janamejaya are featured significantly as scions of the Kuru clan.

A historical Kuru King named Dhritarashtra Vaichitravirya is mentioned in the Kathaka Samhita of the Yajurveda (c. 1200–900 BCE) as a descendant of the Rigvedic-era king Sudas. His cattle were reportedly destroyed as a result of conflict with the vratya ascetics; however, this Vedic mention does not provide corroboration for the accuracy of the Mahabharata's account of his reign.

=== Kuru family tree ===
This shows the line of royal and family succession, not necessarily the parentage. See the notes below for detail.

Kuru family tree

Kuru^{[a]}
Anasawan^{[a]}
Bheemasena(1)^{[a]}
Pratisravas^{[a]}
Pratipa^{[a]}
Gangā	Shāntanu^{[a]}	Satyavati	Pārāshara
Bhishma	Chitrāngada	Ambikā	Vichitravirya	Ambālikā	Vyāsa
Dhritarāshtra^{b}	Gāndhāri	Shakuni	Surya (Deva)	Kunti	Pāndu^{b}	Mādri
Karna^{c}	Yudhishthira^{d}	Bhima^{d}	Arjuna^{d}	Subhadrā	Nakula^{d}	Sahadeva^{d}
Duryodhana^{e}	Dussalā	Dushāsana	(98 sons)
Abhimanyu^{f}	Uttarā
Parikshit	Madravti
Janamejaya

Key to Symbols

- Male: blue border
- Female: red border
- Pandavas: green box
- Kauravas: yellow box

Notes

- a: Shantanu was a king of the Kuru dynasty or kingdom, and was some generations removed from any ancestor called Kuru. His marriage to Ganga preceded his marriage to Satyavati.
- b: Pandu and Dhritarashtra were fathered by Vyasa in the niyoga tradition after Vichitravirya's death. Dhritarashtra, Pandu and Vidura were the sons of Vyasa with Ambika, Ambalika and a maid servant respectively.
- c: Karna was born to Kunti through her invocation of Surya, before her marriage to Pandu.
- d: Yudhishthira, Bhima, Arjuna, Nakula and Sahadeva were acknowledged sons of Pandu but were begotten by the invocation by Kunti and Madri of various deities. They all married Draupadi (not shown in tree).
- e: Duryodhana and his siblings were born at the same time, and they were of the same generation as their Pandava cousins.
- f : Although the succession after the Pandavas was through the descendants of Arjuna and Subhadra, it was Yudhishthira and Draupadi who occupied the throne of Hastinapura after the great battle.

The birth order of siblings is correctly shown in the family tree (from left to right), except for Vyasa and Bhishma whose birth order is not described, and Vichitravirya and Chitrangada who were born after them. The fact that Ambika and Ambalika are sisters is not shown in the family tree. The birth of Duryodhana took place after the birth of Karna and Yudhishthira, but before the birth of the remaining Pandava brothers.

Some siblings of the characters shown here have been left out for clarity; this includes Vidura, half-brother to Dhritarashtra and Pandu.

== See also ==
Kuru related

- King Kuru
- Uttara Kuru Kingdom
- Kurukshetra War
- List of Kuru kings
- Bharatas (Vedic tribe)

Other Mahabharta related

- Kauravas, Pandavas
- Parikshit, Janamejaya
- Assandh, Hastinapur, Indraprastha
- Historicity of the Mahabharata
- Panchala, Videha, Magadha, Nishada, Kosala

Modern archaeology of the Vedic era

- Cemetery H culture
- Painted Grey Ware culture
- Black and red ware
- Ochre Coloured Pottery culture

Present day regions

- Regions of Haryana
- Regions of Rajasthan
- Regions of Uttar Pradesh

== Sources ==
- Hiltebeitel, Alf (2002), Hinduism. In: Joseph Kitagawa, "The Religious Traditions of Asia: Religion, History, and Culture", Routledge, ISBN 9781136875977
- Pletcher, Kenneth (2010), The History of India, The Rosen Publishing Group, ISBN 9781615301225
- Raychaudhuri, Hemchandra (1953). Political History of Ancient India: From the Accession of Parikshit to the Extinction of Gupta Dynasty. University of Calcutta.
- Samuel, Geoffrey (2010), The Origins of Yoga and Tantra. Indic Religions to the Thirteenth Century, Cambridge University Press
- Witzel, Michael (1990), "On Indian Historical Writing" (PDF), Journal of the Japanese Association for South Asian Studies, 2: 1–57
- Witzel, Michael (1995), "Early Sanskritization: Origin and Development of the Kuru state" (PDF), EJVS, 1 (4), archived from the original (PDF) on 11 June 2007
- Misra, Sudama (1973). Janapada state in ancient India. Vārāṇasī: Bhāratīya Vidyā Prakāśana. Archived from the original on 17 August 2016.
