= Pravahana Jaivali =

Ruler of Panchala Kingdom

Pravahana Jaivali was a king of Panchala during the Late Vedic period (8th or 7th century BCE), mentioned in the Brihadaranyaka Upanishad (Vi.ii.9-13) and the Chandogya Upanishad (V.4-8).

Like King Ajatashatru of Kashi and King Asvapati Kaikeya of Madra, he is depicted as a major Hindu philosopher-king. He was the contemporary of King Janaka of Videha, and is among the most famous kings of Uttara Pañchāla-rattha who ruled from Kampila-nagara, the others being Kraivya, Keśin Dālbhya, Śona Sātrāsāha and Durmukha.

He teaches Svetaketu, son of Uddalaka Aruni who was a disciple of Dhaumya Ayoda (Mahabharata I.iii.20), his celebrated Panchagni Vidya i.e. the "Doctrine of the Five Fires" that explains the process of rebirth, which is an upasana.

This doctrine is in answer to the five questions of the King. And, thus taught the 'two-path doctrine of transmigration', which knowledge had never been in possession of the Brahmins.

== Historical Mentions ==
Pravahana Jaivali, who was well-versed in udgitha, held that the Universe exhibits at every stage the principle of sacrifice in as much as the heaven by itself is a great altar in which the sun is burning as fuel from the oblation that is offered in this sacrifice, namely shraddha, rises the Moon; looking at the sky again it is seen that parjanya is the great altar in which the year is burning as fuel from the oblation offered in this sacrifice, namely the Moon, rises Rain; then again the whole world is a great altar in which the earth burns as fuel from the oblation offered in this sacrifice, namely Rain, rises Food; man himself is a great altar in which the opened mouth is the fuel from the oblation offered in his sacrifice, namely Food, rises Seed; and finally woman herself is a great altar in which Seed being offered as an oblation, rises Man. This is his celebrated "Doctrine of the Five Fires". In the Kaushitaki Upanishad Version, this knowledge is imparted by King Citra Gangayayani (Gargyayani), in which version the emphasis is on the ignorance of Gautama Uddalaka rather than on the arrogance of the proud and impetuous Svetaketu who was proud of his learning.

From the Chandogya Upanishad it is known that Pravahana Jaivali had speculated that 'space' (Ākāśa) is the final habitat of all things. Śilaka Sālāvatya and Caikitāyana Dālbhya who were experts in the Udagitha were the disciples of Pravahana Jaivali who was born after Udara Śhāṇḍilya and Satyakāma Jābāla with whom they held a discussion on the origin of the world. Śilaka found the solution in 'water'; Dālbhya, in 'heaven'; and Pravahana Jaivali, in 'space' (Ākāśa) denoting Brahman. Pravahana Jaivali’s three noteworthy speculations are – a) the Doctrine of the immortality of the soul, b) the first philosophic recognition of belief in rebirth and retribution (heaven and hell) or transmigration of the soul, and c) virtual denial of soul in beings other than humans. He too, like Jābāla, described the path taken by the soul after death of the body, Devayāna (the path of the gods), – the soul of the wise person assuming a luminous form passes from light to greater light until it reaches Brahman. He speaks about the mundane soul, the infernal soul and the animal soul. By his doctrine of immortality and general eschatological theory he explains why the world of generation is never full.
