= Painted Grey Ware culture =

North Indian Iron Age culture

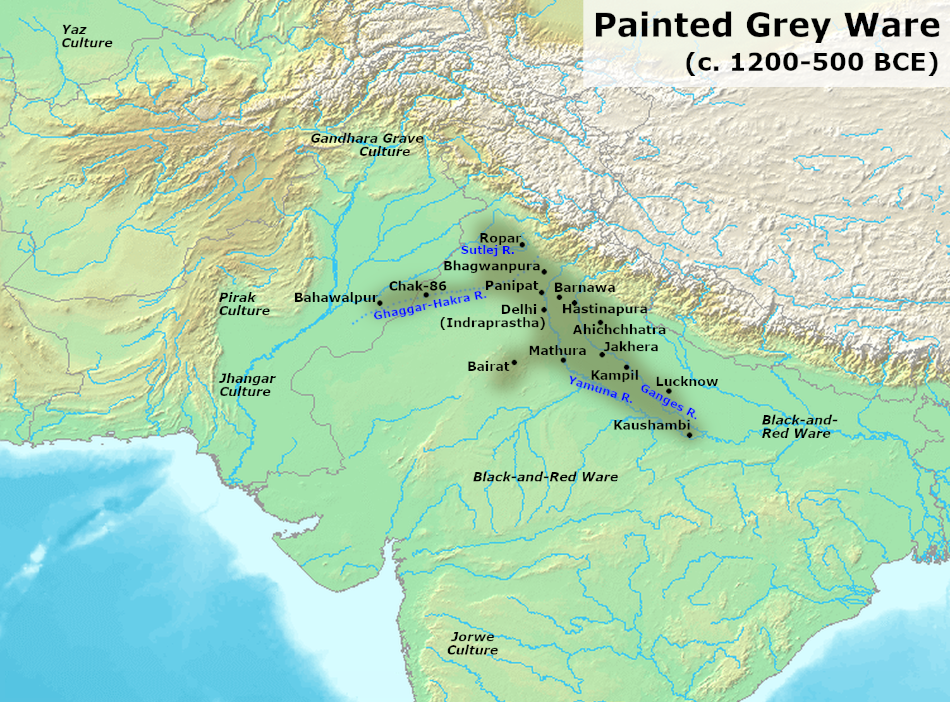
- Map of some Painted Grey Ware (PGW) sites
- Geographical range: North India; Eastern Pakistan
- Period: Iron Age
- Dates: c. 1200–600 BCE
- Major sites: Hastinapur; Mathura; Ahichchhatra; Panipat; Jognakhera; Rupnagar; Bhagwanpura; Kosambi
- Characteristics: Extensive iron metallurgy; Fortified settlement
- Preceded by: Cemetery H culture; Black and red ware; Ochre Coloured Pottery culture
- Followed by: Mahajanapadas

The Painted Grey Ware culture (PGW) is an Iron Age Indo-Aryan culture of the western Gangetic plain and the Ghaggar-Hakra valley in the Indian subcontinent, conventionally dated c.1200 to 600–500 BCE, or from 1300 to 500–300 BCE. It is a successor of the Cemetery H culture and black and red ware culture (BRW) within this region, and contemporary with the continuation of the BRW culture in the eastern Gangetic plain and Central India.

Cemetery H, Late Harappan, OCP, Copper Hoard and Painted Grey ware sites

Characterized by a style of fine, grey pottery painted with geometric patterns in black, the PGW culture is associated with village and town settlements, domesticated horses, ivory-working, and the advent of iron metallurgy. As of 2018, 1,576 PGW sites have been discovered. Although most PGW sites were small farming villages, "several dozen" PGW sites emerged as relatively large settlements that can be characterized as towns; the largest of these were fortified by ditches or moats and embankments made of piled earth with wooden palisades, albeit smaller and simpler than the elaborate fortifications which emerged in large cities after 600 BCE.

The PGW Culture probably corresponds to the middle and late Vedic period, i.e., the Kuru-Panchala kingdom, the first large state in the Indian subcontinent after the decline of the Indus Valley Civilisation. The later vedic literature provides a mass of information on the life and culture of the times. It is succeeded by Northern Black Polished Ware c. 700–500 BCE, associated with the rise of the great Mahajanapada states and of the Magadha Empire.

== Dating ==
The Painted Grey Ware culture (PGW) is conventionally dated c.1200 to 500 BCE.

Akinori Uesugi regards PGW as having three periods within North Indian Iron Age which are:

Period I (c. 1300–1000 BCE)
When it makes its appearance in the Ghaggar valley and the upper Ganga region.
Period II (c. 1000–600 BCE)
When it spreads into the western part of the Ganga valley.
Period III (c. 600–300 BCE)
With interactions to the east.

== Overview ==
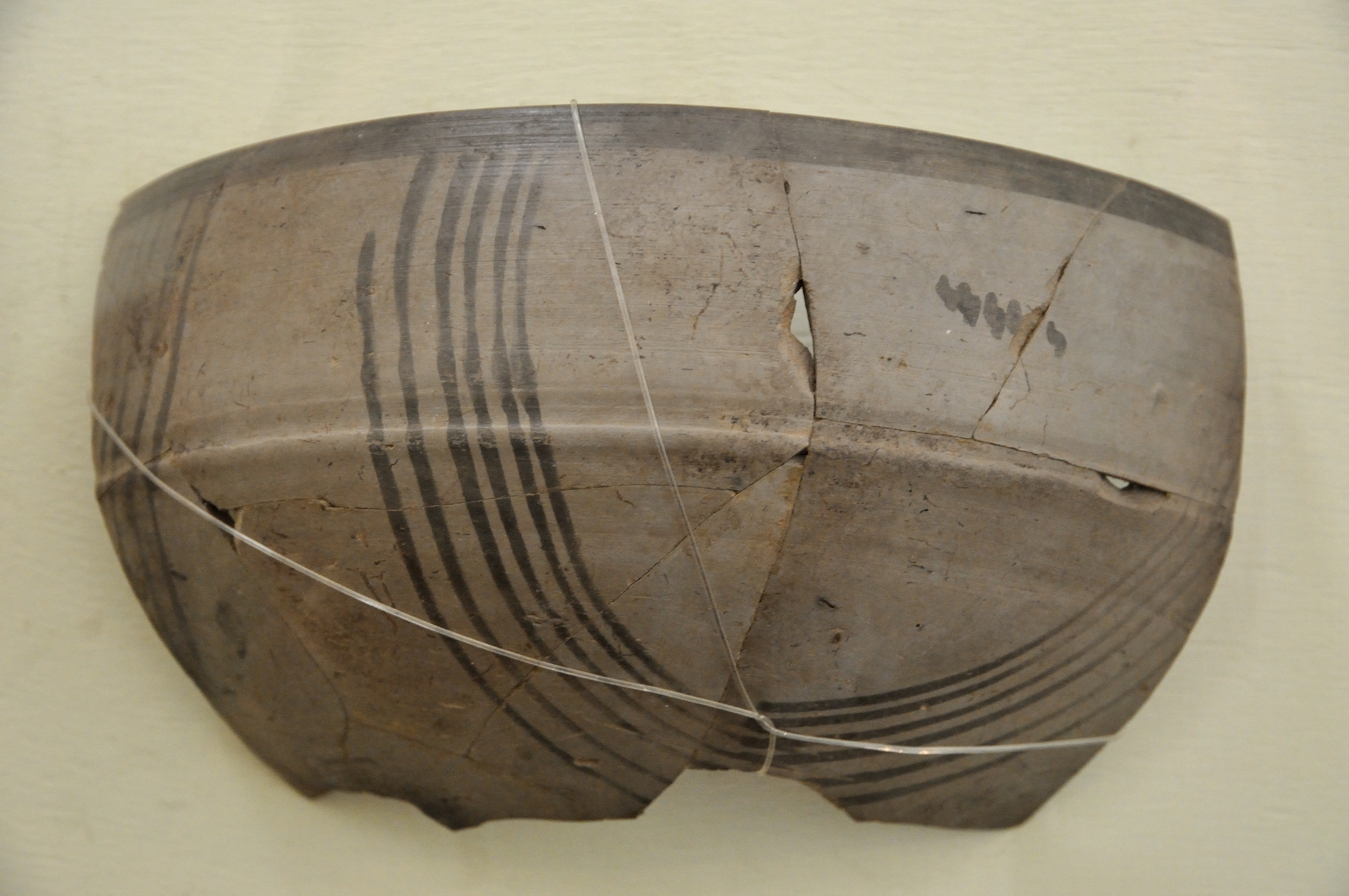
Painted Grey Ware, Sonkh (Uttar Pradesh), 1000–600 BCE. Government Museum, Mathura

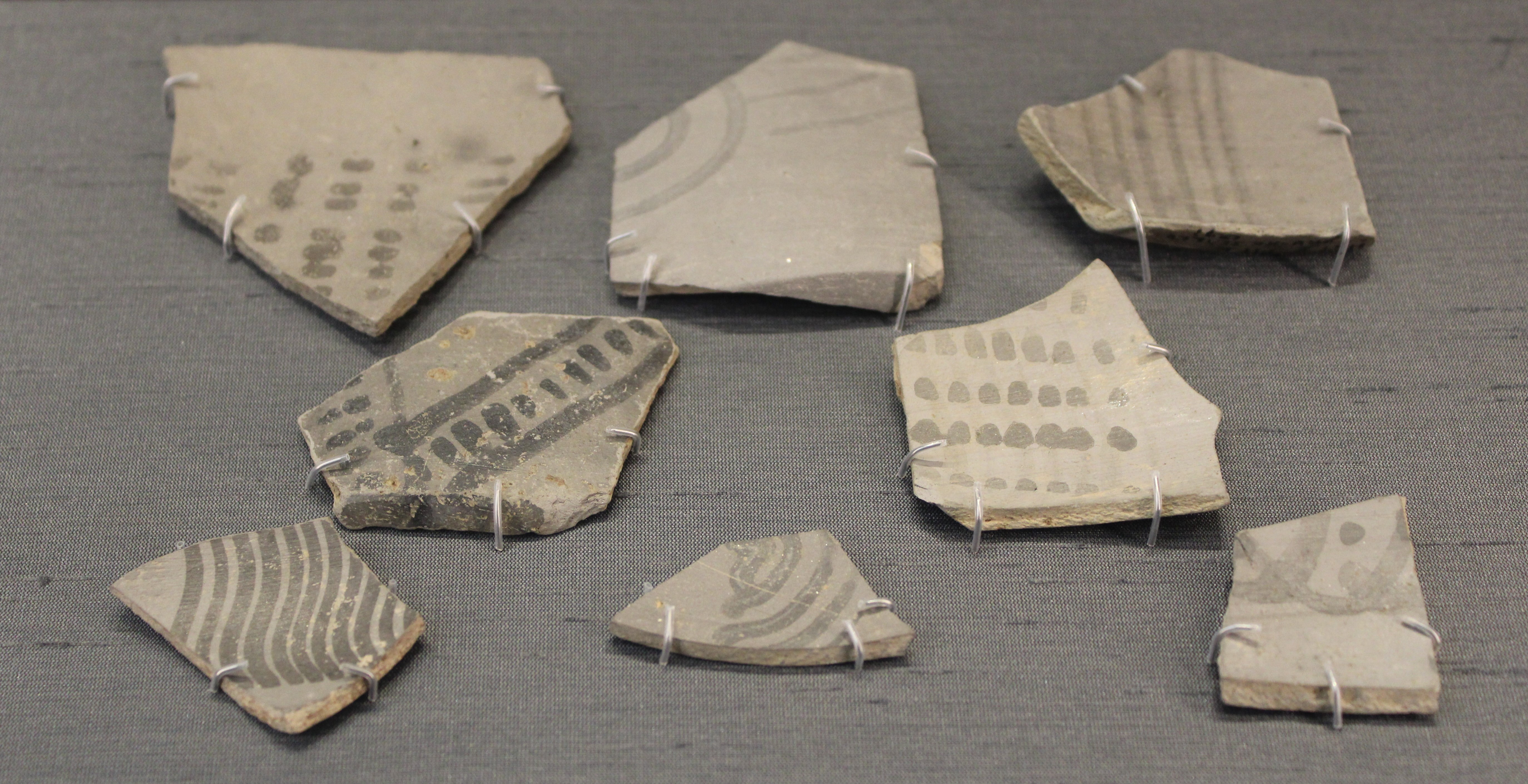
Fragments of Painted Grey Ware, about 1000 BC, from Hastinapur and Radhakund, Uttar Pradesh, and Panipat and Tilpat, Haryana. British Museum

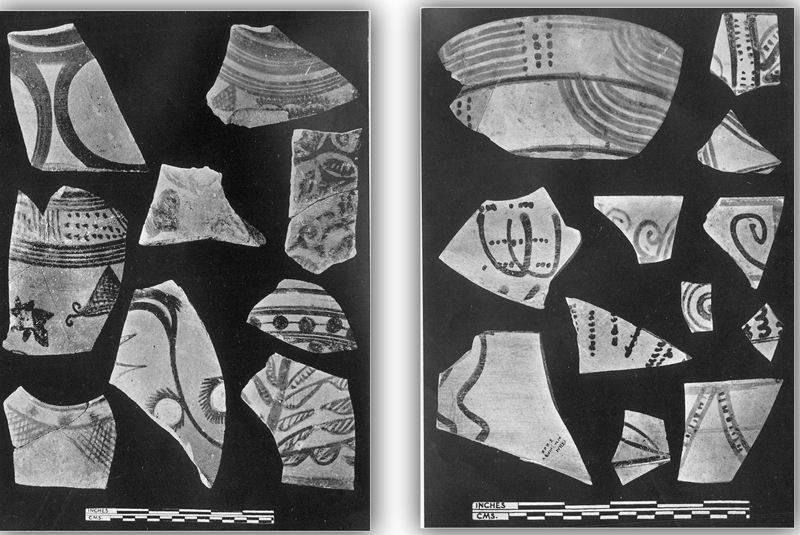
Shards of Painted Grey Ware (right) and Harappan red pottery (left) from Rupnagar, Punjab

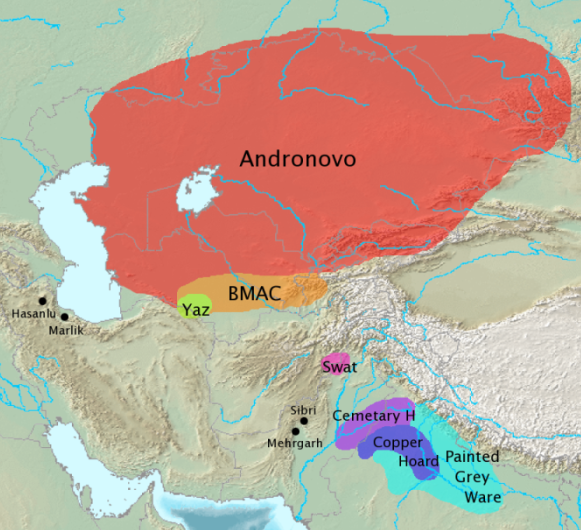
Archaeological cultures associated with Indo-Iranian migrations (after EIEC). The Andronovo, BMAC and Yaz cultures have often been associated with Indo-Iranian migrations. The GGC (Swat), Cemetery H, Copper Hoard and PGW cultures are candidates for cultures associated with Indo-Aryan migrations.

The PGW culture cultivated rice, wheat, millet and barley, and domesticated cattle, sheep, pigs, and horses. Houses were built of wattle-and-daub, mud, or bricks, ranging in size from small huts to large houses with many rooms. There is a clear settlement hierarchy, with a few central towns that stand out amongst numerous small villages. Some sites, including Jakhera in Uttar Pradesh, demonstrate a "fairly evolved, proto-urban or semi-urban stage" of this culture, with evidence of social organization and trade, including ornaments of gold, copper, ivory, and semi-precious stones, storage bins for surplus grain, stone weights, paved streets, water channels and embankments.

The plough was used for cultivation. There are also indications of growing complexity of society as population increased and the size and number of settlements multiplied. Arts and crafts of the PGW people are represented by ornaments (made from terracotta, stone, faience, and glass), human and animal figurines (made from terracotta) as well as "incised terracotta discs with decorated edges and geometric motifs" which probably had "ritual meaning", perhaps representing symbols of deities. There are a few stamp seals with geometric designs but no inscription, contrasting with both the prior Harappan seals and the subsequent Brahmi-inscribed seals of the Northern Black Polished Ware culture.

The PGW pottery shows a remarkable degree of standardization. It is dominated by bowls of two shapes, a shallow tray and a deeper bowl, often with a sharp angle between the walls and base. The range of decoration is limited – vertical, oblique or criss-cross lines, rows of dots, spiral chains and concentric circles being common.

At Bhagwanpura in the Kurukshetra district of Haryana, excavations have revealed an overlap between the late Harappan and Painted Grey Ware cultures, large houses that may have been elite residences, and fired bricks that may have been used in Vedic altars.

Fresh surveys by archaeologist Vinay Kumar Gupta suggest Mathura was the largest PGW site around 375 hectares in area. Among the largest sites is also the recently excavated Ahichatra, with at least 40 hectares of area in PGW times along with evidence of early construction of the fortification which goes back to PGW levels. Towards the end of the period, many of the PGW settlements grew into the large towns and cities of the Northern Black Polished Ware period.

== Interpretations ==
The pottery style of this culture is different from the pottery of the Iranian Plateau and Afghanistan (Bryant 2001). In some sites, PGW pottery and Late Harappan pottery are contemporaneous. The archaeologist Jim Shaffer (1984:84–85) has noted that "at present, the archaeological record indicates no cultural discontinuities separating Painted Grey Ware from the indigenous protohistoric culture." However, the continuity of pottery styles may be explained by the fact that pottery was generally made by indigenous craftsmen even after the Indo-Aryan migration. According to Chakrabarti (1968) and other scholars, the origins of the subsistence patterns (e.g. rice use) and most other characteristics of the Painted Grey Ware culture are in eastern India or even Southeast Asia. (Note: See also Indo-Aryan migration#Archaeological evidence.)

== Recent archaeology ==
In 2015, two periods of PGW were identified, at Ahichhatra, the earliest from c. 1500 to 800 BCE, and the late from 800 to 400 BCE. (Note: Petrie et al. (2019) mention 1500 to 700 BCE.)

In 2014, the PGW horizon of Kampil excavations were published as 2310 ± 120 BCE and 1360 ± 90 BCE by archaeologist D. P. Tewari.

In 2013, further excavations at Alamgirpur, near Delhi, revealed contiguous occupation of the site, from Early Harappan, through Mature Harappan, Late Harappan, and into a period overlap between the later part of the Harappan phase (with a "noticeable slow decline in quality") and the earliest PGW levels; a sample of beans and grains from this transition layer (ZB 26 OxA-21882) offered a radiocarbon dating of 3659 ± 31 years BP (1647 BCE).

In 2009, a team of the Archaeological Survey of India led by B. R. Mani and Vinay Kumar Gupta collected charcoal samples from the spoil of an illegally excavated, government protected mound at Gosna, a site 6 km east of Mathura across the Yamuna river, where two of the radiocarbon dates came out to be 2160 BCE and 2170 BCE. The site may have had a plain or painted grey ware association, but the evidence has been lost.

In 2006, excavation at Anuradhapura in Sri Lanka has unearthed Plain Grey Ware pottery (in North India associated with Painted Grey Ware) from the 'Basal early historic' period of Anuradhapura (600–500 BCE) showing connections with North India.

== See also ==
- Kuru kingdom
- Panchala
- Mahajanapadas
