= Surasena =

Ancient Indian region

Kingdom of Surasena
- c. 700 BCE–c. 300 BCE
- Surasena and other Mahajanapadas in the post-Vedic period.
- Capital: Mathura
- Common languages: Sanskrit, Prakrit
- Religion: Historical Vedic religion Jainism; Buddhism
- Government: Monarchy
- Maharaja
- Historical era: Bronze Age, Iron Age
  - Established: c. 700 BCE
  - Disestablished: c. 300 BCE
Succeeded by
Magadha
- Today part of: India

The kingdom of Surasena (IAST: Śūrasena, Sanskrit: शूरसेन) was an ancient Indian region corresponding to the present-day Braj region in Uttar Pradesh, with Mathura as its capital city. According to the Buddhist text Anguttara Nikaya, Surasena was one of the sixteen Mahajanapadas (lit. 'great realms') in the 6th century BCE. Also, it is mentioned in the Hindu epic poem Ramayana. The ancient Greek writers (e.g., Megasthenes) refer to the Sourasenoi and its cities, Methora and Cleisobra/Kleisobora .

== Location ==
The Śūrasena state was located on the Yamunā river, and its capital was the city of Mathurā.

== Origin ==
It is speculated that the Surasena kingdom was established by Šúraséna on the banks of Saraswati. The Surasenas claimed their descent from the Yadus mentioned in the Rigveda. Surasena was one of the sixteen Mahajanapadas. The Sura-sena Janapada was occupied by Vrishnis and Andhakas, branches of the Yadu tribe.

== History ==
The Mahabharata and the Puranas refer to the rulers of the Mathura region as the Yadus or Yadavas, divided into a number of septs, which include the Vrishnis. The Buddhist texts refer to Avantiputta, the king of the Surasenas in the time of Maha Kachchana, one of the chief disciples of Gautama Buddha, who spread Buddhism in the Mathura region.

Its capital, Mathura, was situated on the bank of the river Yamuna, presently a sacred place for the Hindus. The ancient Greek writers mention another city, named Cleisobora, in this region.

Archaeological excavations at Mathura show the gradual growth of a village into an important city. The earliest period belonged to the Painted Grey Ware culture (1100–500 BCE), followed by the Northern Black Polished Ware culture (700–200 BCE). Mathura derived its importance as a center of trade due to its location where the northern trade route of the Gangetic Plain met with the routes to Malwa (central India) and the west coast.

== Gallery ==
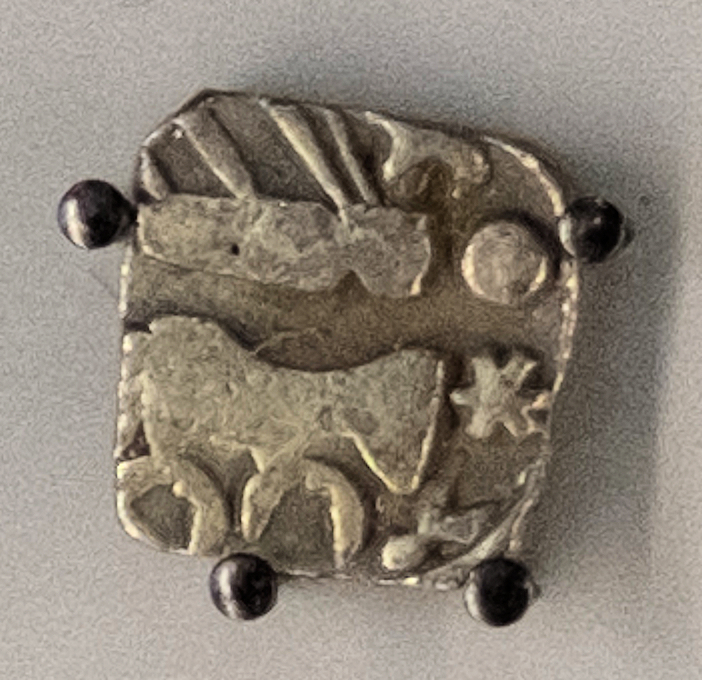
Saurasena coin, 400–300 BCE.

== Sources ==
1. Raychaudhuri, H.C. (1972), Political History of Ancient India: From the Accession of Parikshit to the Extinction of the Gupta Dynasty, Calcutta: University of Calcutta.
2. Singh, Upinder (2008), A History of Ancient and Early Medieval India: From the Stone Age to the 12th Century, Delhi: Pearson Education, ISBN 978-81-317-1677-9.
