= Sagar =

Sagar may refer to:

== Places and jurisdictions ==
=== India ===
- Sagar, Madhya Pradesh, a city in Madhya Pradesh, India
  - Sagar district, an administrative unit headquartered in the city
  - Sagar division, an administrative unit headquartered in the city
  - Sagar railway station
  - Sagar (Lok Sabha constituency) (Indian federal parliament)
  - Sagar (Madhya Pradesh Vidhan Sabha constituency) (state parliament)
  - Syro-Malabar Catholic Eparchy of Sagar (Eastern Catholic diocese, Chaldean=Syro-oriental rite)
  - Sagar University
- Sagar Island, also known as Ganga Sagar, pilgrimage centre in West Bengal about 150 km south of Kolkata
  - Sagar Port
  - Sagar Mahavidyalaya
  - Sagar (community development block)
  - Sagar (West Bengal Vidhan Sabha constituency)
- Sagara, Karnataka, a city in Shimoga district, Karnataka, India
  - Sagar (Vidhana Sabha constituency)
- Sagar, Yadgir district, a village in Yadgir district, Karnataka, India

=== Europe ===
- Zagor or Sagar, Germany
- Deutsch Sagar, the old German name of the village Nowy Zagór, Dąbie, Lubusz Voivodeship, Poland

== Arts and fiction ==
- Sagar (2012 film), a 2012 Kannada film
- Sagar (1951 film)
- Sagar Films, also known as Sagar Arts, Indian film company
- Sagar Alias Jacky, a character in Malayalam films
- Sagar, a fictional planet where the 1981 animated TV series Blackstar takes place

== People ==
- Sagar (caste), a caste in India
- Sagar (name), an Indian male given name
  - Sagar (actor), Indian actor in Telugu cinema
  - Sagar (singer), Indian playback singer for films
  - Sagar Pandey "Majnu Bhai", fictional criminal played by Anil Kapoor in the 2007 Indian film Welcome

== Other uses ==
- Sagar v Ridehalgh & Sons Ltd, a 1931 UK labour law case
- Sagar Mala project, an initiative by the government of India to enhance the performance of the country's logistics sector
- Security and Growth for All in the Region (SAGAR)
- Cyclone Sagar, a 2018 cyclone which affected the Horn of Africa

== See also ==
- Himayat Sagar, an artificial lake near Hyderabad, Telangana, India
- Hussain Sagar, an artificial lake in Hyderabad, Telangana, India
- Saagar (disambiguation)
- Saggar, a ceramic boxlike container used in the firing of pottery
- Saghar (disambiguation)
- Saga (disambiguation)
- Sagara (disambiguation)
- Sagri (disambiguation)
- Sagarika (disambiguation)
- Vidyasagar (disambiguation)
