= Samandar =

Samandar may refer to:

== Places ==
- Samandar (city), a city in Khazaria on the western edge of the Caspian Sea, south of Atil and north of the Caucasus
- Samandar, Iran, a village in Razavi Khorasan Province, Iran
- Samandar, Afghanistan, a settlement in Maidan Wardak Province, Afghanistan (34, 21, 0,N, 68, 35, 0,E)
- Kázim-i-Samandar, one of the Apostles of Bahá'u'lláh, and a prominent teacher of the Bahá'í Faith, known as Samandar

== Media ==
- Samundar, a 1986 Indian TV series on Doordarshan
- Samandar (TV series), a 1995–1996 Indian television series about Indian naval personnel that aired on Doordarshan
- Samandar (film), a 2024 Indian Gujarati-language film by Vishal Vada Vala

== See also ==
- Samudra, Sanskrit word for the ocean
- Samudram (1977 film), India
- Samudram (1999 film), India
- Samudrala (disambiguation)
- Sagara (disambiguation)
