= Saagar =

Saagar may refer to:

- Saagar (1985 film), a Bollywood film directed by Ramesh Sippy
- Saagar (1951 film), a Hindi-language film directed by P. Jairaj,\
- Saagar (album), a 2002 album by Pakistani pop band Fuzön
- Aiysha Saagar (born 1980), Australian pop singer, performer, and glamour model

== See also ==
- Sagar (disambiguation)
- Sagara (disambiguation)
- Sagarika (disambiguation)
- Sagri (disambiguation)
