= RV6 =

RV6 may refer to:

- Boss RV-6, a digital reverb pedal manufactured by Boss Corporation
- Mandala 6, the sixth mandala of the Rigveda
- Van's Aircraft RV-6, a kit aircraft
