= Samudrala =

Samudrala is a Telugu surname and may refer to:

- Samudrala Sr. (1902–1968), writer, producer, and director
- Samudrala Jr. (1923–1985), film writer and son of Samudrala Sr.
- Samudrala Venugopal Chary (fl. 1985–2009), Indian politician
- Ram Samudrala (born 1972), Indian-American professor of bioinformatics

== See also ==
- Samandar (disambiguation)
- Samudra, Sanskrit word for the ocean
