= Saghar =

Saghar may refer to:

== Places ==
- Saghar District, in Afghanistan
- Saghar, Afghanistan, a village
- Saghar, Pakistan, a village in Punjab

== People ==
- Saghar Azizi (born 1977), Iranian actress
- Saghar Nizami (1905–1983), Indian poet
- Saghar Siddiqui (1928–1974), Pakistani poet
- Riaz ur Rehman Saghar (1941–2013), Pakistani poet and film song lyricist
