= Stoning of Rukhshana =

2015 stoning of a 19-year-old Afghan girl

Rukhshana
- Born: c. 1996
- Died: 2015 (aged approximately 19); Ghor Province, Afghanistan
- Known for: Being stoned to death by the Taliban

Rukhshana (born c. 1996) was a 19-year-old Afghan girl who was stoned to death by the Taliban in 2015 in Ghor Province, Afghanistan, on charges of adultery. The incident occurred when Rukhshana and her 23-year-old fiancé fled their homes in an attempt to get married. Upon being captured, Rukhshana was stoned to death, while her fiancé was flogged.

== Biography and death ==
Rukhshana was the second child in her family and had studied for eight years at Abadak School in the Ghalmin area of Firozkoh, Ghor Province. When she turned 13, her father, Abdul Karim, arranged her marriage to a disabled man. However, Rukhshana refused the marriage and fled with a boy she had dreamed of marrying since childhood, named Mohammad Gul. The two escaped to Saghar District in Ghor Province.

After some time, security forces captured Rukhshana and handed her over to her father. Once again, her father forced her into marriage with an elderly man against her will. However, she fled once more with Mohammad Gul to Murghab village. On their way, Mullah Yusuf, a local Taliban commander who had previously proposed Rukhshana for his brother multiple times, intercepted and arrested her.

At first, the Taliban demanded 5 million Afghanis from Rukhshana's father in exchange for her release. Rukhshana's father spoke about the threats his family received from the Taliban forces:

After killing Rukhshana, the Taliban and local warlords attacked us multiple times to kill all members of our family. But we left our home at night and fled to Firozkoh with my children.

Since her father could not afford the ransom, Mullah Hashim, one of the Taliban clerics, issued the order for Rukhshana's stoning. This sentence was delivered three months after Rukhshana's capture in a kangaroo court. Rukhshana's father was asked to attend the execution site and witness her stoning in person. The stoning was recorded and shared, sparking widespread reactions.

== Released video ==
During Rukhshana's stoning, a video was recorded showing several armed men and young males placing her in a pit up to her neck and pelting her with stones. Rukhshana's cries of pain are clearly heard in the video, while the armed men, the first to stone her, repeatedly urge her: "Say your Shahada!". The video went viral on social media.

== Arrest of perpetrators ==
Following Rukhshana's death, Afghanistan's Ministry of Interior ordered the police to arrest those responsible. During the police investigation, forty individuals involved in the stoning were identified.

However, in 2017, Mawlawi Saadiyar, a key Taliban commander involved in Rukhshana's stoning, surrendered to government forces and, suffering from illness, was placed under medical care. After his arrest, the Taliban made multiple attempts to secure his release.

Saadiyar was responsible for killing dozens of civilians in addition to his role in Rukhshana's stoning. A member of the terrorist group ISIS, he was released after only two months in prison. The release of this Taliban and ISIS commander triggered strong reactions from civil society activists.

== Reactions ==
Rukhshana's stoning sparked widespread national and international reactions. The then-President of Afghanistan, Ashraf Ghani, condemned the incident as a crime and formed a delegation comprising representatives from the Ministry of Interior, Attorney General's Office, National Security, Local Governance Administration, and the Independent Human Rights Commission to investigate the case. Abdul Rauf Ibrahimi, a representative of the House of the People in the National Assembly of Afghanistan, condemned the crime and called for severe punishment for the perpetrators.
