= Sagri =

Sagri may refer to:

- Sagri (Rawalpindi), a town and union council in Punjab, Pakistan
- Sagri (Jhelum), a village in Dina Tehsil, Punjab, Pakistan
- Sagri (Assembly constituency), a constituency of the Azamgarh district of Uttar Pradesh, India

== See also ==
- Saagri (disambiguation)
- Sagar (disambiguation)
- Saagar (disambiguation)
- Sagarika (disambiguation)
- Sagari Chhabra, Indian writer and film director
