= Titan, Afghanistan =

Titan تیتان
- Location in Afghanistan
- Coordinates: 33°41′29″N 63°52′1″E
- Country: Afghanistan
- Province: Ghor
- District: Saghar
- Elevation: 7,106 ft (2,166 m)
- Time zone: UTC+4:30

Titan (Dari: تیتان) is the district center of Saghar District, Ghor province, Afghanistan. It is located at 33.6914°N 63.8669°E at 2,166 m altitude. Very close to Titan is the village of Saghar which gives the name of the district.

== Climate ==
Titan has a warm-summer humid continental climate (Dsb) under the Köppen climate classification system. Temperatures typically range between −5 and 21 °C (23 and 70 °F) through the year, but rarely can drop to −23 °C (−9 °F) or can rise to as high as 33 °C (91 °F).

The warmest months in Titan are June, July and August, with daily mean temperatures ranging from 18 to 21 °C (64 to 70 °F) throughout the day. The coldest temperatures usually occur in January, February and December, when daily mean temperatures range from −5 to −1 °C (23 to 30 °F) throughout the day. On average each year, Titan experiences 86 days above 25 °C (77 °F) and 139 days below 0 °C (32 °F).

Climate data for Titan, Ghor Province
| Month | Jan | Feb | Mar | Apr | May | Jun | Jul | Aug | Sep | Oct | Nov | Dec | Year |
|---|---|---|---|---|---|---|---|---|---|---|---|---|---|
| Record high °C (°F) | 13.7 (56.7) | 20.1 (68.2) | 27.1 (80.8) | 28.9 (84.0) | 33.4 (92.1) | 37.3 (99.1) | 38.7 (101.7) | 37.4 (99.3) | 33.4 (92.1) | 28.9 (84.0) | 21.9 (71.4) | 21.1 (70.0) | 38.7 (101.7) |
| Mean daily maximum °C (°F) | 0.6 (33.1) | 1.1 (34.0) | 7.8 (46.0) | 16.7 (62.1) | 21.1 (70.0) | 26.1 (79.0) | 29.4 (84.9) | 28.3 (82.9) | 25.6 (78.1) | 18.3 (64.9) | 10.0 (50.0) | 5.0 (41.0) | 15.8 (60.5) |
| Daily mean °C (°F) | −4.7 (23.5) | −3.6 (25.5) | 2.5 (36.5) | 10.0 (50.0) | 13.6 (56.5) | 18.1 (64.6) | 21.4 (70.5) | 19.7 (67.5) | 16.4 (61.5) | 10.0 (50.0) | 3.6 (38.5) | −0.9 (30.4) | 8.8 (47.9) |
| Mean daily minimum °C (°F) | −10.0 (14.0) | −8.3 (17.1) | −2.8 (27.0) | 3.3 (37.9) | 6.1 (43.0) | 10.0 (50.0) | 13.3 (55.9) | 11.1 (52.0) | 7.2 (45.0) | 1.7 (35.1) | −2.8 (27.0) | −6.7 (19.9) | 1.8 (35.3) |
| Record low °C (°F) | −31 (−24) | −28.6 (−19.5) | −14.8 (5.4) | −10.2 (13.6) | −5.0 (23.0) | 1.3 (34.3) | 5.4 (41.7) | 3.7 (38.7) | −3.0 (26.6) | −7.0 (19.4) | −15.9 (3.4) | −29.7 (−21.5) | −31 (−24) |
| Average precipitation mm (inches) | 42 (1.7) | 88 (3.5) | 75 (3.0) | 56 (2.2) | 34 (1.3) | 2 (0.1) | 1 (0.0) | 0 (0) | 1 (0.0) | 5 (0.2) | 35 (1.4) | 16 (0.6) | 355 (14) |
Source 1: Nomadseason,
Source 2: NASA Power (Extremes 1990-2021)

== See also ==
- Ghōr Province
