= Saraswati River =

Deified river mentioned in the Vedas and ancient Indian epics

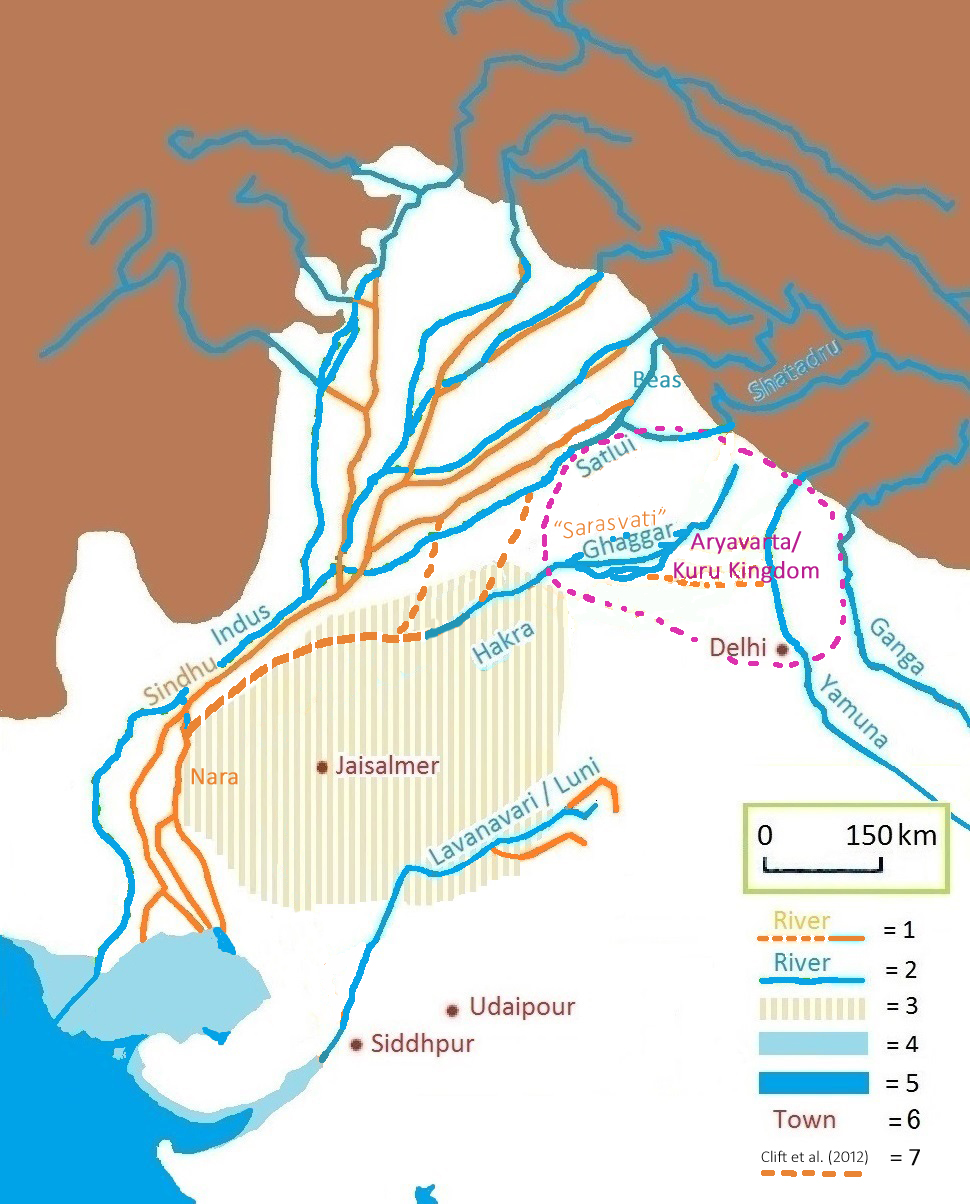
Vedic and present-day Ghaggar-Hakra river-course, with Aryavarta/Kuru kingdom, and pre-Harappan Hakra/Shutudri-Yamuna paleochannels as proposed by Clift et al. (2012) and Khonde et al. (2017). (Note: See Clift et al. (2012) map and Honde te al. (2017) map.) 1 = ancient river 2 = today's river 3 = today's Thar desert 4 = ancient shore 5 = today's shore 6 = today's town 7 = dried-up Harappan Hakra course, and pre-Harappan Sutlej paleochannels (Clift et al. (2012)).

The Saraswati River (IAST: Sárasvatī-nadī́) is a deified Rigvedic river first mentioned in the Rigveda and later in Vedic and post-Vedic texts. It played an important role in the Vedic religion, appearing in all but the fourth book of the Rigveda.

As a physical river, in the oldest texts of the Rigveda it is described as a "great and holy river in north-western India," but in the middle and late Rigvedic books, it is described as a small river ending in "a terminal lake (samudra)." (Note: Witzel (2001, p. 81): "The autochthonous theory overlooks that RV 3.33206 already speaks of a necessarily smaller Sarasvatī: the Sudås hymn 3.33 refers to the confluence of the Beas and Sutlej (Vipåś, Śutudrī). This means that the Beas had already captured the Sutlej away from the Sarasvatī, dwarfing its water supply. While the Sutlej is fed by Himalayan glaciers, the Sarsuti is but a small local river depending on rain water. In sum, the middle and later RV (books 3, 7 and the late book, 10.75) already depict the present-day situation, with the Sarasvatī having lost most of its water to the Sutlej (and even earlier, much of it also to the Yamunå). It was no longer the large river it might have been before the early Rgvedic period.") As the goddess Saraswati, the other referent for the term "Saraswati" which developed into an independent identity in post-Vedic times, the river is also described as a powerful river and mighty flood. The Saraswati is also considered by Hindus to exist in a metaphysical form, in which it formed a confluence with the sacred rivers Ganga and Yamuna, at the Triveni Sangam, as described in the Puranas. According to Michael Witzel, superimposed on the Vedic Saraswati river is the "heavenly river" of the Milky Way, which is seen as "a road to immortality and heavenly after-life."

Rigvedic and later Vedic texts have been used to propose identification with present-day rivers, or ancient riverbeds. The Nadistuti Sukta in the Rigveda (10.75) mentions the Saraswati between the Yamuna in the east and the Shutudri (now known as Sutlej) in the west, while RV 7.95.1-2, describes the Saraswati as flowing to the samudra, a word now usually translated as 'ocean', (Note: RV 7.95.1–2: "This stream Sarasvati with fostering current comes forth, our sure defence, our fort of iron. As on a chariot, the flood flows on, surpassing in majesty and might all other waters. Pure in her course from mountains to the ocean, alone of streams Sarasvati hath listened. Thinking of wealth and the great world of creatures, she poured for Nahusa her milk and fatness.") but which could also mean "lake." (Note: According to Bhargava (1964) "samudra" stands for a huge inland lake, of which there were four or seven in Rigvedic sources. He translates sagara as "ocean". In this view the "lowlands" of Kashmir and Kuruksetra were samudra, but the sea in which the Ganga fell is a sagara. See also Talageri, The Proto-Indo-European Word for "Sea/Ocean". Talageri notes that "Pāṇini gives the meaning of mīra as samudra (Uṇādi-Sutra ii, 28)," and notes that, according to Mallory, IE meer, mīra, originally referred to "lake," and not to "sea.") Later Vedic texts such as the Tandya Brahmana and the Jaiminiya Brahmana, as well as the Mahabharata, mention that the Saraswati dried up in a desert.

Since the late 19th century CE, numerous scholars have proposed to identify the Saraswati with the Ghaggar-Hakra River system, which flows through modern-day northwestern-India and eastern-Pakistan, between the Yamuna and the Sutlej, and ends in the Thar desert. Yet, recent geophysical research shows that the supposed downstream Ghaggar-Hakra paleochannel is actually a paleochannel of the Sutlej, which flowed into the Nara river, a delta channel of the Indus River, which was abandoned. 10,000–8,000 years ago when the Sutlej diverted its course, leaving the Ghaggar-Hakra as a system of monsoon-fed rivers which did not reach the sea.

The Indus Valley Civilisation prospered when the monsoons that fed the rivers diminished around 5,000 years ago, (Note: In contrast to the mainstream view, Chatterjee et al. (2019) suggest that the river remained perennial till 4,500 years ago.) and ISRO has observed that major Indus Valley Civilisation sites at Kalibangan (Rajasthan), Banawali and Rakhigarhi (Haryana), Dholavira and Lothal (Gujarat) lay along this course. (Note: Mythical Saraswati River, Press Information Bureau, Government of India, 20 March 2013.) When the monsoons that fed the rivers further diminished, the Hakra dried-up some 4,000 years ago, becoming an intermittent river, and the urban Harappan civilisation declined, becoming localized in smaller agricultural communities. (Note: Giosan et al. (2012): "Contrary to earlier assumptions that a large glacier-fed Himalayan river, identified by some with the mythical Sarasvati, watered the Harappan heartland on the interfluve between the Indus and Ganges basins, we show that only monsoonal-fed rivers were active there during the Holocene."; "Numerous speculations have advanced the idea that the Ghaggar-Hakra fluvial system, at times identified with the lost mythical river of Sarasvati (e.g., 4, 5, 7, 19), was a large glacier fed Himalayan river. Potential sources for this river include the Yamuna River, the Sutlej River, or both rivers. However, the lack of large-scale incision on the interfluve demonstrates that large, glacier-fed rivers did not flow across the Ghaggar-Hakra region during the Holocene; "The present Ghaggar-Hakra valley and its tributary rivers are currently dry or have seasonal flows. Yet rivers were undoubtedly active in this region during the Urban Harappan Phase. We recovered sandy fluvial deposits approximately 5;400 y old at Fort Abbas in Pakistan (SI Text), and recent work (33) on the upper Ghaggar-Hakra interfluve in India also documented Holocene channel sands that are approximately 4;300 y old. On the upper interfluve, fine-grained floodplain deposition continued until the end of the Late Harappan Phase, as recent as 2,900 y ago (33) (Fig. 2B). This widespread fluvial redistribution of sediment suggests that reliable monsoon rains were able to sustain perennial rivers earlier during the Holocene and explains why Harappan settlements flourished along the entire Ghaggar-Hakra system without access to a glacier-fed river."; Valdiya (2013) dispute this, arguing that it was a large perennial river draining the high mountains as late as 3700–2500 years ago. Giosan et al. (2013) have responded to, and rejected, Valdiya's arguments.)

Identification of a mighty physical Rigvedic Saraswati with the Ghaggar-Hakra system is therefore problematic, since the Ghaggar-Hakra had dried up well before the time of the composition of the Rigveda, reduced to a "small, sorry trickle in the desert." (Note: In the words of Wilke and Moebus, the Saraswati had been reduced to a "small, sorry trickle in the desert" by the time that the Vedic people migrated into north-west India. Rigvedic references to a physical river also indicate that the Saraswati "had already lost its main source of water supply and must have ended in a terminal lake (samudra) approximately 3000 years ago," "depicting the present-day situation, with the Sarasvatī having lost most of its water.") Also, Rigvedic descriptions of the Saraswati do not match the actual course of the Ghaggar-Hakra. Furthermore, it is unlikely that the most important of Rigvedic rivers would lose its Sanskrit name and be renamed in a local dialect, whereas other rivers in the area preserved their names for thousands of years.

"Saraswati" may originally have been andjective meaning "being full of water" and preserved when the Vedic people moved further eastwards. "Saraswati" has also been identified with the Helmand in ancient Arachosia, or Harauvatiš, in present day southern Afghanistan, the name of which may have been reused when the Vedic tribes moved to the Punjab. (Note: The Helmand river historically, besides Avestan Haetumant, bore the name Haraxvaiti, which is the Avestan form cognate to Sanskrit Saraswati.) The Saraswati of the Rigveda may also refer to two distinct rivers, with the family books referring to the Helmand River, and the more recent 10th mandala referring to the Ghaggar-Hakra.

The identification with the Ghaggar-Hakra system took on new significance in the early 21st century CE, with some Hindutva proponents suggesting an earlier dating of the Rigveda; renaming the Indus Valley Civilisation as the "Saraswati Culture", the "Saraswati Civilisation", the "Indus-Saraswati Civilisation" or the "Sindhu-Saraswati Civilisation," suggesting that the Indus Valley and Vedic cultures can be equated; and rejecting the Indo-Aryan migration theory, which postulates an extended period of migrations of Indo-European speaking people into the Indian subcontinent between ca. 1900 BCE and 1400 BCE. (Note: According to David Anthony, the Yamna culture was the "Urheimat" of the Indo-Europeans at the Pontic steppes. From this area, which already included various subcultures, Indo-European languages spread west, south and east starting around 4,000 BCE. These languages may have been carried by small groups of males, with patron-client systems which allowed for the inclusion of other groups into their cultural system. Eastward emerged the Sintashta culture (2100–1800 BCE), from which developed the Andronovo culture (1800–1400 BCE). This culture interacted with the BMAC (2300–1700 BCE); out of this interaction developed the Indo-Iranians, which split around 1800 BCE into the Indo-Aryans and the Iranians. The Indo-Aryans then migrated to northern India.) (Note: The migration into northern India was not a large-scale immigration, but may have consisted of small groups, which were genetically diverse. Their culture and language spread by the same mechanisms of acculturalisation, and the absorption of other groups into their patron-client system.)

== Etymology ==
Sárasvatī is the feminine nominative singular form of the adjective sárasvat (which occurs in the Rigveda as the name of the keeper of the celestial waters), derived from 'sáras' + 'vat', meaning 'having sáras-'. Sanskrit sáras- means 'lake, pond' (cf. the derivative sārasa- 'lake bird = Sarus crane'). Mayrhofer considers unlikely a connection with the root *sar- 'run, flow' but does agree that it could have been a river that connected many lakes due to its abundant volumes of water-flow.

Sárasvatī is considered to be a cognate of Avestan Harax^{v}atī. In the younger Avesta, Harax^{v}atī is Arachosia, a region described to be rich in rivers, and its Old Persian cognate Harauvati.

== Importance in Hinduism ==
The Saraswati river was revered and considered important for Hindus because it is said that it was on this river's banks, along with its tributary Drishadvati, in the Vedic state of Brahmavarta, that Vedic Sanskrit had its genesis, and important Vedic scriptures like initial part of Rigveda and several Upanishads were supposed to have been composed by Vedic seers. In the Manusmriti, Brahmavarta is portrayed as the "pure" centre of Vedic culture. Bridget and Raymond Allchin in The Rise of Civilization in India and Pakistan took the view that "The earliest Aryan homeland in India–Pakistan (Aryavarta or Brahmavarta) was in the Punjab and in the valleys of the Saraswati and Drishadvati rivers in the time of the Rigveda."

=== Rigveda ===
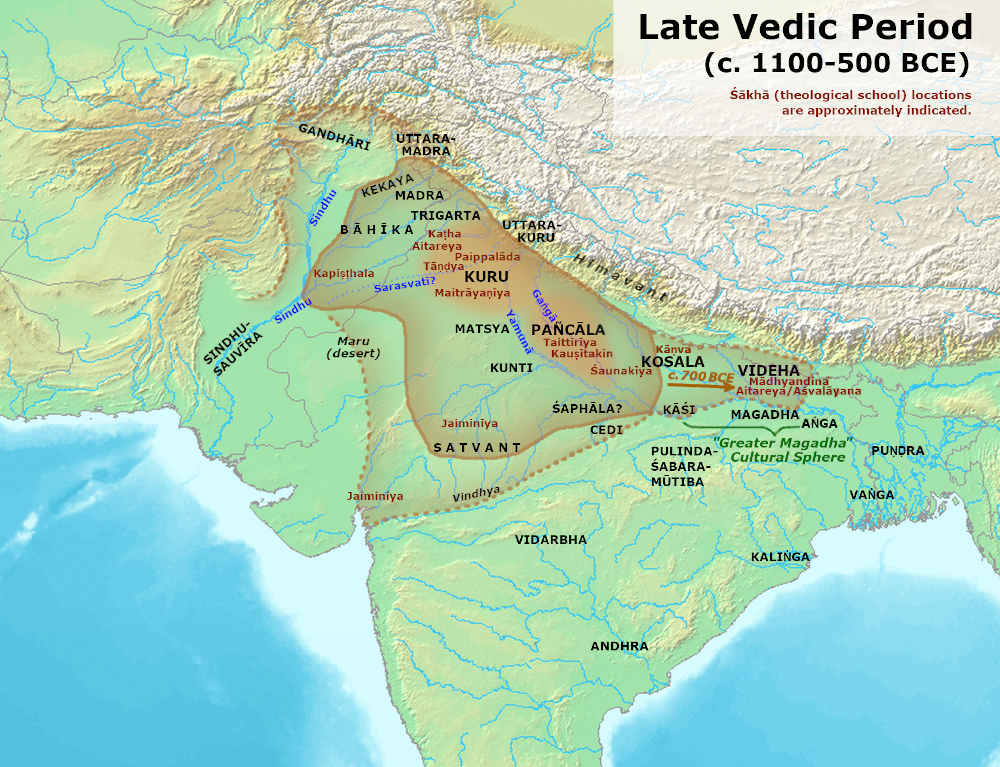
Map of northern India in the late Vedic period

==== As a river ====
The Saraswati River is mentioned in all but the fourth book of the Vedas. Macdonell and Keith provided a comprehensive survey of Vedic references to the Saraswati River in their Vedic Index. (Note: According to Shaffer, the reason for the predominance of the Saraswati in the Rigveda is the late Harappan (1900-1300 BCE) population shift eastwards to Haryana.) In the late book 10, only two references are unambiguously to the river: 10.64.9, calling for the aid of three "great rivers", Sindhu, Saraswati, Sarayu; and 10.75.5, the geographical list of the Nadistuti Sukta. In this hymn, the Saraswati River is placed between the Yamuna and the Shutudri.

In the oldest texts of the Rigveda she is described as a "great and holy river in north-western India," but Michael Witzel notes that the Rigveda indicates that the Saraswati "had already lost its main source of water supply and must have ended in a terminal lake (samudra) approximately 3000 years ago." The middle books 3 and 7 and the late books 10 "depict the present-day situation, with the Sarasvatī having lost most of its water." The Saraswati acquired an exalted status in the mythology of the Kuru kingdom, where the Rigveda was compiled.

==== As a goddess ====
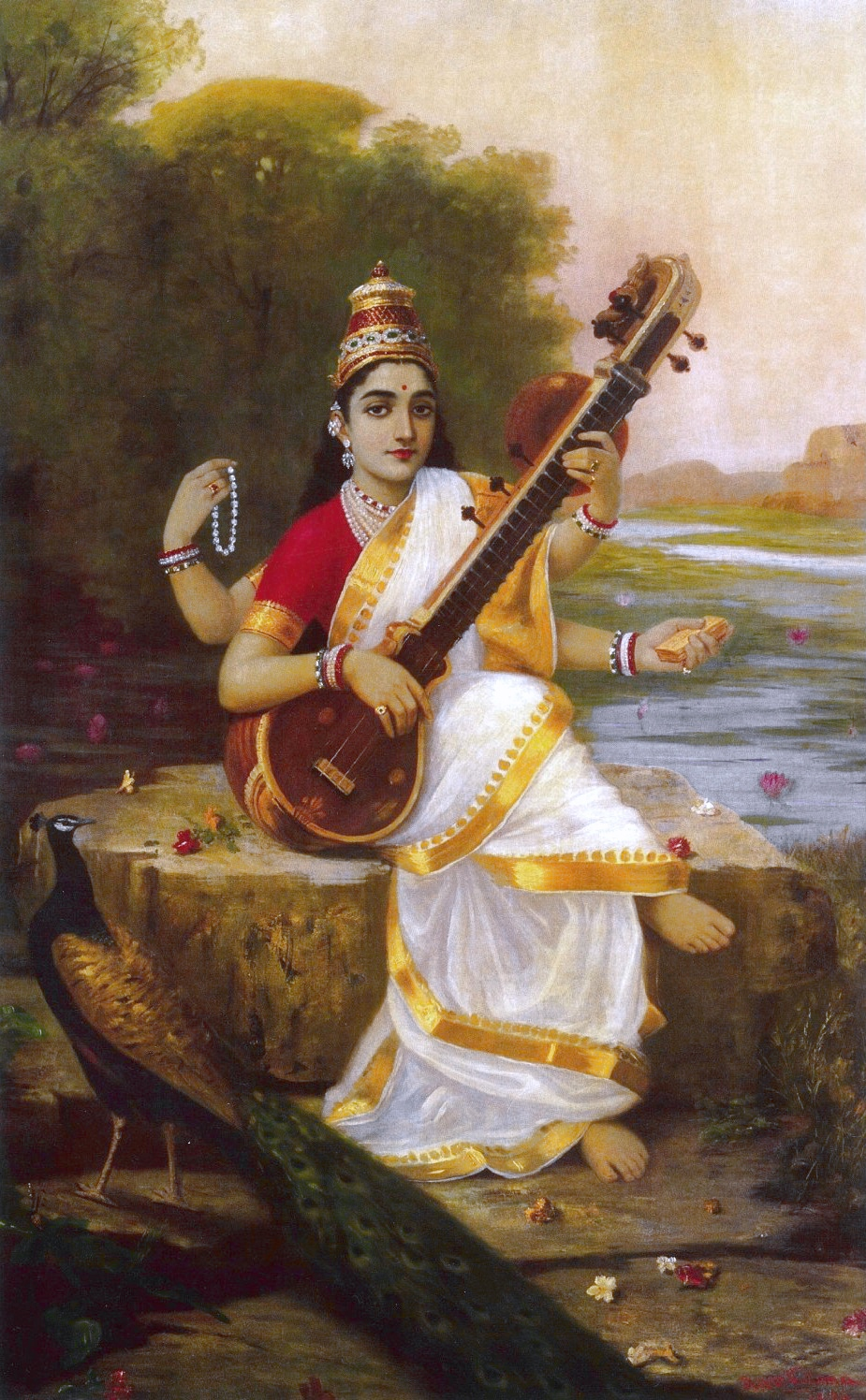
A painting of goddess Saraswati by Raja Ravi Varma

Saraswati is mentioned some fifty times in the hymns of the Rigveda. It is mentioned in thirteen hymns of the late books (1 and 10) of the Rigveda.

The most important hymns related to the goddess Saraswati are RV 6.61, RV 7.95 and RV 7.96. As a river goddess, she is described as a mighty flood, and is clearly not an earthly river. According to Michael Witzel, superimposed on the Vedic Saraswati river is the heavenly river Milky Way, which is seen as "a road to immortality and heavenly after-life." (Note: Wilke & Moebus (2011, p. 310, note 574): "Witzel suggests that Sarasvatī is not an earthly river, but the Milky Way that is seen as a road to immortality and heavenly after-life. In `mythical logic,' as outlined above, the two interpretations are not however mutually exclusive. There are passages which clearly suggest a river.") The description of the Saraswati as the river of heavens, is interpreted to suggest its mythical nature.

In 10.30.12, her origin as a river goddess may explain her invocation as a protective deity in a hymn to the celestial waters. In 10.135.5, as Indra drinks Soma, he is described as refreshed by Saraswati. The invocations in 10.17 address Saraswati as a goddess of the forefathers as well as of the present generation. In 1.13, 1.89, 10.85, 10.66 and 10.141, she is listed with other gods and goddesses, not with rivers. In 10.65, she is invoked together with "holy thoughts" (dhī) and "munificence" (puraṃdhi), consistent with her role as a goddess of both knowledge and fertility.

Though Saraswati initially emerged as a river goddess in the Vedic scriptures, in later Hinduism of the Puranas, she was rarely associated with the river. Instead, she emerged as an independent goddess of knowledge, learning, wisdom, music and the arts. The evolution of the river goddess into the goddess of knowledge started with later Brahmanas, which identified her as Vāgdevī, the goddess of speech, perhaps due to the centrality of speech in the Vedic cult and the development of the cult on the banks of the river. It is also possible to postulate two originally independent goddesses that were fused into one in later Vedic times. Aurobindo has proposed, on the other hand, that "the symbolism of the Veda betrays itself to the greatest clearness in the figure of the goddess Sarasvati ... She is, plainly and clearly, the goddess of the World, the goddess of a divine inspiration ...".

=== Other Vedic texts ===
In post-Rigvedic literature, the disappearance of the Saraswati is mentioned. Also the origin of the Saraswati is identified as Plaksa Prasravana (the pippala tree or ashvaththa tree as known in India and Nepal).

In a supplementary chapter of the Vajasaneyi-Samhita of the Yajurveda (34.11), Saraswati is mentioned in a context apparently meaning the Sindhu: "Five rivers flowing on their way speed onward to Sarasvati, but then become Sarasvati a fivefold river in the land." According to the medieval commentator Uvata, the five tributaries of the Saraswati were the Punjab rivers Drishadvati, Shutudri (Sutlej), Asikini (Chenab), Vipasha (Beas), Iravati (Ravi).

The first reference to the disappearance of the lower course of the Saraswati is from the Brahmanas, texts that are composed in Vedic Sanskrit, but dating to a later date than the Veda Samhitas. The Jaiminiya Brahmana (2.297) speaks of the 'diving under (upamajjana) of the Sarasvati', and the Tandya Brahmana (or Pancavimsa Br.) calls this the 'disappearance' (vinasana). The same text (25.10.11–16) records that the Saraswati is 'so to say meandering' (kubjimati) as it could not sustain heaven which it had propped up. (Note: See Witzel (1984) for discussion; for maps (1984) of the area, p. 42 sqq.)

The Plaksa Prasravana (place of source of the river) may refer to a spring in the Sivalik hills. The distance between the source and the Vinasana (place of disappearance of the river) is said to be 44 Ashvinas (between several hundred and 1,600 miles) (Tandya Br. 25.10.16; cf. Av. 6.131.3; Pancavimsa Br.).

In the Latyayana Srautasutra (10.15–19) the Saraswati seems to be a perennial river up to the Vinasana, which is west of its confluence with the Drshadvati (Chautang). The Drshadvati is described as a seasonal stream (10.17), meaning it was not from Himalayas. Bhargava has identified Drashadwati river as present-day Sahibi river originating from Jaipur hills in Rajasthan. The Asvalayana Srautasutra and Sankhayana Srautasutra contain verses that are similar to the Latyayana Srautasutra.

=== Post-Vedic texts ===
Wilke and Moebus note that the "historical river" Saraswati was a "topographically tangible mythogeme", which was already reduced to a "small, sorry trickle in the desert", by the time of composition of the Hindu epics. These post-Vedic texts regularly talk about drying up of the river, and start associating the goddess Saraswati with language, rather than the river.

==== Mahabharata ====
According to the Mahabharata (3rd c. BCE – 3rd c. CE) the Saraswati River dried up to a desert (at a place named Vinasana or Adarsana) and joins the sea "impetuously". MB.3.81.115 locates the state of Kurupradesh or Kuru Kingdom to the south of the Saraswati and north of the Drishadvati. The dried-up, seasonal Ghaggar River in Rajasthan and Haryana reflects the same geographical view described in the Mahabharata.

According to Hindu scriptures, a journey was made during the Mahabharata by Balrama along the banks of the Saraswati from Dwarka to Mathura. There were ancient kingdoms too (the era of the Mahajanapadas) that lay in parts of north Rajasthan and that were named on the Saraswati River.

==== Puranas ====
Several Puranas describe the Saraswati River, and also record that the river separated into a number of lakes (saras).

In the Skanda Purana, the Saraswati river originates from the water pot of Brahma and flows from Plaksa spring on the Himalayas. It then turns west at Kedara and also flows underground. Five distributaries of the Saraswati are mentioned. The texts reveal Saraswati river's goddess is Saraswati. According to the Vamana Purana 32.1–4, the Saraswati rose from the Plaksa spring.

The Padma Purana says:

One who bathes and drinks there where the Ganga, Yamuna and Sarasvati join gets liberation. Here there is no doubt."

==== Smritis ====
- In the Manu Smriti, the sage Manu, escaping from a flood, founded the Vedic culture between the Saraswati and Drishadvati rivers. The Saraswati River was thus the western boundary of Brahmavarta: "the land between the Sarasvati and Drishadvati is created by God; this land is Brahmavarta."
- Similarly, the Vasistha Dharma Sutra I.8–9 and 12–13 locates Aryavarta to the east of the disappearance of the Saraswati in the desert, to the west of Kalakavana, to the north of the mountains of Pariyatra and Vindhya and to the south of the Himalaya. Patanjali's Mahābhāṣya defines Aryavarta like the Vasistha Dharma Sutra.
- The Baudhayana Dharmasutra gives similar definitions, declaring that Aryavarta is the land that lies west of Kalakavana, east of Adarsana (where the Saraswati disappears in the desert), south of the Himalayas and north of the Vindhyas.

=== Contemporary religious significance ===
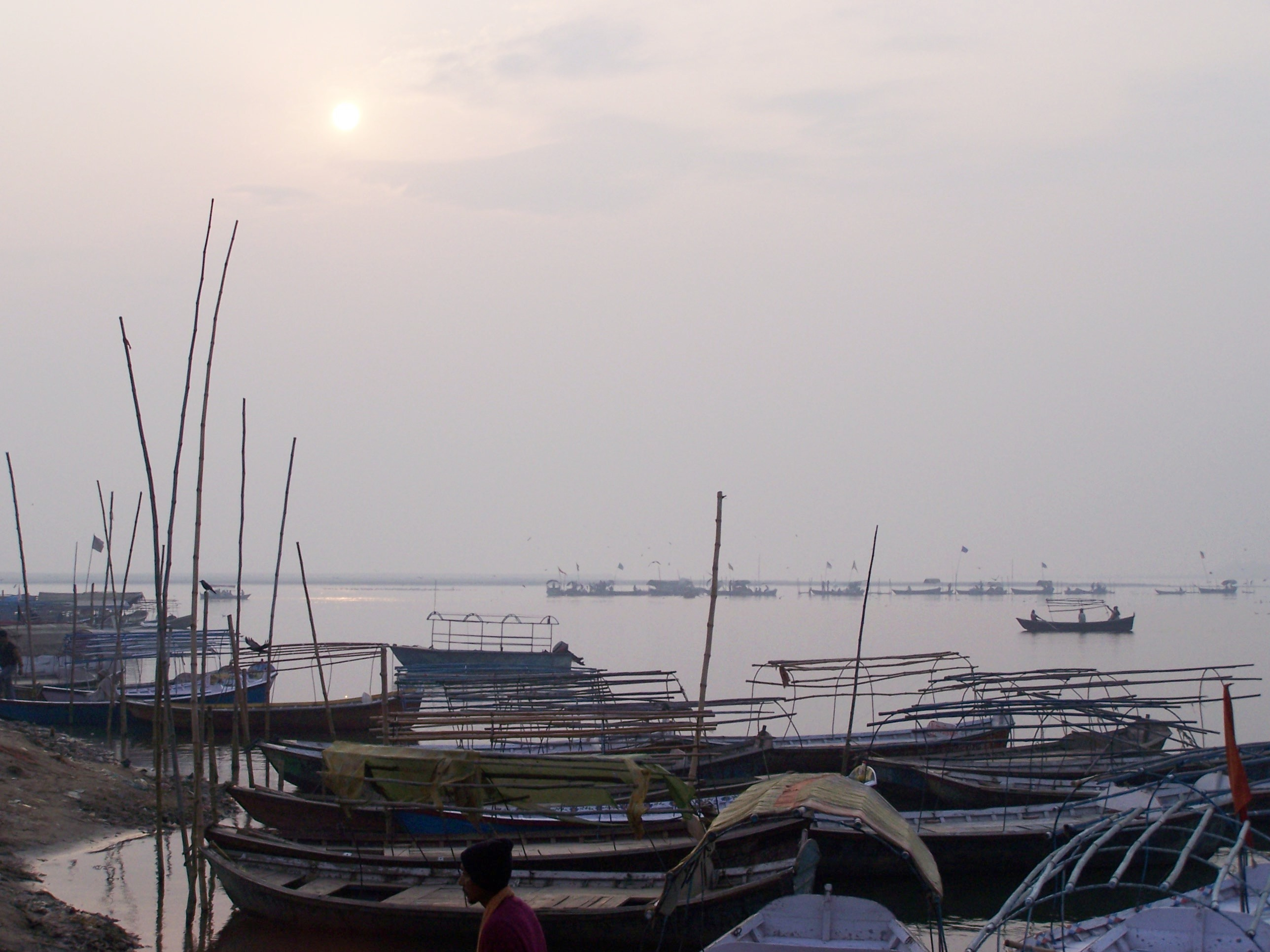
Triveni Sangam, Prayagraj: The confluence of Ganges and Yamuna. Hindus believe that the mythical Saraswati also converges here.

Diana Eck notes that the power and significance of the Saraswati for present-day Indian subcontinent is in the persistent symbolic presence at the confluence of rivers all over Indian subcontinent. Although underground, it is the third river, which emerges to join in the meeting of rivers, thus making the waters holy.

After the Vedic Saraswati dried, new myths about the rivers arose. Saraswati is described to flow in the underworld and rise to the surface at some places. For centuries, the Saraswati river existed in a "subtle or mythic" form, since it corresponds with none of the major rivers of present-day South Asia. Many Hindus believe that the joining of the Ganges and Yamuna rivers at Triveni Sangam, Prayagraj, also converges with the unseen Saraswati river, which is believed to flow underground. This is despite Prayagraj being at a large distance from the historic route of Saraswati river as an underground river flowing east. The belief of the Saraswati joining at the confluence of the Ganges and Yamuna originates from Puranic scriptures and denotes the "powerful legacy" the Vedic river left after her supposed disappearance. The belief is interpreted as "symbolic". The rivers Saraswati, Yamuna, Ganga are believed to be companions of Brahma, Vishnu, Shiva respectively. In lesser known configuration, Saraswati is said to form the Triveni confluence with rivers Hiranya and Kapila near Somnath temple. There are several other Trivenis in India where two physical rivers are joined by the "unseen" Saraswati, which adds to the sanctity of the confluence.

Historian Romila Thapar notes that "once the river had been mythologised through invoking the memory of the earlier river, its name—Sarasvati—could be applied to many rivers, which is what happened in various parts of the Indian Subcontinent."

Several present-day rivers are also named Saraswati, after the Vedic Saraswati:

- Saraswati is the present-day name of a river originating in a submontane region (Ambala district) and joining the Ghaggar near Shatrana in Punjab. Near Sadulgarh (Hanumangarh) the Naiwala channel, a dried out channel of the Sutlej, joins the Ghaggar-Hakra River. Near Suratgarh, the Ghaggar is then joined by the dried up Drishadvati River.
- Saraswati is the name of a river originating in the Aravalli mountain range in Rajasthan, passing through Siddhpur and Patan before submerging in the Rann of Kutch.
- Saraswati River (Uttarakhand), a tributary of Alaknanda River, originates near Badrinath.
- Saraswati River (West Bengal) in West Bengal, formerly a distributary of the Hooghly River, has dried up since the 17th-century CE.

== Identification theories ==
Since the 19th century CE, numerous attempts have been made to identify the mythical river Saraswati of the Vedas with physical rivers. Many think that the Vedic Saraswati once flowed east of the Indus (Sindhu) river. Scientists, geologists as well as scholars have identified the Saraswati with many present-day or now-defunct rivers.

Two theories are popular in the attempts to identify the Saraswati. Several scholars have identified the river with the present-day Ghaggar-Hakra River or dried up part of it, which is located in modern-day Northwestern India and Pakistan. A second popular theory associates the river with the Helmand River or an ancient river in the present Helmand Valley in Afghanistan.

The identification with the Ghaggar-Hakra system took on new significance in the early 21st century, suggesting an earlier dating of the Rigveda, and renaming the Indus Valley Civilisation as the "Saraswati culture", the "Saraswati Civilisation", the "Indus-Saraswati Civilisation" or the "Sindhu-Saraswati Civilisation," suggesting that the Indus Valley and Vedic cultures can be equated.

=== Rigvedic course ===
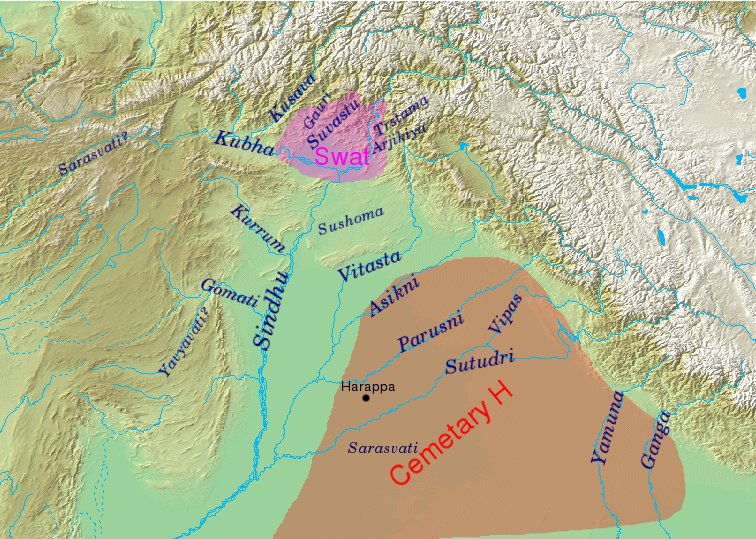
Vedic rivers

The Rigveda contains several hymns which give an indication of the flow of the geography of the river, and an identification of the Saraswati, as also described in the later books of the Vedas.

Identifications in the Rigveda connecting the Saraswati with the Ghaggra-Hakra river:

- RV 3.23.4 mentions the Saraswati River together with the Drishadvati River and the Āpayā River.
- RV 6.52.6 describes the Saraswati as swollen (pinvamānā) by the rivers (sindhubhih).
- RV 7.36.6, "sárasvatī saptáthī síndhumātā" can be translated as "Sarasvati the Seventh, Mother of Floods," but also as "whose mother is the Sindhu", which would indicate that the Saraswati is here a tributary of the Indus. (Note: While the first translation takes a tatpurusha interpretation of síndhumātā, the word is actually a bahuvrihi. Hans Hock (1999) translates síndhumātā as a bahuvrihi, giving the second translation. A translation as a tatpurusha ("mother of rivers", with sindhu still with its generic meaning) would be less common in RV speech.)
- RV 7.95.1–2, describes the Saraswati as flowing to the samudra, a word now usually translated as "ocean," but which could also mean "lake."
- RV 10.75.5, the late Rigvedic Nadistuti Sukta, enumerates all important rivers from the Ganges in the east up to the Indus in the west in a clear geographical order. The sequence "Ganges, Yamuna, Sarasvati, Shutudri" places the Saraswati between the Yamuna and the Sutlej, which is consistent with the Ghaggar identification.

Yet, the Rigveda also contains clues for an identification with the Helmand river in Afghanistan:

- The Saraswati River is perceived to be a great river with perennial water, which does not apply to the Hakra and Ghaggar.
- The Rigveda seems to contain descriptions of several Saraswatis. The earliest Saraswati is said to be similar to the Helmand in Afghanistan which is called the Harakhwati in the Āvestā.
- Verses in RV 6.61 indicate that the Saraswati river originated in the hills or mountains (giri), where she "burst with her strong waves the ridges of the hills (giri)". It is a matter of interpretation whether this refers only to the Himalayan foothills, where the present-day Saraswati (Sarsuti) river flows, or to higher mountains.

Cemetery H, Late Harappan, OCP, Copper Hoard and Painted Grey ware sites in the area of Aryavarta and the riverbed of the Ghaggar-Hakra.

The Rigveda was composed during the latter part of the late Harappan period, and according to Shaffer, the reason for the predominance of the Saraswati in the Rigveda is the late Harappan (1900-1300 BCE) population shift eastwards to Haryana.

=== Ghaggar-Hakra River ===
The present Ghaggar-Hakra River is a seasonal river in India and Pakistan that flows only during the monsoon season, but satellite images in possession of the ISRO and ONGC have confirmed that the major course of a river ran through the present-day Ghaggar River. The supposed paleochannel of the Hakra is actually a paleochannel of the Sutlej, flowing into the Nara river bed, presently a delta channel c.q. paleochannel of the Indus River. At least 10,000 years ago, well before the rise of the Harappan civilization, the sutlej diverted its course, leaving the Ghaggar-Hakra as a monsoon-fed river. Early in the 2nd millennium BCE the monsoons diminished and the Ghaggar-Hakra fluvial system dried up, which affected the Harappan civilisation.

==== Paleochannels and ancient course ====
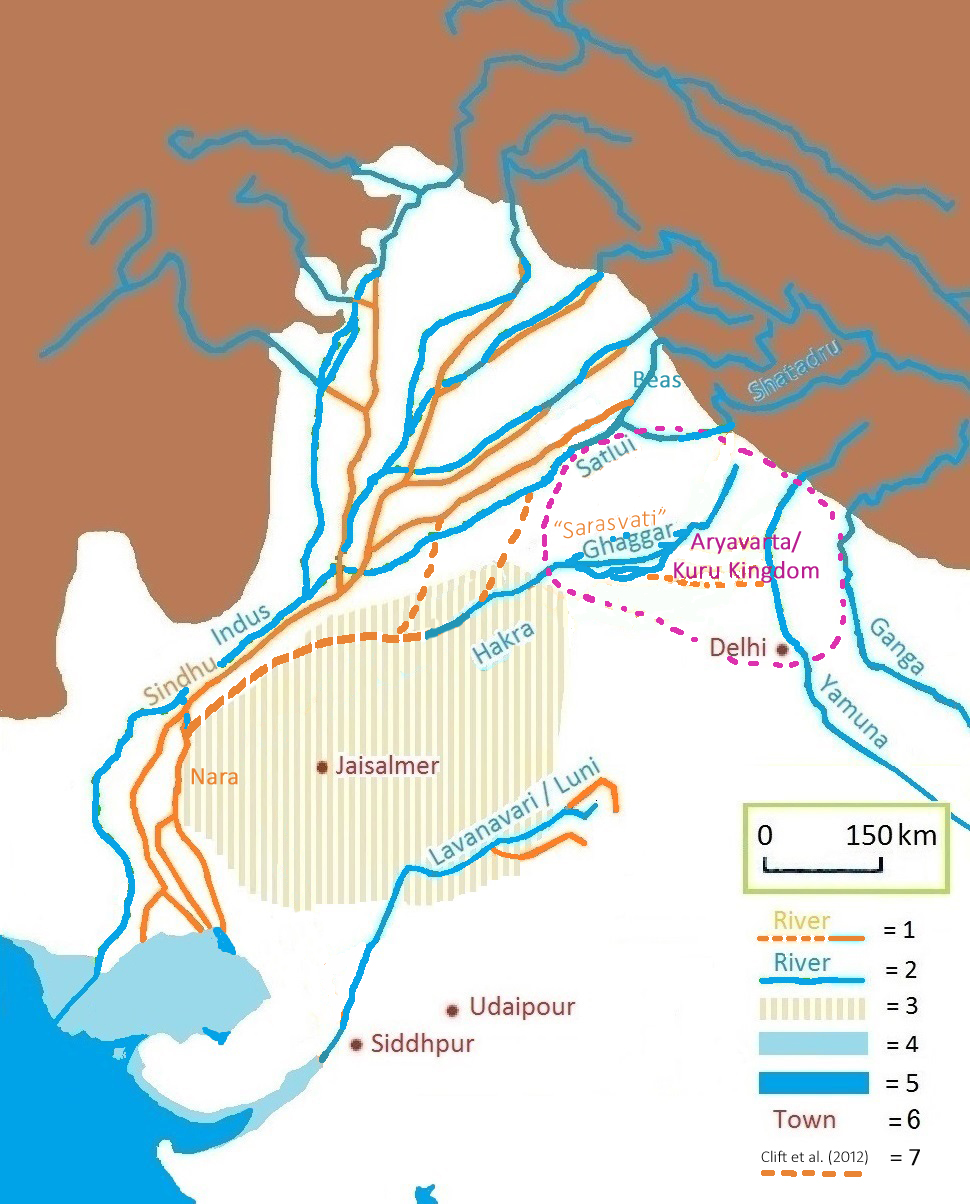
Vedic and present-day Gagghar-Hakra river-course, with Aryavarta/Kuru Kingdom, and (pre-)Harappan Hakra/Sutlej-Yamuna paleochannels, as proposed by Clift et al. (2012) and Khonde et al. (2017). (Note: See Clift et al. (2012) map and Honde te al. (2017) map.) 1 = ancient river 2 = today's river 3 = today's Thar desert 4 = ancient shore 5 = today's shore 6 = today's town 7 = dried-up Harappan Hakkra course, and pre-Harappan Sutlej paleochannels (Clift et al. (2012))

While there is general agreement that the river courses in the Indus Basin have frequently changed course, the exact sequence of these changes and their dating have been problematic.

===== Pre-Holocene diversion of the Sutlej and Yamuna =====
Older publications have suggested that the Sutlej and the Yamuna drained into the Hakra well into Mature Harappan times, providing ample volume to the supply provided by the monsoon-fed Ghaggar. The Sutlej and Yamuna then changed course between 2500 BCE and 1900 BCE, due to either tectonic events or "slightly altered gradients on the extremely flat plains," resulting in the drying-up of the Hakra in the Thar Desert. (Note: The suggestion of a change of river courses during Mature Harappan times due to tectonic activity has been used by Indigenists to argue for the identification of the Ghaggar-Hakra with the Vedic Saraswati. Gupta (1995), The lost Saraswati and the Indus Civilization, makes ample reference to such suggestions: According to Misra, as cited in Gupta (1995, pp. 149–50), there are several dried out river beds (paleochannels) between the Sutlej and the Yamuna, some of them two to ten kilometres wide. They are not always visible on the ground because of excessive silting and encroachment by sand of the dried out river channels.; Raikes (1968) and Suraj Bhan (1972, 1973, 1975, 1977), as cited in Gupta (1995, p. 149), have argued, based on archaeological, geomorphic and sedimentological research, that the Yamuna may have flowed into the Saraswati during Harappan times.; According to Misra, as cited in Gupta (1995, p. 153), the Yamuna may have flowed into the Saraswati river through the Chautang or the Drishadvati channel, since many Harappan sites have been discovered on these dried-out river beds. There are no Harappan sites on the present Yamuna river, but there are, however, Painted Gray Ware (1000–600 BC) sites along the Yamuna channel, showing that the river must then have flowed in the present channel.; Other Indigenist Aryanism-cloroued publications include: According to Gupta (1999), there are no Harappan sites on the Sutlej in its present lower course, only in its upper course near the Siwaliks, and along the dried up channel of the ancient Sutlej.; According to Pal (1984, p. 494), also cited in Bryant (2001), the course of the Sutlej suggests that "the Satluj periodically was the main tributary of the Ghaggar and that subsequently the tectonic movements may have forced the Satluj westward and the Ghaggar dried." At Ropar the Sutlej river suddenly turns sharply away from the Ghaggar. The narrow Ghaggar river bed itself is becoming suddenly wider at the conjunction where the Sutlej should have met the Ghaggar river. There also is a major paleochannel between the turning point of the Sutlej and where the Ghaggar river bed widens.; According to Lal (2002, p. 24), who supports the Indigenous Aryans theory, the disappearance of the river may additionally have been caused by earthquakes which may have led to the redirection of its tributaries.; Mitra & Bhadu (2012), referring to three other publications, state that active faults are present in the region, and lateral and vertical tectonic movements have frequently diverted streams in the past. The Ghaggar-Hakra may have migrated westward due to such uplift of the Aravallis.; Puri & Verma (1998) argue that the present-day Tons River was the ancient upper-part of the Ghaggar-Hakra river, identified with the Saraswati river by them. The Ghaggar-Hakra would then had been fed with Himalayan glaciers, which would make it the mighty river described in the Vedas. The terrain of this river contains pebbles of quartzite and metamorphic rocks, while the lower terraces in these valleys do not contain such rocks. A major seismic activity in the Himalayan region caused the rising of the Bata-Markanda Divide. This resulted in the blockage of the westward flow of Ghaggar-Hakra forcing the water back. Since the Yamunā Tear opening was not far off, the blocked water exited from the opening into the Yamunā system.) (Note: Anthropologists Gregory Possehl (1942–2011) and J. M. Kenoyer, writing in the 1990s, have suggested that many religious and literary invocations to Saraswati in the Rig Veda were to a real Himalayan river, whose waters, on account of seismic events, were diverted, leaving only a seasonal river, the Ghaggar-Hakra, in the original river bed. Archaeologists Gregory Possehl and Jane McIntosh refer to the Ghaggar-Hakra river as "Sarasvati" throughout their respective 2002 and 2008 books on the Indus Civilisation, supposing that the Sutlej and Yamuna diverged their courses during late Harappan times.) (Note: Chatterjee et al. (2019) identify the Saraswati with the Ghaggar, arguing that during "9–4.5 ka the river was perennial and was receiving sediments from the Higher and Lesser Himalayas" by distributaries of the Sutlej, which "likely facilitated development of the early Harappan settlements along its banks." In response, Sinha et al. (2020) state that "most workers have documented the cessation of large scale fluvial activity in NW India in early Holocene, thereby refuting the sustenance of the Harappan civilization by a large river.") More recent publications have shown that the Sutlej and the Yamuna shifted course well before Harappan times, leaving the monsoon-fed Ghaggar-Hakra which dried-up during late Harappan times.

Clift et al. (2012), using dating of zircon sand grains, have shown that subsurface river channels near the Indus Valley Civilisation sites in Cholistan immediately below the presumed Ghaggar-Hakra channel show sediment affinity not with the Ghagger-Hakra, but instead with the Beas River in the western sites and the Sutlej and the Yamuna in the eastern ones. This suggests that the Yamuna itself, or a channel of the Yamuna, along with a channel of the Sutlej may have flowed west some time between 47,000 BCE and 10,000 BCE. The drainage from the Yamuna may have been lost from the Ghaggar-Hakra well before the beginnings of Indus civilisation.

Ajit Singh et al. (2017) show that the paleochannel of the Ghaggar-Hakra is a former course of the Sutlej, which diverted to its present course between 15,000 and 8,000 years ago, well before the development of the Harappan Civilisation. Ajit Singh et al. conclude that the urban populations settled not along a perennial river, but a monsoon-fed seasonal river that was not subject to devastating floods.

Khonde et al. (2017) confirm that the Great Rann of Kutch received sediments from a different source than the Indus, but this source stopped supplying sediments after ca. 10,000 years ago. Likewise, Dave et al. (2019) state that "[o]ur results disprove the proposed link between ancient settlements and large rivers from the Himalayas and indicate that the major palaeo-fluvial system traversing through this region ceased long before the establishment of the Harappan civilisation."

According to Chaudhri et al. (2021) "the Sarasvati River used to flow from the glaciated peaks of the Himalaya to the Arabian sea," and an "enormous amount of water was flowing through this channel network until BCE 11,147." This study suggests that the Saraswati was initially glacier-fed, weakened as glaciers shrank after 4000 BCE, relied mostly on rain until around 2000 years ago, and fully dried up by 1402 CE.

===== IVC and diminishing of the monsoons =====
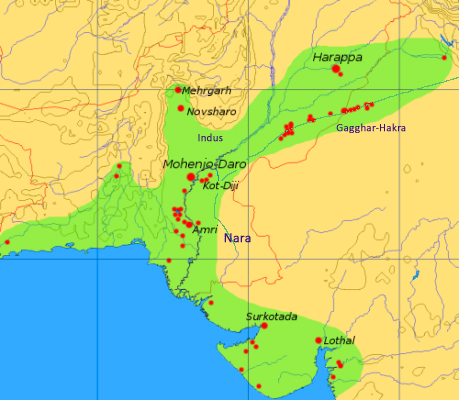
Outline of the Indus Civilization, with concentration of settlements along the Ghaggar-Hakra, which had dried-up by the time of the Indo-Aryan migrations. See Sameer et al. (2018) for a more detailed map.

Many Indus Valley Civilisation (Harrapan Civilisation) sites are found on the banks of and in the proximity of the Ghaggar-Hakra fluvial system, due to the "high monsoon rainfall" which fed the Ghaggar-Hakra in Mature Harappan Times.

Giosan et al., in their study Fluvial landscapes of the Harappan civilisation, make clear that the Ghaggar-Hakra fluvial system was not a large glacier-fed Himalayan river, but a monsoonal-fed river. They concluded that the Indus Valley Civilisation prospered when the monsoons that fed the rivers diminished around 5,000 years ago. When the monsoons, which fed the rivers that supported the civilisation, further diminished and the rivers dried out as a result, the IVC declined some 4000 years ago. This in particular effected the Ghaggar-Hakra system, which became an intermittent river and was largely abandoned. Localized Late IVC-settlements are found eastwards, toward the more humid regions of the Indo-Gangetic Plain, where the decentralised late Harappan phase took place. (Note: Painted Grey Ware sites (ca. 1000 BCE) have been found in the bed and not on the banks of the Ghaggar-Hakra river, suggesting that the river had dried up before this period.)

The same widespread aridification in the third millennium BCE also led to water shortages and ecological changes in the Eurasian steppes, (Note: Rajesh Kochhar (2017), "The Aryan chromosome", The Indian Express) leading to a change of vegetation, triggering "higher mobility and transition to nomadic cattle breeding," (Note: Demkina et al. (2017): "In the second millennium BC, humidification of the climate led to the divergence of the soil cover with secondary formation of the complexes of chestnut soils and solonetzes. This paleoecological crisis had a significant effect on the economy of the tribes in the Late Catacomb and Post-Catacomb time stipulating their higher mobility and transition to the nomadic cattle breeding.") (Note: See also Eurogenes Blogspot, The crisis.) These migrations eventually resulted in the Indo-Aryan migrations into South Asia.

==== Identification with the Saraswati ====
A number of archaeologists and geologists have identified the Saraswati river with the present-day Ghaggar-Hakra River, or the dried up part of it, despite the fact that it had already dried-up and become a small seasonal river before Vedic times.

In the 19th and 20th centuries, a number of Indologists, scholars, archaeologists, and geologists identified the Vedic Saraswati River with the Ghaggar-Hakra River, such as Christian Lassen (1800-1876), Max Müller (1823-1900), Marc Aurel Stein (1862–1943), C. F. Oldham and Jane McIntosh.

Recent archaeologists and geologists that have identified the Saraswati with the Ghaggar include Philip and Virdi (2006) and K.S. Valdiya (2013). According to Gregory Possehl, "Linguistic, archaeological, and historical data show that the Saraswati of the Vedas is the modern Ghaggar or Hakra."

According to R.U.S. Prasad, "we [...] find a considerable body of opinions [sic] among the scholars, archaeologists and geologists, who hold that the Sarasvati originated in the Sivalik hills [...] and descended through Adi Badri, situated in the foothills of the Shivaliks, to the plains [...] and finally debouched herself into the Arabian sea at the Rann of Kutch." According to Valdiya, "it is plausible to conclude that once upon a time the Ghagghar was known as "Sarsutī"," which is "a corruption of "Sarasvati"," because "at Sirsā on the bank of the Ghagghar stands a fortress called "Sarsutī". Now in derelict condition, this fortress of antiquity celebrates and honours the river Sarsutī."

==== Textual and historical objections ====
Ashoke Mukherjee (2001) is critical of the attempts to identify the Rigvedic Saraswati. Mukherjee notes the peculiarity that rivers like the Indus (Sindu) preserved their name for thousands of years, and a number of Indian rivers have been named Sarasvati, reflecting the religious significance of this river, yet "the original Sarasvati [was renamed] into a desanscritized drab title of local dialect?" Mukherjee further notes that many historians and archaeologists, both Indian and foreign, noted that the word "Sarasvati" (literally "being full of water") is not a noun, a specific "thing," and concluded that "Sarasvati" is initially used by the Rigvedic people as an adjective to the Indus as a large river and later evolved into a "noun." The popular memory of a mighty may have developed into a myth when the Vedic people migrated further eastwards. Mukherjee concludes that the Vedic poets had not seen the palaeo-Saraswati, and that what they described in the Vedic verses refers to something else. He also suggests that in the post-Vedic and Puranic tradition the "disappearance" of Saraswati, which to refers to "[going] under [the] ground in the sands", was created as a complementary myth to explain the visible non-existence of the river.

Romila Thapar terms the identification controversial and dismisses it, noticing that the descriptions of Saraswati flowing through the high mountains does not tally with Ghaggar's course and suggests that Saraswati is Haraxvati of Afghanistan. Wilke and Moebus suggest that the identification is problematic since the Ghaggar-Hakra river was already dried up at the time of the composition of the Vedas, let alone the migration of the Vedic people into northern India.

Rajesh Kocchar further notes that, even if the Sutlej and the Yamuna had drained into the Ghaggar during Rigvedic, it still would not fit the Rigvedic descriptions because "the snow-fed Satluj and Yamuna would strengthen lower Ghaggar. Upper Ghaggar would still be as puny as it is today."

=== Helmand river ===
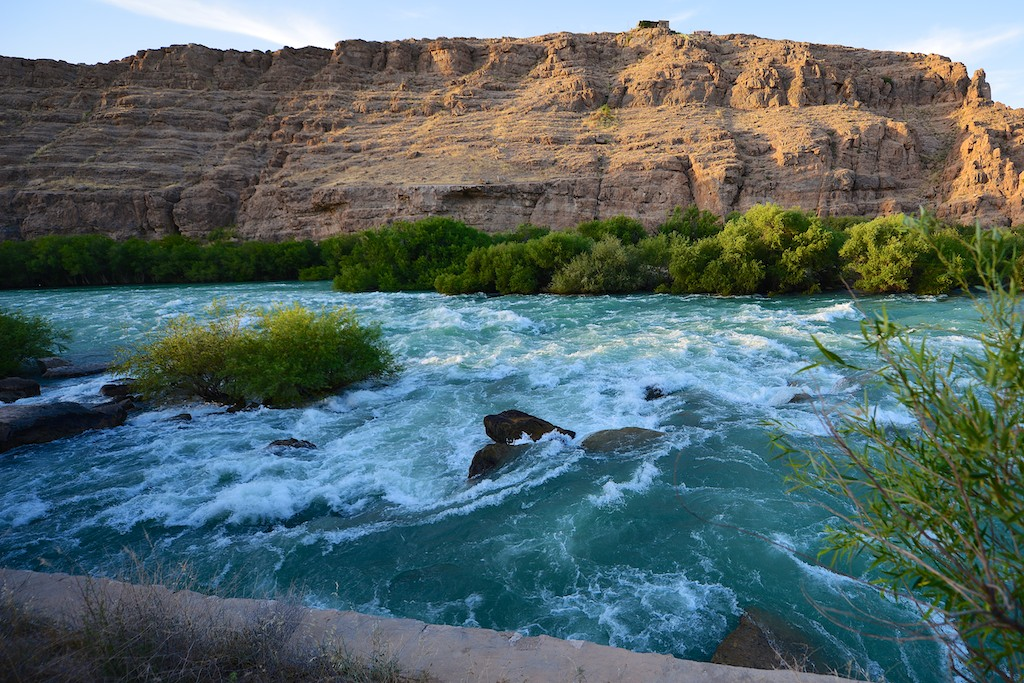
The Helmand River, Afghanistan, known in ancient Iranian Avestan as Harahvaiti, is identified by some as the ancient Saraswati river.

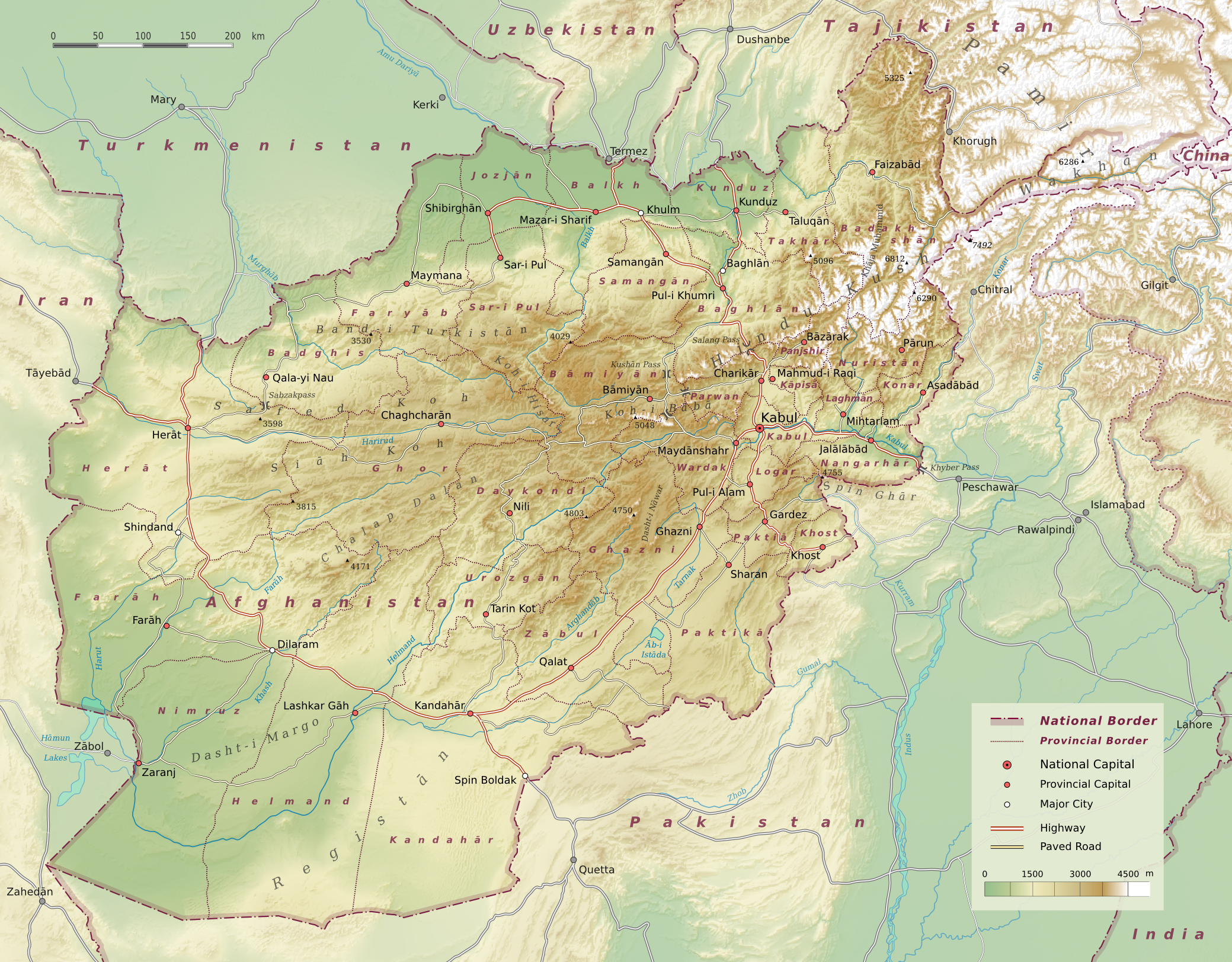
Helmand river basin with tributary Arghandab River originates in Hindu Kush mountain in north Afghanistan and falls in to Hamun Lake in southern Afghanistan at the border of Iran.

An alternative suggestion for the identity of the early Rigvedic Saraswati River is the Helmand River and its tributary Arghandab River in the Arachosia region in Afghanistan, separated from the watershed of the Indus by the Sanglakh Range. The Helmand historically besides Avestan Haetumant bore the name Haraxvaiti, which is the Avestan form cognate to Sanskrit Saraswati. The Avesta extols the Helmand in similar terms to those used in the Rigveda with respect to the Saraswati: "The bountiful, glorious Haetumant swelling its white waves rolling down its copious flood". However unlike the Rigvedic Saraswati, Helmand river never attained the status of a deity despite the praises in the Avesta. The identification of the Saraswati river with the Helmand river was first proposed by Thomas (1886), followed by Alfred Hillebrandt a couple of years thereafter.

According to Konrad Klaus (1989), the geographic situation of the Saraswati and the Helmand rivers are similar. Both flow into terminal lakes: The Helmand flows into a swamp on the Iranian plateau (the extended wetland and lake system of Hamun-i-Helmand). This matches the Rigvedic description of the Saraswati flowing to the samudra, which according to him at that time meant 'confluence', 'lake', 'heavenly lake', 'ocean'; the current meaning of 'terrestrial ocean' was not even felt in the Pali Canon.

Rajesh Kocchar (1999), after a detailed analysis of the Vedic texts and the geological environments of the rivers, concludes that there may be two Saraswati rivers mentioned in the Rigveda. The early Rigvedic Saraswati, which he calls Naditama Saraswati, is described in Suktas 2.41, 7.36, etc. of the family books of the Rigveda, and drains into a samudra. However, according to Rajesh, the description of the Naditama Saraswati in the Rigveda indicates that any long river which flows from the mountains to the sea, receiving tributaries along the way, can fit the general description of the Saraswati River. Rajesh presents arguments in his work that the Helmand River in Afghanistan could be identified with the earlier Saraswati River, citing reasons such as similarities between the description of Saraswati in the Rigveda and the description of the Helmand, also known as Haetumant, in the Avesta. Rajesh further rejects the identification of the older Saraswati with the Ghaggar, citing that western archaeological sites in Sind are older than eastern archaeological sites of the Ghaggar, suggesting an eastward migration of the bearers of the Rigvedic culture to the western Ganga plain. According to him, the Saraswati by this time had become an underground river, and the name was transferred to the Ghaggar, which disappeared in the desert. Rajesh Kocchar, however, believes that the name of the river 'Harut' is traced to 'Harauvaiti' (the name for the region of Arachosia, not a river), and Harut is not actually a part of Arachosia but of Drangiana. The later Rigvedic Saraswati, which he calls Vinasana Saraswati, is described in the Rigvedic Nadistuti Sukta (10.75). The later Rigvedic Saraswati is only in the post-Rigvedic Brahmanas said to disappear in the sands. According to Kocchar, the Ganga and Yamuna were small streams in the vicinity of the Harut River. When the Vedic people moved east into Punjab, they named the new rivers they encountered after the old rivers they knew from Helmand, and the Vinasana Saraswati may correspond with the Ghaggar-Hakra River.

Romila Thapar (2004) declares the identification of the Ghaggar with the Saraswati controversial. Furthermore, the early references to the Saraswati could be the Haraxvati plain in Afghanistan. The identification with the Ghaggar is problematic, as the Saraswati is said to cut its way through high mountains, which is not the landscape of the Ghaggar.

=== Contemporary politico-religious meaning ===
The Vedic description of the goddess Saraswati as a mighty river, and the Vedic and Puranic statements about the drying-up and diving-under of the Saraswati, have been used by some as a reference point for historical revisionism of the Vedic culture. Some see these descriptions as a mighty river as evidence for an earlier dating of the Rigveda, identifying the Vedic culture with the Harappan culture, which flourished at the time that the Gaggar-Hakra had not dried up, and rejecting the Indo-Aryan migrations theory, which postulates a migration at 1500 BCE.

The Indus Valley Civilisation is sometimes called the "Saraswati Culture", "Saraswati Civilization", "Indus-Saraswati Civilization" or "Sindhu-Saraswati Civilization" by Hindutva revisionists subscribing to the theory of Indigenous Aryanism. The terms refer to the Saraswati river mentioned in the Vedas, and equate the Vedic culture with the Indus Valley Civilisation. In this view, the Harappan civilisation flourished predominantly on the banks of the Ghaggar-Hakra, not the Indus. For example, Michel Danino notes that his proposed dating of the Vedas to the third millennium BCE coincides with the mature phase of the Indus Valley civilisation, and that it is "tempting" to equate the Indus Valley and Vedic cultures.

Danino places the composition of the Vedas therefore in the third millennium BCE, a millennium earlier than the conventional dates. Danino notes that accepting the Rigveda accounts as a mighty river as factual descriptions, and dating the drying up late in the third millennium, are incompatible. According to Danino, this suggests that the Vedic people were present in northern India in the third millennium BCE, a conclusion which is controversial amongst professional archaeologists. (Note: Witzel: "If the RV is to be located in the Panjab, and supposedly to be dated well before the supposed 1900 BCE drying up of the Sarasvatī, at 4000–5000 BCE (Kak 1994, Misra 1992), the text should not contain evidence of the domesticated horse (not found in the subcontinent before c. 1700 BCE, see Meadow 1997,1998, Anreiter 1998: 675 sqq.), of the horse-drawn chariot (developed only about 2000 BCE in S. Russia, Anthony and Vinogradov 1995, or Mesopotamia), of well developed copper/bronze technology, etc.") Danino states that there is an absence of "any intrusive material culture in the Northwest during the second millennium BCE," (Note: Michael Witzel points out that this is to expected from a mobile society, but that the Gandhara grave culture is a clear indication of new cultural elements. Michaels points out that there are linguistic and archaeological data that shows a cultural change after 1750 BCE, and Flood notices that the linguistic and religious data clearly show links with Indo-European languages and religion.) a biological continuity in the skeletal remains, and a cultural continuity. Danino then states that if the "testimony of the Sarasvati is added to this, the simplest and most natural conclusion is that the Vedic culture was present in the region in the third millennium."

Danino acknowledges that this asks for "studying its tentacular ramifications into linguistics, archaeoastronomy, anthropology and genetics, besides a few other fields."

Romila Thapar points out that an alleged equation of the Indus Valley civilization and the carriers of Vedic culture stays in stark contrast to not only linguistic, but also archeological evidence. She notes that the essential characteristics of Indus valley urbanism, such as planned cities, complex fortifications, elaborate drainage systems, the use of mud and fire bricks, monumental buildings, extensive craft activity, are completely absent in the Rigveda. Similarly the Rigveda lacks a conceptual familiarity with key aspects of organized urban life (e.g. non-kin labour, facets or items of an exchange system or complex weights and measures) and doesn't mention objects found in great numbers at Indus Valley civilization sites like terracotta figurines, sculptural representation of human bodies or seals.

Hetalben Sindhav notes that claims of a large number of Ghaggar-Hakra sites are politically motivated and exaggerated. While the Indus remained an active river, the Ghaggar-Hakra dried-up, leaving many sites undisturbed. Sidhav further notes that the Ghaggar-Hakra was a tributary of the Indus, so the proposed Saraswati nomenclatura is redundant. According to archaeologist Shereen Ratnagar, many Ghaggar-Hakra sites in India are actually those of local cultures; some sites display contact with Harappan civilization, but only a few are fully developed Harappan ones. Moreover, around 90% of the Indus script seals and inscribed objects discovered were found at sites in Pakistan along the Indus river, while other places accounting only for the remaining 10%. (Note: Number of Indus script inscribed objects and seals obtained from various Harappan sites: Mohanjodaro (1540), Harappa (985), Chanhudaro (66), Lothal (165), Kalibangan (99), Banawali (7), Ur, Iraq (6), Surkotada (5), Chandigarh (4))

==== Revival ====
In 2015, Reuters reported that "members of the Rashtriya Swayamsevak Sangh know that proof of the physical existence of the Vedic river would bolster their concept of a golden age of Hindu Indian Subcontinent." The Bharatiya Janata Party Government had therefore ordered archaeologists to search for the river.

According to the government of Indian state of Haryana, research and satellite imagery of the region has confirmed to have found the lost river when water was detected during digging of the dry river bed at Yamunanagar. According to Bhadra et al. (2009), surveys and satellite photographs confirm that there was once a great river that rose in the Himalayas, entered the plains of Haryana, flowed through the Thar-Cholistan desert of Rajasthan and eastern Sindh (running roughly parallel to the Indus) and then reached the sea in the Rann of Kutch in Gujarat, with the strange marshy landscape of the Rann of Kutchh is partly due to the fact that it was once the estuary of a great river.

The government constituted Haryana Sarasvati Heritage Development Board (HSHDB) had conducted a trial run on 30 July 2016 filling the river bed with 100 cu ft/s (2,800 L/s) of water which was pumped into a dug-up channel from tubewells at Uncha Chandna village in Yamunanagar. The water is expected to fill the channel until Kurukshetra, a distance of 40 kilometres. Once confirmed that there is no obstructions in the flow of the water, the government proposes to flow in another 100 cu ft/s (2,800 L/s) after a fortnight. At that time, there were also plans to build three dams on the river route to keep it flowing perennially.

In 2021, the Chief Minister of Haryana stated that over 70 organizations were involved with researching the Saraswati River's heritage, and that the river "is still flowing underground from Adi Badri and up to Kutch in Gujarat."

The Saraswati revival project of Haryana seeks to build channels and dams along the route of the lost river in Haryana, and develop it as a tourist and pilgrimage circuit. Joint efforts by several states en route, from the origin of its initial tributaries in Uttarakhand and Himachal, to its paleodelta in Gujarat with ancient dock at Lothal (one of the southernmost sites of the ancient Indus Valley Civilisation with trade links to Mesopotamia and Sumer), via Haryana, Punjab, Rajasthan, are on to map and revive the flow till Gujarat and build religious tourism and irrigation-cum-flood control facilities along the way.

International Saraswati Festival, organised by the Haryana Saraswati Heritage Development Board (HSHDB), is an annual 5-day international-level festival held in the last week of January in honor of Sarasvati River as a manifestation of Hindu goddess Saraswati, during which the annual pilgrimage along the Saraswati route is organised through various ghats on religious tirthas and Indus Valley Civilization sites.

== See also ==
- Brahmavarta
- Drishadvati River
- Rigvedic rivers
- Sapta Sindhu
- Indus River
- Saraswat Brahmins
- Triveni Sangam
- Sarasvati Pushkaram
- Anahita

== Sources ==
Printed sources

- Anthony, David W. (2007), The Horse, the Wheel, and Language: How Bronze-Age Riders from the Eurasian Steppes Shaped the Modern World, Princeton University Press
- Beckwith, Christopher I. (16 March 2009), Empires of the Silk Road: A History of Central Eurasia from the Bronze Age to the Present, Princeton University Press, ISBN 978-1-4008-2994-1
- Bhargava, M. L. (1964). The Geography of Rigvedic India. Lucknow.
- Bryant, Edwin (2001), The Quest for the Origins of Vedic Culture, Oxford University Press, ISBN 978-0-19-513777-4
- Chatterjee, Anirban; Ray, Jyotiranjan S.; Shukla, Anil D.; Pande, Kanchan (20 November 2019). "On the existence of a perennial river in the Harappan heartland". Scientific Reports. 9 (1): 17221. Bibcode:2019NatSR...917221C. doi:10.1038/s41598-019-53489-4. ISSN 2045-2322. PMC 6868222. PMID 31748611.
- Clift, Peter D.; Carter, Andrew; Giosan, Liviu; Durcan, Julie; et al. (2012), "U–Pb zircon dating evidence for a Pleistocene Sarasvati River and capture of the Yamuna River", Geology, 40 (3): 211–214, Bibcode:2012Geo....40..211C, doi:10.1130/g32840.1, S2CID 130765891
- Danino, Michel (2010), The Lost River – On the trail of the Sarasvati, Penguin Books India
- Darian, Steven G. (2001), "5.Ganga and Sarasvati: The Transformation of Myth", The Ganges in Myth and History, Motilal Banarsidass Publ., ISBN 978-81-208-1757-9
- Dave, Aditi Krishna; Courty, Marie-Agnes; Fitzsimmons, Kathryn E.; Singhvia, Ashok Kumar (2019), "Revisiting the contemporaneity of a mighty river and the Harappans: Archaeological, stratigraphic and chronometric constraints", Quaternary Geochronology, 49: 230–235, Bibcode:2019QuGeo..49..230D, doi:10.1016/j.quageo.2018.05.002, S2CID 134501741
- Demkina, T. S. (2017), "Paleoecological crisis in the steppes of the Lower Volga region in the Middle of the Bronze Age (III–II centuries BC)", Eurasian Soil Science, 50 (7): 791–804, Bibcode:2017EurSS..50..791D, doi:10.1134/S1064229317070018, S2CID 133638705
- Eck, Diana L. (2012), India: A Sacred Geography, Clarkson Potter/Ten Speed/Harmony, ISBN 978-0-385-53191-7
- Etter, Anne-Julie (2020), "Creating Suitable Evidence of the Past? Archaeology, Politics, and Hindu Nationalism in India from the End of the Twentieth Century to the Present", South Asia Multidisciplinary Academic Journal, 24/25 (24/25), doi:10.4000/samaj.6926
- Flood, Gavin D. (1996), An Introduction to Hinduism, Cambridge University Press
- Giosan; et al. (2012), "Fluvial landscapes of the Harappan civilization", PNAS, 109 (26): E1688–E1694, Bibcode:2012PNAS..109E1688G, doi:10.1073/pnas.1112743109, PMC 3387054, PMID 22645375
- Giosan, Liviu; Clift, Peter D.; Macklin, Mark G.; Fuller, Dorian Q. (10 October 2013), "Sarasvati II", Current Science, 105 (7): 888–890, JSTOR 24098502
- Gupta, S. P., ed. (1995), The lost Saraswati and the Indus Civilization, Jodhpur: Kusumanjali Prakashan
- Gupta, S. P. (1999). Pande, G. C.; Chattophadhyaya, D. P. (eds.). The dawn of Indian civilization. History of Science, Philosophy and Culture in Indian Civilization. Vol. I. New Delhi: Centre for Studies in Civilizations.
- Hock, Hans (1999) Through a Glass Darkly: Modern "Racial" Interpretations vs. Textual and General Prehistoric Evidence on Arya and Dasa/Dasyu in Vedic Indo-Aryan Society." in Aryan and Non-Aryan in South Asia, ed. Bronkhorst & Deshpande, Ann Arbor.
- Jain, Sharad K.; Agarwal, Pushpendra K.; Singh, Vijay P. (2007), Hydrology and Water Resources of India, Springer Science & Business Media, Bibcode:2007hwri.book.....J, ISBN 978-1-4020-5180-7
- Keith and Macdonell. 1912. Vedic Index of Names and Subjects.
- Kenoyer, J. M. (1997). "Early city-states in south Asia: Comparing the Harappan phase and the Early Historic period". In Nichols, D.L.; Charlton, T.H. (eds.). The Archaeology of City States: Cross-cultural approaches. Washington, DC: Smithsonian Institution. pp. 52–70. ISBN 978-1-56098-722-2.
- Khonde, Nitesh; Singh, Sunil Kumar; Maur, D. M.; Rai, Vinai K.; Chamyal, L. S.; Giosan, Liviu (2017), "Tracing the Vedic Saraswati River in the Great Rann of Kachchh", Scientific Reports, 7 (1): 5476, Bibcode:2017NatSR...7.5476K, doi:10.1038/s41598-017-05745-8, PMC 5511136, PMID 28710495
- Kinsley, David (1998), Hindu Goddesses: Visions of the Divine Feminine in the Hindu Religious Tradition, Motilal Banarsidass Publ., ISBN 978-81-208-0394-7
- Kochhar, Rajesh (2012), "On the identity and chronology of the Ṛgvedic river Sarasvatī", Archaeology and Language III; Artefacts, languages and texts, Routledge, ISBN 978-0-415-10054-0
- Lal, B. B. (2002), The Saraswati Flows On: The Continuity of Indian Culture, New Delhi: Aryan Books International
- Ludvík, Catherine (2007), Sarasvatī, Riverine Goddess of Knowledge: From the Manuscript-carrying Vīṇā-player to the Weapon-wielding Defender of the Dharma, BRILL, ISBN 978-90-04-15814-6
- Maemoku, Hideaki; Shitaoka, Yorinao; Nagatomo, Tsuneto; Yagi, Hiroshi (2013), "Geomorphological Constraints on the Ghaggar River Regime During the Mature Harappan Period", in Giosan, Liviu; Fuller, Dorian Q.; Nicoll, Kathleen; Flad, Rowan K.; Clift, Peter D. (eds.), Climates, Landscapes, and Civilizations, American Geophysical Union Monograph Series 198, John Wiley & Sons, ISBN 978-1-118-70443-1
- McIntosh, Jane (2008), The Ancient Indus Valley: New Perspectives, ABC-CLIO
- Michaels, Axel (2004), Hinduism. Past and present, Princeton, New Jersey: Princeton University Press
- Mitra, D. S.; Bhadu, Balram (10 March 2012). "Possible contribution of River Saraswati in groundwater aquifer system in western Rajasthan, India". Current Science. 102 (5).
- Mukherjee, Ashoke (2001), "RIGVEDIC SARASVATI: MYTH AND REALITY" (PDF), Breakthrough, 9 (1), Breakthrough Science Society
- Oldham, R.D. 1893. "The Sarsawati and the Lost River of the Indian Desert". Journal of the Royal Asiatic Society. 1893. 49–76.
- Pal, Yash (1984). "Remote Sensing of the "Lost" Sarasvati River". In Lal, B. B. (ed.). Frontiers of the Indus Civilization.
- Parpola, Asko (2015). The Roots of Hinduism: The Early Aryans and the Indus Civilization. Oxford University Press.
- Possehl, Gregory L. (December 1997). "The transformation of the Indus Civilization". Journal of World Prehistory. 11 (4): 425–472. Bibcode:1997JWPre..11..425P. doi:10.1007/bf02220556. JSTOR 25801118. S2CID 161129625.
- Possehl, Gregory L. (2002). The Indus Civilization: A Contemporary Perspective. Rowman Altamira. ISBN 978-0-7591-0172-2.
- Prasad, R. U. S. (2017). River and Goddess Worship in India: Changing Perceptions and Manifestations of Sarasvati. Routledge. doi:10.4324/9781315209401. ISBN 978-1-315-20940-1.
- Puri, V. M. K.; Verma, B. C. (1998). "Glaciological and Geological Source of Vedic Saraswati in the Himalayas". Itihas Darpan. IV (2): 7–36. Archived from the original on 14 September 2006.
- Radhakrishna, B. P. and Merh, S. S. (editors): Vedic Saraswati: Evolutionary History of a Lost River of Northwestern India (1999) Geological Society of India (Memoir 42), Bangalore. Review (on page 3) Review
- Sankaran, A. V. (25 October 1999), "Saraswati – The ancient river lost in the desert", Current Science, 77 (8): 1054–1060, JSTOR 24103577, archived from the original on 19 September 2004
- Schuldenrein, Joseph; Wright, Rita P.; Mughal, M. Rafique; Khan, M. Afzal (2004), "Landscapes, soils, and mound histories of the Upper Indus Valley, Pakistan: New insights on the Holocene environments near ancient Harappa", Journal of Archaeological Science, 31 (6): 777–797, Bibcode:2004JArSc..31..777S, doi:10.1016/j.jas.2003.10.015
- Shaffer, Jim G. (1995), "Cultural tradition and palaeoethnicity in South Asian archaeology", in George Erdosy (ed.), Indo-Aryans of Ancient South Asia, Walter de Gruyter, ISBN 978-3-11-014447-5
- Sindhav, Hetalben Dhanabhai (2016), "The Indus Valley Civilisation (Harappan Civilisation)", International Journal of Social Impact, 1 (2)
- Singh, Ajit (2017), "Counter-intuitive influence of Himalayan river morphodynamics on Indus Civilisation urban settlements", Nature Communications, 8 (1) 1617, Bibcode:2017NatCo...8.1617S, doi:10.1038/s41467-017-01643-9, PMC 5705636, PMID 29184098
- Sinha, Rajiv; Singh, Ajit; Tandon, Sampat (25 July 2020), "Fluvial archives of north and northwestern India as recorders of climatic signatures in the late Quaternary: review and assessment", Current Science, 119 (2): 232, Bibcode:2020CSci..119..232S, doi:10.18520/cs/v119/i2/232-243, S2CID 239534661
- S. G. Talageri, The RigVeda – A Historical Analysis chapter 4
- Valdiya, K. S. (2002), Saraswati: The River That Disappeared, Hyderabad: Universities Press (India), ISBN 978-81-7371-403-0
- Valdiya, K. S. (2013), "The River Saraswati was a Himalayan-born river" (PDF), Current Science, 104 (1): 42
- Valdiya, K. S. (2017). "Prehistoric River Saraswati, Western India". Society of Earth Scientists Series. Cham: Springer International Publishing. doi:10.1007/978-3-319-44224-2. ISBN 978-3-319-44223-5. ISSN 2194-9204. S2CID 132865905.
- Wilke, Annette; Moebus, Oliver (2011), Sound and Communication: An Aesthetic Cultural History of Sanskrit Hinduism, Walter de Gruyter, ISBN 978-3-11-018159-3
- Witzel, Michael (1984), Sur le chemin du ciel (PDF)
- Witzel, Michael (2001), "Autochthonous Aryans? The Evidence from Old Indian and Iranian Texts" (PDF), Electronic Journal of Vedic Studies, 7 (3): 1–93
- Witzel, Michael (2005), "Indocentrism", in Bryant, Edwin; Patton, Laurie L. (eds.), The Indo-Aryan Controversy: Evidence and inference in Indian history, Routledge
- Witzel, Michael (2012), The Origins of the World's Mythologies, Oxford University Press

Web-sources
