= Mandala 6 =

Sixth book of the Rigveda

The sixth Mandala of the Rigveda has 75 hymns, mainly to Agni and Indra. Most hymns in this book are attributed to the bārhaspatya family of Angirasas, especially to Bharadvaja. It is one of the "family books" (mandalas 2–7), the oldest core of the Rigveda, which were composed in early vedic period(1500-1000 BCE).

Deities addressed besides Indra and Agni include the Vishvadevas, Pushan, the Asvins, Ushas (Dawn), the Maruts, Dyaus and Prthivi (Heaven and Earth), Savitar, Brhaspati and Soma-Rudra.

The rivers mentioned in the sixth Mandala are the Sarasvati, Yavyavati and Hariupiya. RV 6.61 is entirely dedicated to Sarasvati. In RV 6.45.31 the term Ganga occurs which refers to the River Ganges.

Talageri (2000), based on his proposition of a westward expansion of early Rigvedic culture from Haryana (contrary to the nearly universally assumed eastward expansion from Gandhara) and his identification of some Rigvedic rivers, claims this Mandala as the oldest of the family books.

== List of incipits ==
The dedication as given by Griffith is in square brackets

6.1 (442) [Agni.] tuváṃ hí agne prathamó manóta
6.2 (443) [Agni.] tuváṃ hí kṣaítavad yáśo
6.3 (444) [Agni.] ágne sá kṣeṣad ṛtapâ ṛtejâ
6.4 (445) [Agni.] yáthā hotar mánuṣo devátātā
6.5 (446) [Agni.] huvé vaḥ sūnúṃ sáhaso yúvānam
6.6 (447) [Agni.] prá návyasā sáhasaḥ sūnúm áchā
6.7 (448) [Agni.] mūrdhânaṃ divó aratím pṛthivyâ
6.8 (449) [Agni.] pṛkṣásya vŕṣṇo aruṣásya nû sáhaḥ
6.9 (450) [Agni.] áhaś ca kṛṣṇám áhar árjunaṃ ca
6.10 (451) [Agni.] puró vo mandráṃ diviyáṃ suvṛktím
6.11 (452) [Agni.] yájasva hotar iṣitó yájīyān
6.12 (453) [Agni.] mádhye hótā duroṇé barhíṣo râḷ
6.13 (454) [Agni.] tuvád víśvā subhaga saúbhagāni
6.14 (455) [Agni.] agnâ yó mártiyo dúvo
6.15 (456) [Agni.] imám ū ṣú vo átithim uṣarbúdhaṃ
6.16 (457) [Agni.] tuvám agne yajñân~āṃ
6.17 (458) [Indra.] píbā sómam abhí yám ugra tárda
6.18 (459) [Indra.] tám u ṣṭuhi yó abhíbhūtiojā
6.19 (460) [Indra.] mahâṁ índro nṛvád â carṣaṇiprâ
6.20 (461) [Indra.] dyaúr ná yá indra abhí bhûma aryás
6.21 (462) [Indra. Visvedevas.] imâ u tvā purutámasya kārór
6.22 (463) [Indra.] yá éka íd dháviyaś carṣaṇīnâm
6.23 (464) [Indra.] sutá ít tváṃ nímiśla indra sóme
6.24 (465) [Indra.] vŕṣā máda índare ślóka ukthâ
6.25 (466) [Indra.] yâ ta ūtír avamâ yâ paramâ
6.26 (467) [Indra.] śrudhî na indra hváyāmasi tvā
6.27 (468) [Indra.] kím asya máde kím u asya pītâv
6.28 (469) [Cows.] â gâvo agmann utá bhadrám akran
6.29 (470) [Indra.] índraṃ vo náraḥ sakhiyâya sepur
6.30 (471) [Indra.] bhûya íd ? vāvṛdhe vīríyāyaṁ
6.31 (472) [Indra.] ábhūr éko rayipate rayīṇâm
6.32 (473) [Indra.] ápūrviyā purutámāni asmai
6.33 (474) [Indra.] yá ójiṣṭha indara táṃ sú no dā
6.34 (475) [Indra.] sáṃ ca tvé jagmúr gíra indra pūrvîr
6.35 (476) [Indra.] kadâ bhuvan ráthakṣayāṇi bráhma
6.36 (477) [Indra.] satrâ mádāsas táva viśvájanyāḥ
6.37 (478) [Indra.] arvâg ráthaṃ viśvávāraṃ ta ugra
6.38 (479) [Indra.] ápād itá úd u naś citrátamo
6.39 (480) [Indra.] mandrásya kavér diviyásya váhner
6.40 (481) [Indra.] índra píba túbhya * sutó mádāya
6.41 (482) [Indra.] áheḷamāna úpa yāhi yajñáṃ
6.42 (483) [Indra.] práti asmai pípīṣate
6.43 (484) [Indra.] yásya tyác chámbaram máde
6.44 (485) [Indra.] yó rayivo rayíṃtamo
6.45 (486) [Indra.] yá ânayat parāvátaḥ
6.46 (487) [Indra.] tuvâm íd dhí hávāmahe
6.47 (488) [Indra, Etc.] svādúṣ kílāyám mádhumāṁ utâyáṃ
6.48 (489) [Agni and Others.] yajñâ-yajñā vo agnáye
6.49 (490) [Visvedevas.] stuṣé jánaṃ suvratáṃ návyasībhir
6.50 (491) [Visvedevas.] huvé vo devîm áditiṃ námobhir
6.51 (492) [Visvedevas.] úd u tyác cákṣur máhi mitráyor âṁ
6.52 (493) [Visvedevas.] ná tád divâ ná pṛthivyânu manye
6.53 (494) [Pusan.] vayám u tvā pathas pate
6.54 (495) [Pusan.] sám pūṣan vidúṣā naya
6.55 (496) [Pusan.] éhi vâṃ vimuco napād
6.56 (497) [Pusan.] yá enam ādídeśati
6.57 (498) [Indra and Pusan.] índrā nú pūṣáṇā vayáṃ
6.58 (499) [Pusan.] śukráṃ te anyád yajatáṃ te anyád
6.59 (500) [Indra-Agni.] prá nú vocā sutéṣu vāṃ
6.60 (501) [Indra-Agni.] śnáthad vṛtrám utá sanoti vâjam
6.61 (502) [Sarasvati.] iyám adadād rabhasám ṛṇacyútaṃ
6.62 (503) [Asvins.] stuṣé nárā divó asyá prasántā
6.63 (504) [Asvins.] kúva tyâ valgû puruhūtâ adyá
6.64 (505) [Dawn.] úd u śriyá uṣáso rócamānā
6.65 (506) [Dawn.] eṣâ siyâ no duhitâ divojâḥ
6.66 (507) [Maruts.] vápur nú tác cikitúṣe cid astu
6.67 (508) [Mitra-Varuna.] víśveṣāṃ vaḥ sat~âṃ jyéṣṭhatamā
6.68 (509) [Indra-Varuna.] śruṣṭî vāṃ yajñá údyataḥ sajóṣā
6.69 (510) [Indra-Visnu.] sáṃ vāṃ kármaṇā sám iṣâ hinomi
6.70 (511) [Heaven and Earth.] ghṛtávatī bhúvanānām abhiśríyā
6.71 (512) [Savitar.] úd u ṣyá deváḥ savitâ hiraṇyáyā
6.72 (513) [Indra-Soma.] índrāsomā máhi tád vām mahitváṃ
6.73 (514) [Brhaspati.] yó adribhít prathamajâ ṛtâvā
6.74 (515) [Soma-Rudra.] sómārudrā dhāráyethām asuryàm
6.75 (516) [Weapons of War.] jīmûtasyeva bhavati prátīkaṃ
