= Sagarika (disambiguation) =

Sagarika is an Indian singer and actress.

Sagarika may also refer to:

== People ==
- Sagarika Chakraborty (born 1982), an Indian mother involved in a child custody dispute in Norway, basis of the 2023 film Mrs Chatterjee vs Norway
- Sagarika Ghatge (born 1986), Indian actress and models
- Sagarika Ghose (born 1964), Indian journalist, columnist and author
- Sagarika Gomes (1961-1989), Sri Lankan newscaster and aspiring artist

== Arts and entertainment ==
- Sagarika (1956 film), an Indian Bengali-language film
- Sagarika, an album by Amit Kumar
- "Sagarika", a 1997 song by Ridip Dutta
- "Sagarika", a 1999 song by Zubeen Garg
- Sagarika (TV series), a 2019 Indian Bengali-language soap opera

== Other uses ==
- Sagarika (missile), Indian submarine ballistic missile

== See also ==
- Sagara (disambiguation)
- Sagar (disambiguation)
- Saagar (disambiguation)
- Sagri (disambiguation)
- SAAG (disambiguation)
