= Nadistuti Sukta =

Hymn

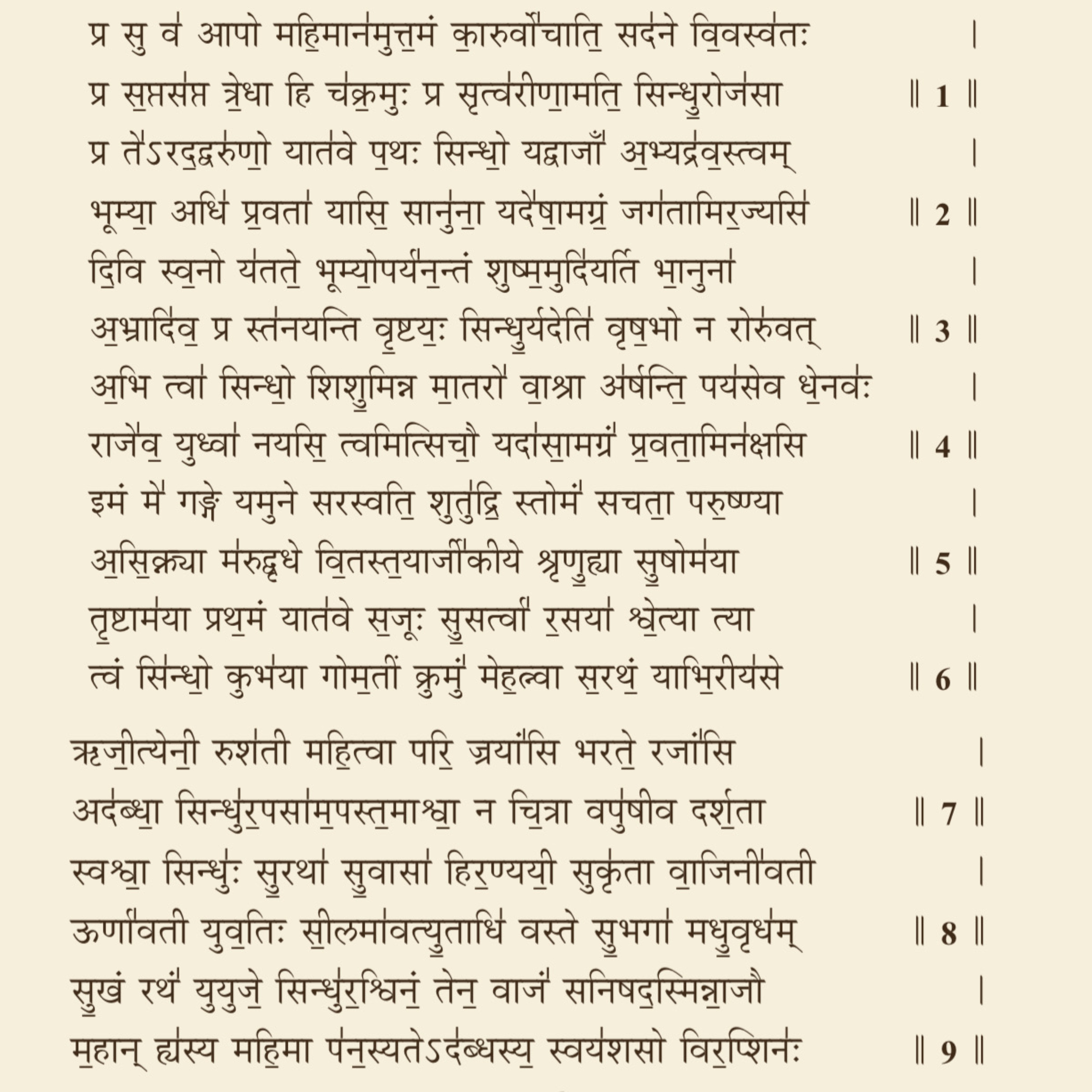
The Nadistuti sūkta from Hymn 75 of the 10th mandala of the Rigveda

The Nadistuti Sukta (Sanskrit: नदीस्तुति सूक्तम्; IAST: Nadīstuti Sūktam) is the 75th hymn (sukta) of 10th Mandala of the Rigveda. Nadistuti sukta is important for the reconstruction of the geography of the Vedic civilization. Sindhu (the Indus) is addressed as the mightiest of rivers and addressed specifically in verses 1, 2, 7, 8 and 9.

== The rivers ==
In verse 5, the rishi enumerates ten rivers, beginning with the Ganga and moving westwards:

Oh Ganga, Yamuna, Sarasvati, Shutudri (Sutlej), Parushni (Iravati, Ravi), follow my praise! O Asikni (Chenab) Marudvridha, Vitasta (Jhelum), with the Arjikiya (Haro) and Sushoma (Sohan), listen!

— Translation: Griffith

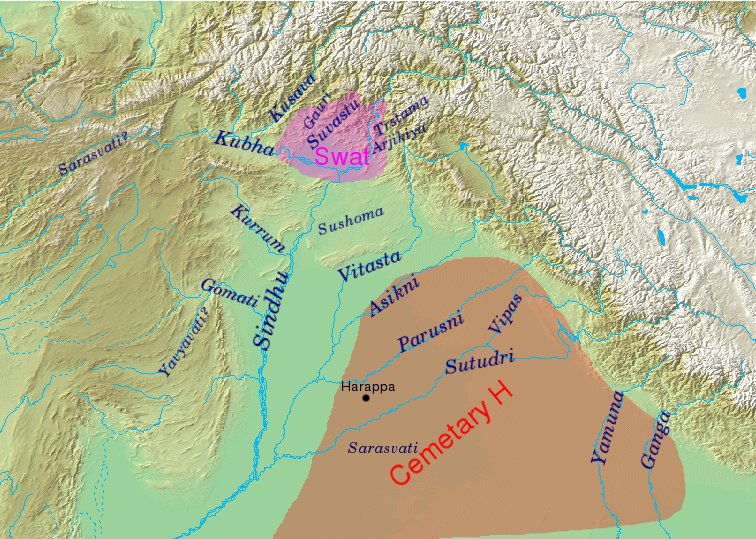
Rivers mentioned in Rigveda

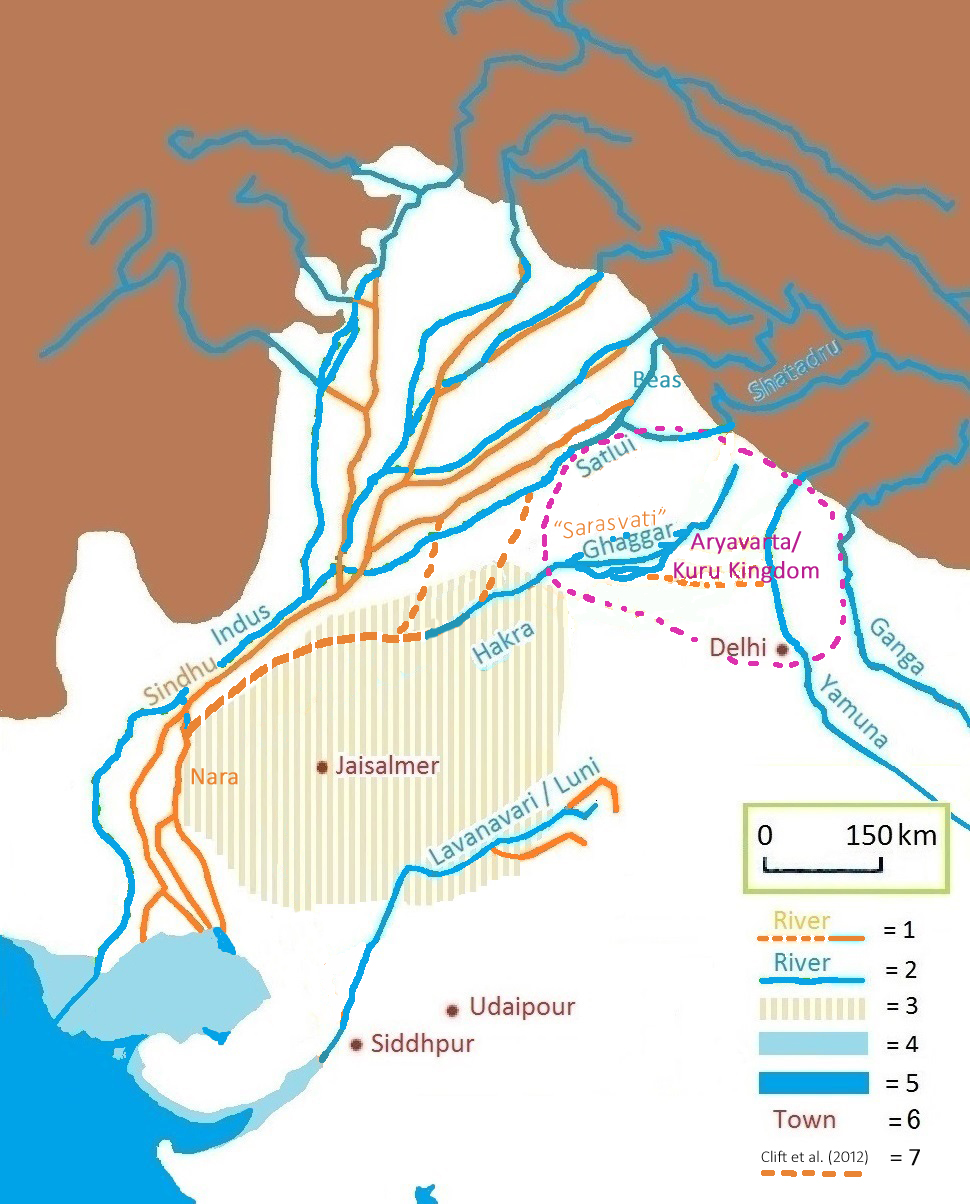
Vedic and present-day Ghaggar-Hakra river-course, with Aryavarta/Kuru kingdom, and pre-Harappan Hakra/Shutudri-Yamuna paleochannels as proposed by Clift et al. (2012) and Khonde et al. (2017). (Note: See Clift et al. (2012) map and Honde te al. (2017) map.) 1 = ancient river 2 = today's river 3 = today's Thar desert 4 = ancient shore 5 = today's shore 6 = today's town 7 = dried-up Harappan Hakra course, and pre-Harappan Sutlej paleochannels (Clift et al. (2012)).

1. Ganga
2. Yamuna
3. Sarasvati
4. Sutudri
5. Parusni
6. Asikni
7. Marudvrdha
8. Vitasta
9. Arjikiya
10. Susoma

Verse 6 adds northwestern rivers (tributaries of the Indus flowing through Afghanistan and north-western Pakistan),

“First thou goest united with the Trishtama on this journey, with the Susartu, the Rasa, and the Sveti, O Sindhu with the Kubha (Kophen, Cabul river) to the Gomoti (Gomal), with the Mehatnu to the Krumu ( Kurum) with whom thou proceedest together."

— Translated by Max Mueller.

Griffith translates: "First united with the Trishtama in order to flow, with the Susartu and Rasa, and with this Svetya (you flow), O Sindhu (Indus) with the Kubha (Kabul R.) to the Gomati (Gomal), with the Mehatnu to the Krumu (Kurram), with whom you rush together on the same chariot."

1. Trstama
2. Susartu
3. Rasā
4. Shvetya
5. Sindhu
6. Kubha
7. Gomati
8. Krumu
9. Mehatnu

According to Max Mueller on 10.75.5 in the book India: What Can It Teach Us? : "Satadru (Sutlej)". "Parushni (Iravati, Ravi)". "Asikni, which means black". "It is the modern Chinab". " Marudvridha, a general name for river. According to Roth the combined course of the Akesines and Hydaspes". Vitasta, the last of the rivers of the Punjab, changed in Greek into Hydaspes"."It is the modern Behat or Jilam". "According to Yaska the Arjikiya is the Vipas". "Its modern name is Bias or Bejah". "According to Yaska the Sushoma is the Indus".

== Sources ==
- Clift, Peter D.; Carter, Andrew; Giosan, Liviu; Durcan, Julie; et al. (2012), "U–Pb zircon dating evidence for a Pleistocene Sarasvati River and capture of the Yamuna River", Geology, 40 (3): 211–214, Bibcode:2012Geo....40..211C, doi:10.1130/g32840.1, S2CID 130765891
- Khonde, Nitesh; Kumar Singh, Sunil; Maur, D. M.; Rai, Vinai K.; Chamyal, L. S.; Giosan, Liviu (2017), "Tracing the Vedic Saraswati River in the Great Rann of Kachchh", Scientific Reports, 7 (1): 5476, Bibcode:2017NatSR...7.5476K, doi:10.1038/s41598-017-05745-8, PMC 5511136, PMID 28710495
