= Saagri =

Saagri may refer to:

- Saagri, Rõuge Parish, a village in Võru County, Estonia
- Saagri, Setomaa Parish, a village in Võru County, Estonia

== See also ==
- Sagri (disambiguation)
