= Sagara =

Sagara may refer to:

== People ==
- Sagara (ethnic group), a people of Tanzania
- Sagara (Vedic king), Ikshvaku dynasty
- Sagara (Uppara), a caste of southern India
- Sagara clan, a clan of 16th century Japan
- Sekihotai (Sagara Souzou), a leader of the Sekihotai military unit during the Boshin War
- Sagara Taketō (相良 武任; 1498–1551), Japanese samurai
- Sousuke Sagara, the protagonist of the anime and manga series Full Metal Panic
- Sanosuke Sagara, a fictional character in the manga and anime series Rurouni Kenshin
- Sāgara (Dragon King), one of the eight dragon kings (Hachidai ryuuou) of Buddhism
- Brendan Sagara, American baseball coach
- Michelle Sagara, an author who also writes under the pseudonyms of Michelle West and Michelle Sagara West

== Places ==
- Sagara, Shimoga District, a city in Shimoga District in Karnataka, India
  - Sagar (Vidhana Sabha constituency)
- Sagar, Yadgir district, a village in Yadgit District in Karnataka, India
- Sagara, Kumamoto, a village in Kumamoto Prefecture, Japan
- Sagara, Shizuoka, a village in Shizuoka Prefecture, Japan
- Sagara (Tanzanian ward), an administrative ward in Tanzania

== See also ==
- Sagarra, a Spanish surname
- Sagar (disambiguation)
- Saagar (disambiguation)
- Sagarika (disambiguation)
- Samandar (disambiguation)
