= Sagarra =

Sagarra is a Spanish surname. Notable people with the surname include:

- Alcides Sagarra Carón (born 1936), Cuban sport official, coach of the Cuban National Boxing Team (1964–2001)
- Joan de Sagarra (1939–2025), Catalan journalist and writer, son of Josep Maria
- Josep Maria de Sagarra (1894–1961), Catalan writer

== See also ==
- Sagarras Bajas, a locality in the Spanish province of Huesca
- Sagara (disambiguation)
