= Saghar, Afghanistan =

Saghar
- Village
- Location in Afghanistan
- Coordinates: 33°42′0″N 63°52′0″E
- Country: Afghanistan
- Province: Ghor Province
- District: Saghar District
- Elevation: 7,333 ft (2,235 m)

Saghar is a village in Saghar District in Afghanistan's Ghor Province. It is located at 33°42'0N 63°52'0E with an altitude of 2235 metres (7335 feet).

== See also ==
- Ghōr Province
