= Adarsana =

Philosophical term

Adarsana refers to the real non-seeing of objects which already exist; it refers to the ignorance of factual existence of things. This term figures prominently in the Yoga school of thought, and in Jain philosophy.

== Meaning ==
Adarsana or adarshan in Sanskrit as an adjective means latent or invisible, and as a noun it means non-vision, disregard, non-appearance, neglect, latent condition disappearance, not-seeing. It also means agyan and avidya. Vaidyanath Shastri citing Sl. 2.25 and Sl. 3.55 of Vyasa Bhashya writes that by understanding the non-seeing of objects that exist one understands the seeing of those objects and understands their reality. Darsana means seeing. Therefore, Panini, in his Ashtadhyayi (Sutra 1.1.60 and 61), has given its meaning as - disappearance, invisibility, elision of an object, which fact is denoted by luk, shlu and lup; lup refers to real non-seeing which already exists. In other words, Adarsana refers to the ignorance of factual existence of things. In Ayurveda, the term, adarsana, means visual errors and blindness that results in not seeing the objects that already exist. In the Puranas, Adarsana is the mind-born mother it is so said because the act of seeing and the act of not seeing or non-seeing is an activity of the mind.

== Implication ==
The term, adarsana, as a technical term in Yoga referring to ignorance or absence of knowledge, figures prominently in the discussions pertaining to the Sadhanapada of Yoga Sutras of Patanjali. Patanjali systemised the Yoga philosophy or Yoga- darsana propounded by Acarya Hiranyagarbha which is the practical application of Samkhya principles earlier systemised through twenty two sutras by Kapila. Vyasa-bhasya which is Vyasa’s commentary on the Yoga Sutras of Patanjali has been commented upon by Vachaspati Misra and Vigyanabhikshu. Vyasa states that liberation consists precisely in the cessation of the mind which cessation occurs by the disappearance of the cause of misconception or adarsana while adding that correct vision of reality (darsana) stops or sublates misconception which is the cause of bondage. Vyasa explains that adarsana is the particular conjunction of avidya in relation to the inward individual consciousness. Vyasa in his commentary on Sadhanapada of Yoga Sutras elaborately discusses and explains the concept of adarsana. Therefore, Adarsana or wrong conception or contrary knowledge is that contact of the Purusa with the Gunas in which the Gunas serve as objects of Purusa. The modification of the mind in the shape of experience of pleasure and pain is adarsana. Adarsana ceases on attainment of discriminative knowledge that gradually leads to Kaivalya or liberation. It is also known as the power which manifests as knowing (darsana), or as the characteristic of both the knower (Purusa) and the knowable.

== Application as per Yoga School of thought ==
The Yoga School of Hindu Philosophy considers Adarsana as the sway i.e. proneness to Gunas, which sway lasts till the Gunas are active and that it is non-production of the primary mind. The primary mind is that which ceases to function after presenting the objects of experience and discernment to the owner, the Seer. The mind that ceases to function when right knowledge and aversion to objects of enjoyment through renunciation takes place is the primary mind. This school of thought also views Adarsana as the existence of experience and liberation in a latent state as the latency of Avidya or wrong knowledge or want of discrimination which is the cause of alliance of Buddhi and Purusa and its co-existing adarsana. Adarsana is Pradhana which has a dual nature i.e. it is static and also fluctuating and it is the cognitive faculty because Pradhana has the tendency to fluctuate and which tendency is stored as potential energy, adarsana. Thus, this school considers Adarsana to be the characteristic of both Pradhana and Purusa as a particular form of cognition, as all knowledge except discriminatory knowledge. Vyasa in his commentary on Yoga Sutra II.23 tells us that adarsana is the failure to see or ignorance (avidya). Patanjali in his Yoga Sutra II.24 does explain that the cause of identification (samyoga) of the Atman, the experiencer, with Prakrti, the object of experience, i.e. bondage, is ignorance. When adarsana ceases, the alliance of Buddhi and Purusa that causes misery ceases and there is complete, eternal cessation of bondage, the state of aloofness of Purusa and non-occurrence of future contact with the Gunas ensues.

== Buddhist view ==
But, Dharmakirti, the Buddhist philosopher, states that pervasion cannot be founded on the observation of darsana (co-presence) or the observation of adarsana (co-absence) which is the view held also by the Caravakas and the Jains, because identity and causation are the only acceptable grounds of pervasion, unless two things are related in one of these ways, there can be no necessity and no pervasion, and non-difference implies essential identity in spite of the difference in cognitive contents of the two expressions.

== Jain belief ==
In Jainism, the term, adarsana, indicates the condition of mental unease and the suffering of loss of faith resulting from the failure in achieving the desired highest goal after long sadhana, tapas etc., which negative feeling does not affect one who has transcended anger, violence, jealousy, waywardness, bad or evil intentions, untruth, and who is disciplined and adopting the Brahmacharya Dharma has forsaken his household or family-life, all desires for possession of things and readily donates whatever is possessed by him. The overcoming of this negative feeling is called Adarsana-vijay.

== Other application ==
According to Baudhayana, Aryavarta lies west of Kalakavana, east of Adarsana, south of the Himalayas and north of the Vindhyas. Dharamsutra II.2.16 speaks of Vinasana as Adarsana, the western boundary of Aryavarta.
