= Rigvedic rivers =

Rivers mentioned in the Hindu Rig Veda

The Rigveda refers to a number of rivers located in the northwestern Indian subcontinent, from Gandhara to Kurukshetra.

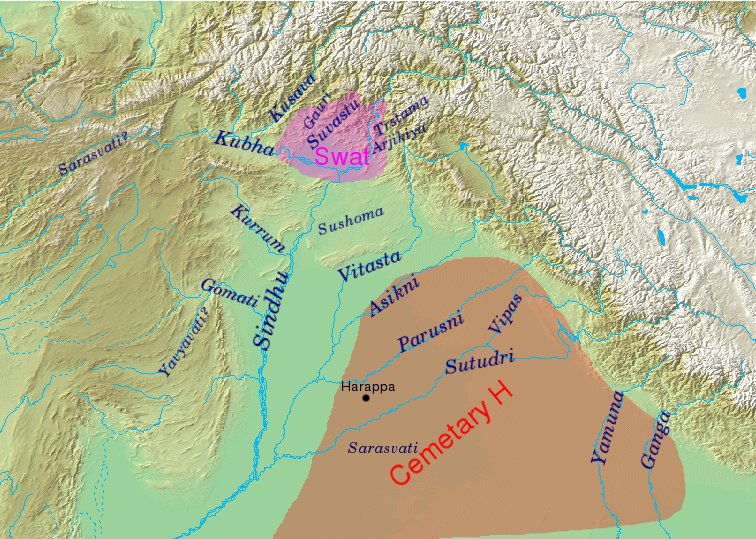
Rivers mentioned in Rigveda

== Rigvedic geography ==
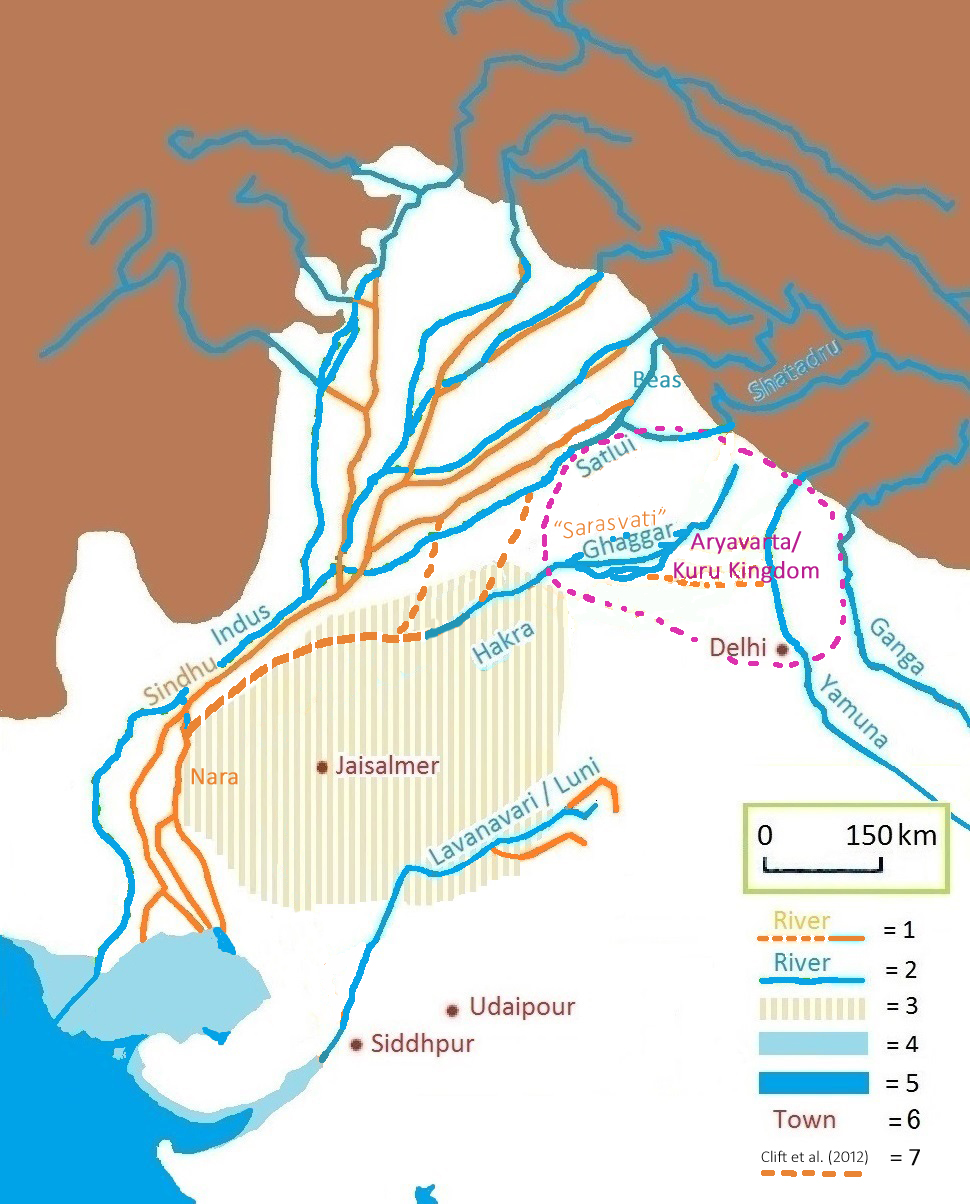
Vedic and present-day Ghaggar-Hakra river-course, with Aryavarta/Kuru kingdom, and pre-Harappan Hakra/Shutudri-Yamuna paleochannels as proposed by Clift et al. (2012) and Khonde et al. (2017). (Note: See Clift et al. (2012) map and Honde te al. (2017) map.) 1 = ancient river 2 = today's river 3 = today's Thar desert 4 = ancient shore 5 = today's shore 6 = today's town 7 = dried-up Harappan Hakra course, and pre-Harappan Sutlej paleochannels (Clift et al. (2012)).

Identification of Rigvedic hydronyms has engaged multiple historians; it is the single most important way of establishing the geography and chronology of the early Vedic period. Rivers with certain identifications stretch from Hindu Kush to the western Gangetic plain, clustering in the Sapta Sindhu region (modern day Punjab and surrounding regions). The Rigveda mentions the sapta-sindhavaḥ (Sanskrit: सप्तसिन्धवः, seven rivers), along with other rivers:

“He has surveyed eight summits of the Earth, three shore or desert regions, seven rivers.” (aṣṭaú vy àkhyat kakúbhaḥ pr̥thivyā́s trī́ dhánva yójanā saptá síndhūn RV.I.35.8).

Sapta-sindhavaḥ is cognate with Avestan hapta həndu, and is interpreted as referring to Punjab. (Note: 'Seven Rivers' include Indus and the five rivers of Punjab. Seventh is generally believed to be the legendary Sarasvati; however, J. S. Grewal considers river Kabul more likely to be the seventh river instead. See also Avestan geography#Vendidad references) The region's name comes from پنج, panj, 'five' and آب, āb, 'water' thus "five waters", a Persian calque of the Sanskrit Pancha-nada meaning "five rivers".

The same names were often imposed on different rivers as the Vedic culture migrated Hindu Kush (where they stayed for a considerable time) to the subcontinent via Sapta Sindhu.

== List of rivers ==
Multiple hydronyms are located in the Rigvedic corpus; they are slotted according to rough geographical locations, following the scheme of Michael Witzel. Alongside, opinions of scholars about modern correlates are provided:

Indus:

- Síndhu – Identified with Indus. The central lifeline of Rigveda.

Northwestern Rivers:

- Tr̥ṣṭā́mā – Blažek identifies with Gilgit. Witzel notes it to be unidentified.
- Susártu – Unidentified.
- Ánitabhā – Unidentified.
- Rasā́ – Described once to be on the upper Indus; at other times a mythical entity.
- Mehatnū – A tributary of Gomatī́. Unidentifiable.
- Śvetyā́ – Unidentified.
- Kúbhā – Identified with Kabul river.
- Krúmu – Identified with Kurrum.
- Suvā́stu – Identified with Swat.
- Gomatī́ – Identified with Gomal.
- Saráyu / Harōiiu – Blažek identifies with Sarju. Witzel identifies with Hari.
- Kuṣávā – Probably the Kunar River.
- Yavyā́vatī – Noted to be a branch of Gomatī́. Witzel as well as Blažek identifies with Zhob River. Dähnhardt comments it to be synonymous to Yamúnā or flowing very close to it.

Eastern tributaries:

- Suṣómā – Identified with Soan.
- Arjikiya – Blažek identifies with Haro. Witzel speculates it to be Poonch or Tawi.
- Rivers of Jammu :
  - Suryāputrī – Identified with Tawi.
  - Asiknī́ – Identified with Chenab.
  - Iravatī – Identified with Ravi.
- Rivers of Punjab:
  - Vitástā – Identified with Jhelum.
  - Asiknī́ – Identified with Chenab.
  - Iravatī – Identified with Ravi.
  - Vípāśā – Identified with Beas.
  - Śutudrī́ – Identified with Sutlej.
  - Marúdvr̥dhā – Identified with Mahuvardhavan.

Haryana:

- Sarasvati (also identified with Helmand in Afghanistan)
  - Āpayā́ and Āpayā́ – Streams/rivers of Sarasvati basin.
  - Drishadvati

Eastern Rivers:

- Áśmanvatī – Identified with Assan.
- Yamúnā – Identified with Yamuna.
  - Aṃśumátī – Probably an epithet for Yamúnā.
- Gáṅgā – Identified with Ganga.

== See also ==
- Ap (water)
- Aryan migration
- India (Herodotus)
- Nadistuti sukta
- Old European hydronymy
- Out of India theory
- Rigvedic deities
- River goddess
- Samudra
- Zhetysu – 7 rivers of Central Asia

== Sources ==
- Blažek, Václav. "Hydronymia R̥gvedica". In: Linguistica Brunensia. 2016, vol. 64, iss. 2, pp. 7–54. ISSN 2336-4440; ISSN 1803-7410.
- Clift, Peter D.; Carter, Andrew; Giosan, Liviu; Durcan, Julie; et al. (2012), "U–Pb zircon dating evidence for a Pleistocene Sarasvati River and capture of the Yamuna River", Geology, 40 (3): 211–214, Bibcode:2012Geo....40..211C, doi:10.1130/g32840.1, S2CID 130765891
- Khonde, Nitesh; Kumar Singh, Sunil; Maur, D. M.; Rai, Vinai K.; Chamyal, L. S.; Giosan, Liviu (2017), "Tracing the Vedic Saraswati River in the Great Rann of Kachchh", Scientific Reports, 7 (1): 5476, Bibcode:2017NatSR...7.5476K, doi:10.1038/s41598-017-05745-8, PMC 5511136, PMID 28710495
