= Sagri (Jhelum) =

Pakistani village

Saagri ساگری
- Town
- Location within Punjab, Pakistan Location within Pakistan
- Coordinates: 33°04′02″N 73°36′08″E
- Country: Pakistan
- Province: Punjab
- District: Jhelum
- Tehsil: Dina
- Time zone: UTC+5 (PST)
- Postcode (ZIP): 49390
- Area code: 051

Sagri is a village in Dina Tehsil of Jhelum District, Punjab, Pakistan.
