= Aiysha Saagar =

Australian pop singer (born 1980)

- Born: 6 January 1980 (age 46); Gold Coast, Queensland, Australia
- Genre: Pop
- Occupation: Singer
- Instrument: Vocals
- Years active: 2005–present
- Website: aiyshasaagar.com

Aiysha Saagar (born 6 January 1980) is an Australian pop singer. She completed her studies in Accounting, Law and Financial Planning. She started her career as a glamour model. In 2012 she became an official Brand Ambassador of Australia's Gold Coast. In mid-2012, Aiysha created controversy by posing topless while being the Gold Coast, Australia's brand ambassador. Some Indian-Australian community members felt that Aiysha's topless photo shoot reflect badly on Indians.

Aiysha has released a number of albums so far, and has worked with Himesh Reshammiya for Arzoo Arzoo music album in 2012.

== Albums ==
Album
Beyond India
Tell Me That You Want Me
Mix It Up
Breathless Kisses
Indian Girl
Mundaya (Single)
Chalo Chalo (single)
Mundaya de vich
