= Vidyasagar =

Vidyasagar or Vidya Sagar may refer to:

== People ==
- Acharya Vidyasagar (born 1946), prominent Digambar Jain Acharya (1946-)
- Ishwar Chandra Vidyasagar (1820–1891), Bengali scholar
- Vidyasagar (composer) (born 1963), South Indian music director
- Ch. Vidyasagar Rao, an Indian politician.
- Mathukumalli Vidyasagar (born 1947), control theorist
- Nitya Vidyasagar (born 1985), Indian-American actress and Sesame Street former cast member
- Vidya Sagar Pandya, an Indian banker and politician

== Other ==
- Vidyasagar Setu, commonly known as the Second Hooghly Bridge, a bridge in West Bengal, India linking Howrah to Kolkata
- Vidyasagar University, in Paschim Medinipur district, West Bengal, India
- Vidyasagar (1950 film), an Indian Bengali-language biographical drama
- Vidyasagar (1952 film), an Indian Hindi film of 1952
