= Samudra =

Sankrit word meaning "ocean"

Samudra (Sanskrit: समुद्र; IAST: samudrá) is a Sanskrit term literally meaning the "gathering together of waters" (saṃ- "together" and -udra "water"). It refers to an ocean, sea or confluence. It also forms the name of Samudradeva (Sanskrit: समुद्रदेव; IAST: samudrá-deva), the Hindu god of the ocean. The word is also present on other languages influenced by Sanskrit.

== In the Rigveda ==
The term occurs 133 times in the Rigveda, referring to oceans (real, mythical or figurative) or large bodies of water as well as to large Soma vessels, e.g. RV 6.69.6 (trans. Griffith):

Strengthened with sacred offerings, Indra-Vishnu, first eaters, served with worship and oblation,
Fed with the holy oil, vouchsafe us riches; ye are the lake samudra, the vat that holds the Soma.

The precise semantic field of the Vedic word is difficult to establish, and has been much debated, in particular in relation to the question of whether the bearers of the Rigvedic culture had direct knowledge of the ocean. Apart from the question of direct acquaintance of the bearers of Vedic culture with the ocean in the modern sense of the word, it is generally accepted that their worldview had the world encircled by oceans, a feature likely inherited from Proto-Indo-European mythology, with a "heavenly ocean" above the world, and a subterranean ocean of the underworld. Varuna was the deity presiding over both these oceans, and over water in general.

From the literal meaning of the term, "Any mass of water more than one drop could be sam-udra: water in a jar, a small pool, a large lake, or the sea". And indeed there are symbolic identifications of small quantities of water with mythical oceans, for example in the famous hymn to Varuna, emphasizing Varuna's omnipresence in every drop of water (AVS 4.16.3 cd)

utó samudrá váruṇasya kukṣī́ utā́smínn álpa udaké nílīnaḥ
"even the two oceans (samudra) are the thighs of Varuna; even in this minute drop of water (udake) he is hidden".

The oldest Vedic commentators like the Brihaddevata of Shaunaka, Nighantu and the Nirukta of Yaska interpret the term Samudra as "ocean". The scholar G.V. Davane studied the occurrences of the term samudra in the Rigveda and concluded that the term means "terrestrial ocean".

The Rigveda also speaks of a western and eastern Samudra (10.136.5-6). And in RV 7.6.7 there is an upper and a lower Samudra, where the upper Samudra seems to be a heavenly ocean.

The Marutas "uplift from the ocean the rain, and fraught with vaporous moisture pour the torrents down" in RV 5.55.5. In RV 9.84.4 the moon (Soma) and the winds stir the Samudra. Additionally, RV 1.48.3 may indicate knowledge of the high tide.

In RV 1.116.4 the Asvins rescued Bhujyu by carrying him for three days and three nights to the sea's farther shore. Thus Samudra seems to refer to the ocean in this verse. There are many other verses in the Rig Veda which refer to this tale (e.g. RV 1.118.6; VI 62, 6; VII 69, 7; VIII 5, 22), and where consequently Samudra could be identified with the ocean as well.

=== Samudra and rivers ===
Samudra is usually translated as "ocean, sea" and the word itself means "gathering of waters". A minority of scholars translate the term as "river". However, the Samudra is never said to flow in the Rigveda, but to receive all rivers. The Rigveda also describes the Vedic Sarasvati River as a river that flows to the samudran and "is pure in her course from the mountains to the sea". Rigveda 1.71.7 describes the seven great rivers seeking the Samudra and in RV 7.33.8 it is written that all the rivers flow to the Samudra, but are unable to fill it.

RV 7.49 says that the Samudra is the eldest of the waters (samudra jyestha), and that the goal of the rivers is the Samudra.

According to Bhargava (1964) "samudra" stands for a huge inland lake, of which there were four or seven in Rigvedic sources. He translates sagara as "ocean". In this view the "lowlands" of Kashmir and Kuruksetra were samudra, but the sea in which the Ganga fell is a sagara. Goddess Tirangini was Samudra's wife. Goddess Tirangini was goddess of Rivers. Goddess Lakshmi was Samudra's daughter.

=== Samudra and Vedic deities ===
The Vedic deity Varuna is the deity of the ocean (Samudra). The Vedic deity Indra also occurs frequently in connection with the Samudra. The Rigveda narrates that Indra slew the dragon which released the seven rivers and caused them to enter the ocean. Other gods that often tend to occur together with the Samudra are Agni and Soma.

=== Samudra and ships ===
Some scholars like B.R. Sharma hold that the Rigvedic people may have been shipbuilders engaging in maritime trade. In Rigveda 1.25.7; 7.88.3 and other instances, Samudra is mentioned together with ships. In RV 7.89.4 the rishi Vasishta is thirsting in the midst of water. Other verses mention oceanic waves (RV 4.58.1,11; 7.88.3). Some words that are used for ships are Nau, Peru, Dhi and Druma. A ship with a hundred oars is mentioned in RV 1.116. There were also ships with three masts or with ten oars. RV 9.33.6 says: 'From every side, O Soma, for our profit, pour thou forth four seas filled with a thousand-fold riches."

=== Related terms ===
There are other Sanskrit terms in the Rigveda that appear to mean "Ocean" or have similar meanings. Among them are the terms Salila, Arnas, Apas, Purisha. The waves are called Urmi in the Rigveda, and the lakes are called Saras, Kula, Hrada or Hlada. Another term, as mentioned above, is "Sagara" (सअगर), which likewise is also found in modern Indo-Aryan languages and languages influenced by Sanskrit as an alternative for "Samudra", some even having it more common to use than the latter term, including Balinese, Sundanese, and Javanese.

== In the Yajurveda ==
=== Samudra number ===
The term is mentioned in the mantra at the end of the annahoma ("food-oblation rite") performed during the aśvamedha, the grandest of the Vedic ritual rites of ancient India.

== Satapatha Brahmana ==
In SB 1.6.3.11 there is (as also in the Rigveda) a reference to an eastern and western Samudra.

== See also ==
- Brahmasamudram
- Indian maritime history
- Meluhha
- Samudra Pasai
- Sapta Sindhu
- Sarasvati River
- Samut Prakan province, Thai province

== Literature ==
- Frawley, David. 1991. Gods, Sages, and Kings, Lotus Press, Twin Lakes, Wisconsin ISBN 0-910261-37-7
- Frawley, David: The Rig Veda and the History of India, 2001.(Aditya Prakashan), ISBN 81-7742-039-9
- Frawley, David (2002). "Witzel's vanishing ocean - How to read Vedic texts any way you like". Archived from the original on 2006-05-23.
- Lal, B.B., 1997 The Earliest Civilization of South Asia Delhi, Aryan Books Intern.
- Kazanas, Nicholas (2002). "Rigvedic town and ocean: Witzel vs Frawley" (PDF). Archived from the original (PDF) on 2007-04-13.
