= Saghar District =

Saghar ساغر
- District
- Location within Afghanistan
- Coordinates: 33°41′29″N 63°52′01″E
- Country: Afghanistan
- Province: Ghor
- Center: Titan

Area
  - Total: 2,644 km^{2} (1,021 sq mi)
- Elevation: 2,160 m (7,090 ft)

Population (2012)
  - Total: 33,700

Saghar District is situated in the most southwestern part of Ghor province, Afghanistan with district center Titan. It has a population of 33,700 people. The district, like the other mountainous districts in the province, suffers long and severe winters and continuing drought during the summer.

== Economy ==
The district suffers from poverty and has a weak economy due to disease, low agriculture and livestock production, and poor access to basic infrastructural, social, economical and educational services. Agriculture products include wheat, barley, maize and potato.
