= List of Hindu empires and dynasties =

The following list enumerates Hindu monarchies in chronological order of establishment dates. These monarchies were widespread in South Asia since about 1500 BC, went into slow decline in the medieval times, with most gone by the end of the 17th century, although the last one, the Kingdom of Nepal, dissolved only in 2008.

== Debate about early Indian history ==
The history of India up to (and including) the times of the Buddha, with his life generally placed into the 6th or 5th century BCE, is a subject of a major scholarly debate. The vast majority of historians in the Western world accept the theory of Aryan Migration with c. 1500–1200 BCE dates for the earliest texts of the Rigveda, following the decline of the Indus Valley Civilisation. The Indian scholars, on the other hand, are mostly supporters of the Indigenous Aryanism that declares the indigenous nature of the Indian civilization and the c. 4000 BCE date for the earliest Rigvedas.

Early Indian history does not have an equivalent of chronicles like the ones established in the West by Herodotus in the 5th century BC or Kojiki / Nihongi in Japan. "With the single exception of Rajatarangini (History of Kashmir), there is no historical text in Sanskrit dealing with the whole or even parts of India" (R. C. Majumdar). While there are texts in Sanskrit, the Puranas, that profess to include the early Indian history, the Western scholars assume them to be compiled by brahmins in the 1st millennium CE, thus only being contemporary with the described facts from the time of the Guptas (3rd century CE). These texts are considered by Western scholars to be legendary, corresponding kingdoms are listed separately in the Puranic kings section.

== Ancient dynasties ==
Empire or Dynasty	Established	Disestablished	Capital(s)	Language(s)	Today part of	Map
Kuru kingdom	2000 BCE	350 BCE	Āsandīvat, Hastinapura, Indraprastha	Vedic Sanskrit, Sanskrit	India	
Brihadratha dynasty	1700 BCE	682 BCE	Girivraja	Vedic Sanskrit	India	
Gopala Dynasty	1500 BCE	841 BCE	Pashupatinath Temple, Gaushala, Kathmandu	Sanskrit	Nepal	
Pundravardhana Kingdom	1300 BCE	345 BCE	Mahasthangarh	Pali, Sanskrit	Bangladesh; India	
Anga Kingdom	1100 BCE	530 BCE	Champa	Prakrit, Sanskrit	India	
Vidarbha Kingdom	1100 BCE	500 BCE	Kaundinyapur	Sanskrit	India	
Khasa Kingdom	1100 BCE	500 BCE	Kedarnath ('Kedare-Khasa-Mandale')	Sanskrit, Prakrit, Khas language	Nepal; India	
Panchala Kingdom	1100 BCE	350 CE	Ahichatra, Kampila	Sanskrit	India; Nepal	
Mahisapala dynasty	841 BCE	679 BCE	Kathmandu	Sanskrit	Nepal; India	
Gandhara Kingdom	800 BCE	535 BCE	Puṣkalavati, Takṣaśilā, Puruṣapura	Sanskrit	Afghanistan; Pakistan	
Kingdom of Kosala	700 BCE	345 BCE	Shravasti, Ayodhya	Sanskrit	India; Nepal	
Vajjika League	c. 6th century BCE	c. 468 BCE	Vaishali	Sanskrit	India; Nepal	
Matsya Kingdom	700 BCE	345 BCE	ViratNagar	Sanskrit	India	
Surasena Kingdom	700 BCE	345 BCE	Mathura	Sanskrit	India	
Avanti Kingdom	700 BCE	300 BCE	Ujjayini	Sanskrit	India	
Asmaka Kingdom	700 BCE	300 BCE	Potali	Sanskrit	India	
Kingdom of Vatsa	700 BCE	345 BCE	Kauśāmbī	Sanskrit	India	
Kingdom of Kashi	700 BCE	345 BCE	Banaras	Sanskrit	India	
Chedi Kingdom	700 BCE	345 BCE	Suktimati	Sanskrit	India	
Pradyota dynasty	682 BCE	544 BCE	Rajagriha	Prakrit, Sanskrit	India; Nepal	
Pandyan dynasty	600 BCE	1759 CE	Korkai, Madurai, Tirunelveli, Vizhinjam	Tamil	India	
Chera Dynasty	600 BCE	1753 CE	Karur, Kodungallur, Kollam	Tamil	India	
Haryanka Dynasty	554 BCE	413 BCE	Rajagriha, Pataliputra	Prakrit, Sanskrit	India; Nepal	
Shishunaga dynasty	413 BCE	345 BCE	Rajgir, Vaishali, Pataliputra	Prakrit, Sanskrit	India; Nepal	
Paurava dynasty	400 BCE	301 BCE	Sagala, Mathura	Sanskrit	India; Pakistan	
Chola dynasty	400 BCE	1540 CE	Thanjavur, Gangaikonda Cholapuram, Pazhaiyaarai	Tamil	India	
Malavas	350 BCE	650 CE	Vidisha	Sanskrit	India	

== Classical polities (c. 200s BCE – 500s CE) ==
Empire or Dynasty	Established	Disestablished	Capital(s)	Language(s)	Today part of	Map
Kuninda Kingdom	2nd century BCE	3rd century CE	southern areas of modern Himachal Pradesh	Prakrit, Sanskrit	India	
Shunga Empire	185 BCE	75 BCE	Pataliputra, Vidisha	Prakrit, Sanskrit	India; Bangladesh; Nepal; Bhutan	
Deva Dynasty of Saketa	150 BCE	10 BCE	Ayodhya	Sanskrit	India	
Satavahana Empire	100 BCE	225 CE	Pratishthana, Amaravati	Prakrit, Sanskrit	India	
Kanva Dynasty	75 BCE	30 BCE	Pataliputra or Vidisha	Sanskrit	India	
Northern Satrap Dynasty	60 BCE	2nd century CE	Sagala, Mathura	Prakrit, Sanskrit	India; Pakistan	
Chutu dynasty	30 BCE	280 CE	Banavasi	Prakrit	India	
Kushan Empire	30 CE	375 CE	Puruṣapura, Takṣaśilā, Mathura	Greek, Bactrian, Gandhari Prakrit, Hybrid Sanskrit	India PakistanAfghanistanKyrgyzstanTajikistanUzbekistanIran	
Western Satraps	35 CE	405 CE	Ujjain, Barygaza	Pali, Prakrit, Sanskrit	India; Pakistan	
Funan Empire	50 CE	550 CE	Vyadhapura	Khmer, Sanskrit	Laos; Cambodia; Thailand; Vietnam; Myanmar	
Nagvanshi Dynasty	94 CE	1952 CE	Khukhragarh, Navratangarh	Prakrit, Nagpuri	India	
Parataraja Kingdom	125 CE	300 CE	Loralai	Pali, Prakrit, Sanskrit, Scythian	Pakistan; Afghanistan	
Langkasuka Kingdom	150 CE	1475 CE	-	Malay	Malaysia; Thailand	
Kingdom of Gangga Negara	150 CE	1025 CE	Beruas	Malay	Malaysia	
Kingdom of Champa	192 CE	1832 CE	Indrapura, Vijaya, Panduranga	Chamic languages, Sanskrit	Vietnam; Laos; Cambodia	
Andhra Ikshvaku Dynasty	200 CE	275 CE	Vijayapuri (Nagarjunakonda)	Prakrit, Sanskrit, Telugu	India	
Abhira dynasty	203 CE	370 CE	Anjaneri, Thalner, Prakashe, Bhamer, Asirgarh	Ahirani, Apabhraṃśa Sanskrit	India	
Bharashiva Dynasty	205 CE	335 CE	Padmavati	Prakrit, Sanskrit	India	
Soma Dynasty	205 CE	305 CE	Kathmandu	Sanskrit	Nepal	
Gupta Empire	240 CE	550 CE	Pataliputra	Prakrit, Sanskrit	India; Bangladesh; Pakistan; Nepal; Afghanistan	
Paurava Dynasty (reinstated)	c. 4th century CE	c. 7th century CE	Brahmapur	Sanskrit	India	
Pallava Empire	275 CE	897 CE	Kanchipuram	Tamil, Prakrit, Sanskrit	India	
Licchavi dynasty	305 CE	1200 CE	Kathmandu	Maithili, Sanskrit, Prakrit	Nepal; India; Bhutan	
Kataha	330 CE	1136 CE	Kataha	Old Malay, Sanskrit	Malaysia	
Kadamba Dynasty	345 CE	525 CE	Banavasi	Kannada, Sanskrit	India	
Kingdom of Malwa (350–545)	350 CE	550 CE	Mandsaur	Sanskrit	India	
Kamarupa Kingdom	350 CE	1140 CE	Pragjyotishpura, Haruppeswara, Durjaya	Assamese, Prakrit, Sanskrit	India; Bhutan; Bangladesh; Myanmar	
Tarumanagara Kingdom	358 CE	669 CE	Sundapura	Sundanese, Sanskrit	Indonesia	
Kutai Martadipura	399 CE	1635 CE	Muara Kaman	Sanskrit, probably old version of Kutainese language	Indonesia	
Vishnukundina Dynasty	420 CE	624 CE	Nalgonda, Eluru, Amaravati	Sanskrit, Prakrit, Telugu	India	
Sharabhapuriya Dynasty	465 CE	590 CE	Sharabhapura	Sanskrit	India	
Kingdom of Valabhi	475 CE	776 CE	Vallabhi	Apabhraṃśa, Prakrit, Sanskrit, Sauraseni	India	

== Early Medieval Period (c. 500s CE – c. 1200s CE) ==
Empire or Dynasty	Established	Disestablished	Capital(s)	Language(s)	Today part of	Map
Kingdom of Thanesar	500	606	Thanesar Kannauj	Sanskrit	India; Pakistan	
Nala Kingdom	515	585	Pushkari	Sanskrit	India	
Rai Dynasty	524	632	Aror	Sanskrit	Pakistan	
Chalukya Dynasty	543	753	Badami	Kannada, Sanskrit	India	
Kalachuri Dynasty	550	620	Mahishmati	Sanskrit	India	
Chenla Empire	550	802	Shrestapura, Bhavapura, Isanapura, Shambhupura	Khmer, Sanskrit	Cambodia; Thailand; Laos; Vietnam	
Chahamana Dynasty	550	1194	Shakambhari	Prakrit, Sanskrit	India	
Kalingga Kingdom	550	650	-	Old Javanese, Sanskrit	Indonesia	
Gauda Kingdom	590	626	Karnasuvarna	-	India; Bangladesh	
Taank Kingdom	600	900	Sagala	-	Pakistan India	
Panduvamshi Dynasty	600	790	Shripura	Sanskrit	India	
Eastern Chalukya Empire	624	1189	Vengi, Rajahmundry	Sanskrit, Telugu	India	
Karkota Empire	625	885	Srinagar, Parihaspore	Sanskrit	India; Pakistan	
Brahman Dynasty of Sindh	632	724	Aror	Sanskrit	India Pakistan	
Srivijaya Empire	650	1377	Palembang, Chaiya, Jambi	Old Malay, Sanskrit	Indonesia; Malaysia; Singapore; Thailand; Cambodia; Philippines; Vietnam; Brunei; Taiwan	
Galuh Kingdom	669	1482	Kawali	Sundanese, Sanskrit	Indonesia	
Sunda Kingdom	669	1579	Kawali, Pakuan Pajajaran	Sundanese, Sanskrit	Indonesia	
Kalachuri Tripuri Dynasty	675	1212	Tripuri	Prakrit, Sanskrit	India	
Garhwal Kingdom	688 CE	1949 CE	Srinagar, Uttarakhand; Tehri; Narendranagar	Garhwali, Jaunsari, Sanskrit	India	
Chavda Dynasty	690	942	Panchasar, Aṇahilaváḍa	Prakrit	India	
Mallabhum Kingdom	694	1800	Laugram, Pradyumnapur, Bishnupur	Sanskrit, Prakrit	India; Bangladesh	
Katyuri kings (Karttikeyapur)	700 CE	1065 CE	Joshimath later shifted to Baijnath, Uttarakhand	Khas, Sanskrit, Prakrit	India; Nepal	
Chand kings	700 CE	1790 CE	Champawat	Kumaoni, Dotyali, Nepali	India; Nepal	
Limbuwan	7th Century CE	1774	Morang, Bijaypur	Limbu, Lepcha, Maithili	Nepal; India; Bhutan	
Gurjara-Pratihara dynasty	730	1036	Kannauj	Prakrit, Sanskrit	IndiaAfghanistan; Pakistan	
Mataram Kingdom	732	1006	Mamratipura	Old Javanese, Sanskrit	Indonesia	
Saindhava Dynasty	735	920	Bhutamabilika	Prakrit, Sanskrit	India	
Tomara Dynasty	736	1151	Delhi	Prakrit, Sanskrit	India	
Rashtrakuta Empire	753	982	Manyakheta	Kannada, Sanskrit	India	
Khmer Empire	802	1431	Mahendraparvata, Hariharalaya, Koh Ker, Yasodharapura	Khmer, Sanskrit	Cambodia; Laos; Myanmar; Thailand; Vietnam	
Chudasama Dynasty	825	1472	Vamanasthali, Junagadh	Old Gujarati, Prakrit	India	
Later Chola Empire	848	1279	Pazhaiyaarai, Thanjavur, Gangaikonda Cholapuram	Tamil	India; Bangladesh; Sri Lanka; Maldives; Indonesia; Singapore; Malaysia; Thailand; Myanmar	
Somavamshi Dynasty	850	1150	Yayatinagara	Sanskrit	India	
Yadava Dynasty	850	1334	Devagiri	Kannada, Marathi, Sanskrit	India	
Utpala Dynasty	855	1003	Avantipur	Sanskrit	India; Afghanistan; Pakistan	
Hindu Shahi Dynasty	879	1026	Kabul	Sanskrit	Pakistan; Afghanistan; India	
Bali Kingdom	914	1908	Bedulu, Samprangan, Gelgel, Klungkung	Kawi, Balinese	Indonesia	
Pagan Empire	940	1297	Pagan	Burmese, Mon, Pyu	Myanmar	
Kingdom of Malwa	948	1305	Dhar	Prakrit, Sanskrit	India	
Khasa Malla kingdom	954	1450	Sinja Valley, Nepal	Khas, Sanskrit, Dotyali	Nepal; India	
Western Chalukya Empire	973	1189	Manyakheta, Basavakalyan	Kannada, Sanskrit	India	
Rajahnate of Butuan	1001	1756	Butuan	Butuanon, Old Malay	Philippines	
Lohara Dynasty	1003	1320	Srinagar	Sanskrit	India; Afghanistan; Pakistan	
Kingdom of Polonnaruwa	1017	1310	Polonnaruwa	Pali, Sanskrit	India	
Kahuripan Kingdom	1019	1045	Kahuripan	Old Javanese, Sanskrit	Indonesia	
Hoysala Empire	1026	1343	Halebidu, Belur	Kannada, Sanskrit	India	
Janggala Kingdom	1045	1136	Hujung Galuh	Old Javanese, Sanskrit	Indonesia	
Kediri Kingdom	1045	1221	Kadiri	Old Javanese, Sanskrit	Indonesia	
Sena Empire	1070	1230	Nabadwip	Sanskrit, Old Bengali	India; Bangladesh	
Eastern Ganga Empire	1078	1434	Dantapura, Kalinganagara, Kataka, Paralekhemundi	Sanskrit, Telugu, Odia	India	
Gahadavala Dynasty	1080	1194	Varanasi, Kanyakubja	Sanskrit	India	
Karnat Dynasty	1097	1324	Simraungadh	Maithili, Sanskrit	Nepal; India	
Chero dynasty	12th CE	18th CE		Bhojpuri, Nagpuri	India	
Sambhuvaraya Dynasty	1150	1375	Rajagambhiram, Padaveedu	Sanskrit, Tamil	India	
Vanni Nadu Dynasty	1150	1803	Vanni	Tamil	Sri Lanka	
Deva Dynasty	1156	1250	Bikrampur	Bengali, Sanskrit	Bangladesh; India	
Kakatiya Dynasty	1163	1323	Orugallu	Sanskrit, Telugu	India	
Khen Dynasty	1185	1498	Kamarupanagara, Kamatapura	Assamese, Kamtapuri	India; Myanmar	
Sutiya Kingdom	1187	1673	Swarnagiri, Ratnapur, Sadiya	Assamese, Sanskrit	India	

== Late Medieval Period (c. 1200s CE – c. 1550s CE) ==
Empire or Dynasty	Established	Disestablished	Capital(s)	Language(s)	Today part of	Map
Malla Dynasty	1200	1768	Bhaktapur, Kathmandu, Patan, Nepal	Newari, Maithili, Sanskrit	Nepal	
Doti Rainka kingdom	13th century	1790	Dipayal Silgadhi, Nepal	Dotyali, Khas, Sanskrit, Kumaoni	Nepal; India	
Jaffna Kingdom	1215	1624	Nallur	Tamil	Sri Lanka	
Singhasari Kingdom	1222	1292	Tumapel	Old Javanese, Sanskrit	Indonesia	
Ahom Kingdom	1228	1826	Charaideo, Garhgaon, Rangpur, Jorhat	Assamese, Tai-Ahom	India; Myanmar	
Sambhuvaraya Dynasty	1236	1375	Rajagambhiram, Padaveedu	Tamil, Sanskrit	India	
Yajvapala Dynasty	1237	1289	Nalapura	-	India	
Vaghela Dynasty	1244	1304	Dholka	Apabhramsa, Old Gujarati, Prakrit	India	
Rajahnate of Cebu	1250	1565	Singhapala	Cebuano, Old Malay, Middle Tamil	Philippines	
Narayangarh Raj	1264	1947	Midnapore district	Bengali Language	India	
Majapahit Empire	1293	1527	Majapahit, Wilwatikta	Old Javanese, Sanskrit	Indonesia; Malaysia; Singapore; Brunei; Thailand; Timor Leste; Philippines; Australia	
Sena Dynasty (Nepal)	13th Century CE	18th Century CE	Makwanpurgadhi, Chaudandi, Palpa	Nepali, Maithili Language, Khas, Bengali, Sanskrit	Nepal; India	
Reddy Dynasty	1325	1448	Addanki, Kondavidu, Rajahmundry	Telugu, Sanskrit	India	
Musunuri Nayakas	1150	1369	Warangal	Telugu, Sanskrit	India	
Vijayanagara Empire	1336	1646	Vijayanagara (1336–1565); Penukonda (1565–1592); Chandragiri (1592–1604); Vellore (1604–1646)		India	
Oiniwar Dynasty	1353	1526	Madhubani	Maithili language	India	
Kallala dynasty	1404	1789	Sinja Valley	Khas language, Nepali, Sanskrit	Nepal; India	
Gajapati Empire	1434	1541	Cuttack	Odia, Sanskrit	India	

== Early Modern Period (c. 1550s CE – 1850s CE) ==
Empire or Dynasty	Established	Disestablished	Capital(s)	Language(s)	Today part of	Map
Bhoi dynasty	1541	1947	Cuttack, Puri, Khurda	Odia	India	
Koch Dynasty	1515	1949	Chikana, Kamatapur	Kamtapuri, Assamese, Bengali, Sanskrit	India	
Madurai Nayak Dynasty	1529	1736	Madurai, Tiruchirapalli	Telugu, Tamil, Sanskrit	India	
Thanjavur Nayak Kingdom	1532	1673	Thanjavur	Telugu, Tamil, Sanskrit	India	
Gorkha Kingdom	1559	1768	Gorkha Darbar	Nepali	Nepal	
Raj Darbhanga	1577	1947	Darbhanga	Maithili	India	
Midnapore Raj	1568	1812	Medinipur	Bengali Language	India	
Maratha Empire	1674	1818	Raigad, Gingee, Satara, Pune	Marathi, Sanskrit	India; Pakistan	Maratha Empire
Pudukkottai Kingdom	1680	1800	Pudukkottai	Tamil	India	
Sivaganga Kingdom	1725	1733	Sivaganga	Tamil	India	
Kingdom of Nepal	1768	2008	Kathmandu	Nepali, Sanskrit	Nepal; India; China; Bangladesh	
Jammu and Kashmir	1846	1952	Jammu	Dogri	India; Pakistan; China	

Note: Kingdoms that acted as princely states to the British Empire are not mentioned except for the time period when they exercised sovereign control.

== Puranic kings ==
Five Puranas (Vayu, Matsya, Brahmanda, Vishnu, Bhagavata) contain dynastic Puranic lists. Approach of researchers to these lists varies from outright skepticism, especially prevalent in the 19th century ("extravagant romances, ... works of imagination", "particular year is never mentioned") to cautious partial acceptance along the lines traced by F. E. Pargiter: "false genealogies ... imitate genuine genealogies", accepting limitations does not require to declare the absence of "any trust whatever". Ludo Rocher in his book "The Puranas" (1986) provides a long list of chronological calculations based on Puranic lists with a warning that they are "often highly imaginative".

Kingdom	Capital(s)	Language(s)	Today part of
Puru kingdom		Vedic Sanskrit	India
Yadu kingdom		Vedic Sanskrit	India
Ikshavaku dynasty		Vedic Sanskrit	IndiaNepal
Haihaya kingdom	Mahishmati	Vedic Sanskrit	India

== See also ==
- History of India
  - Greater India & Indosphere
  - Kuru kingdom & Gandhara Kingdom
  - List of Puru and Yadu dynasties
  - Indus Valley Civilisation
  - Janapada & Mahajanapadas
  - Middle kingdoms of India
  - List of Indian monarchs
  - List of Jain states and dynasties
  - Muslim conquests of Afghanistan
- Hinduism
  - Solar dynasty & Lunar dynasty
  - History of Hinduism
  - Hindu cosmology
  - Bhagavad Gita
  - Vedas
  - Sanskrit literature
  - Yuga & Hindu units of time
  - Vedic period & Vedic science
  - Sangam literature
  - Hinduism in Southeast Asia

== Sources ==
- Chaulagain, Nawaraj (2019). "Kingship (Hinduism)". Hinduism and Tribal Religions. Encyclopedia of Indian Religions. Dordrecht: Springer Netherlands. pp. 1–7. doi:10.1007/978-94-024-1036-5_83-1. ISBN 978-94-024-1036-5.
- Klostermaier, K.K. (2014). Hinduism: A Short History. Oneworld Publications. ISBN 978-1-78074-680-7.
- Witzel, Michael (1990). "On Indian historical writing: The case of the Vaṃśāvalīs". Journal of the Japanese Association for South Asian Studies. 1: 1–57.
- Rocher, Ludo (1986). "The Purāṇas as Historical Documents". The Purāṇas. History of Indian literature. O. Harrassowitz. pp. 115–132. ISBN 978-3-447-02522-5.
