= Cedī (tribe) =

Ancient people in the central South Asia

- c. 1200 BCE–c. 300 BCE
- The Cedī kingdom and other Mahajanapadas in the Post Vedic
- Capital: Śuktimatī or Sotthivatī
- Common languages: Prakrits
- Religion: Historical Vedic religion Jainism; Buddhism
- Government: Monarchy
- Historical era: Iron Age India
  - Established: c. 1200 BCE
  - Disestablished: c. 300 BCE
- Today part of: India

Cedī (Sanskrit: Cedī) was an ancient Indo-Aryan tribe of central India whose existence is attested during the Iron Age. The members of the Cedī tribe were named the Caidyas, and were organised into a kingdom, itself also called Cedī.

== Location ==
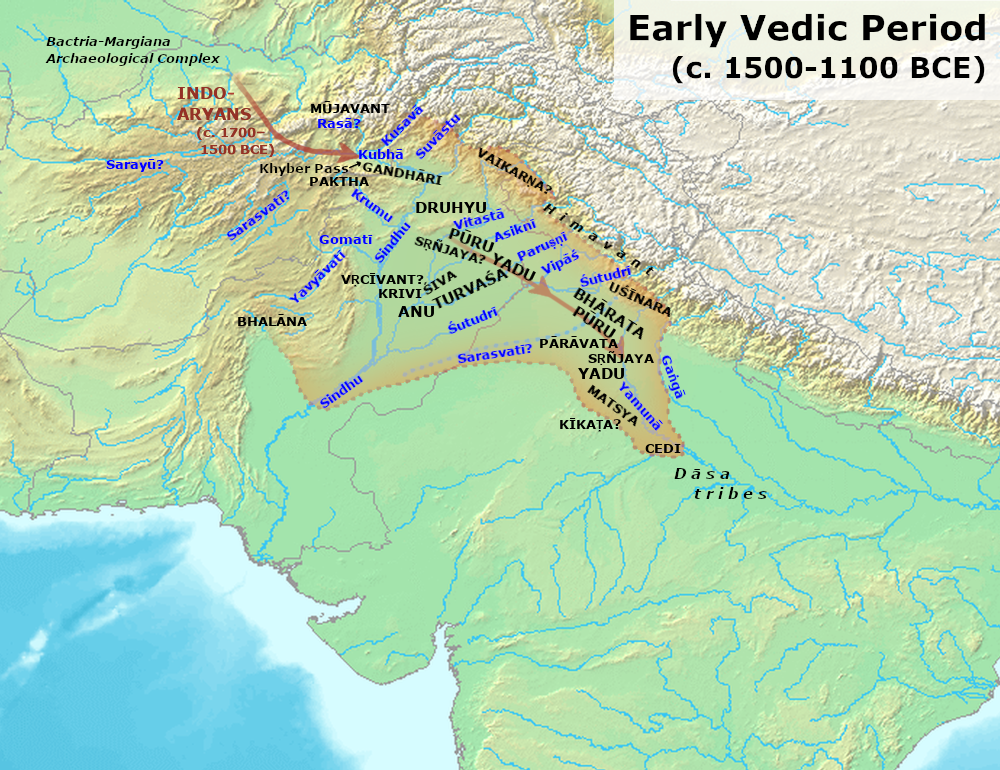
Location of Cedi among the Vedic tribes

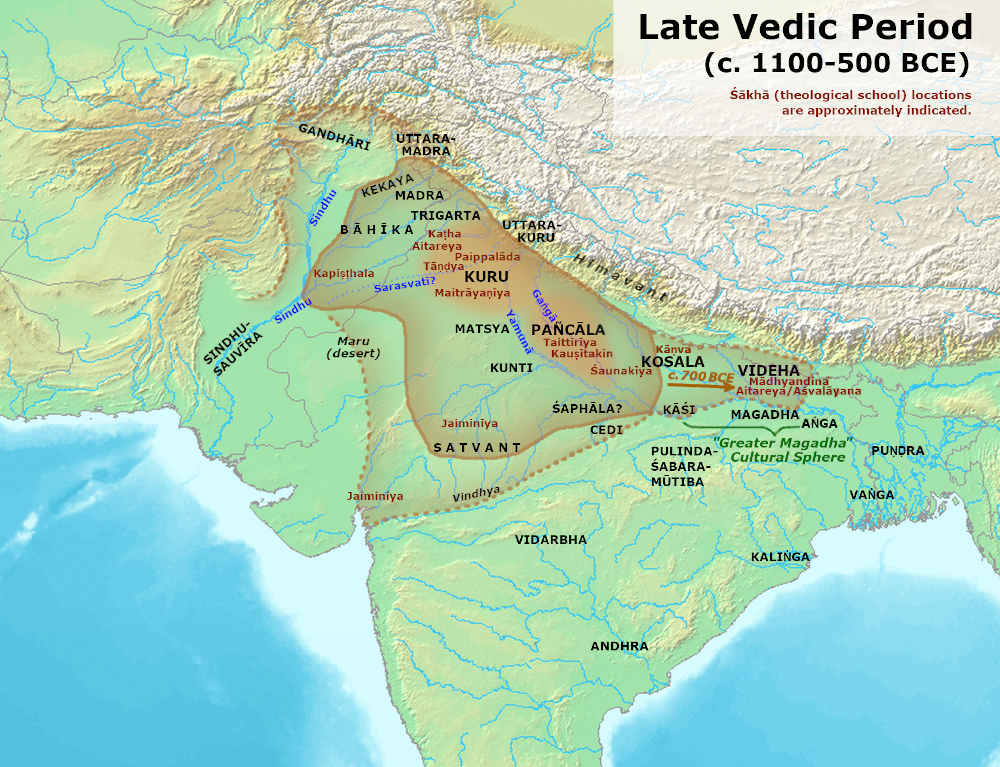
Location of Cedi during the late Vedic period

Location of Cedi during the post-Vedic period

The territory of Cedī was located near the Yamunā river, and its neighbours were Matsya in the west across the Chambal river, Kāsī in the north-east on the Ganges, the Kāruṣas in east in the valley of the Son river, and the Daśārṇas on the banks of the Dhasan river. The area of Cedī thus corresponded to the eastern part of the modern-day Bundelkhaṇḍ along with nearby tracts.

The capital of Cedī was named Sotthivatī in Pāli and Śuktimatī in Sanskrit, and was located by a river of the same name. The location of the capital Suktimati has not been established with certainty. Historian Hem Chandra Raychaudhuri and F. E. Pargiter believed that it was in the vicinity of Banda, Uttar Pradesh. Archaeologist Dilip Kumar Chakrabarti has proposed that Suktimati can be identified as the ruins of a large early historical city, at a place with the modern-day name Itaha, on the outskirts of Rewa, Madhya Pradesh.

== History ==
The Cedī tribe was mentioned in the Ṛgveda, where their king Caidya is praised in a Dānastuti ("praise of gift") at the end of a hymn.

By the 6th to 5th centuries BCE, Cedī had become one of the more important states in Iron Age India, due to which the Buddhist text, the Aṅguttara Nikāya, listed it as one of the solasa Mahājanapadas ("sixteen great states").
