= Mahajanapadas =

Kingdoms in the Indian subcontinent (c. 600 BCE–c. 345 BCE)

- c. 600 BCE – c. 345 BCE
- Map of the 16 Mahājanapadas.
- Common languages: Prakrit; Sanskrit
- Religion: Historical Vedic religion Buddhism; Jainism
- Government: Gaṇasaṅgha; Monarchy
- Historical era: Iron Age
Preceded by
Painted Grey Ware culture
Vedic period
Janapadas
Kuru kingdom
Succeeded by
Nanda Empire
Achaemenid Empire

The Mahājanapadas (Note: Sanskrit: महाजनपद, lit. 'Great Janapadas') were sixteen kingdoms and aristocratic republics that existed in ancient India from the sixth to fourth centuries BCE, during the second urbanisation period.

== History ==
The 6th–5th centuries BCE are often regarded as a major turning point in early Indian history. During this period, India's first large cities since the demise of the Indus Valley Civilisation arose. It was also the time of the rise of śramaṇa movements (including Buddhism and Jainism), which challenged the religious orthodoxy of the Vedic period.

Two of the Mahājanapadas were most probably gaṇasaṅghas (aristocratic republics), and others had forms of monarchy. Ancient Buddhist texts like the Aṅguttara Nikāya make frequent reference to sixteen great kingdoms and republics that had developed and flourished in a belt stretching from Gandhara in the northwest, Anga in the east, and Asmaka in the southern part of the Indian subcontinent. They included parts of the trans-Vindhyan region, and all had developed prior to the rise of Buddhism in ancient India.

Archaeologically, this period has been identified as corresponding in part to the Northern Black Polished Ware culture.

== Overview ==
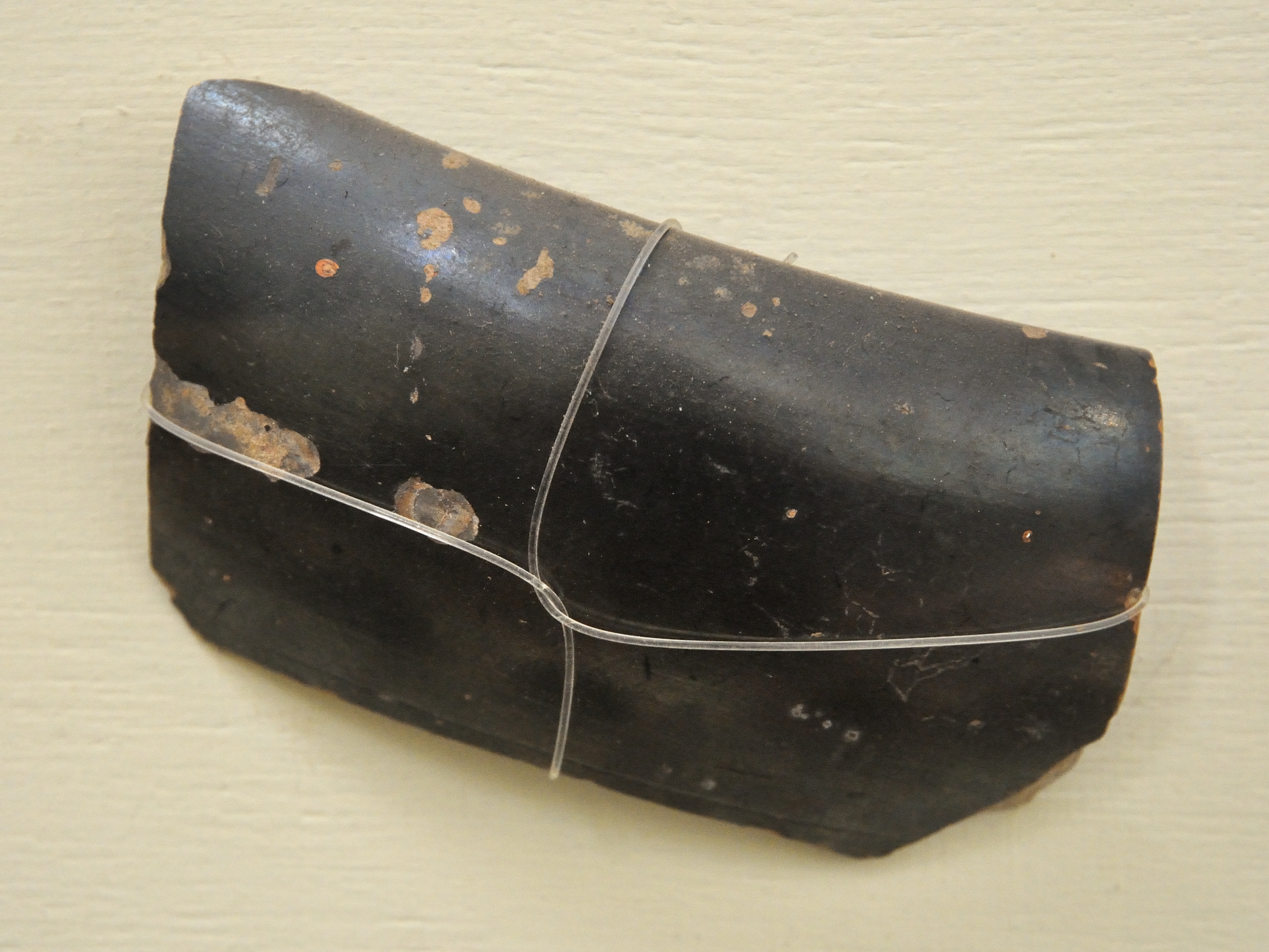
Pottery of the Northern Black Polished Ware culture (c. 500–200 BCE)

The term "Janapada" literally means the foothold of a people. The fact that Janapada is derived from Jana points to an early stage of land-taking by the Jana people for a settled way of life. This process of settlement on land had completed its final stage prior to the times of the Buddha and Pāṇini. The pre-Buddhist northern Indian subcontinent was divided into several Janapadas, demarcated from each other by boundaries. In Pāṇini's Aṣṭādhyāyī, Janapada stands for country and Janapadin for its citizenry. Each of these Janapadas was named after the Kshatriya people (or the Kshatriya Jana) who had settled therein. Buddhist and other texts only incidentally refer to sixteen great nations (Solasa Mahajanapadas) that existed prior to the time of the Buddha. They do not give any connected history except in the case of Magadha. The Buddhist Aṅguttara Nikāya, at several places, gives a list of sixteen great states:

1. Anga
2. Asmaka
3. Avanti
4. Chedi
5. Gandhara
6. Kasi
7. Kamboja
8. Kosala
9. Kuru
10. Magadha
11. Malla
12. Matsya (or Maccha)
13. Panchala
14. Surasena
15. Vajji
16. Vatsa (or Vamsa)

Another Buddhist text, the Dīgha Nikāya, mentions twelve Mahajanapadas from the above list and omits four of them (Assaka, Avanti, Gandhara, and Kamboja).

Chulla-Niddesa, another ancient text of the Buddhist canon, adds Kalinga to the list and substitutes Yona for Gandhara, thus listing the Kamboja and the Yona as the only Mahajanapadas from Uttarapatha.

The Vyākhyāprajñapti (or the Bhagavati Sutra), a sutra of Jainism, gives a different list of sixteen Mahajanapadas:

1. Anga
2. Banga (Vanga)
3. Magadha
4. Malaya
5. Malavaka
6. Accha
7. Vaccha
8. Kochcha
9. Padha
10. Ladha (Radh or Lata)
11. Bajji (Vajji)
12. Moli (Malla)
13. Kasi
14. Kosala
15. Avaha
16. Sambhuttara

The author of the Bhagavati Sutra has a focus on the countries of Madhydesa and of the far east and south only. He omits the nations from Uttarapatha like the Kamboja and Gandhara. The more extended horizon of the Bhagvati and the omission of all countries from Uttarapatha "clearly shows that the Bhagvati list is of later origin and therefore less reliable."

== List of Mahajanapadas ==
=== Aṅga ===
The first reference to the Angas is found in the Atharvaveda where they find mention along with the Magadhas, Gandharis and the Mujavats, apparently as a despised people. The Jaina Prajnapana ranks Angas and Vangas in the first group of Aryan people. It mentions the principal cities of ancient India. It was also a great center of trade and commerce, and its merchants regularly sailed to distant Suvarnabhumi. Anga was annexed by Magadha in the time of Bimbisara. This was the one and only conquest of Bimbisara.

=== Aśmaka ===
The country of Assaka or the Ashmaka tribe was located in Dakshinapatha or southern India. It included areas in present-day Andhra Pradesh, Telangana, and Maharashtra. In Gautama Buddha's time, many of the Assakas were located on the banks of the Godavari River (south of the Vindhya mountains). The capital of the Assakas was Potana or Potali, which corresponds present-day Bodhan in Telangana and Paudanya of Mahabharata. In Maharashtra its capital is located in Potali which corresponds to present day Nandura, Buldhana district. The Ashmakas are also mentioned by Pāṇini. They are placed in the north-west in the Markendeya Purana and the Brhat Samhita. The river Godavari separated the country of the Assakas from that of the Mulakas (or Alakas). The country of Assaka lay outside the pale of Madhyadesa. It was located on a southern high road, the Dakshinapatha. At one time, Assaka included Mulaka and abutted Avanti.

=== Avanti ===
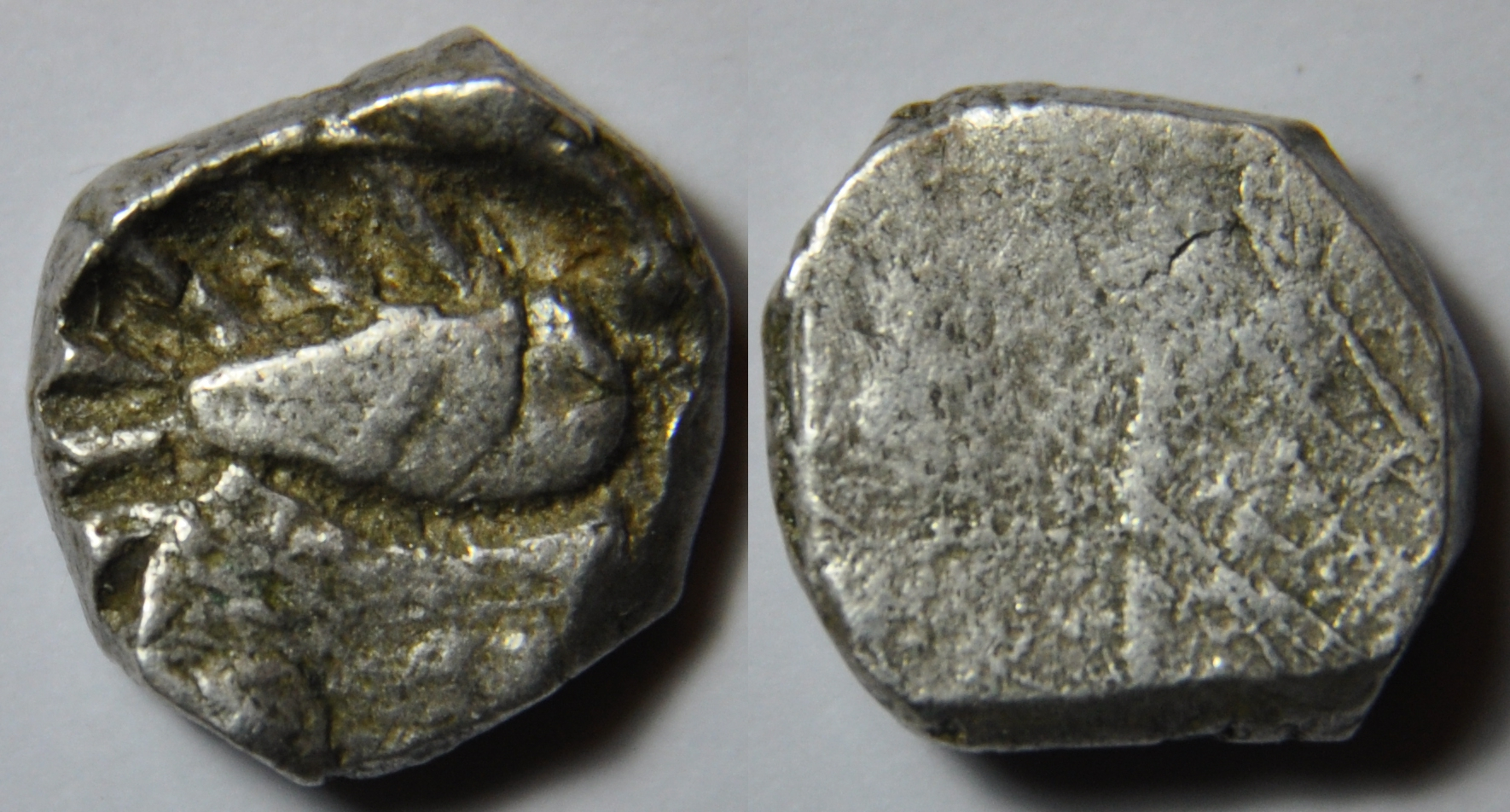
Silver coin of Avanti mahajanapada (4th century BCE)

The country of the Avantis was an important kingdom of western India and was one of the four great monarchies in India in the post era of Mahavira and Buddha, the other three being Kosala, Vatsa and Magadha. Avanti was divided into north and south by the river Narmada. Initially, Mahishamati (Mahissati) was the capital of Southern Avanti, and Ujjaini (Sanskrit: Ujjayini) was of northern Avanti, but at the times of Mahavira and Buddha, Ujjaini was the capital of integrated Avanti. The country of Avanti roughly corresponded to modern Malwa, Nimar and adjoining parts of today's Madhya Pradesh. Both Mahishmati and Ujjaini stood on the southern high road called Dakshinapatha which extended from Rajagriha to Pratishthana (modern Paithan). Avanti was an important centre of Buddhism and some of the leading theras and theris were born and resided there. King Nandivardhana of Avanti was defeated by king Shishunaga of Magadha. Avanti later became part of the Magadhan empire.

=== Chedi ===
The Chedis, Chetis or Chetyas had two distinct settlements of which one was in the mountains of Nepal and the other in Bundelkhand near Kaushambi. According to old authorities, Chedis lay near Yamuna midway between the kingdom of Kurus and Vatsas. In the mediaeval period, the southern frontiers of Chedi extended to the banks of the Narmada River. Sotthivatnagara, the Sukti or Suktimati of Mahabharata, was the capital of Chedi. The Chedis were an ancient people of India and are mentioned in the Rigveda, with their king Kashu Chaidya.

The location of the capital city, Suktimati, has not been established with certainty. Historian Hem Chandra Raychaudhuri and F. E. Pargiter believed that it was in the vicinity of Banda, Uttar Pradesh. Archaeologist Dilip Kumar Chakrabarti has proposed that Suktimati can be identified as the ruins of a large early historical city, at a place with the modern-day name Itaha, on the outskirts of Rewa, Madhya Pradesh.

=== Gandhāra ===
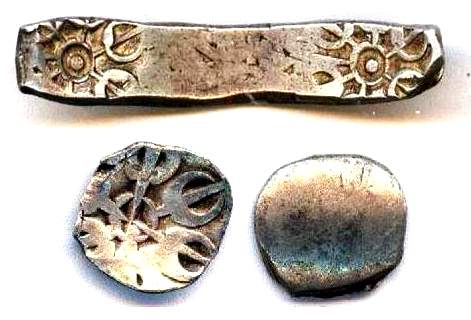
Coin of Early Gandhara Janapada: AR Shatamana and one-eighth Shatamana (round), Taxila-Gandhara region, c. 600–300 BCE

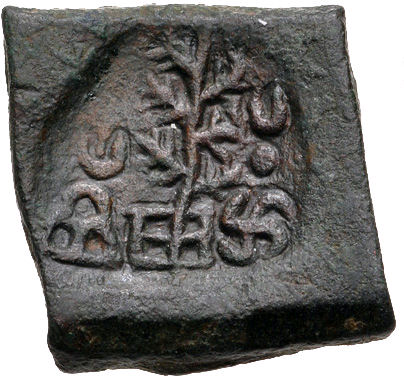
Coin of Takshashila portraying a tree flanked by a hill surmounted by a crescent and a Nandipada above a swastika.

The wool of the Gandharis is referred to in the Rigveda. The Gandharas and their king figure prominently as strong allies of the Kurus against the Pandavas in the Kurukshetra War. The Gandharas were furious people, well-trained in the art of war. According to Puranic traditions, this Janapada was founded by Gandhara, son of Aruddha, a descendant of Yayati. The princes of this country are said to have come from the line of Druhyu who was a famous king of the Rigvedic period and one of the five sons of king Yayati of lunar dynasty. The river Indus watered the lands of Gandhara. Taksashila and Pushkalavati, the two cities of this Mahajanapada, are said to have been named after Taksa and Pushkara, the two sons of Bharata, a prince of Ayodhya and younger brother of Lord Rama. According to Vayu Purana (II.36.107), the Gandharas were destroyed by Pramiti (a.k.a. Kalika) at the end of Kali Yuga. Pāṇini mentioned both the Vedic form Gandhari as well as the later form Gandhara in his Ashtadhyayi. The Gandhara kingdom sometimes also included Kashmira. Hecataeus of Miletus (549–468) refers to Kaspapyros (Kasyapura or Purushapura, i.e., modern day Peshawar) as a Gandharic city. According to Gandhara Jataka, at one time, Gandhara formed a part of the kingdom of Kashmira. The Jataka also gives another name Chandahara for Gandhara.

Gandhara Mahajanapada of Buddhist traditions included territories of east Afghanistan, and north-west of the Punjab (modern districts of Peshawar (Purushapura) and Rawalpindi). Its later capital was Taksashila. The University of ancient Taxila was a renowned centre of learning in antiquity, where scholars from all over the world came to seek higher education. Pāṇini, the Indian genius of grammar and Chanakya are the world-renowned products of Taxila University. King Pukkusati or Pushkarasarin of Gandhara in the middle of the 6th century BCE was the contemporary of king Bimbisara of Magadha. Gandhara was located on the northern high road (Uttarapatha) and was a centre of international commercial activities. According to one group of scholars, the Gandharas and Kambojas were cognate people. It is also contended that the Kurus, Kambojas, Gandharas and Bahlikas were cognate people. According to Dr T. L. Shah, the Gandhara and Kamboja were nothing but two provinces of one empire and were located coterminously, hence influencing each other's language. Naturally, they may have once been a cognate people. Gandhara was often linked politically with the neighboring regions of Kashmira and Kamboja.

=== Kamboja ===
Kambojas are also included in the Uttarapatha. In ancient literature, the Kamboja is variously associated with the Gandhara, Darada and the Bahlika (Bactria). Ancient Kamboja is known to have comprised regions on either side of the Hindu Kush. The original Kamboja was located in eastern Oxus country as neighbor to Bahlika, but with time, some clans of the Kambojas appear to have crossed the Hindukush and planted colonies on its southern side also. These latter Kambojas are associated with the Daradas and Gandharas in Indian literature and also find mention in the Edicts of Ashoka. The evidence in the Mahabharata and in Ptolemy's Geography distinctly supports two Kamboja settlements. The cis-Hindukush region from Nurestan up to Rajauri in southwest of Kashmir sharing borders with the Daradas and the Gandharas constituted the Kamboja country. The capital of Kamboja was probably Rajapura (modern Rajori) in the south-west of Kashmir. The Kamboja Mahajanapada of the Buddhist traditions refers to this cis-Hindukush branch of ancient Kambojas.

The trans-Hindukush region including the Pamirs and Badakhshan which shared borders with the Bahlikas (Bactria) in the west and the Lohas and Rishikas of Sogdiana/Fergana in the north, constituted the Parama-Kamboja country. The trans-Hindukush branch of the Kambojas remained pure Iranian but a large section of the Kambojas of cis-Hindukush appears to have come under Indian cultural influence. The Kambojas are known to have had both Iranian as well as Indian affinities.

The Kambojas were also a well known republican people since Epic times. The Mahabharata refers to several gaṇaḥ (or Republics) of the Kambojas. Kautiliya's Arthashastra attestes the Kambojas republican character and Ashoka's Edict No. XIII also testifies the presence of the Kambojas along with the Yavanas. Pāṇini's Sutras, though tend to convey that the Kamboja of Pāṇini was a Kshatriya monarchy, but "the special rule and the exceptional form of derivative" he gives to denote the ruler of the Kambojas implies that the king of Kamboja was a titular head (king consul) only. According to Buddhist texts, the first fourteen of the above Mahajanapadas belong to Majjhimadesa (Mid India) while the last two belong to Uttarapatha or the north-west division of Jambudvipa.

In a struggle for supremacy that followed in the 6th/5th century BCE, the growing state of the Magadhas emerged as the predominant power in ancient India, annexing several of the Janapadas of the Majjhimadesa. A bitter line in the Puranas laments that Magadhan emperor Mahapadma Nanda exterminated all Kshatriyas, none worthy of the name Kshatriya being left thereafter. This refers to the Kasis, Kosalas, Kurus, Panchalas, Vatsyas and other neo-Vedic tribes of the east Panjab of whom nothing was ever heard except in the legend and poetry. (The Nandas usurped the throne of Shishunaga dynasty c. 345 BCE, thus founding the Nanda Empire.)

The Kambojans and Gandharans, however, never came into direct contact with the Magadhan state until Chandragupta Maurya and Chanakya arose on the scene. But these nations also fell prey to the Achaemenids of Persia during the reign of Cyrus II (558–530 BCE) or in the first year of Darius. Kamboja and Gandhara formed the twentieth and richest satrapy of the Achaemenid Empire. Cyrus II is said to have destroyed the famous Kamboja city called Kapisi (modern Begram) in Paropamisade.

=== Kāśī ===
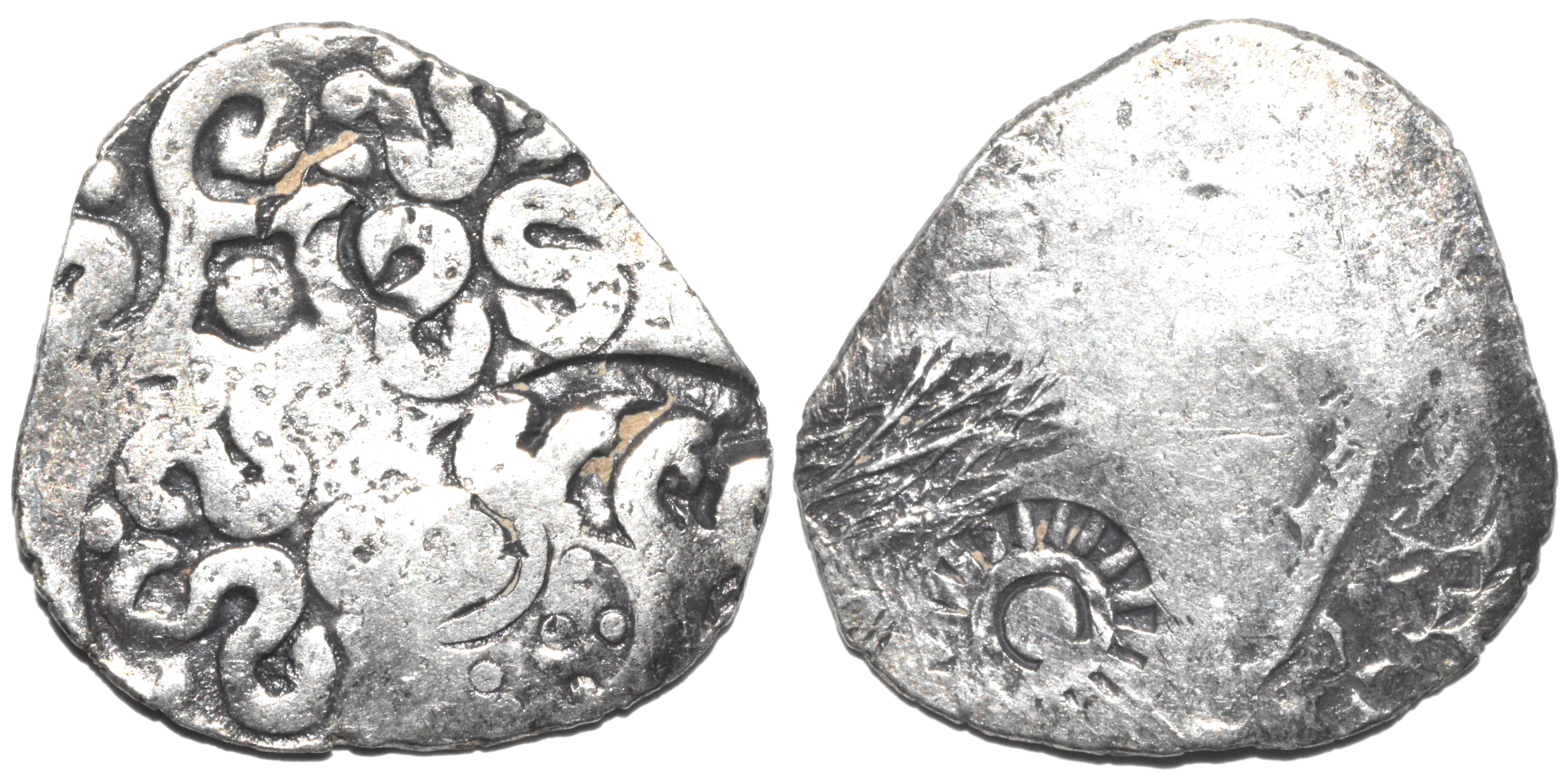
A silver vimshatika coin of Kāśī, circa 525–465 BCE.

The kingdom was located in the region around its capital Varanasi, bounded by the Varuna and Assi rivers in the north and south which gave Varanasi its name. Before Buddha, Kasi was the most powerful of the sixteen Mahajanapadas. Several jataka tales bear witness to the superiority of its capital over other cities in India and speak highly of its prosperity and opulence. These stories tell of the long struggle for supremacy between Kashi and the three kingdoms of Kosala, Anga and Magadha. Although King Brihadratha of Kashi conquered Kosala, Kashi was later incorporated into Kosala by King Kansa during Buddha's time. The Kashis along with the Kosalas and Videhans find mention in Vedic texts and appear to have been a closely allied people. The Matsya Purana and Alberuni spell Kashi as Kausika and Kaushaka respectively. All other ancient texts read Kashi.

=== Kosala ===
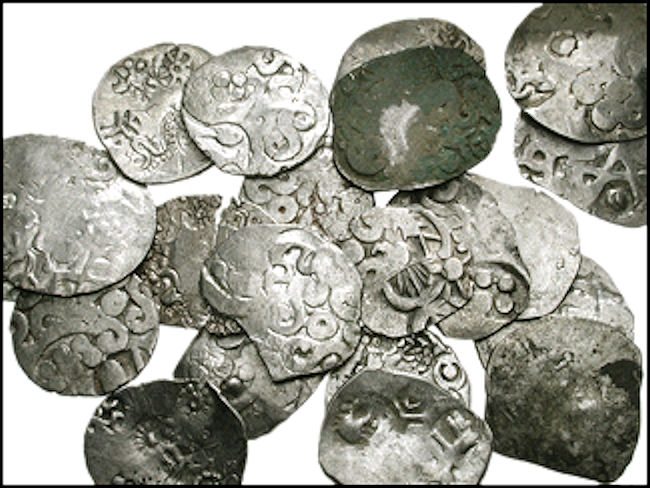
Silver coins of Kosala mahajanapada (c. 525–465 BCE)

The country of Kosala was located to the northwest of Magadha, with its capital at Ayodhya. Its territory corresponded to the modern Awadh (or Oudh) in Central and Eastern Uttar Pradesh. It had the river Ganges for its southern, the river Gandak (Narayani) for its eastern, and the Himalaya mountains for its northern boundary.

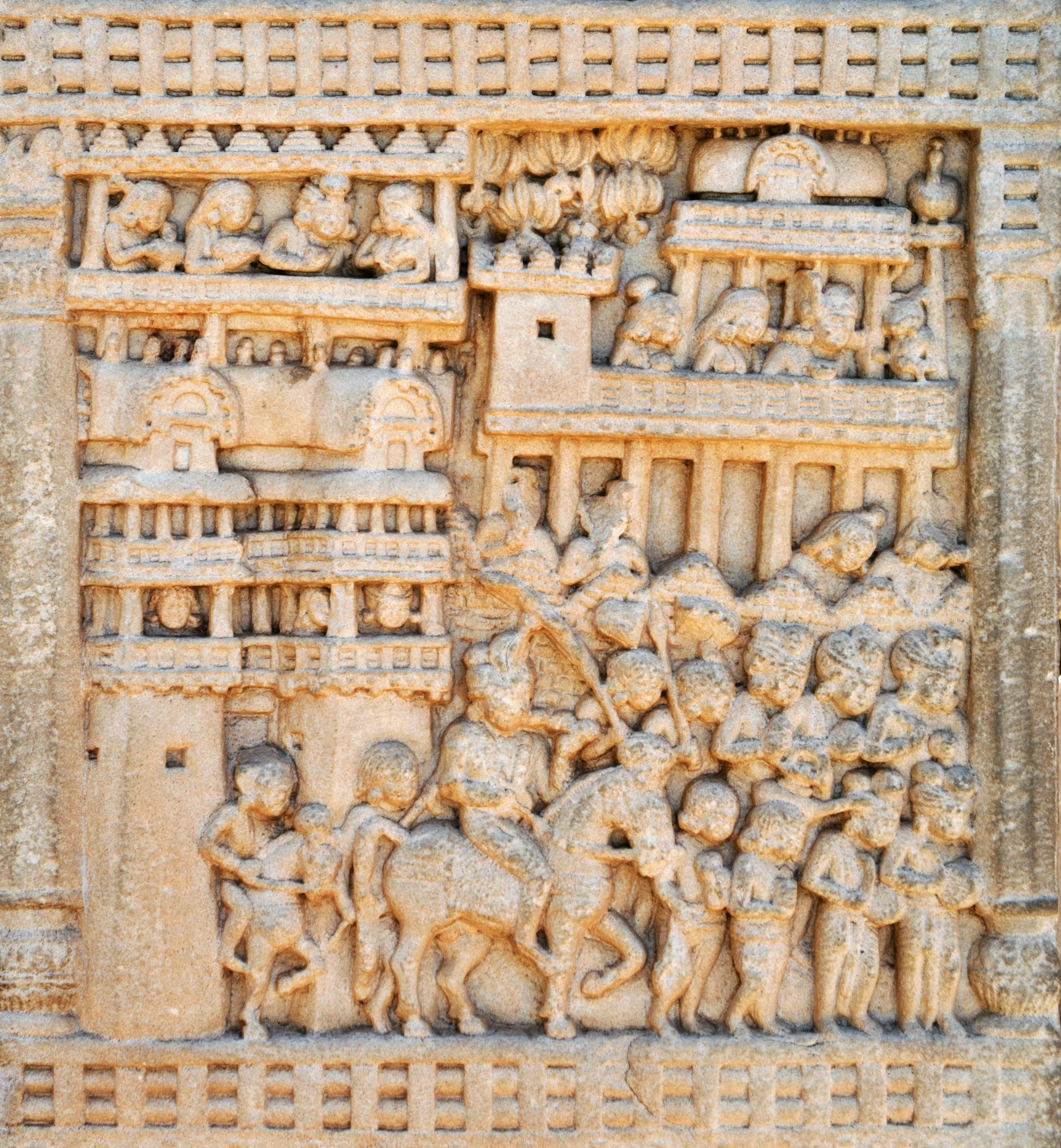
Procession of Prasenajit of Kosala leaving Sravasti to meet the Buddha, Sanchi.

Later, the kingdom was ruled by the famous king Prasenajit during the era of Mahavira and Buddha, followed by his son Vidudabha (Virudhaka). King Prasenajit was highly educated. His position was further improved by a matrimonial alliance with Magadha: his sister was married to Bimbisara and part of Kasi was given as dowry. There was, however, a struggle for supremacy between king Pasenadi (Prasenajit) and king Ajatashatru of Magadha which was finally settled once the confederation of Liccavis became conquered by Magadha. Kosala was ultimately merged into Magadha when Vidudabha was Kosala's ruler. Ayodhya, Saketa, Banaras, and Sravasti were the chief cities of Kosala.

=== Kuru ===
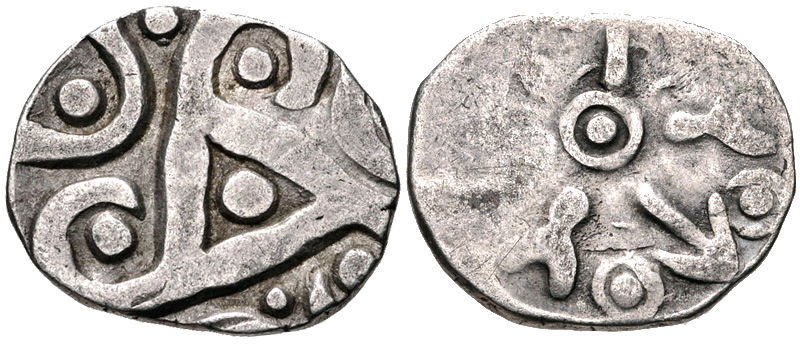
Silver coin of Kuru mahajanapada (4th century BCE)

The Puranas trace the origin of Kurus from the Puru-Bharata family. Kuru was born after 25 generations of Puru's dynasty, and after 15 generations of Kuru, Kauravas and Pandavas were born. Aitareya Brahmana locates the Kurus in Madhyadesha and also refers to the Uttarakurus as living beyond the Himalayas. According to the Buddhist text Sumangavilasini, the people of Kururashtra (the Kurus) came from the Uttarakuru. Vayu Purana attests that Kuru, son of Samvarsana of the Puru lineage, was the eponymous ancestor of the Kurus and the founder of Kururashtra (Kuru Janapada) in Kurukshetra. The country of the Kurus roughly corresponded to the modern Thanesar, state of Delhi, and Meerut district of Uttar Pradesh. According to the Jatakas, the capital of the Kurus was Indraprastha (Indapatta) near modern Delhi which extended seven leagues. At Buddha's time, the Kuru country was ruled by a titular chieftain (king consul) named Korayvya. The Kurus of the Buddhist period did not occupy the same position as they did in the Vedic period but they continued to enjoy their ancient reputation for deep wisdom and sound health. The Kurus had matrimonial relations with the Yadavas, the Bhojas, Trigratas, and the Panchalas. There is a Jataka reference to king Dhananjaya, introduced as a prince from the lineage of Yudhishtra. Though a well known monarchical people in the earlier period, the Kurus are known to have switched to a republican form of government during the 6th to 5th centuries BCE. In the 4th century BCE, Kautiliya's Arthashastra also attests the Kurus following the Rajashabdopajivin (Royal Consul) constitution.

=== Magadha ===
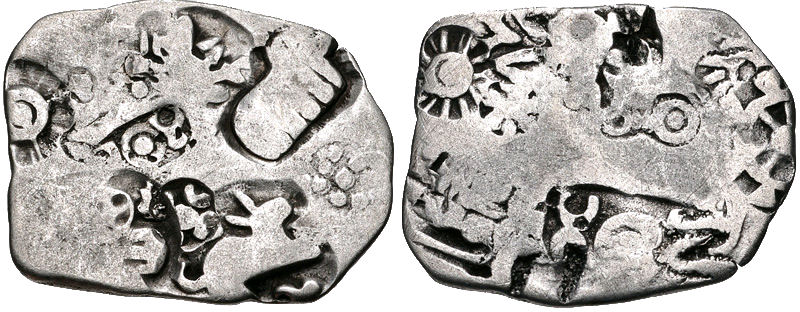
Silver coin of Magadha mahajanapada (c. 350 BCE)

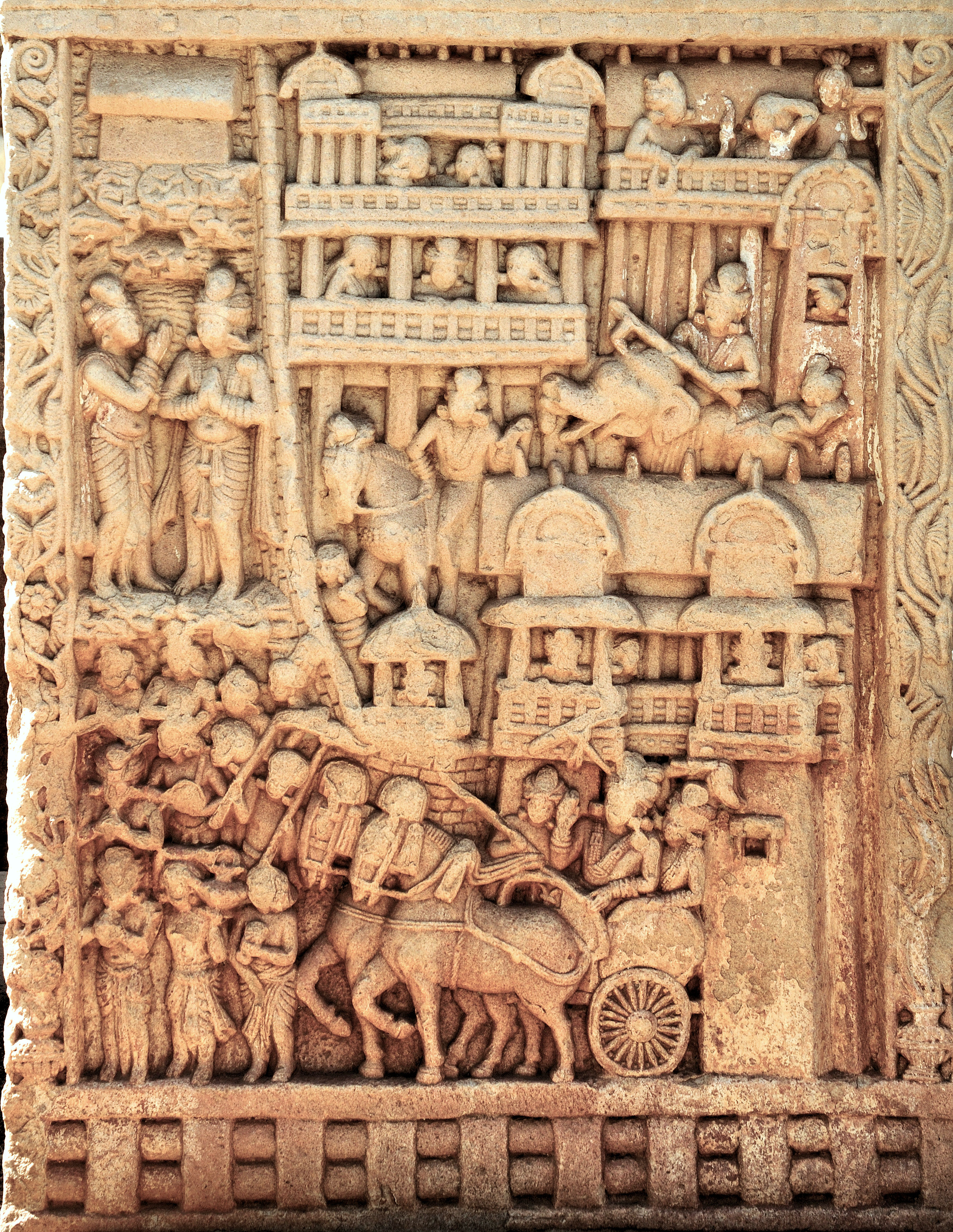
King Bimbisara of Magadha with his royal cortege issuing from the city of Rajagriha to visit the Buddha.

The Magadha was one of the most prominent and prosperous of Mahajanapadas.

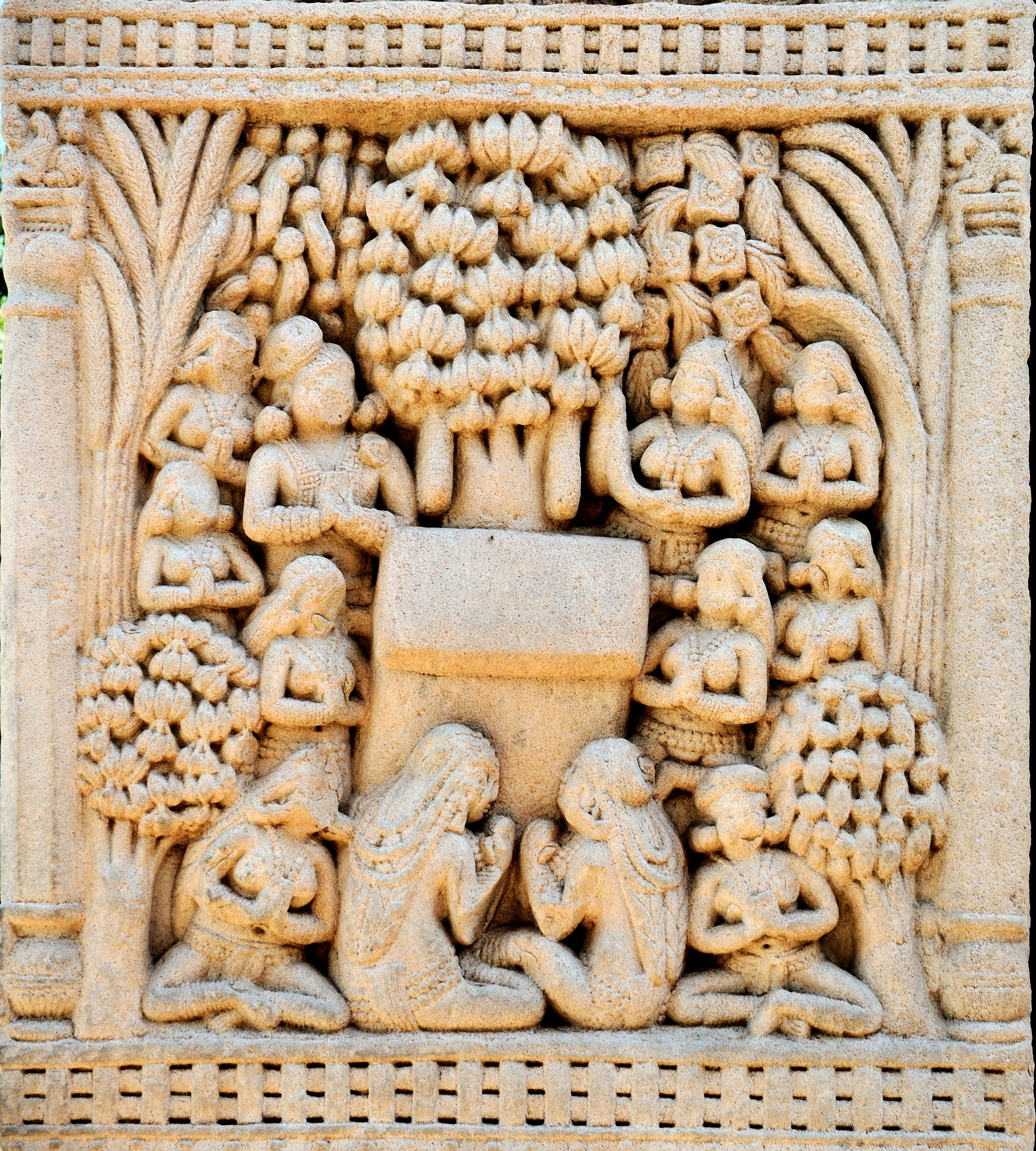
King Bimbisara of Magadha visits the Bamboo Garden (Venuvana) in Rajagriha; artwork from Sanchi.

The kingdom of the Magadhas roughly corresponded to the modern districts of Patna and Gaya in southern Bihar and parts of Bengal in the east. The capital city of Pataliputra was bound in the north by the river Ganges, in the east by the river Champa, in the south by the Vindhya mountains and in the west by the river Sona. During Buddha's time its boundaries included Anga. Its earliest capital was Girivraja or Rajagaha (modern Rajgir in the Nalanda district of Bihar). The other names for the city were Magadhapura, Brihadrathapura, Vasumati, Kushagrapura and Bimbisarapuri. It was an active center of Jainism in ancient times. The First Buddhist Council was held in Rajagaha in the Vaibhara Hills. Later on, Pataliputra became the capital of Magadha.

=== Malla ===
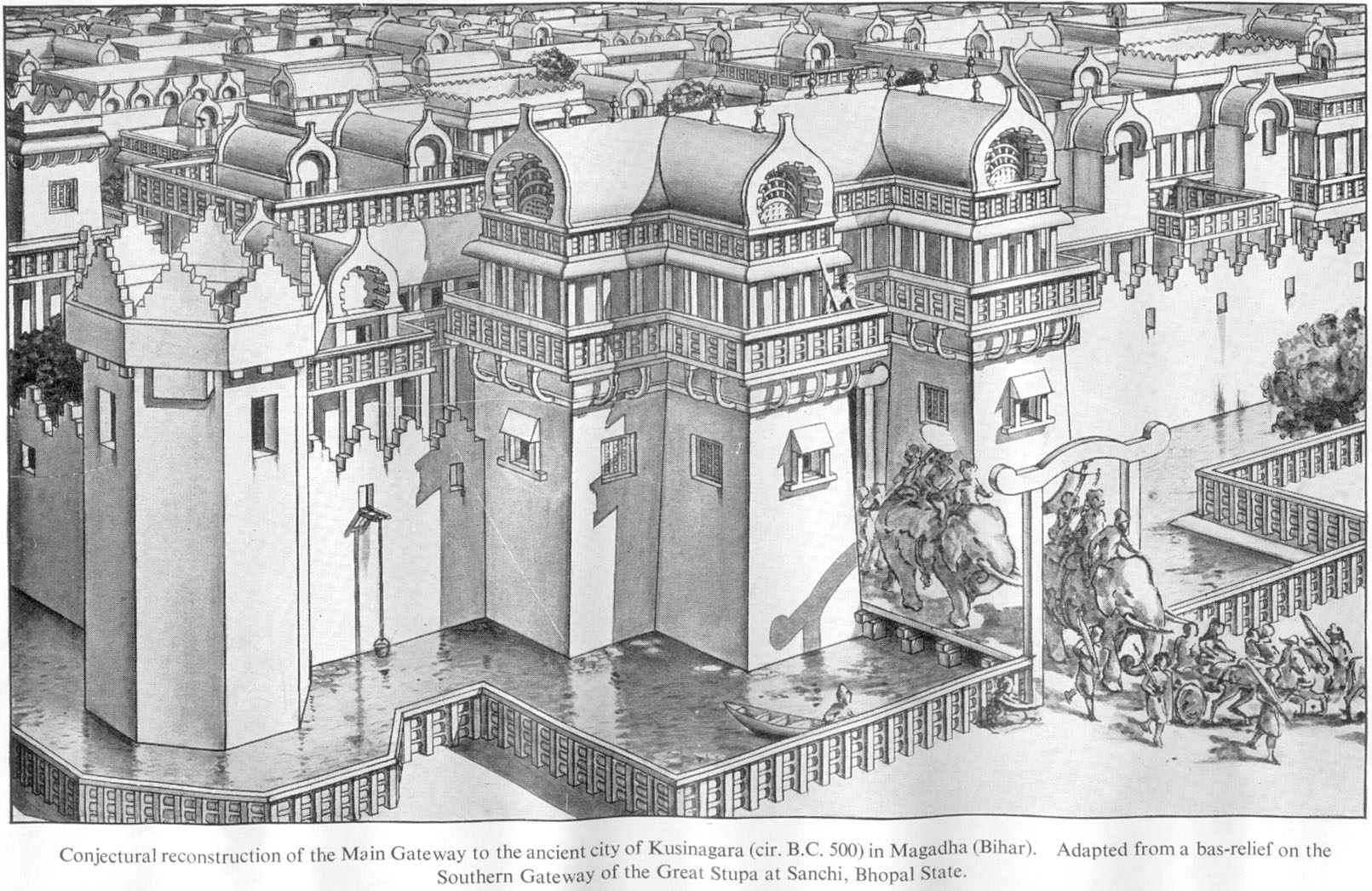
Conjectural reconstruction of the main gate of Kushinagar, city of the Mallakas, circa 500 BCE adapted from a relief at Sanchi.

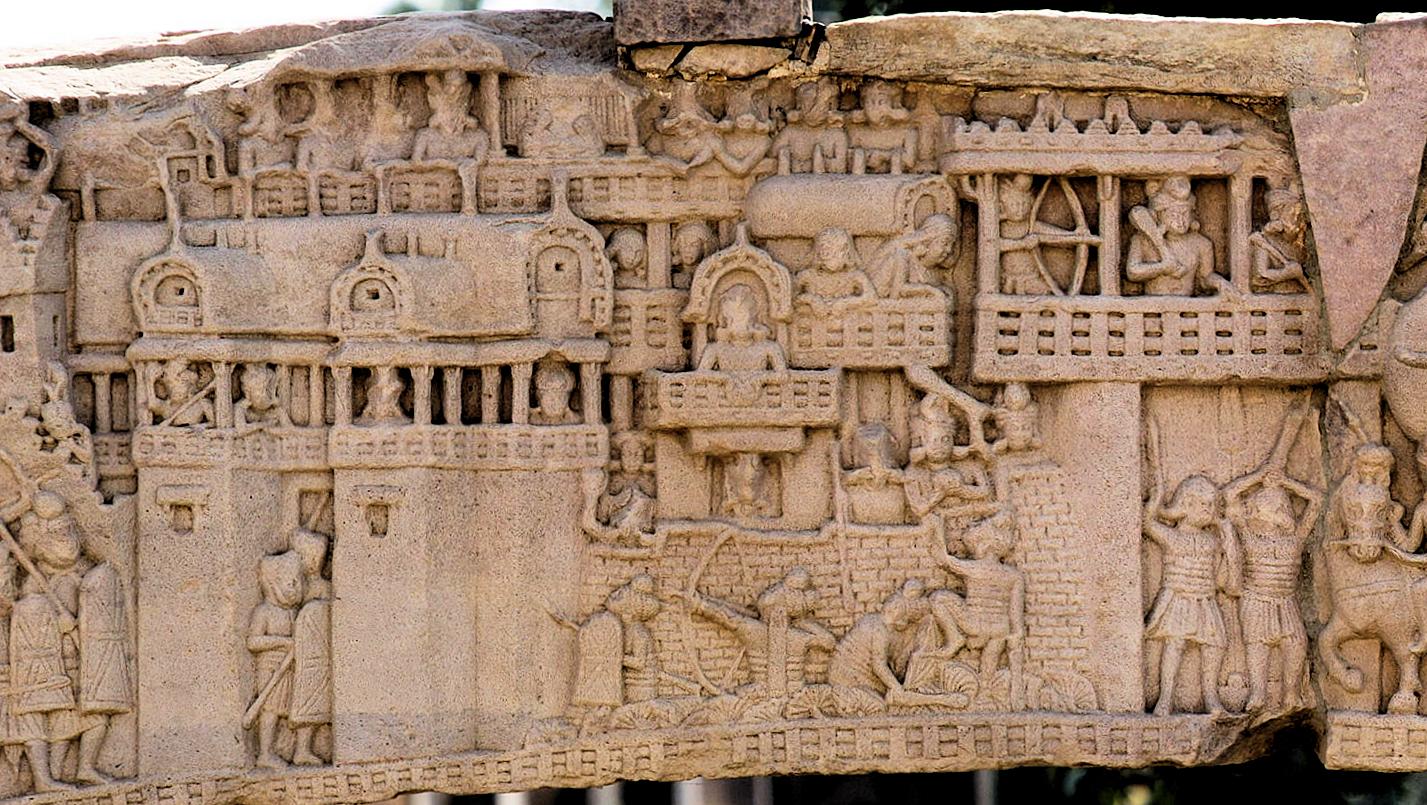
City of Kushinagar in the 5th century BCE according to a 1st-century BCE frieze in Sanchi Stupa 1 Southern Gate.

The Mallakas are frequently mentioned in Buddhist and Jain works. They were a powerful people dwelling in Northern India. According to Mahabharata, Panduputra Bhimasena is said to have conquered the chief of the Mallakas in the course of his expedition in Eastern India. During the Buddhist period, the Mallakas Kshatriya were a republican people with their dominion consisting of nine territories corresponding to the nine confederated clans. These republican states were known as gaṇasaṅghas. Two of these confederations – one with Kushinagar (modern Kasia near Gorakhpur) as its capital and the second with Pava (modern Fazilnagar, 20 kilometres (12 mi) southeast of Kushinagar) as the capital – had become very important at the time of Buddha. Kuśināra is very important in the history of Buddhism since Lord Buddha took last meal at Pava. Buddha was taken ill at Pava and died at Kusinara. It is widely believed that Lord Gautam died at the courtyard of King Sastipal Mall of Kushinagar. Kushinagar is now the centre of the Buddhist pilgrimage circle which is being developed by the tourism development corporation of Uttar Pradesh.

The Mallakas, like the Licchavis, are mentioned by Manusmriti as Vratya Kshatriyas. They are called Vasishthas (Vasetthas) in the Mahapparnibbana Suttanta. The Mallakas originally had a monarchical form of government but later they switched to one of Samgha (republican union), the members of which called themselves rajas. The Mallakas appeared to have formed an alliance with the Licchhavis for self-defense but lost their independence not long after Buddha's death and their dominions were annexed to the Magadhan empire.

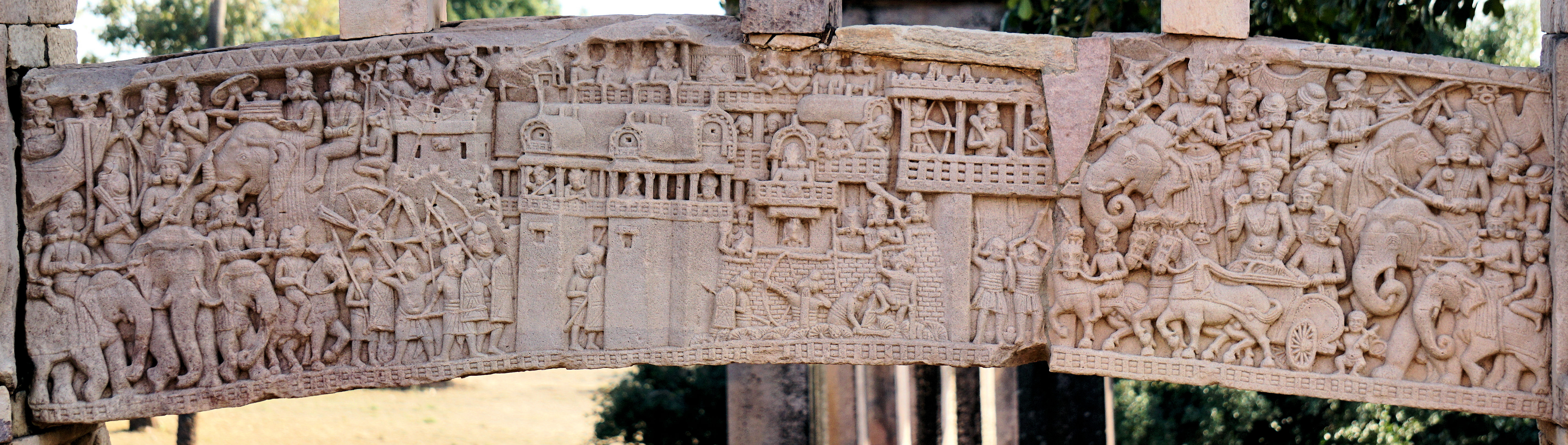
Mallaka defending the city of Kushinagar, as depicted at Sanchi. Malla was an ancient Indian republic (gaṇasaṅghas) mentioned in the Anguttara Nikaya.

=== Matsya ===
The country of the Matsya or Macchā tribe lay to the south of the Kurus and west of the Yamuna, which separated them from the Panchalas. It roughly corresponded to the former princely state of Jaipur in Rajputana, and included the whole of Alwar with portions of Bharatpur. The capital of Matsya was at Viratanagara (modern Bairat) which is said to have been named after its founder king Virata. In Pali literature, the Matsyas are usually associated with the Surasenas. The western Matsya was the hill tract on the north bank of the Chambal. A branch of Matsya is also found in later days in the Visakhapatnam region. The Matsyas had not much political importance of their own during the time of Buddha.

=== Pañcāla ===
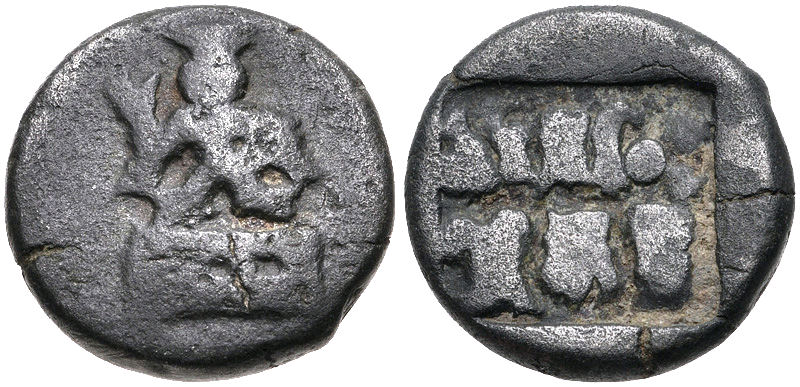
Coin of the Panchalas of Adhichhatra (75–50 BCE). Obv Indra seated facing on pedestal, holding bifurcated object. Rev Idramitrasa in Brahmi, Panchala symbols.

The Panchalas occupied the country to the east of the Kurus between the mountains and river Ganges. It roughly corresponded to modern Budaun, Farrukhabad and the adjoining districts of Uttar Pradesh. The country was divided into Uttara-Panchala and Dakshina-Panchala. The northern Panchala had its capital at Adhichhatra or Chhatravati (modern Ramnagar in the Bareilly district), while southern Panchala had its capital at Kampilya or Kampil in the Farrukhabad District. The famous city of Kanyakubja or Kanauj was situated in the kingdom of Panchala. Originally a monarchical clan, the Panchals appear to have switched to republican corporation in the 6th and 5th centuries BCE. In the 4th century BCE, Kautiliya's Arthashastra also attests the Panchalas as following the Rajashabdopajivin (king consul) constitution.

=== Śūrasena ===
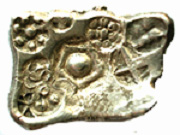
Silver coin of Surasena mahajanapada (5th century BCE).

The country of the Surasenas lay to the east of Matsya and west of Yamuna. This corresponds roughly to the Braj region of Uttar Pradesh, Haryana, Rajasthan, and Gwalior district of Madhya Pradesh. It had its capital at Madhura or Mathura. Avantiputra, the king of Surasena, was the first among the chief disciples of Buddha, through whose help Buddhism gained ground in Mathura country. The Andhakas and Vrishnis of Mathura/Surasena are referred to in the Ashtadhyayi of Pāṇini. In Kautiliya's Arthashastra, the Vrishnis are described as sangha or republic. The Vrishnis, Andhakas and other allied tribes of the Shoorsaini formed a sangha and Vasudeva (Krishna) is described as the sangha-mukhya. Mathura, the capital of Surasena, was also known at the time of Megasthenes as the centre of Krishna worship. The Surasena kingdom had lost its independence on annexation by the Magadhan empire.

=== Vajji ===
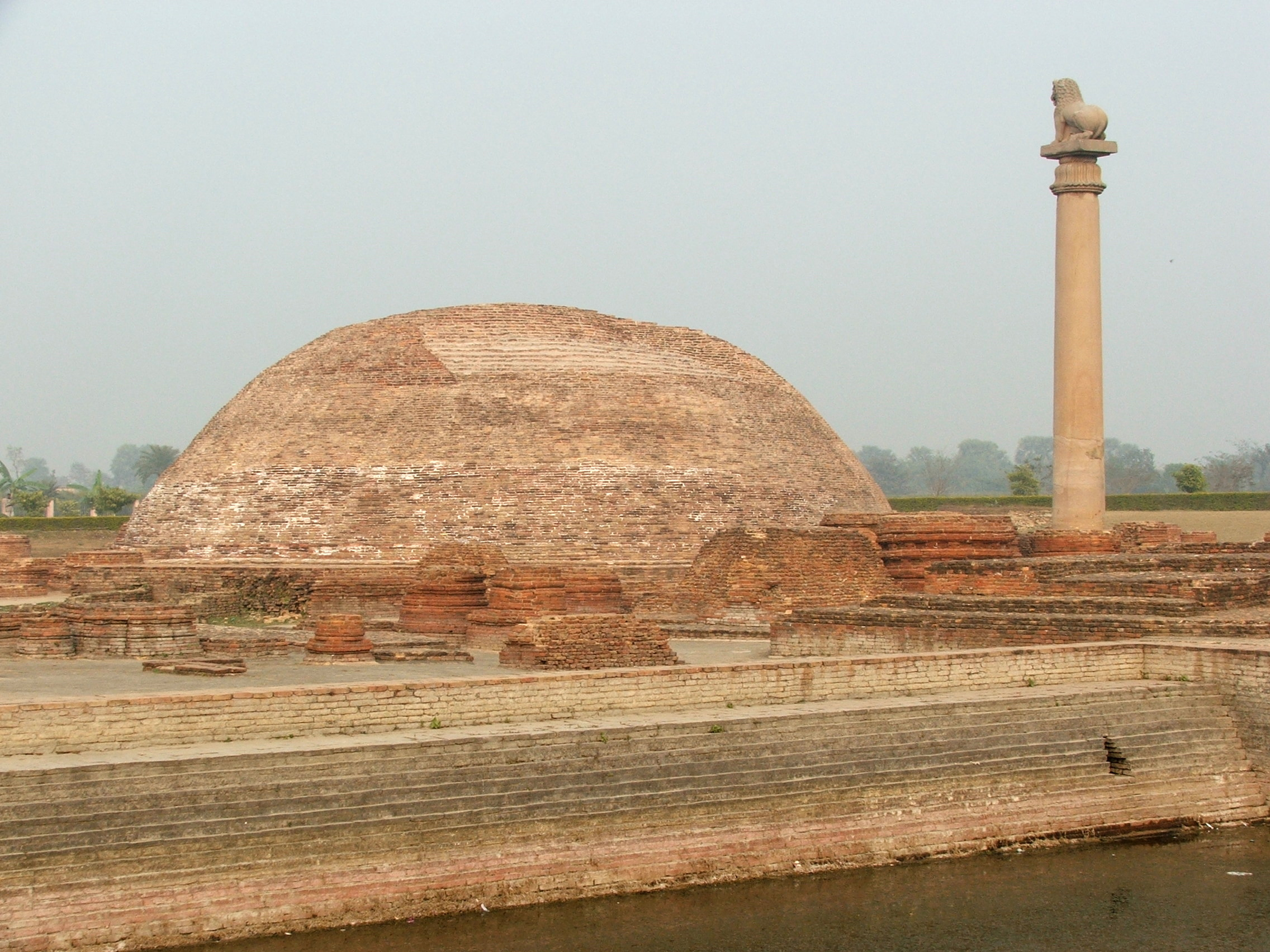
Ananda Stupa, built by the Licchavis at Vaishali, which served as the capital of the Vajjika League, one of the world's earliest republics (gaṇasaṅgha).

Vajji or Vṛji was a confederacy of neighbouring clans including the Licchavis and one of the principal mahājanapadas of ancient India. The area they ruled constitutes the region of Mithila in Nepal and northern Bihar and their capital was the city of Vaishali.

Both the Buddhist text Anguttara Nikaya and the Jaina text Bhagavati Sutra (Saya xv Uddesa I) included Vajji in their lists of solasa (sixteen) mahājanapadas. The name of this mahājanapada was derived from one of its ruling clans, the Vṛjis. The Vajji state is indicated to have been a republic. This clan is mentioned by Pāṇini, Chanakya and Xuanzang.

=== Vatsa (or Vaṃsa) ===
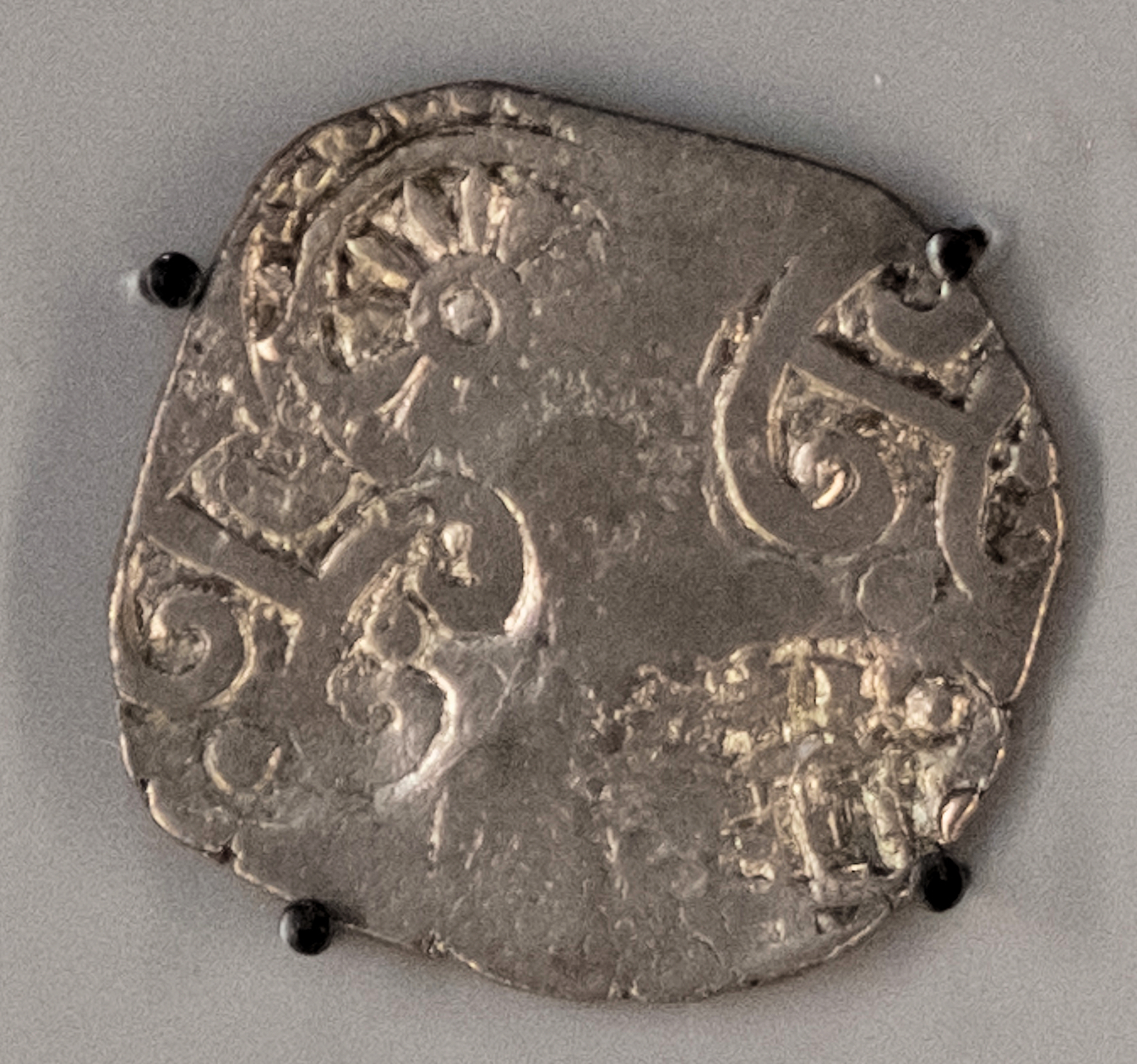
Vatsya coin (400-300 BCE)

The Vatsas or Vamsas are called to be a branch of the Kurus. The Vatsa or Vamsa country corresponded with the territory of modern Prayagraj in Uttar Pradesh. It had a monarchical form of government with its capital at Kausambi (identified with the village Kosam, 38 miles from Prayagraj). Kausambi was a very prosperous city where a large number of wealthy merchants resided. It was the most important entrepôt of goods and passengers from the north-west and south. Udayana was the ruler of Vatsa in the 6th–5th century BCE. He was very powerful, warlike and fond of hunting. Initially king Udayana was opposed to Buddhism, but later became a follower of Buddha and made Buddhism the state religion. Udayana's mother, Queen Mrigavati, is notable for being one of the earliest known female rulers in Indian history.

== See also ==
- Janapada
- Achaemenid conquest of the Indus Valley
- Indo-Aryan peoples
- List of ancient Indo-Aryan peoples and tribes
- Iron Age in India
- Magadha–Vajji war
