= John Woodroffe =

British orientalist (1865–1936)

Sir John Woodroffe
- In 1928. Portrait by James Lafayette
- Born: 15 December 1865; Calcutta, British India
- Died: 16 January 1936 (aged 70); Beausoleil, Alpes-Maritimes, France
- Other name: 'Arthur Avalon' (a shared pseudonym)
- Citizenship: United Kingdom
- Education: University College, Oxford
- Occupations: Lawyer; Orientalist
- Known for: The Serpent Power
- Parent(s): James Tisdall Woodroffe, Florence Woodroffe

Sir John George Woodroffe (15 December 1865 – 16 January 1936), also known by the pseudonym Arthur Avalon (in which he was assisted by several Indian scholars), was a British judge, art connoisseur and Orientalist whose extensive and complex published works on the Tantras, and other Hindu traditions, stimulated a wide-ranging interest in Hindu philosophy and yoga in the West.

== Early life ==
John Woodroffe was the eldest son of James Tisdall Woodroffe and his wife Florence, daughter of James Hume. James Woodroffe was Advocate-General of Bengal and Legal Member of the Government of India, a Justice of the Peace, and a Knight of St. Gregory. Young John was educated at Woburn Park School and the University College, Oxford, where he took second classes in jurisprudence and the Bachelor of Civil Law examinations.

== Career ==
He was called to the Bar by the Inner Temple in 1889, and in the following year was enrolled as an advocate of the Calcutta High Court. He was soon made a Fellow of the Calcutta University and appointed Tagore Law Professor. He collaborated with Ameer Ali in a widely used textbook, Civil Procedure in British India. He was appointed Standing Counsel to the Government of India in 1902, and in 1904 was raised to the High Court Bench. He served there for eighteen years, becoming Chief Justice in 1915. After retiring to England he served as Reader in Indian Law to the University of Oxford. At Oxford, he supervised the future Indian parliamentarian Seeta Parmanand's 1927 doctoral dissertation, "The Position of Women in Ancient India, as Represented by the Epics: The Rāmāyaṇa and the Mahābhārata," following the death of Parmanand's initial supervisor F. E. Pargiter.

== Sanskrit studies ==
Alongside his judicial duties, Woodroffe privately studied Sanskrit and Hindu philosophy, especially Hindu Tantra. According to the scholar Kathleen Taylor, Woodroffe relied heavily for his work on a group of Indian mentors, especially his close friend Atal Bihari Ghose. In particular, Ghose provided most of the knowledge of Sanskrit texts that Woodroffe's pseudonym 'Arthur Avalon' gave the semblance of possessing.

As 'Arthur Avalon', Woodroffe translated some 20 original Sanskrit texts, and published and lectured prolifically on Indian philosophy and a wide range of Yoga and Tantra topics. T.M.P. Mahadevan wrote:

By editing the original Sanskrit texts, as also by publishing essays on the different aspects of Shaktism, he showed that the religion and worship had a profound philosophy behind it, and that there was nothing irrational or obscurantist about the technique of worship it recommends."

The name Arthur Avalon was a play on the magical realm of Avalon and the young later-to-be, King Arthur, within the story-cycle of tales known generally as King Arthur and the Knights of the Round Table; specifically according to Taylor, Woodroffe chose the name from the noted incomplete magnum opus, the painting Arthur's Sleep in Avalon by Burne-Jones. Moreover, Taylor conveys the salience of this magical literary identity and contextualises by making reference to western esotericism, Holy Grail, quest, occult secrets, initiations and the Theosophists.

This is quite important to know, for here we have a writer on an Indian esoteric system taking a name imbued with western esotericism. The name at any rate seems to hint at initiations and the possession of occult secrets. The Arthurian legends are bound up with the story of the Holy Grail and its quest. This was a symbol of esoteric wisdom, especially to Theosophists who appropriated the legend. Anyone who named himself after King Arthur or the mystic isle of Avalon would be thought to be identifying himself with occultism, in Theosophists' eyes.

== Awards ==
Woodroffe was made a Knight Bachelor in the 1915 Birthday Honours awarded by King George V. The knighthood was conferred on him on June 18, 1915 in recognition of his judicial services as a Puisne Judge of the High Court of Judicature at Fort William in Bengal.

== Personal life ==
While off duty in India, he adopted Indian dress and lifestyle, as well as Indian nationalist views. He was reportedly initiated into a Tantric tradition.

Woodroffe was married to the concert pianist Ellen Elizabeth Grimson of the Grimson musical family from 1902. Lady Ellen was sister to Samuel Grimson, musician and inventor, once married to Malvina Hoffman and Bettina Warburg.

After a distinguished legal career as a judge and Chief Justice of the Calcutta High Court, and a period serving as a Reader in Indian Law at Oxford, he spent his final retirement years in France. He had briefly lived in Andelys, Normandy in France. He lived on a small island in the Seine River and had brought wood shipped from England to build the home. The house suffered from flooding and there were letters to Sir John's lawyers about moving his valuable and his 'Delage' sports car to safer storage. He eventually relocated to the South of France.

== Death ==
He died on 18 January 1936, aged 70. Woodroffe passed away at his residence, the Villa Aurelia in Beausoleil, Alpes-Maritimes, France where he had retired. Beausoleil is located in the southeastern region of France near the border of Monaco.

== Bibliography ==
His writings (published under his own name, as well as Arthur Avalon) include:

- Introduction to the Tantra Śāstra, ISBN 81-85988-11-0 (1913).
- Tantra of the Great Liberation (Mahānirvāna Tantra), ISBN 0-89744-023-4 (1913).
- Hymns to the Goddess (1913).
- Shakti and Shâkta, ISBN 81-85988-03-X (1918).
- The Serpent Power, ISBN 81-85988-05-6 (1919).
- Hymn to Kali: Karpuradi-Stotra. Luzac & Co., London. 1922.
- The World as Power, ISBN 1-4067-7706-4 (1922).
- The Garland of Letters. ISBN 81-85988-12-9 (1922).
- Principles of Tantra (2 vols) ISBN 81-85988-14-5.
- Kularnava Tantra (Introduction by John Woodroffe). ISBN 81-208-0972-6 (1965).
- Kamakalavilasa by Puṇyānanda.
- Bharati Shakti: Essays and Addresses on Indian Culture.
- India: Culture and Society.
- Is India Civilized? Essays on Indian Culture.

== Arms ==
Coat of arms of John Woodroffe
Notes Confirmed 2 November 1875 by Sir John Bernard Burke, Ulster King of Arms. Crest An open dexter hand between two branches of honeysuckle all Proper. Escutcheon Gules on a chevron Argent between three roses of the last barbed and seeded Proper as many stags' heads erased Sable a chief nebuly of the second charged with a trefoil slipped Vert. Motto Sit Dux Sapientia

There is another family crest with further detail and motto verified on the archives at the National Library of Ireland. https://catalogue.nli.ie/Record/vtls000529194

- Kali
- Mantra
- Yantra
