= Clarisse Bader =

French writer (1840–1902)

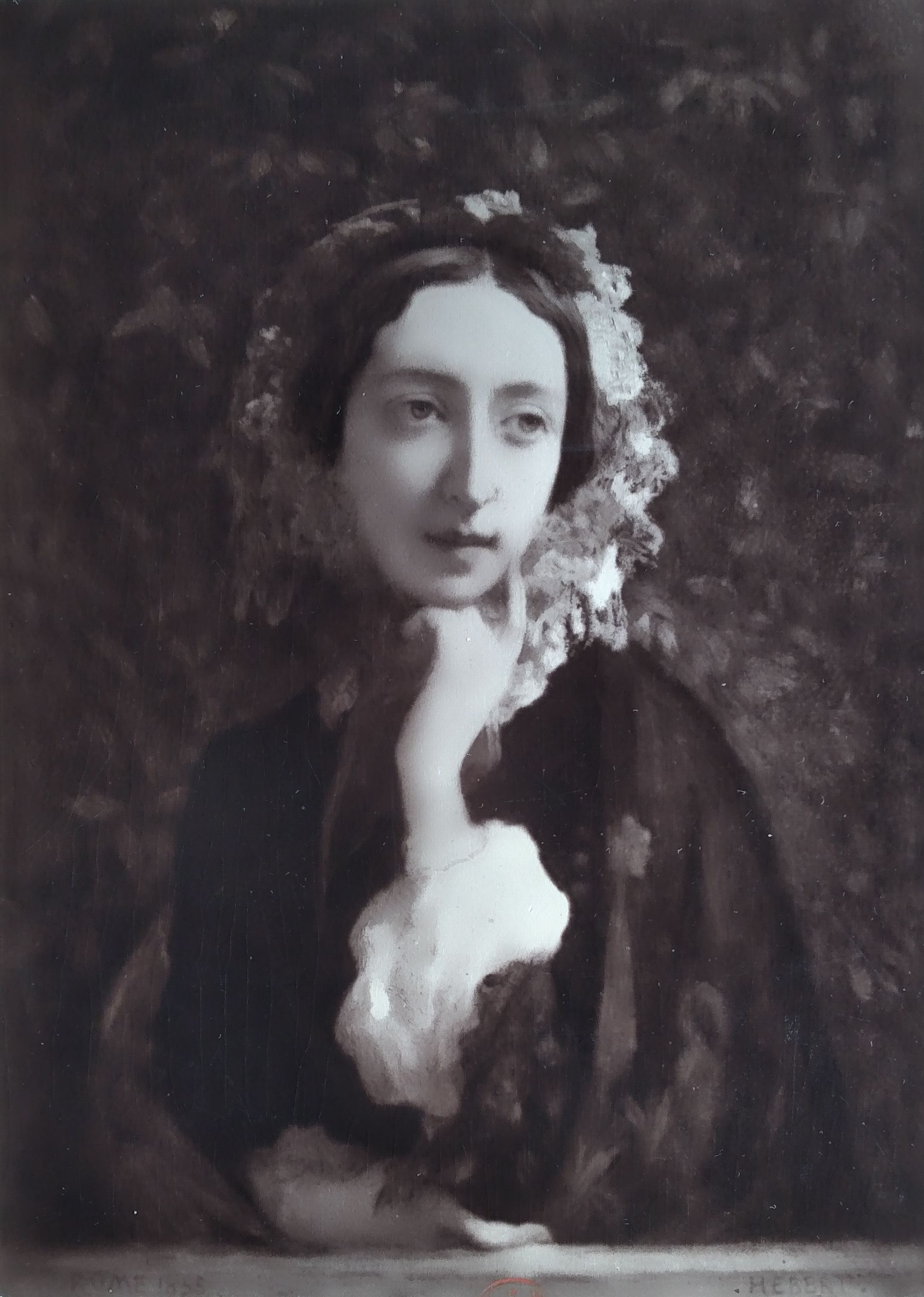
- Born: 28 December 1840; Strasbourg
- Died: 14 February 1902 (aged 61); Paris
- Occupations: Writer, historian, journalist
- Notable work: La Femme dans l'Inde Antique: Études Morales et Littéraires; Femme Grecque: Étude de la vie antique; La femme française dans les temps modernes

Clarisse Bader (28 December 1840 – 14 February 1902) was a French writer and historian.

She researched and wrote extensively on the role of women and their lives across antiquity, producing major studies on women's lives in Ancient Greece, India and Rome. She also wrote on women's lives in sixteenth century to eighteenth century France. Bader received four awards from the Académie française, including the Botta Prize for her complete body of work to date.

== Early life and education ==
Clarisse Bader was born on December 28, 1840, in Strasbourg. Her father, Daniel Michel Bader, was an Alsatian officer and the senior officer of the Military Quartermaster Corps. Her mother, Justine Frédérique Hardy, was from Frankenthal, Bavaria.

Bader received an unusually extensive education. She spoke English, German, and Italian, and was able to translate Latin and Greek. Such an education was uncommon among women of this period, who usually were unable to access secondary and higher education.

== Career ==
Bader began her first extensive project on the history of women at the age of 20. Her first significant publication, La Femme dans l'Inde Antique (The woman in ancient India), was published 1864, and recognised by the Académie française in the following year.

Bader primarily utilised literary, historical and religious texts for her research, rather than archival or archaeological methods, although this varied among the different societies she explored. For instance, her research for La Femme dans l'Inde Antique relied on existing translations of Indian texts and dramas. Many of her conclusions drew on Max Mueller’s views on Ancient India.

In 1877, Bader began correspondence with the Indian poet, novelist and translator, Toru Dutt. Dutt sought permission to translate La Femme dans l'Inde Antique into English, although Dutt's declining health meant she was unable to begin this task. Toru's father, Govin Chunder Dutt, sent a copied version of Toru's French manuscript, Le Journal de Mademoiselle d’Arvers to Bader. Bader assisted in getting the manuscript published posthumously through Didier in Paris in 1879 and also wrote the foreword for the novel. Dutt's friend Mary E. R. Martin published an English translation of La femme dans l'Inde antique in 1925. At St Anne's College, Oxford, the future parliamentarian Seeta Parmanand (née Ajgaonkar) cited Martin's translation in the introduction to her DPhil dissertation, "The Position of Women in Ancient India, as Represented by the Epics: The Rāmāyaṇa and the Mahābhārata."

She also published articles in various newspapers, especially on matters of women's history. She contributed articles to Le Correspondant, Le Journal des Débats and La Semaine des Familles.

== Social and religious views ==
Bader was a supporter of Monarchism and Patriotism, and raised as a Catholic in the tradition of social Catholicism. Her historical and social writings were influenced by her belief that women and men had differing societal roles and duties. While she advocated for improved education and employment opportunities for women, Bader did not support women's political emancipation. At the same time, she argued that education for women should prepare them for their moral and familiar responsibilities, and that paid employment should also be limited to occupation such as teaching. Her educational views were influenced by the works of Félix Dupanloup, a Catholic prelate who served as Bishop of Orléans and wrote extensively about education. Institutional records also reveal that Bader was a member of the Société Asiatique and served as a patron of an anti-slavery society, the Société antiesclavagiste de France.

== Personal life and death ==
Bader remained unmarried and financially contributed to her family household after her father was unable to continue working. She died on 14 February 1902 in Paris at the age of 61, leaving strict instructions to her friends to not place any flowers or wreaths at her funeral.

== Selected works ==
- La Femme dans l'Inde Antique: Études Morales et Littéraires (Women In Ancient India: Moral and Literary Studies) (1863)
- La Femme Biblique: Sa vie morale et sociale, sa participation au développement de l'idée religieuse (1866)
- Femme Grecque: Étude de la vie antique (Greek Woman: Study of Ancient Life) (1872)
- La femme française dans les temps modernes (The French woman in modern times) (1883)
- Le comte de Chambrun, ses Etudes politiques et litteraires (The Count of Chambrun, his political and literary studies) (1889)

== Awards ==
Bader won four prizes for her publications from the Académie française.

- 1864, Montyon Prize for La femme dans l’Inde antique: Études morales et littéraires (Women in Ancient India: Moral and Literary Studies).
- 1872, Montyon Prize for La femme grecque: Étude de la vie antique (Greek women: Study of Ancient Life).
- 1881, Botta Prize for Ensemble de son œuvre (for her entire body of work to date).
- 1863, Botta Prize for La femme française dans les temps modernes (The French Woman in Modern Times).
