= Seeta Parmanand =

Indian politician

- Parmanand ca. 1952 as a Member of the Indian Rajya Sabha

Member of Parliament, Rajya Sabha
- In office 1952–1964
- Constituency: Madhya Pradesh

Personal details
- Born: Seeta Narayan Ajgaonkar; 12 April 1901 Bombay Presidency, British India
- Died: 1979 (aged 78) New Delhi, Republic of India
- Party: Indian National Congress
- Education: University of Bombay (BA) University of Oxford (B.Litt., DPhil)

Seeta Narayan Parmanand (née Ajgaonkar; 1901 – 1979) was an Indian Sanskritist, lawyer, and politician. She was a Member of Parliament, representing Madhya Pradesh in the Rajya Sabha (the upper house of India's Parliament) as a member of the Indian National Congress.

A pioneer for women's rights, Parmanand made history in 1927 as the first student to earn a DPhil at St Anne's College, Oxford and likely the first Indian woman to pursue graduate studies in Sanskrit abroad. Her doctoral dissertation argued that Indian women had enjoyed greater freedom in Indian antiquity than in her present-day. She drew on this research in Parliament to advocate family law reform, playing a significant role in the passage of the Hindu Marriage Act, 1955 and other elements of the Hindu code bills.

== Early life and education ==
Seeta Parmanand was born in the Bombay Presidency of British India on April 12, 1901. In 1919, she became the first woman to receive the Jagannath Shankarshet Scholarship, awarded annually to the student who ranked first in the University of Bombay Sanskrit matriculation exams. In 1923, she graduated from Elphinstone College, University of Bombay with a B.A. in Sanskrit (honors) and English Literature.

In 1923, Parmanand was admitted to pursue a B.Litt. in Sanskrit at St Anne's College, Oxford (then the Society for Oxford Home-Students), one of five Oxford colleges accepting women at the time. The following year, she was granted Senior Status to pursue her DPhil in Sanskrit. Parmanand's father, Narayan Laxman Agaonkar, died before she completed her undergraduate studies; at the time of her admission to Oxford, she was listed as residing with relatives in Ratnagiri, Bombay.

At the Society, she was a contemporary of the Māori anthropologist Mākereti Papakura and the Indian literature scholar and independence activist Lotika Basu. Oxford had only begun granting degrees to women in 1920, and the Society was one of five Oxford colleges (alongside St Hugh's, Somerville, St Hilda's, and Lady Margaret Hall) to admit female students at the time. Parmanand's arrival also coincided with an influx of "foreign" students (Americans and Europeans) and "colonial" students (natives of European colonies) at the university. She actively protested differences in the treatment of these two groups. In 1924, she wrote to the Society's Principal, Christine Burrows, to object to a new rule that required Asian women students to deposit their funds at the university's Oriental Delegacy:

(1) It shows a want of confidence in our judgement and capacity to manage our affairs even after this age—the legally accepted age for majority and is this not rather humiliating?

(2) It implies a distinction is made in the treatment meted out to us and the other members of the Society—all of whom are supposed to stand on equal level. What about the other students—I mean foreign students eg. Americans, Dutch, etc.? Do they have a similar arrangement made for them? Then why should there be such a distinction in the status of the students only on the basis of Oriental and Occidental? … The liberal attitude of any society much more therefore of an educational society—as education, they say, broadens the mind—should be impartial towards all. Otherwise to what purpose are these leagues of nations … (which are encouraged by our society) if in such minor details and in ordinary everyday life we find distinctions made?

Do you not think that even these small things—small as they look—have a far-reaching effect on the minds of the persons concerned...

In 1926, Parmanand passed bar examinations in English and colonial constitutional law, legal history, Hindu and Muslim law, Roman law, and criminal law and procedure. She also attended the 1926 Women's Commonwealth Conference in London, pursued language training in German, and later took up French. Her DPhil was awarded in early 1927. The Society's Vice Principal gave the following description of her graduation: "Very dignified and attractive did this woman of modern India appear, in her blue 'sari,' surmounted by the blue and red gown. (The cap she needed only to carry in her hand, in accordance with a special concession made by the Vice-Chancellor for nuns and Indians wearing their native dress)."

== Sanskrit research ==
In 1924, Parmanand completed her B.Litt., "The Position of Women in Ancient India, as per the Dharmaśāstras," under the supervision of Arthur Anthony Macdonell, the third Boden Professor of Sanskrit. Her dissertation drew on thirteen Sanskrit law-books, including the Manusmṛti, a text that British Orientalists and jurists since William Jones (1746–94) had treated as the scriptural source of Hindu personal status (laws governing the family and property).

Parmanand's DPhil, "The Position of Women in Ancient India, as Represented by the Epics: The Rāmāyaṇa and the Mahābhārata," was supervised by F. E. Pargiter and, after Pargiter's death, by John Woodroffe. The Rāmāyaṇa and Mahābhārata, she insisted, "give us an estimate of woman's position in her family and in society rather than her legal status"—hence her turn from law-books to two epic poems belonging to the genre of itihāsa-purāṇa.

Orientalists and later Indian nationalists had divided India's past into Vedic and post-Vedic periods, the latter encompassing the composition of the epics, śāstras, and other texts in Classical Sanskrit. For these writers, the Vedic period represented the Golden Age of ancient India, while the post-Vedic period represented stagnation and decline. By emphasizing the epics over the vedās, Parmanand, like the nineteenth-century feminist-Sanskritist Pandita Ramabai, broke from this tendency to "romanticise" the Vedic period. Brahmins had declared the epics to be "the Veda for women and śūdras," she observed; the epics' relevance to women's spiritual lives lay precisely in their presumed inferiority.

According to Parmanand, the decline in the position of women in Indian society was neither the result of a mystic fall from the Vedic Golden Age, nor the fault of an alien invasion. Rather, it was a contingent development that had taken place during the epic period, a subset of the post-Vedic period that Parmanand divided as follows:

900 B.C.–400 B.C. The Bhārata Period, or the Heroic Age

400 B.C.–400 A.D. The Composition Period [identified with the smṛtis]

200 B.C.–400 A.D. The later Composition Period, or the Brahmanic Period

On these grounds, Parmanand broke with the French writer Clarisse Bader's La femme dans l'Inde antique (The woman in ancient India, 1864), which had argued that the status of Indian women fell into decline after the Vedic period and could only be reformed through conversion to Christianity. Parmanand wrote, "a comparison of the conclusion arrived at in this thesis and in Miss Bader's admirable work will show that they are different," for Bader's failure to distinguish between the epics, smṛtis, purāṇas, and other genres of post-Vedic literature "causes some confusion." Parmanand argued that the epics had gradually been "Brahmanised," or systematically modified to naturalize the supremacy of Brahmans over women and lower-caste Indians, during the course of the epic period. She offered the following conclusion:

It is very difficult to make statements which can cover the whole of the Epic Period, and … to draw accurate lines of demarcation; in spite of certain episodes being recognized as later additions [to the Epics], one can not locate them to exact dates. Fortunately, however, two divisions can be made…. The Brahmanic influence is so perceptible that with comparative certainty a dividing line can be drawn which distinguishes the heroic type of woman from a woman of the Brahmanic type.

She explicitly connected these conclusions to social and political reform, writing, in her introduction, "the conservative mind of the average Hindu is reluctant to take any step, bring out any reform, unless he is backed by his chapter and verse from the ancient Books." Hence the need to demonstrate that the present-day subjection of women through child-marriage, sati (immolation of widows), and other oppressive customs was neither inevitable nor natural.

== Return to India ==
In June 1927, facing financial difficulties and learning of the ill-health of her mother and sister, Parmanand returned to India. She married a Shri (Mr.) Parmanand of the Indian Civil Service later that year and arranged to be called to the bar and admitted to Lincoln's Inn in absentia.

Parmanand became a member of the All India Women's Conference and National Council of Women in India, two leading women's organizations of the time. Having moved to Madhya Pradesh, she was admitted to the Nagpur High Court, where she fought cases on behalf of women, children, and lower-caste Indians; she was later admitted as an advocate to the Supreme Court of India. Parmanand also took an active role in women's education, joining the boards of Nagpur University and Delhi University and founding an English high school for girls in Nagpur. From 1945–47, she served as Principal of the Indraprastha College for Women at Delhi University.

Parmanand's husband died before her election to Parliament.

== Parliamentary career ==
Parmanand was elected to the Rajya Sabha in its inaugural year, 1952, as a representative for Madhya Pradesh. A member of the Indian National Congress, she was one of 13 women in a legislative chamber of 216 members; others included Amrit Kaur, Violet Alva, Hannah Sen, Lakshmi N. Menon, and Mona Hensman.

Like other feminists of her generation, Parmanand supported the proposal for a Uniform Civil Code to reform family law for the entire country, ending the colonial-era system of separate personal status for Hindu, Muslim, Christian, Jewish, and Parsi 'blocs.' Enshrined as a directive principle in the Constitution of India by B. R. Ambedkar, this proposal failed after meeting staunch opposition from religious conservatives and Congress liberals concerned about alienating religious minorities. Jawaharlal Nehru's government subsequently broke up the proposed reforms into a series of bills applying only to the Hindu 'bloc': the Hindu Marriage Act, 1955, Hindu Succession Act, 1956, Hindu Minority and Guardianship Act, 1956, and Hindu Adoptions and Maintenance Act, 1956. Parmanand supported these Hindu code bills as an "overdue" "first step."

She emerged as a standout contributor in debates over the Hindu Marriage Act, 1955, first introduced in 1952 as the Hindu Marriage and Divorce Bill. Parmanand proposed various amendments, which included renaming the Bill to the ‘Hindu Marriage Bill’ (which passed), removing the phrase “restitution of conjugal rights,” an English common law precedent controversially applied in the Rukhmabai case that she viewed as “barbarous” (which failed), and preventing marriage from being instantly voidable if the wife was found to be pregnant with the child of a man other than her husband (which also failed, despite the joint efforts of Parmanand and two other women parliamentarians).

Parmanand explicitly drew on her Sanskrit research to defend this legislative agenda. In a 1952 legislative session, she explained, "this Bill should not be considered as dealing with anything that will be foreign either to the tenets of the Hindu religion or to the present society or the ancient tradition." When colleagues argued the reforms were not necessary because the Manusmṛti had already elevated women "to the highest pedestal," Parmanand cautioned, "the same Manu has said, pitā rakṣati kaumāre bhartā rakṣati yauvane. Putro rakṣati varddhakye na strī svātantryamarhati" (the father guards her in maidenhood, the brother, in adolescence, and the son, in old age; the woman is unworthy of independence). Hindu customs and law were "never static and... always dynamic," and could thus be transformed anew under the Code.

In subsequent debates, she explicitly challenged conservative colleagues who cast her and other feminists as unrepresentative of the Hindu 'bloc.' In December 1950, she addressed "the Hindu Mahasabhites, the [Bharatiya] Jan Sangh people and others" who opposed the bill "on orthodox grounds," as follows:

I would like to ask these people whether they are the only custodians of the Hindu religion…. Why do they think they alone have the monopoly of looking to the interests of the Hindu society? After all, members of this house, Members who are for this type of change, women, particularly of the well-known All-India Women's Organization, women of experience and ability, women who have always given their time for bringing in measures for the all-round betterment of their sisters, are equally interested in safeguarding the nature of Hindu society.

In 1954, when fellow Congress member and Madhya Pradesh representative Kanhaiyalal D. Vaidya accused Parmanand of wronging her community (samāj), a reference to the Hindu 'bloc,' Parmanand responded by expanding the meaning of samāj itself: "merā apnā koī samāj nahī hai. Merā samāj pūrā hindustānī samāj hai" (I have no community of my own. My community is the entire Indian community).

== Death ==
Parmanand died in late 1979. Her death was acknowledged by the Rajya Sabha in January 1980:

Dr. (Shrimati) Seeta Parmanand […] will however best be remembered for her part in seeing the Hindu Code Bill’s passage through Parliament in the teeth of opposition from several members, including those of her own party. She served as a member of the Rajya Sabha from 1952 to 1958 and again from 1958 to 1964, and her views were always heard with respect in the House.
