= Pushkari =

Set index of articles associated with the same name

Pushkari (Russian: Пушкари) is the name of several rural localities in Russia:

- Pushkari, Bryansk Oblast, a village in Moskovsky Selsoviet of Pochepsky District of Bryansk Oblast
- Pushkari, Kirov, Kirov Oblast, a village under the administrative jurisdiction of Oktyabrsky City District of the City of Kirov, Kirov Oblast
- Pushkari, Slobodskoy District, Kirov Oblast, a village in Shestakovsky Rural Okrug of Slobodskoy District of Kirov Oblast
- Pushkari, Lipetsk Oblast, a selo in Pushkarsky Selsoviet of Usmansky District of Lipetsk Oblast
- Pushkari, Mari El Republic, a village in Pektubayevsky Rural Okrug of Novotoryalsky District of the Mari El Republic
- Pushkari, Perm Krai, a village in Nytvensky District of Perm Krai
- Pushkari, Ryazan Oblast, a selo in Shchetininsky Rural Okrug of Mikhaylovsky District of Ryazan Oblast
- Pushkari, Smolensk Oblast, a village in Loinskoye Rural Settlement of Smolensky District of Smolensk Oblast
- Pushkari, Tambov Oblast, a selo in Streletsky Selsoviet of Tambovsky District of Tambov Oblast
- Pushkari, Kireyevsky District, Tula Oblast, a village in Dedilovsky Rural Okrug of Kireyevsky District of Tula Oblast
- Pushkari, Novomoskovsky District, Tula Oblast, a village in Krasnobogatyrsky Rural Okrug of Novomoskovsky District of Tula Oblast
- Pushkari, Yefremovsky District, Tula Oblast, a village in Pushkarsky Rural Okrug of Yefremovsky District of Tula Oblast
- Pushkari, Udmurt Republic, a village in Pushkarevsky Selsoviet of Yakshur-Bodyinsky District of the Udmurt Republic
