= Suktimati =

Mythological river and city in Hindu texts

Shuktimati (Sanskrit: शुक्तिमती, romanized: Śuktimatī) is the capital city of the Chedi kingdom featured in Hindu literature. It lies on the banks of the eponymous river Shuktimati, which flows through the region. It is referred to as Sotthivati-nagara in the Pali-language Buddhist texts.

== Legend ==
Shuktimati is described to have been built by a Chedi king of the Chandravamsha (Lunar dynasty) known as Uparichara Vasu. The Mahabharata states that the river Shuktimati gives birth to twins (a boy and a girl) after being forced to make love with a mountain called Kolahala. After being freed by the king with a kick, the river gives the twins to him. Uparichara Vasu makes the boy the commander of his armies and marries the girl, Girika.

== Identification ==
The location of Suktimati has not been established with certainty. Historian Hem Chandra Raychaudhuri and F. E. Pargiter believed that it was in the vicinity of Banda, Uttar Pradesh. Archaeologist Dilip Kumar Chakrabarti has proposed that Suktimati can be identified as the ruins of a large early historical city, at a place with the modern-day name Rewa, Madhya Pradesh.
