= F. E. Pargiter =

Frederick Eden Pargiter
- Born: 1852
- Died: 18 February 1927 (age 75); Oxford, United Kingdom
- Occupations: civil servant, judge, antiquarian

Frederick Eden Pargiter (1852–18 February 1927) was a British civil servant, high court judge and Orientalist.

Born in 1852, Pargiter was the second son of Rev. Robert Pargiter. He studied at Taunton Grammar School and Exeter College, Oxford where he passed in 1873 with a first-class in mathematics. Pargiter passed the Indian Civil Service examinations and embarked for India in 1875.

Pargiter served in India from 1875 to 1906 becoming Under-Secretary to the Government of Bengal in 1885, District and Sessions Court judge in 1887 and a judge of the Calcutta High Court in 1904. Pargiter voluntarily retired in 1906 following the death of his wife and returned to the United Kingdom.

Pargiter died at Oxford on 18 February 1927 in his seventy-fifth year. At the time, he was supervising the future Indian parliamentarian Seeta Parmanand's doctoral dissertation, "The Position of Women in Ancient India, as Represented by the Epics: The Rāmāyaṇa and the Mahābhārata."

In his Ancient Indian Historical Tradition, taking the accession of Chandragupta Maurya in 321 BC as his reference point, Pargiter dated the Battle of Kurukshetra to 950 BC assigning an average of 14.48 years for each king mentioned in the Puranic lists.

== Works ==
- Pargiter, F. E. (1904). The Markandeya-Puranam Sanskrit Text English Translation with Notes and Index of Verses. The Asiatic Society (57, Park Street).
- Pargiter, F. E. (1920). A Revenue History of the Sundarbans from 1870 to 1920. Calcutta: Bengal Board of Revenue.
- Pargiter, F. E. (1922). Ancient Indian Historical Tradition. London: Oxford University Press.
