= Gandhara grave culture =

Archaeological culture of modern-day Pakistan

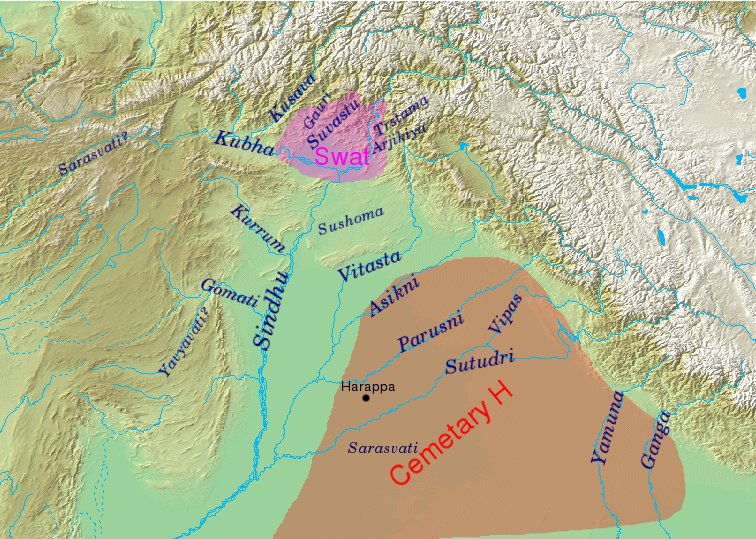
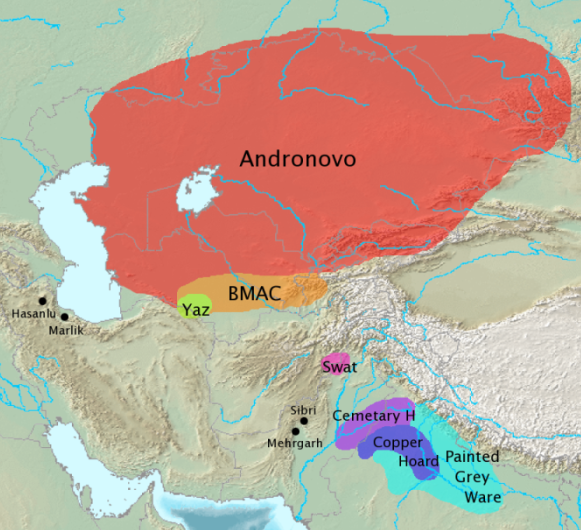
- Maps showing (1) Geography of the Rigveda with river names and the extent of the Swat and Cemetery H cultures; (2) Archaeological cultures associated with Indo-Iranian migrations (after EIEC). The Andronovo, BMAC, and Yaz cultures have often been associated with Indo-Iranian migrations. The GGC (Swat), Cemetery H, Copper Hoard, and PGW cultures are candidates for cultures associated with Indo-Aryan migrations.
- Period: c. 1400–800 BCE
- Type site: Swat Protohistoric Graveyards Complex

The Gandhara grave culture of present-day Pakistan is known by its "protohistoric graves", which were spread mainly in the middle Swat River valley and named the Swat Protohistoric Graveyards Complex, dated in that region to c. 1400–800 BCE. The Italian Archaeological Mission to Pakistan (MAIP) holds that there are no burials with these features after 800 BCE. More recent studies by Pakistani scholars, such as Muhammad Zahir, consider that these protohistoric graves extended over a much wider geography and continued in existence from the 8th century BCE until the historic period. The core region was in the middle of the Swat River course and expanded to the valleys of Dir, Kunar, Chitral, and Peshawar. Protohistoric graves were present in north, central, and southern Khyber Pakhtunkhwa province as well as in north-western tribal areas, including Gilgit-Baltistan province, Taxila, and Salt Range in Punjab, Pakistan, along with their presence in Indian Kashmir, Ladakh, and Uttarakhand.

The grave culture has been regarded as a token of the Indo-Aryan migrations but has also been explained by local cultural continuity. Estimates, based on ancient DNA analyses, suggest ancestors of middle Swat valley people mixed with a population coming from the Inner Asian Mountain Corridor, which carried Steppe ancestry, sometime between 1900 and 1500 BCE.

== Location and characteristics ==
Close to the end of the second millennium BCE, large graveyards appear in northern Gandhara (middle Swat River valley), featuring mainly inhumations (c. 1200–900 BCE), the so-called Gandhara grave culture by earlier scholars, a period in which iron technology was introduced. These graveyard types expanded to the northwest into Chitral, around Singoor, featuring burial traditions similar to protohistoric graves between the 8th century BCE and 17th century CE.

A constant funeral tradition with pottery and similar artifacts can be found along the banks of the Swat and Dir rivers in the north, Chitral, and the Vale of Peshawar. Simply-made terracotta figurines were buried with the pottery, and other items are decorated with simple dot designs.

Re-evaluation of the findings suggests this so-called Gandhara Grave Culture was actually a burial tradition, spread across a wide geographical area, rather than a specific culture. There are more than thirty cemeteries of this tradition found in Swat and the surrounding valleys of Dir, Buner, Malakand, Chitral, and in the Valley of Peshawar to the south, featuring cist graves, where large stone slabs were used to line the pit, above which another large flat stone was laid, forming a roof. Related settlement sites have also been found, increasing our knowledge of the culture.

Anthropomorphic urns with cremation remains were not frequently found in graves, and the most common pottery within these graves is Burnished Grey Ware and Burnished Red Ware, along with human terracotta figurines. However, later graves are more elaborate, featuring more items, including horse remains and horse furniture.

== Origins ==
Northern Gandhara, in the middle region of the Swat River, presents deposits of Black Burnished Ware, prior to the Gandhara grave culture, during the Ghalegay IV period, c. 1700–1400 BCE. New research, based on 34 excavated graves in Udegram, and in the nearby site of Gogdara, has uncovered two Gandhara grave culture burial phases, the first between 1400 and 1100 BCE, and the second from 1000 to 800 BCE, with an inter-phase in Gogdara, from 1200 to 900 BCE.

Single burials are characteristic of the early phase of Gandhara grave culture, along with bronze objects and pottery within the graves. Cremation is distinctive in the middle phase, and ashes were laid in large jars, often bearing a human-like face design. These jars were frequently placed in circular pits, surrounded by objects of bronze, gold, and pottery. Multiple burials and fractional remains are found in the later phase, along with iron objects, coeval with the beginning of urban centers of Taxila and Charsadda.

=== Indo-Aryan migrations ===
The polished black-gray pottery has been associated with that of other BMAC sites, like Dashly in Afghanistan, Tepe Hissar, and Tureng Tepe. According to Asko Parpola, the presence of black-red pottery also suggests links with Cemetery H culture in Punjab. The burial of bodies, the metal pins used for fastening clothes, and the terracotta statuettes of females, says Parpola, are similar to those found at BMAC. Graves during the Ghalegay V period, c. 1400–1000 BCE, may be connected with those in Vakhsh and Bishkent Valley. Parpola adds that these graves represent a mix of the practices found in the northern Bactrian portion of BMAC, during the period of 1700–1400 BCE and the Fedorovo Andronovo culture.

According to Upinder Singh, the Gandhara grave culture is similar to the one in the Ghalegay caves during their V, VI, and VII phases. Rajesh Kochhar says it may be associated with early Indo-Aryan speakers as well as the Indo-Aryan migration into the Indian subcontinent, which came from the Bactria–Margiana region. According to Kochhar, the Indo-Aryan culture fused with indigenous elements of the remnants of the Indus Valley civilization (OCP, Cemetery H) and gave rise to the Vedic Civilization.

=== Cultural continuity ===
Parpola has argued that the Gandhara grave culture is "by no means identical with the Bronze Age Culture of Bactria and Margiana". According to Tusa, the Gandhara grave culture and its new contributions are "in line with the cultural traditions of the previous period". According to Parpola, in the centuries preceding the Gandhara culture, during the Early Harappan period (roughly 3200–2600 BCE), similarities in pottery, seals, figurines, ornaments, etc. document intensive caravan trade between the Indian subcontinent, Central Asia, and the Iranian plateau. Tusa remarks that

... to attribute a historical value to [...] the slender links with northwestern Iran and northern Afghanistan [...] is a mistake[, since] it could well be the spread of particular objects and, as such, objects that could circulate more easily quite apart from any real contacts.

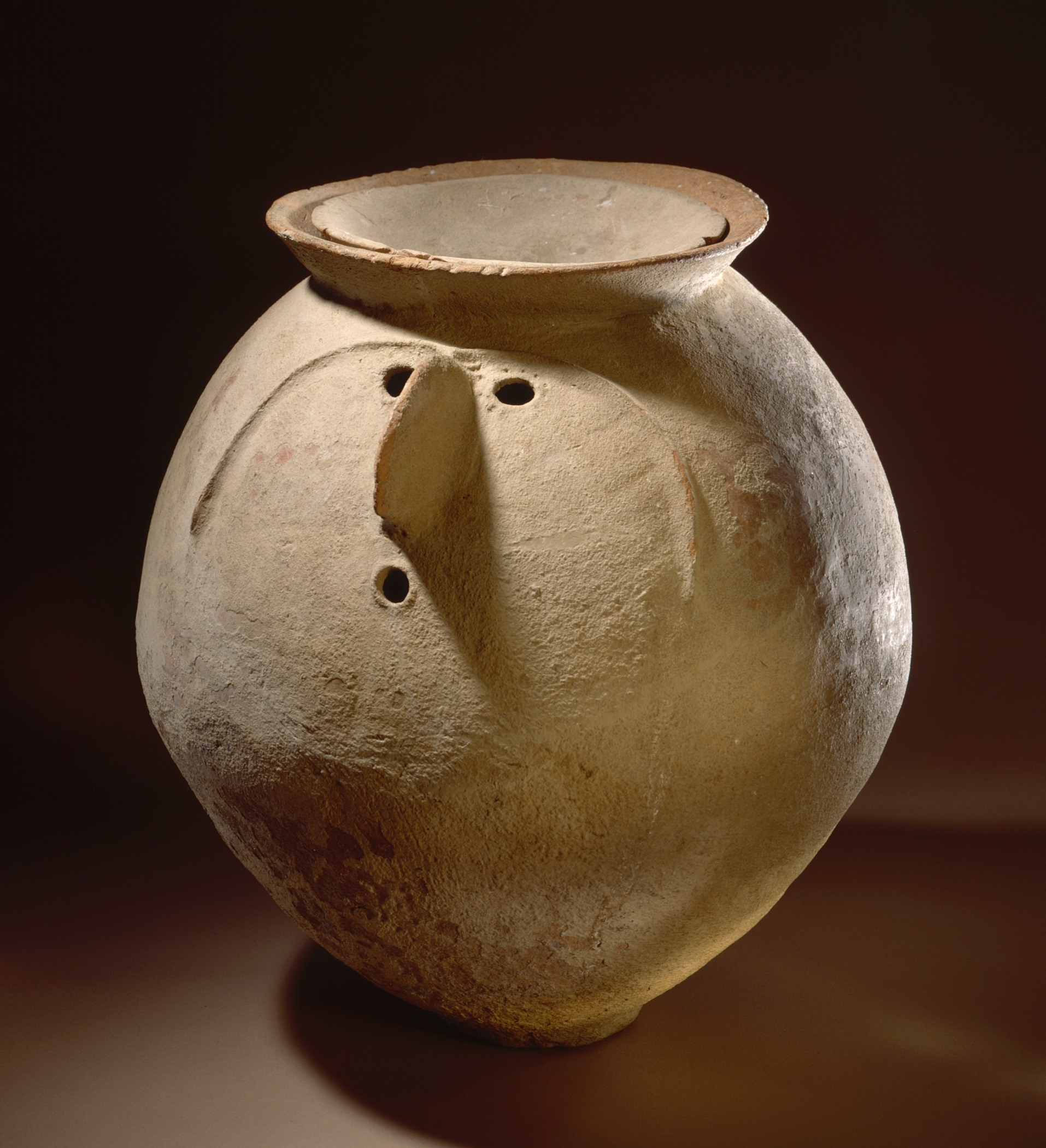
Cremation urn

According to Kennedy, who argues for local cultural continuity, Gandhara grave culture people shared biological affinities with the population of Neolithic Mehrgarh. This suggests a "biological continuum" between the ancient populations of Timargarha and Mehrgarh. This is contested by Elena E. Kuz'mina, who notes remains that are similar to some from Central Asian populations.

Antonini, Stacul, and other scholars argue that this culture is also not related to the Bishkent culture and Vakhsh culture of Tajikistan. However, Kuz'mina argues the opposite on the basis of both archaeology and the human remains from the separate cultures.

== Genetics ==
Narasimhan et al., 2018, analyzed DNA of 362 ancient skeletons from Central and South Asia, including those from the Iron Age grave sites discovered in the Swat valley of Pakistan (between 1200 BCE and 1 CE from Aligrama, Barikot, Butkara, Katelai, Loe Banr, and Udegram). According to them, the "Indus Periphery-related people" are "genetically similar to post-IVC groups in the Swat Valley of Pakistan" and "are the single most important source of ancestry in South Asia". They further state that "there is no evidence that the main BMAC population contributed genetically to later South Asians". Instead, the Swat valley grave DNA analysis provides further evidence of "Steppe MLBA ancestry being integrated into South Asian groups in the 2nd millennium BCE" and that the later samples from the region from "the 1st millennium BCE had higher proportions of Steppe and AASI derived ancestry more similar to that found on the Indian Cline".

== See also ==
- Pottery in the Indian subcontinent
- Chust culture

== Sources ==
- Bryant, Edwin (2001), The Quest for the Origins of Vedic culture, Oxford University Press, ISBN 0-19-513777-9
- Kochhar, Rajesh (2000), The Vedic People: Their History and Geography, Sangam Books
- Müller-Karpe, Hermann (1983), Jungbronzezeitlich-früheisenzeitliche Gräberfelder der Swat-Kultur in Nord-Pakistan, Beck, ISBN 3-406-30154-1
- Parpola, Asko (1993), "Margiana and the Aryan Problem", International Association for the Study of the Cultures of Central Asia Information Bulletin 19:41-62
- Tusa, Sebastiano (1977), "The Swat Valley in the 2nd and 1st Millennia BC: A Question of Marginality", South Asian Archaeology 6:675-695
