= Vedic period =

Ancient South Asian historical period

Early Vedic period
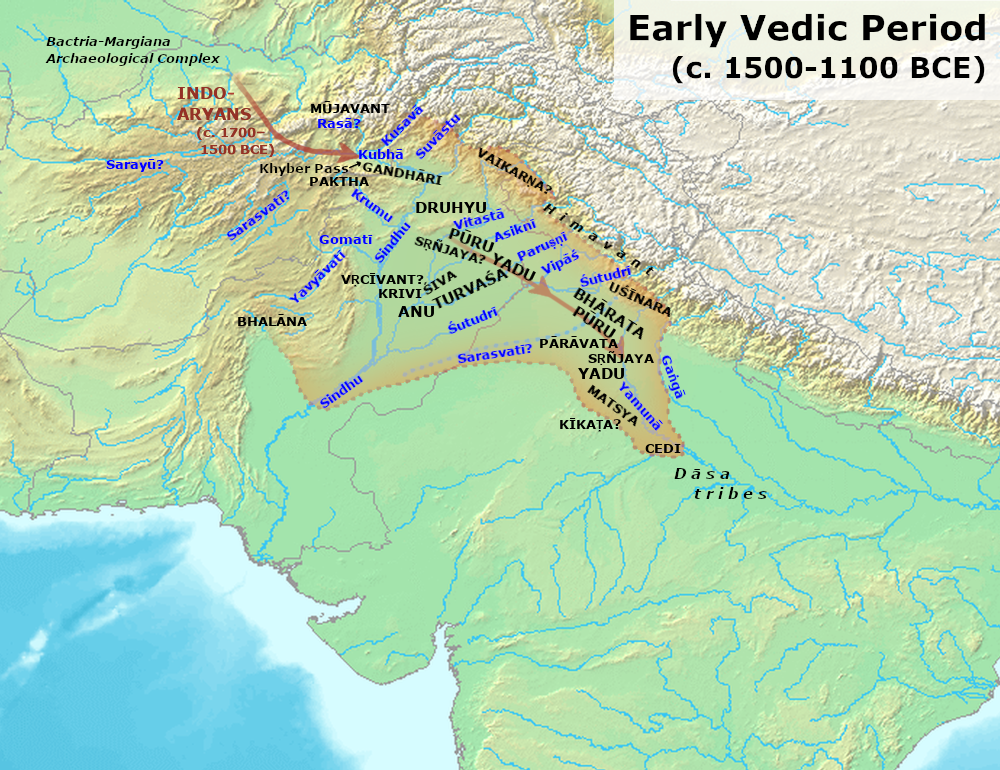
- Geographical range: South Asia
- Period: Bronze Age India
- Dates: 1500–1100 BCE
- Preceded by: Cemetery H culture; Ochre Coloured Pottery culture; Painted Grey Ware culture
- Followed by: Late Vedic Period; Kuru kingdom; Panchala; Videha

Late Vedic period
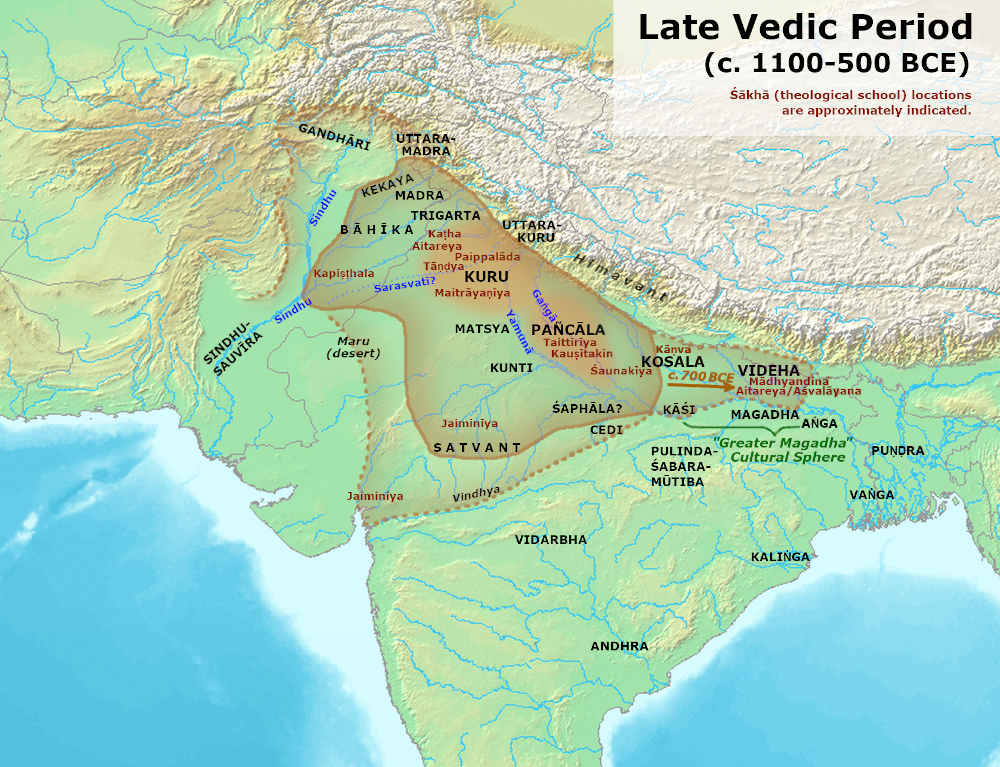
- Geographical range: Indian subcontinent
- Period: Iron Age India
- Dates: c. 1100 – c. 500 BCE
- Preceded by: Early Vedic culture
- Followed by: Haryanka dynasty, Mahajanapadas

The Vedic period, or the Vedic age (c. 1500 – c. 500 BCE), is the period in the late Bronze Age and early Iron Age of the history of India when the Vedic literature, including the Vedas (c. 1500–900 BCE), was composed in the northern Indian subcontinent, between the end of the urban Indus Valley Civilisation and a second urbanisation, which began in the central Indo-Gangetic Plain c. 600 BCE. The Vedas are liturgical texts which formed the basis of the influential Brahmanical ideology, which developed in the Kuru kingdom, a tribal union of several Indo-Aryan tribes. The Vedas contain details of life during this period that have been interpreted to be historical (Note: McClish & Olivelle 2012, p. xxiv: "Although the Vedas are essentially liturgical documents and increasingly mystical reflections on Vedic ritual, they are sufficiently rich and extensive to give us some understanding of what life was like at the time. The earliest of the Vedas, the Ṛgveda Saṃhitā, contains 1,028 hymns, some of which may be as old as 1500 BCE. Because the Vedic texts are the primary way in which we can understand the period between the fall of the IVC (ca 1700) and the second wave of urbanization (600 BCE), we call the intervening era of South Asian history the 'Vedic Period.'") and constitute the primary sources for understanding the period. These documents, alongside the corresponding archaeological record, allow for the evolution of the Indo-Aryan and Vedic culture to be traced and inferred.

The Vedas were composed and orally transmitted with precision (Note: "The Vedic texts were orally composed and transmitted, without the use of script, in an unbroken line of transmission from teacher to student that was formalised early on. This ensured an impeccable textual transmission superior to the classical texts of other cultures; it is, in fact, something like a tape-recording of ca. 1500–500 BCE. Not just the actual words, but even the long-lost musical (tonal) accent (as in old Greek or in Japanese) has been preserved up to the present") by speakers of an Old Indo-Aryan language who had migrated into the northwestern regions of the Indian subcontinent early in this period. (Note: See: Singh 2008, p. 186: "The original homeland of the Indo-Europeans and Indo-Aryans is the subject of continuing debate among philologists, linguists, historians, archaeologists and others. The dominant view is that the Indo-Aryans came to the subcontinent as immigrants. Another view, advocated mainly by some Indian scholars, is that they were indigenous to the subcontinent."; As of 2006, Mallory & Adams 2006, pp. 460–461 note that two types of models "enjoy significant international currency" as to the Indo-European homeland, namely the Anatolian hypothesis, and a migration out of the Eurasian steppes.; Bryant 2001, p. 7: "This does not mean that the Indigenous Aryan position is historically probable. The available evidence by no means denies the normative view—that of external Aryan origins and, if anything, favors it." Bryant & Patton 2005, p. 342 used the term "Indo-Aryan Controversy" for an oversight of the Indo-Aryan Migration theory, and some of its opponents.; Witzel 2001: "The 'revisionist project' certainly is not guided by the principles of critical theory but takes, time and again, recourse to pre-enlightenment beliefs in the authority of traditional religious texts such as the Purånas. In the end, it belongs, as has been pointed out earlier, to a different 'discourse' than that of historical and critical scholarship. In other words, it continues the writing of religious literature, under a contemporary, outwardly 'scientific' guise. Though the ones pursuing this project use dialectic methods quite effectively, they frequently also turn traditional Indian discussion methods and scholastic tricks to their advantage [...] The revisionist and autochthonous project, then, should not be regarded as scholarly in the usual post-enlightenment sense of the word, but as an apologetic, ultimately religious undertaking aiming at proving the 'truth' of traditional texts and beliefs. Worse, it is, in many cases, not even scholastic scholarship at all but a political undertaking aiming at 'rewriting' history out of national pride or for the purpose of 'nation building'."; In her review of Bryant's "The Indo-Aryan Controversy," Jamison 2006 comments: "...the parallels between the Intelligent Design issue and the Indo-Aryan "controversy" are distressingly close. The Indo-Aryan controversy is a manufactured one with a non-scholarly agenda, and the tactics of its manufacturers are very close to those of the ID proponents mentioned above. However unwittingly and however high their aims, the two editors have sought to put a gloss of intellectual legitimacy, with a sense that real scientific questions are being debated, on what is essentially a religion-nationalistic attack on a scholarly consensus.") The Vedic society was patriarchal and patrilineal. (Note: See: Rita Banerji (2008), Sex and Power, Penguin UK: "The Vedic patriarchal culture was defined by an extremely aggressive need to establish a social order that catered to male sexuality, both on earth and in the heavens—among humans and also among the gods."; Alphonso Lingis (2018), The Alphonso Lingis Reader, University of Minnesota Press: "Patriarchal culture entered Siam late, through the royal family, which, though to this day Buddhist, in the late Sukhothai period—as Angkor long before it—imported brahminical priests and, with them, Vedic patriarchal culture."; Chitrabhanu Sen (1978), A Dictionary of the Vedic Rituals: Based on the Śrauta and Gṛhya Sūtras, Concept Publishing Company: "But the most important transformation that occurred in the patriarchal Vedic society is the exclusion of women from the sacrifices.") Early Indo-Aryans were a Late Bronze Age society centred in the Punjab, organised into tribes rather than kingdoms, and primarily sustained by a pastoral way of life.

Around c. 1200–1000 BCE the Aryan culture spread eastward to the fertile western Ganges Plain. Iron tools were adopted, which allowed for the clearing of forests and the adoption of a more settled, agricultural way of life. The second half of the Vedic period was characterised by the emergence of towns, kingdoms, and a complex social differentiation distinctive to India, and the Kuru kingdom's codification of orthodox sacrificial ritual. During this time, the central Ganges Plain was dominated by a related but non-Vedic Indo-Aryan culture, of Greater Magadha. The end of the Vedic period witnessed the rise of true cities and large states (called mahajanapadas) as well as śramaṇa movements (including Jainism and Buddhism) which challenged the Vedic orthodoxy.

The Vedic period saw the emergence of a hierarchy of social classes that would remain influential. Vedic religion developed into Brahmanical orthodoxy, and around the beginning of the Common Era, the Vedic tradition formed one of the main constituents of "Hindu synthesis".

Archaeological cultures identified with phases of Indo-Aryan material culture include the Ochre Coloured Pottery culture (OCP), the Gandhara grave culture, the Black and Red ware culture (BRW) and the Painted Grey Ware culture (PGW).

== History ==
=== Origins ===
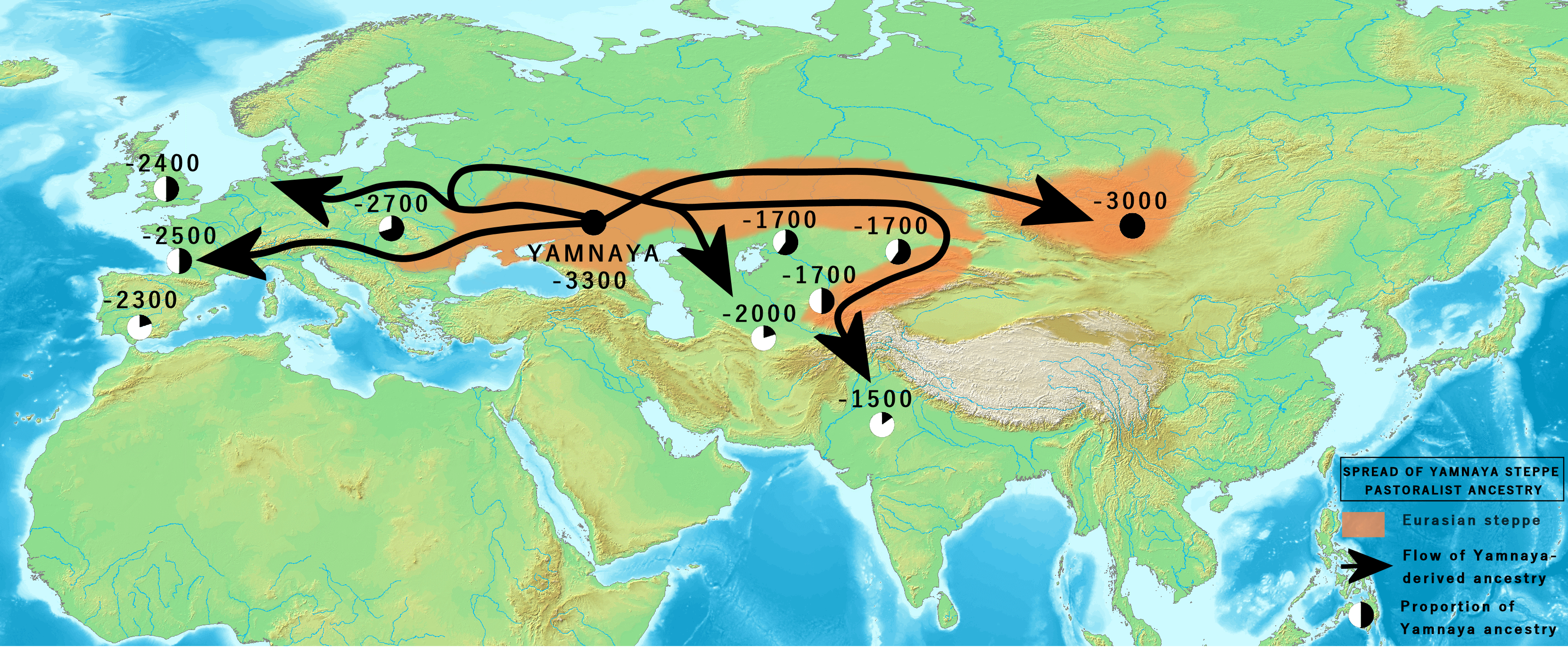
Bronze Age spread of Yamnaya Steppe pastoralist ancestry into two subcontinents—Europe and South Asia, and arrival in the subcontinent as Indo-Aryans

The early Vedic age is historically dated to the second half of the second millennium BCE. Historically, after the collapse of the Indus Valley Civilisation, which occurred around 1900 BCE, groups of Indo-Aryan peoples migrated into north-western India and started to inhabit the northern Indus Valley. The Indo-Aryans represented a sub-group that diverged from other Indo-Iranian tribes at the Andronovo horizon before the middle of the 2nd millennium BCE. (Note: See: Anthony 2007, p. 408 states that around 1800–1600 BCE, the Indo-Aryans are believed to have split off from the Iranians.; Anthony 2007, p. 454 states that one of these Indo-Aryan groups would found the Mitanni kingdom in northern Syria (c. 1500–1300 BCE).; Beckwith 2009, pp. 33, 35 states that they were defeated and split into two groups by the Iranians, who dominated the Central Eurasian steppe zone and "chased them to the extremities of Central Eurasia."; Beckwith 2009, p. 34 states that the other group were the Vedic people, who were pursued by the Iranians "across Iran into India."; For an overview of the current relevant research, see: Witzel 2001; Bhan 2002; Anthony 2007; Ratnagar 2008; Parpola 2015; Joseph 2018; Joseph 2019) The Indo-Iranians originated in the Sintashta culture, from which arose the subsequent Andronovo horizon. The Indo-Aryans migrated through the adjacent Bactria–Margiana area (present-day northern Afghanistan) to northwest India, (Note: According to Anthony 2007, pp. 454–455, at least 383 non-Indo-European words were borrowed from this culture, including the god Indra and the ritual drink Soma, which according to Anthony was "probably borrowed from the BMAC religion." Anthony 2007, p. 454: "Many of the qualities of Indo-Iranian god of might/victory, Verethraghna, were transferred to the adopted god Indra, who became the central deity of the developing Old Indic culture. Indra was the subject of 250 hymns, a quarter of the Rigveda. He was associated more than any other deity with Soma, a stimulant drug (perhaps derived from Ephedra) probably borrowed from the BMAC religion. His rise to prominence was a peculiar trait of the Old Indic speakers." Narasimhan et al. state that there was no genetic impact from Bactria-Margiana populations on the ancestry of South Asians.) followed by the rise of the Iranian Yaz culture at c. 1500 BCE, and the Iranian migrations into Iran at c. 800 BCE.

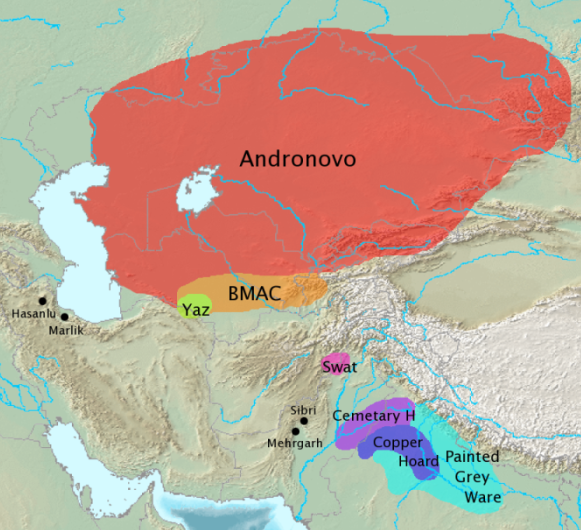
Archaeological cultures associated with Indo-Iranian migrations (after EIEC). The Andronovo, BMAC and Yaz cultures have often been associated with Indo-Iranian migrations. The GGC, Cemetery H, Copper Hoard and PGW cultures are candidates for cultures associated with Indo-Aryan movements.

Some Indian writers and archaeologists have opposed the notion of a migration of Indo-Aryans into India, and argued for an indigenous origin of the Indo-Aryans. In this view, "the Indian civilization must be viewed as an unbroken tradition that goes back to the earliest period of the Sindhu-Sarasvati (or Indus) tradition (7000 or 8000 BCE)." Though popular in India, and reflecting Indian views on Indian history and religion, the idea of a purely indigenous origin of the Indo-Aryans is outside the academic mainstream.

The knowledge about the Aryans comes mostly from the Rigveda-samhita, i.e. the oldest layer of the Vedas, which was composed c. 1400–1000 BCE. (Note: Witzel 2019, p. 11: "Incidentally, the Indo-Aryan loanwords in Mitanni confirm the date of the Rig Veda for ca. 1200–1000 BCE. The Rig Veda is a late Bronze age text, thus from before 1000 BCE. However, the Mitanni words have a form of Indo-Aryan that is slightly older than that ... Clearly the Rig Veda cannot be older than ca. 1400, and taking into account a period needed for linguistic change, it may not be much older than ca. 1200 BCE.") They brought with them their distinctive religious traditions and practices. The Vedic beliefs and practices of the pre-classical era were closely related to the hypothesised Proto-Indo-European religion and the Indo-Iranian religion. Funeral sacrifices from the Sintashta culture show close parallels to the sacrificial funeral rites of the Rigveda, while, according to Anthony, the Old Indic religion probably emerged among Indo-European immigrants in the contact zone between the Zeravshan River (present-day Uzbekistan) and (present-day) Tajikistan. It was "a syncretic mixture of old Central Asian and new Indo-European elements", which borrowed "distinctive religious beliefs and practices" from the Bactria–Margiana culture, including the god Indra and the ritual drink Soma.

=== Early Vedic period (c. 1500 BCE – c. 1000 BCE) ===
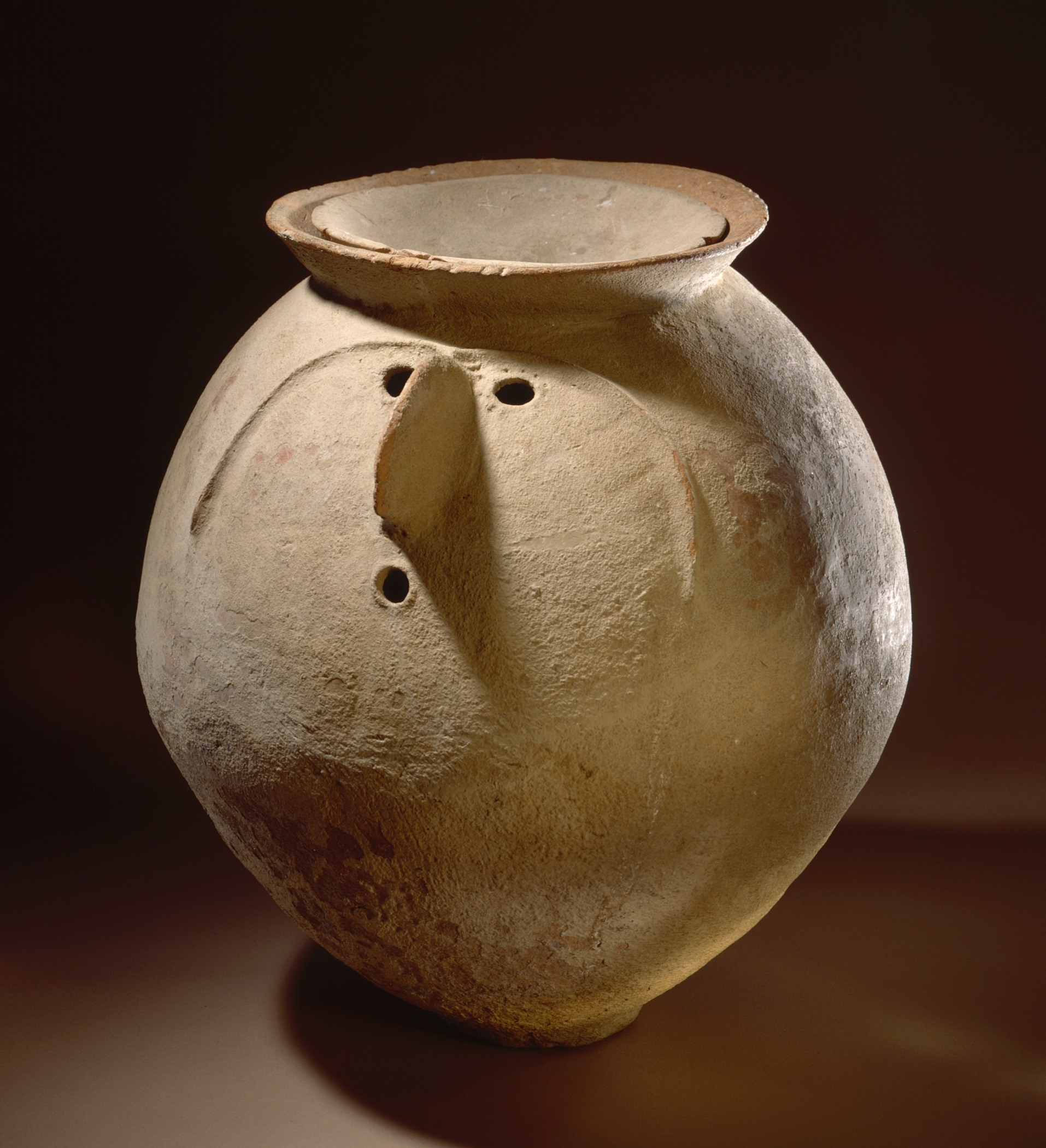
Cremation urn of the Gandhara grave culture (c. 1200 BCE), associated with Vedic material culture

The Rigveda contains accounts of conflicts between the Aryas and the Dasas and Dasyus. It describes Dasas and Dasyus as people who do not perform sacrifices (akratu) or obey the commandments of gods (avrata). Their speech is described as mridhra which could variously mean soft, uncouth, hostile, scornful or abusive. Other adjectives which describe their physical appearance are subject to many interpretations. However, some modern scholars such as Asko Parpola connect the Dasas and Dasyus to Iranian tribes Dahae and Dahyu and believe that Dasas and Dasyus were early Indo-Aryan immigrants who arrived into the subcontinent before the Vedic Aryans. Likewise, Bronkhorst has argued that the central Ganges Plain was dominated by a related but non-Vedic Indo-Aryan culture, a difference also noted by Samuel.

Accounts of military conflicts in between the various tribes of Vedic Aryans are also described in the Rigveda. Most notable of such conflicts was the Battle of the Ten Kings, which took place on the banks of the river Parushni (modern day Ravi). (Note: According to Erdosy, this battle provided a prototype for the epic Mahabharata, Hiltebeitel calls this idea a "particularly baffling fancy.") The battle was fought between the tribe Bharatas, led by their chief Sudas, against a confederation of ten tribes. The Bharatas lived around the upper regions of the river Saraswati, while the Purus, their western neighbours, lived along the lower regions of Saraswati. The other tribes dwelt north-west of the Bharatas in the region of Punjab. Division of the waters of Ravi could have been a reason for the war. The confederation of tribes tried to inundate the Bharatas by opening the embankments of Ravi, yet Sudas emerged victorious in the Battle of Ten Kings. The Bharatas and the Purus merged into a new tribe, the Kuru, after the war.

=== Later Vedic period (c. 1000 – c. 600 BCE) ===
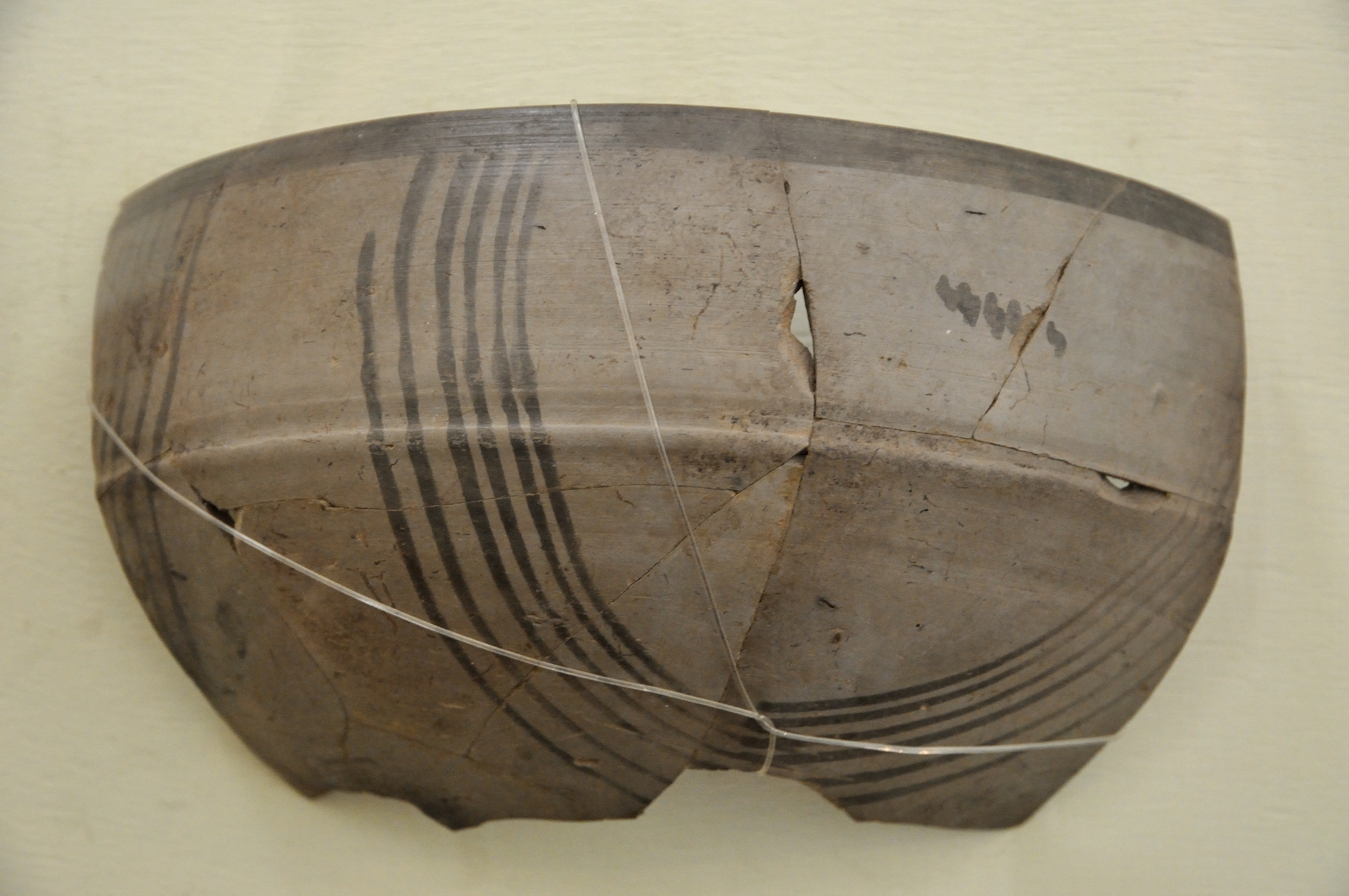
Pottery of the Painted Grey Ware culture (c. 1000–600 BCE), associated with Vedic material culture

After the 12th century BCE, as the Rigveda had taken its final form, the Vedic society, which is associated with the Kuru-Panchala region but were not the only Indo-Aryan people in northern India, transitioned from semi-nomadic life to settled agriculture in north-western India. Possession of horses remained an important priority of Vedic leaders and a remnant of the nomadic lifestyle, resulting in trade routes beyond the Hindu Kush to maintain this supply as horses needed for cavalry and sacrifice could not be bred in India. The Gangetic plains had remained out of bounds to the Vedic tribes because of thick forest cover. After 1000 BCE, the use of iron axes and ploughs became widespread and the jungles could be cleared with ease. This enabled the Vedic Aryans to extend their settlements into the western area of the Ganga-Yamuna Doab. Many of the old tribes coalesced to form larger political units.

The Vedic religion was further developed with the emergence of the Kuru kingdom, systematising its religious literature and developing the Śrauta ritual. It is associated with the Painted Grey Ware culture (c.1200–600 BCE), which did not expand east of the Ganga-Yamuna Doab. It differed from the related, yet markedly different, culture of the Central Ganges region, which was associated with the Northern Black Polished Ware culture and the Mahajanapadas (Republics/Kingdoms) of Kosala and Magadha.

In this period the varna system emerged, state Kulke and Rothermund, which in this stage of Indian history were a "hierarchical order of estates which reflected a division of labor among various social classes". The Vedic period estates were four: Brahmin priests and warrior nobility stood on top, free peasants and traders were the third, and slaves, labourers and artisans, many belonging to the pre-Aryan groups, were the fourth. This was a period where agriculture, metal, and commodity production, as well as trade, greatly expanded, and the Vedic era texts including the early Upanishads and many Sutras important to later Hindu culture were completed.

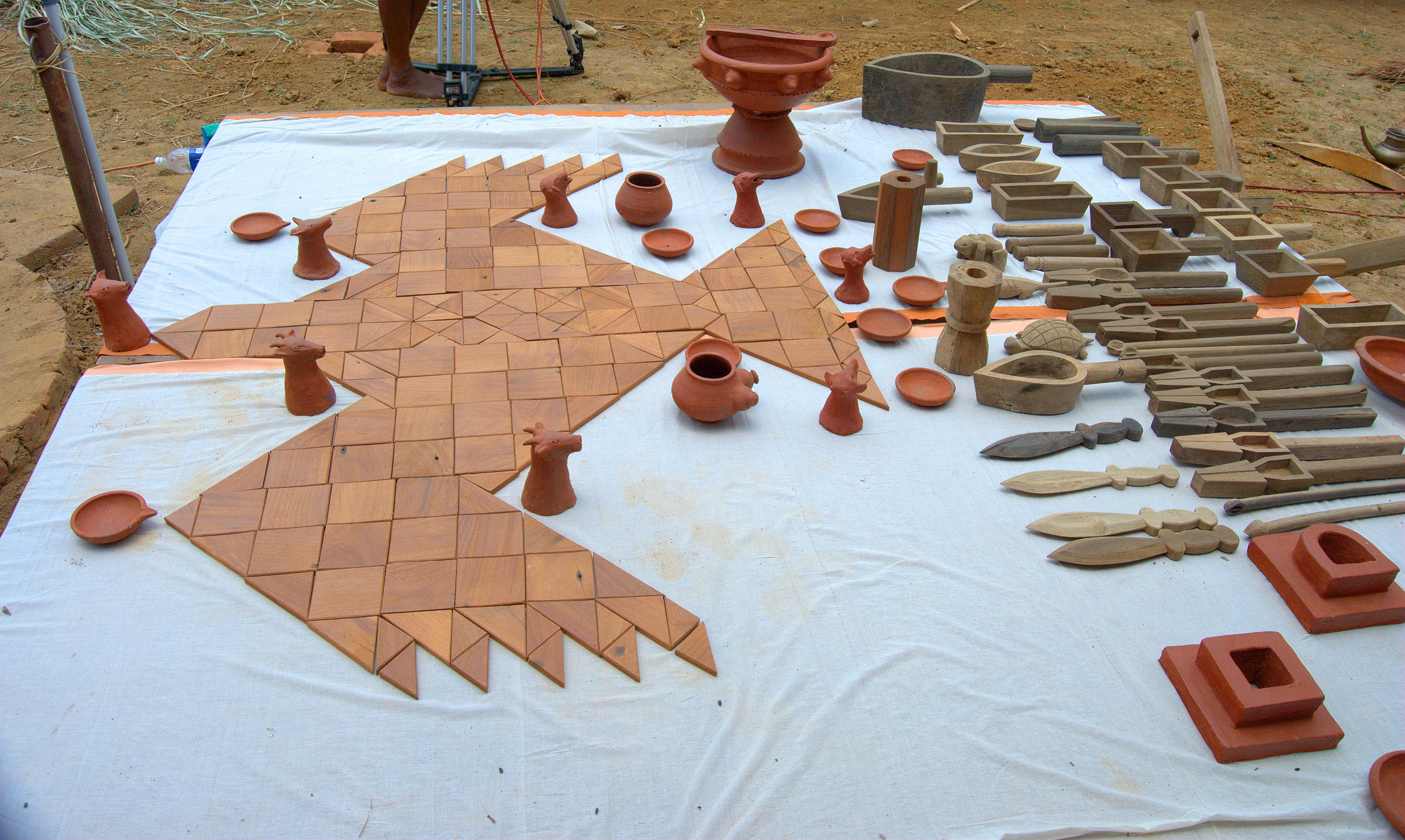
Modern replica of utensils and falcon shaped altar used for Agnicayana, an elaborate Śrauta ritual originating from the Kuru kingdom.

The Kuru kingdom, the earliest Vedic "state", was formed by a "super-tribe" which joined several tribes in a new unit. To govern this state, Vedic hymns were collected and transcribed, and new rituals were developed, which formed the now orthodox Śrauta rituals. Two key figures in this process of the development of the Kuru state were the king Parikshit and his successor Janamejaya, transforming this realm into the dominant political and cultural power of northern Iron Age India.

The most well-known of the new religious sacrifices that arose in this period were the Ashvamedha (horse sacrifice). This sacrifice involved setting a consecrated horse free to roam the kingdoms for a year. The horse was followed by a chosen band of warriors. The kingdoms and chiefdoms in which the horse wandered had to pay homage or prepare to battle the king to whom the horse belonged. This sacrifice put considerable pressure on inter-state relations in this era. This period saw also the beginning of the social stratification by the use of varna, the division of Vedic society into Brahmins, Kshatriya, Vaishya and Shudra.

The Kuru kingdom declined after its defeat by the non-Vedic Salva tribe, and the political center of Vedic culture shifted east, into the Panchala kingdom on the Ganges, under King Keśin Dālbhya (approximately between 900 and 750 BCE). Later, in the 8th or 7th century BCE, the kingdom of Videha emerged as a political center farther to the East, in what is today northern Bihar of India and southeastern Nepal, reaching its prominence under the king Janaka, whose court provided patronage for Brahmin sages and philosophers such as Yajnavalkya, Uddalaka Aruni, and Gargi Vachaknavi; Panchala also remained prominent during this period, under its king Pravahana Jaivali.

=== Towards urbanisation ===
By the 6th century BCE, the political units consolidated into large kingdoms called Mahajanapadas. The process of urbanisation had begun in these kingdoms, commerce and travel flourished, even regions separated by large distances became easy to access. Anga, a small kingdom to the east of Magadha (on the door step of modern-day West Bengal), formed the eastern boundary of the Vedic culture. Yadavas expanded towards the south and settled in Mathura. To the south of their kingdom was Vatsa which was governed from its capital Kausambi. The Narmada River and parts of North Western Deccan formed the southern limits. The newly formed states struggled for supremacy and started displaying imperial ambitions.

The end of the Vedic period is marked by linguistic, cultural and political changes. The grammar of Pāṇini marks a final apex in the codification of Sutra texts, and at the same time the beginning of Classical Sanskrit. Meanwhile, in the Kosala-Magadha region, the shramana movements (including Jainism and Buddhism) objected to the self-imposed authority and orthodoxy of the intruding Brahmins and their Vedic scriptures and ritual. According to Bronkhorst, the sramana culture arose in "Greater Magadha," which was Indo-European, but not Vedic. In this culture, kshatriyas were placed higher than Brahmins, and it rejected Vedic authority and rituals. Greater Magadha reached its zenith under the Maurya Empire. Meanwhile, the Achaemenid invasion of Cyrus and Darius I of the Indus valley in the early 6th century BCE marks the beginning of outside influence, which continued in the Kingdoms of the Indo-Greeks, Indo-Scythians, and Indo-Parthians. This period culminated with the Kushan and Gupta Empire, which resulted in the "Hindu Synthesis".

== Culture ==
=== Society ===
While Vedic society was relatively egalitarian in the sense that a distinct hierarchy of socio-economic classes or castes was absent, the Vedic period saw the emergence of a hierarchy of social classes. Political hierarchy was determined by rank, where rājan (tribal king or chieftain) and rājanya (tribal nobility) stood at the top, the viś (the common people) in the middle, and the dāsa and dasyu (non-Indo-Aryan servants) at the bottom. The words Brahamana and Kshatriya occur in various family books of the Rigveda, but they are not associated with the term varna. The words Vaishya and Shudra are absent. Verses of the Rigveda, such as 3.44–45, indicate the absence of strict social hierarchy and the existence of social mobility:

O, Indra, fond of soma, would you make me the protector of people, or would you make me a king, would you make me a sage who has drunk soma, would you impart to me endless wealth.

The Vedic society was patriarchal and patrilineal. The institution of marriage was important and different types of marriages— monogamy, polygyny and polyandry are mentioned in the Rigveda. Both women sages and female gods were known to Vedic Aryans. Women could choose their husbands and could remarry if their husbands died or disappeared. While the wife enjoyed a respectable position, she was subordinate to her husband. People consumed milk, milk products, grains, fruits and vegetables. Meat eating is mentioned; however, cows are labelled aghnya (not to be killed). Clothes of cotton, wool and animal skin were worn. Soma and sura were popular drinks in the Vedic society, of which soma was sanctified by religion. Flute (vana), lute (vina), harp, cymbals and drums were the musical instruments played and a heptatonic scale was used. Dancing, dramas, chariot racing and gambling were other popular pastimes.

The emergence of monarchical states in the later Vedic age led to a distancing of the rajan from the people and the emergence of a varna hierarchy. The society was divided into four social groups—Brahmanas, Kshatriyas, Vaishyas and Shudras. The later Vedic texts fixed social boundaries, roles, status and ritual purity for each of the groups. The Shatapatha Brahmana associates the Brahmana with purity of parentage, good conduct, glory, teaching or protecting people; Kshatriya with strength, fame, ruling, and warfare; Vaishya with material prosperity and production-related activities such as cattle rearing and agriculture; Shudras with the service of the higher varnas. The effects of Rajasuya sacrifice depended on the varna of the sacrificer. Rajasuya endowed Brahmana with lustre, Kshatriya with valour, Vaishya with procreative power and Shudra with stability. The hierarchy of the top three varnas is ambiguous in the later Vedic texts. Panchavamsha Brahmana and verse 13.8.3.11 of the Shatapatha Brahmana place Kshatriya over Brahmana and Vaishya, whereas, verse 1.1.4.12 places Brahmana and Vaishya over the Kshatriya and Shudra. The Purusha Sukta visualised the four varnas as hierarchical, but inter-related parts of an organic whole. Despite the increasing social stratification in the later Vedic times, hymns like Rigveda IX.112 suggest some amount of social mobility: "I am a reciter of hymns, my father a physician, and my mother grinds (corn) with stones. We desire to obtain wealth in various actions."

Household became an important unit in the later Vedic age. The variety of households of the Vedic era gave way to an idealised household which was headed by a grihapati. The relations between husband and wife, father and son were hierarchically organised and the women were relegated to subordinate and docile roles. Polygyny was more common than polyandry and texts like Tattiriya Samhita indicate taboos around menstruating women. Various professions women took to are mentioned in the later Vedic texts. Women tended to cattle, milked cows, carded wool; were weavers, dyers, and corn grinders. Women warriors such as Vishpala, who lost a leg in battle, are mentioned. Two female philosophers are mentioned in the Upanishads. Patrick Olivelle, in his translation of the Upanishads, writes that "the fact that these women are introduced without any attempt to justify or to explain how women could be engaged in theological matters suggests the relatively high social and religious position of at least women of some social strata during this period."

=== Political organization ===
Vedic weaponry
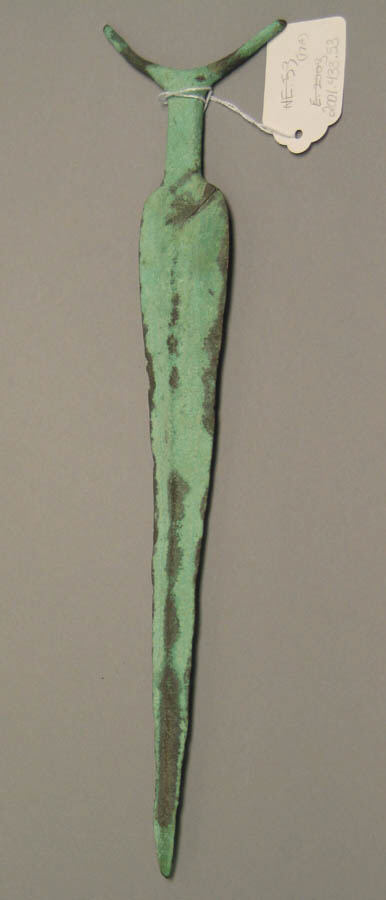
Ancient Indian antennae sword; metalwork, 1500–500 BCE

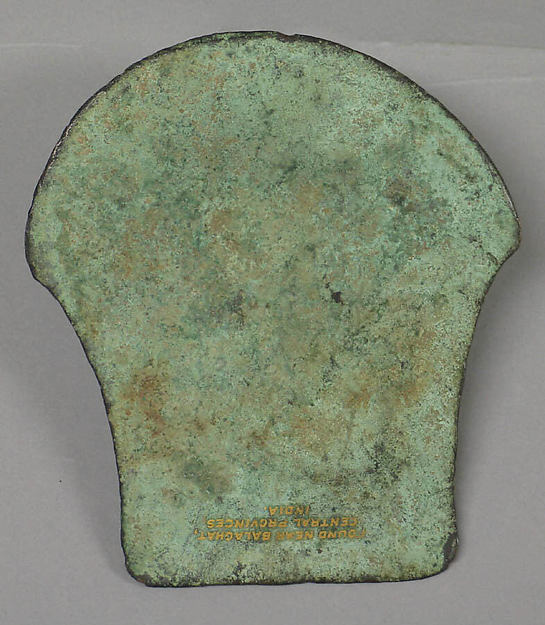
Ancient Indian axe blade, 1500–1000 BCE

Early Vedic Aryans were organised into tribes rather than kingdoms. The chief of a tribe was called a rajan. The autonomy of the rajan was restricted by the tribal councils called sabha and samiti. The two bodies were, in part, responsible for the governance of the tribe. The rajan could not accede to the throne without their approval. The distinction between the two bodies is not clear. Arthur Llewellyn Basham, a noted historian and indologist, theorises that sabha was a meeting of great men in the tribe, whereas, samiti was a meeting of all free tribesmen. Some tribes had no hereditary chiefs and were directly governed by the tribal councils. Rajan had a rudimentary court which was attended by courtiers (sabhasad) and chiefs of sects (gramani). The main responsibility of the rajan was to protect the tribe. He was aided by several functionaries, including the purohita (chaplain), the senani (army chief), dutas (envoys) and spash (spies). Purohita performed ceremonies and spells for success in war and prosperity in peace.

In the later Vedic period, the tribes had consolidated into small kingdoms, which had a capital and a rudimentary administrative system. To aid in governing these new states, the kings and their Brahmin priests arranged Vedic hymns into collections and developed a new set of rituals (the now orthodox Śrauta rituals) to strengthen the emerging social hierarchy. The rajan was seen as the custodian of social order and the protector of rashtra (polity). Hereditary kingship started emerging and competitions like chariot races, cattle raids, and games of dice, which previously decided who was worthy of becoming a king, became nominal. Rituals in this era exalted the status of the king over his people. He was occasionally referred to as samrat (supreme ruler). The rajan's increasing political power enabled him to gain greater control over the productive resources. The voluntary gift offering (bali) became compulsory tribute; however, there was no organised system of taxation. Sabha and samiti are still mentioned in later Vedic texts, though, with the increasing power of the king, their influence declined. By the end of the later Vedic age, different kinds of political systems such as monarchical states (rajya), oligarchical states (gana or sangha), and tribal principalities had emerged in India.

According to Michael Witzel's analysis of the Kuru kingdom, it can be characterised as the earliest Vedic "state", during the Middle Vedic Period. (Note: Witzel's study is furthermore cited by: Hiltebeitel 2011, p. 57; Proferes 2003) However, Robert Bellah observes that it is difficult to "pin down" whether the Kurus were a true "state" or a complex chiefdom, as the Kuru kings notably never adopted royal titles higher than "rājan," which means "chief" rather than "king" in the Vedic context. The Middle Vedic Period is also characterised by a lack of cities; Bellah compares this to early state formation in ancient Hawaii and "very early Egypt," which were "territorial states" rather than "city-states," and thus "it was the court, not the city, that provided the center, and the court was often peripatetic." Romila Thapar characterises Vedic-era state formation as being in a condition of "arrested development," because local chiefs were relatively autonomous, and because surplus wealth that could have been directed towards state-building was instead used for the increasingly grandiose rituals that also served to structure social relations. The period of the Upanishads, the final phase of the Vedic era, was approximately contemporaneous with a new wave of state formations, linked to the beginning of urbanisation in the Ganges Valley: along with the growth of population and trade networks, these social and economic changes put pressure on older ways of life, setting the stage for the Upanishads and the subsequent śramaṇa movements, and the end of the Vedic Period, which was followed by the Mahajanapada period.

According to George Erdosy, archaeological data for the period from 1000 to 600 BCE shows a two-tiered settlement pattern in the Ganges Valley, with some "modest central places," suggestive of the existence of simple chiefdoms, with the Kurukshetra district itself displaying a more complex (albeit not yet urbanised) three-tiered hierarchy. Subsequently, (after 600 BCE) there are four tiers of site sizes, including large towns and fortified cities, consistent with an urbanised state-level society.

=== Economy ===
Economy in the Vedic period was sustained by a combination of pastoralism and agriculture. There are references, in the Rigveda, to the levelling of fields, seed processing, and storage of grains in large jars. War bounty was also a major source of wealth. Economic exchanges were conducted by gift giving, particularly to kings (bali) and priests (dana), and barter using cattle as a unit of currency. While gold is mentioned in some hymns, there is no indication of the use of coins. Metallurgy is not mentioned in the Rigveda, but the word ayas and instruments made from it such as razors, bangles, axes are mentioned. One verse mentions purification of ayas. Some scholars believe that ayas refers to iron and the words dham and karmara refer to iron-welders. However, philological evidence indicates that ayas in the Rigveda refers only to copper and bronze, while iron or śyāma ayas, literally "black metal", first is mentioned in the post-Rigvedic Atharvaveda, and therefore the Early Vedic Period was a Bronze Age culture whereas the Late Vedic Period was an Iron Age culture.

The transition of Vedic society from semi-nomadic life to settled agriculture in the later Vedic age led to an increase in trade and competition for resources. Agriculture dominated the economic activity along the Ganges valley during this period. Agricultural operations grew in complexity and usage of iron implements (krishna–ayas or shyama–ayas, literally black metal or dark metal) increased. Crops of wheat, rice, and barley were cultivated. Surplus production helped to support the centralised kingdoms that were emerging at this time. New crafts and occupations such as carpentry, leather work, tanning, pottery, astrology, jewellery, dyeing, and winemaking arose. Apart from copper, bronze, and gold, later Vedic texts also mention tin, lead, and silver.

Panis in some hymns refers to merchants, in others to stingy people who hid their wealth and did not perform Vedic sacrifices. Some scholars suggest that Panis were semitic traders, but the evidence for this is slim. Professions of warriors, priests, cattle-rearers, farmers, hunters, barbers, vintners and crafts of chariot-making, cart-making, carpentry, metal working, tanning, making of bows, sewing, weaving, making mats of grass and reed are mentioned in the hymns of the Rigveda. Some of these might have needed full-time specialists. There are references to boats and oceans. Book X of the Rigveda refers to both eastern and western oceans. Individual property ownership did not exist and clans as a whole enjoyed rights over lands and herds. Enslavement (dasa, dasi) in the course of war or as a result of non-payment of debt is mentioned. However, slaves worked in households rather than production-related activities.

=== Religion ===
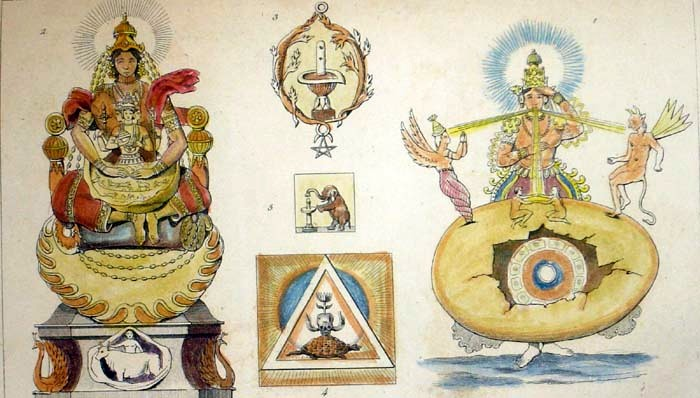
A steel engraving from the 1850s, which depicts the creative activities of Prajapati, a Vedic deity who presides over procreation and protection of life

==== Vedic religion ====
Texts considered to date to the Vedic period are mainly the four Vedas, but the Brahmanas, Aranyakas and the older Upanishads as well as the oldest Śrautasutras are also considered to be Vedic. The Vedas record the liturgy connected with the rituals and sacrifices performed by the 16 or 17 Śrauta priests and the purohitas.

The rishis, the composers of the hymns of the Rigveda, were considered inspired poets and seers (in post-Vedic times understood as "hearers" of an eternally existing Veda, Śruti means "what is heard").

The mode of worship was the performance of sacrifices (Yajna) which included the chanting of Rigvedic verses (see Vedic chant), singing of Samans and 'mumbling' of sacrificial mantras (Yajus). Yajna involved sacrifice and sublimation of the havana sámagri (herbal preparations) in the fire accompanied by the chanting of the Vedic mantras. The sublime meaning of the word yajna is derived from the Sanskrit verb yaj, which has a three-fold meaning of worship of deities (devapujana), unity (saògatikaraña) and charity (dána). An essential element was the sacrificial fire—the divine Agni—into which oblations were poured, as everything offered into the fire was believed to reach God. People prayed for abundance of rain, cattle, sons, long life and gaining 'heaven'.

Vedic people believed in the transmigration of the soul, and the peepul tree and cow were sanctified by the time of the Atharvaveda. Many of the concepts of Indian philosophy espoused later like Dharma, Karma etc. trace their root to the Vedas.

The main deities of the Vedic pantheon were Indra, Agni (the sacrificial fire), and Soma and some deities of social order such as Mitra–Varuna, Aryaman, Bhaga and Amsa, further nature deities such as Surya (the Sun), Vayu (the wind) and Prithivi (the earth). Goddesses included Ushas (the dawn), Prithvi and Aditi (the mother of the Aditya gods or sometimes the cow). Rivers, especially Saraswati, were also considered goddesses. Deities were not viewed as all-powerful. The relationship between humans and the deity was one of transaction, with Agni (the sacrificial fire) taking the role of messenger between the two. Strong traces of a common Indo-Iranian religion remain visible, especially in the Soma cult and the fire worship, both of which are preserved in Zoroastrianism.

Ethics in the Vedas are based on the concepts of Satya and Rta. Satya is the principle of integration rooted in the Absolute. Whereas, Ṛta is the expression of Satya, which regulates and coordinates the operation of the universe and everything within it. (Note: Panikkar 2001, pp. 350–351 remarks: "Ṛta is the ultimate foundation of everything; it is "the supreme", although this is not to be understood in a static sense. [...] It is the expression of the primordial dynamism that is inherent in everything....") Conformity with Ṛta would enable progress whereas its violation would lead to punishment.

==== Influence on Hinduism ====
Around the beginning of the Common Era, the Vedic tradition formed one of the main constituents of the "Hindu synthesis". (Note: Jamison & Witzel 2003, p. 65: "... to call this period Vedic Hinduism is a contradiction in terms since Vedic religion is very different from what we generally call Hindu religion – at least as much as Old Hebrew religion is from mediaeval and modern Christian religion. However, Vedic religion is treatable as a predecessor of Hinduism.") Vedic religion survived in the srayta ritual, whereas ascetic and devotional traditions like Yoga and Vedanta acknowledge the authority of the Vedas, but interpret the Vedic pantheon as a unitary view of the universe with 'God' (Brahman) seen as immanent and transcendent in the forms of Ishvara and Brahman. Later texts such as the Upanishads and epics, namely the Gita of Mahabharata, are essential parts of these later developments.

=== Literature ===
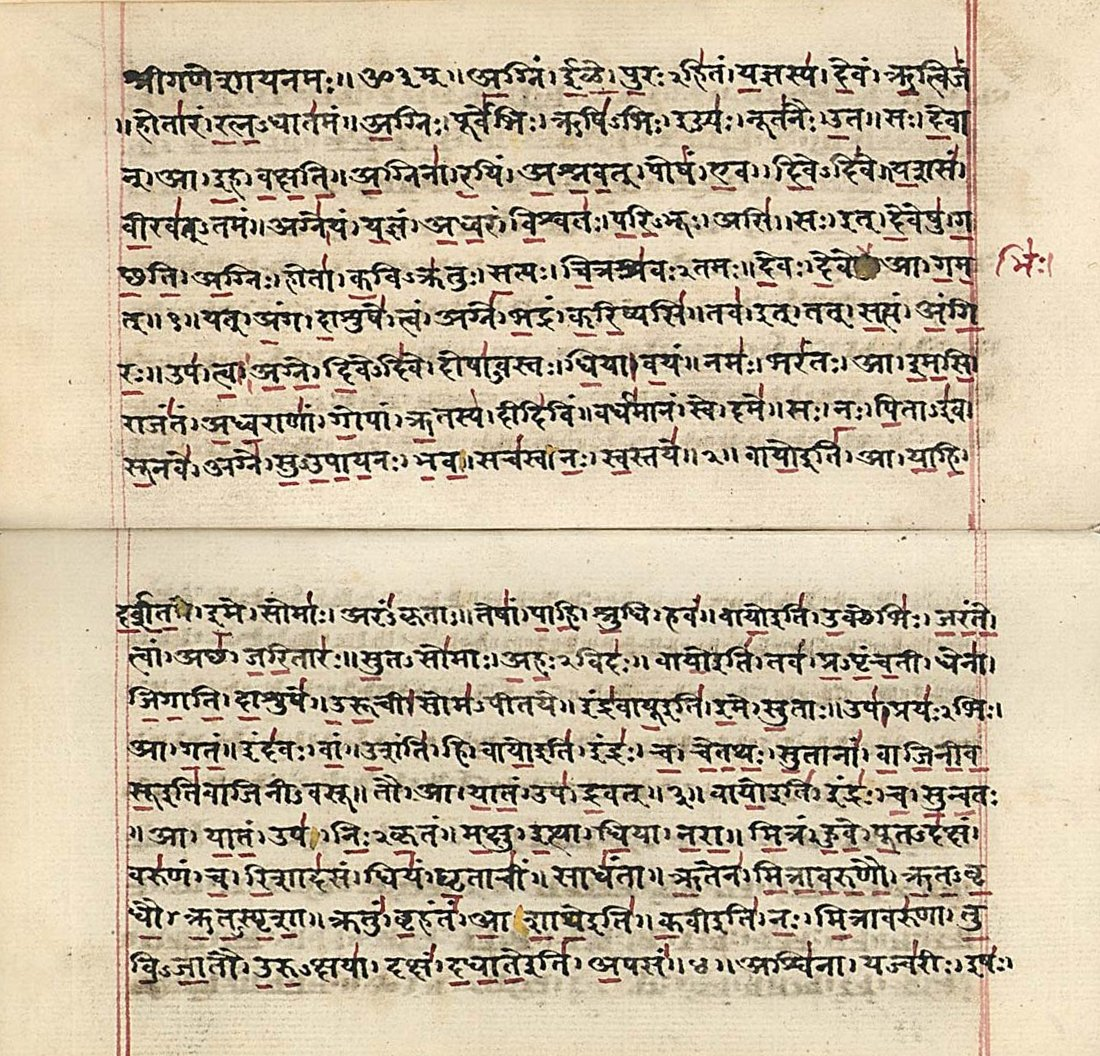
An early-19th-century manuscript of Rigveda (padapatha) in Devanagari. The Vedic accent is marked by underscores and vertical overscores in red.

The reconstruction of the history of Vedic India is based on text-internal details, but can be correlated to relevant archaeological details. Linguistically, the Vedic texts could be classified in five chronological strata:

1. Rigvedic text: The Rigveda is by far the most archaic of the Vedic texts preserved, and it retains many common Indo-Iranian elements, both in language and in content, that are not present in any other Vedic text. Its time span likely corresponds to the Late Harappan culture, Gandhara grave culture and Ochre Coloured Pottery culture.
2. Mantra language texts: This period includes both the mantra and prose language of the Atharvaveda (Paippalada and Shaunmkiya), the Rigveda Khilani, the Samaveda Samhita (containing some 75 mantras not in the Rigveda), and the mantras of the Yajurveda. Many of these texts are largely derived from the Rigveda, but have undergone certain changes, both by linguistic change and by reinterpretation. Conspicuous changes include change of vishva "all" by sarva, and the spread of the kuru- verbal stem (for Rigvedic krno-). This is the time of the early Iron Age in north-western India, corresponding to the Black and Red Ware (BRW) and Painted Grey Ware (PGW) cultures, and the early Kuru kingdom, dating from c. the 12th to 11th centuries BCE.
3. Samhita prose texts: This period marks the beginning of the collection and codification of a Vedic canon. An important linguistic change is the complete loss of the injunctive. The Brahmana part ('commentary' on mantras and ritual) of the Black Yajurveda (MS, KS, TS) belongs to this period. Archaeologically, the Painted Grey Ware culture from c. 1000 or 900 BCE corresponds to the Kuru kingdom and the subsequent eastward shift of the political centre from the Kurus to the Panchalas on the Ganges.
4. Brahmana prose texts: The Brahmanas proper of the four Vedas belong to this period, as well as the Aranyakas, the oldest of the Upanishads (BAU, ChU, JUB) and the oldest Śrautasutras (BSS, VadhSS). In the east, Videha (N. Bihar and Nepal) is established as the third main political centre of the Vedic period.
5. Sutra language texts: This is the last stratum of Vedic Sanskrit leading up to c. 500 BCE, comprising the bulk of the Śrauta and Grhya Sutras, and some Upanishads (e.g. KathU, MaitrU).

=== Visual arts ===
In northern India, some very early depictions of deities appear in the art of the Indus Valley Civilisation, but the following millennium, coinciding with the Indo–Aryan migration during the Vedic period, is devoid of such remains. It has been suggested that the early Vedic religion focused exclusively on the worship of purely "elementary forces of nature by means of elaborate sacrifices", which did not lend themselves easily to anthropomorphological representations. Various artefacts may belong to the Copper Hoard culture (2nd millennium CE), some of them suggesting anthropomorphological characteristics. Interpretations vary as to the exact signification of these artefacts, or even the culture and the periodisation to which they belonged. Some examples of artistic expression also appear in abstract pottery designs during the Black and red ware culture (1450–1200 BCE) or the Painted Grey Ware culture (1200–600 BCE), with finds in a wide area, including the area of Mathura.

== Archæology ==
Archaeological cultures identified with phases of Vedic material culture include the Ochre Coloured Pottery culture, the Gandhara grave culture, the Black and red ware culture and the Painted Grey Ware culture.

Ochre coloured pottery culture was first found approximately between 1950 and 1951, in western Uttar Pradesh, in the Badaun and Bisjuar district. It is thought that this culture was prominent during the latter half of the 2nd millennium, within the transition between the Indus Valley civilisation and the end of Harappan culture. This pottery is typically created with wheel ware, and is ill-fired, to a fine to medium fabric, decorated with a red slip, and occasional black bands1. When this pottery was worked with, it often left an ochre color on the hands, most likely because of water-logging, bad firing, wind action, or a mixture of these factors. This pottery was found all throughout the doab, most of it found in the Muzaffarnagar, Meerut, and Bulandshahr districts, but also existing outside these districts, extending north and south of Bahadrabad. This pottery does, however, seem to exist within different time frames of popularity, ochre coloured pottery seeming to occur in areas such as Rajasthan earlier than we see it in the doab, despite the doab being heavily associated with the culture.

Gandhara grave culture refers to the protohistoric cemeteries found in the Gandhara region, stretching all the way from Bajuar to the Indus. These cemeteries seem to follow a set grave structure and "mortuary practice", such as inflexed inhumation and cremation. This culture is thought to occur in 3 stages: the lower, in which burials take place in masonry lined pits, the upper, in which urn burials and cremations are added, and the "surface" level, in which graves are covered with huge stone slabs. In the lower stage, excavators found that these graves are typically 2–3 feet deep, and covered with stones on top. After digging out the stones, skeletons were found facing southwest to northeast, with the head facing one direction, and the hands laying on top of one another. Female skeletons were often found wearing hair pins and jewellery. Pottery is greatly important to this culture, as pottery was often used as a "grave good", being buried with the bodies of the dead. Buried alongside the skeletons, we typically see various pots on top of the body, averaging at about 5 or less pieces of pottery per grave. Within this culture we typically see two kinds of pottery: grey ware, or red ware.

Black and red ware culture was coined as a term in 1946 by Sir Mortimer Wheeler. The pottery, as the name suggests, typically has a black rim/inside surface, and a red lower half on the outside of the piece. Red-ware pottery tends to fall into two categories: offering stands, or cooking vessels. Most of these pieces of pottery were open-mouthed bowls that were burnished, painted, or slipped on one side; however, jars, pots and dishes-on-stands have also been found in small quantities. Black and red ware, and the surrounding culture, began its spread during the Neolithic period and continues until the early medieval period in India, as well as being found in parts of West Asia and Egypt. There are many theories about the process of its creation, the most popular being the use of an inverted firing technique, or a simultaneous oxidation and reduction firing.

Painted grey ware culture is a significant pottery style that has been linked to a group of people who settled in Sutlej, Ghagger, and the Upper Ganga/Yamuna Valleys, loosely classified with the early Aryans who migrated to India in the beginning of the Vedic period. It's also thought that the groups that introduced the painted grey ware culture also brought iron technology to the Indo-gangetic plains, making this pottery a momentous mark of the Northern Indian Iron Age. The style of grey-ware often includes clay wheel-thrown into a smooth texture, ash-grey in colour, and often decorated with black ink, creating small circular patterns, sometimes spirals, swastikas, or sigmas. Grey-ware pottery is almost exclusively drinking ware, and tends to have three different forms: narrow-waisted, tall drinking glasses, middle-sized drinking goblets, and drinking vases with outturned lips. There was a distinct grey ware culture surrounding the establishment of the pottery, but while the culture is significant, grey ware has only made up 10–15% of found Vedic pottery, a majority of the pottery red ware, as grey ware pottery was seen as a "highly valued luxury".

== Puranic chronology of the Vedic period ==
The Puranic chronology, the timeline of events in ancient Indian history and mythology as narrated in post-Vedic Hindu texts such as the Mahabharata, the Ramayana and the Puranas, envisions a much older chronology for the Vedic culture. In this view, the Vedas were received by the seven rishis thousands of years ago. The start of the reign of Vaivasvata Manu, the Manu of the current kalpa (aeon) and the progenitor of humanity, is dated by some as far back 7350 BCE. The Kurukshetra War, the background-scene of the Bhagavad Gita, which may relate historical events taking place ca. 1000 BCE at the heartland of Āryāvarta, is dated in this chronology at c. 3100 BCE.

== See also ==
- History of India
- Historical Vedic religion
- Indus Valley Civilisation
- Vedanga
- Indigenous Aryanism
- Avestan period (Contemporaneous period in Iranian history)

== Sources ==
- Anthony, David W. (2007). The Horse, the Wheel, and Language: How Bronze-Age Riders from the Eurasian Steppes Shaped the Modern World. Princeton University Press. ISBN 978-0-691-05887-0.
- Anthony, David; Ringe, Don (2015), "The Indo-European Homeland from Linguistic and Perspectives", Annual Review of Linguistics, 1: 199–219, doi:10.1146/annurev-linguist-030514-124812
- Avari, Burjor (2016). India: The Ancient Past: A History of the Indian Subcontinent from C. 7000 BCE to CE 1200. Routledge. ISBN 978-1-317-23673-3.
- Basham, A. L. (2008) [first published 1954 by Sidgwick and Jackson], The Wonder that was India: A survey of the history and culture of the Indian sub-continent before the coming of the Muslims, Scholarly Publishing Office, University of Michigan, ISBN 978-1-59740-599-7
- Beckwith, Christopher I. (16 March 2009). Empires of the Silk Road: A History of Central Eurasia from the Bronze Age to the Present. Princeton University Press. ISBN 978-1-4008-2994-1.
- Bellah, Robert N. (2011). Religion in Human Evolution: From the Paleolithic to the Axial Age (1st ed.). Belknap Press of Harvard University Press. ISBN 978-0-674-06143-9.
- Bhan, Suraj (2002). "Aryanization of the Indus Civilization". In K. N. Panikkar; T. J. Byres; U. Patnaik (eds.). The Making of History. pp. 41–55.
- Bronkhorst, Johannes (2007), Greater Magadha: Studies in the Culture of Early India, BRILL
- Bryant, Edwin (2001), The Quest for the Origins of Vedic Culture: The Indo-Aryan Migration Debate, New York: Oxford University Press
- Bryant, Edwin; Patton, Laurie, eds. (2005), Indo-Aryan Controversy: Evidence and Inference in Indian History, Routledge
- Dani, Ahmad Hasan (15 August 1966), Gandhara Grave Complex in West Pakistan, Pakistan: University of Peshawar
- Darvill, Timothy, ed. (2009), The Concise Oxford Dictionary of Archeology (2nd ed.), Oxford University Press
- Day, Terence P. (1982). The Conception of Punishment in Early Indian Literature. Waterloo, Ontario (Canada); Atlantic Highlands, New Jersey (US): Wilfrid Laurier University Press; Humanities Press. ISBN 0-919812-15-5.
- Erdosy, George (1995), The Indo-Aryans of Ancient South Asia: Language, Material Culture and Ethnicity, Walter de Gruyter
- Erdosy, George (1995a). "The prelude to urbanisation: ethnicity and the rise of Late Vedic chiefdoms". In F. R. Allchin (ed.). The Archaeology of Early Historic South Asia: The Emergence of Cities and States. Cambridge University Press. pp. 75–98. ISBN 978-0-521-37695-2.
- Erdosy, George (1995b). "City states of North India and Pakistan at the time of the Buddha". In F. R. Allchin (ed.). The Archaeology of Early Historic South Asia: The Emergence of Cities and States. Cambridge University Press. pp. 99–122. ISBN 978-0-521-37695-2.
- Flood, Gavin D. (1996), An Introduction to Hinduism, Cambridge University Press, ISBN 978-0-521-43878-0
- Fortson, Benjamin W. (2011), Indo-European Language and Culture: An Introduction, John Wiley & Sons, ISBN 978-1-4443-5968-8
- Griswold, Hervey De Witt (1971), The Religion of the Ṛigveda, Motilal Banarsidass, ISBN 978-81-208-0745-7
- Hedge, K.T.M. (2 January 2015), The Painted Grey Ware of India, vol. 49, Cambridge University Press, pp. 187–190
- Hiltebeitel, Alf (2001), Rethinking the Mahabharata: A Reader's Guide to the Education of the Dharma King, University of Chicago Press
  - Hiltebeitel, Alf (2002), "Hinduism", in Joseph Kitagawa (ed.), The Religious Traditions of Asia: Religion, History, and Culture, Routledge, ISBN 978-1-136-87597-7
  - Hiltebeitel, Alf (2007), "Hinduism", in Joseph Kitagawa (ed.), The Religious Traditions of Asia: Religion, History, and Culture (Digital printing), Routledge, ISBN 978-1-136-87590-8
- Hiltebeitel, Alf (2011). Dharma: Its Early History in Law, Religion, and Narrative. Oxford University Press.
- Holdrege, Barbara A. (2004), "Dharma", in Mittal, S.; Thursby, G. (eds.), The Hindu World, New York: Routledge, pp. 213–248, ISBN 0-415-21527-7
- Jamison, Stephanie W. (2006). "Edward F. Bryant and Laurie Patton, eds. Indo-Aryan Controversy: Evidence and Inference in Indian History. London and New York: Routledge (Book review)" (PDF). Journal of Indo-European Studies. 34: 255–261.
- Jamison, Stephanie W.; Witzel, Michael (2003). "Vedic Hinduism". In Arvind Sharma (ed.). The Study of Hinduism. University of South Carolina Press. pp. 65–113. ISBN 978-1570034497.
- Joseph, Tony (2018), Early Indians: The Story of Our Ancestors and Where We Came From, Juggernaut
- Joseph, Tony (13 September 2019), "New reports clearly confirm 'Arya' migration into India", The Hindu
- Kak, Subhash (2001b), "On the Chronological Framework for Indian Culture" (PDF), Journal of Indian Council of Philosophical Research
- Kak, Subhash (2005), "Vedic astronomy and early Indian chronology", in Bryant, Edwin; Patton, Laurie (eds.), Indo-Aryan Controversy: Evidence and Inference in Indian History, Routledge
- Kaushik, Roy (2013). Military manpower, armies and warfare in South Asia. London: Pickering & Chatto. ISBN 978-1-84893-292-0. OCLC 827268432.
- Krishan, Yuvraj; Tadikonda, Kalpana K. (1996). The Buddha Image: Its Origin and Development. Bharatiya Vidya Bhavan. ISBN 978-81-215-0565-9.
- Krishnananda, Swami (1994). A Short History of Religious and Philosophic Thought in India. Rishikesh, India: Divine Life Society. ISBN 978-81-7052-108-2.
- Kulke, Hermann; Rothermund, Dietmar (1998), A History of India, Routledge, ISBN 978-0-415-32920-0
- Kuzmina, Elena E. (2007). The Origin of the Indo-Iranians. Brill. ISBN 978-90-04-16054-5.
- Lal, B. B. (1996). "The Painted Grey Ware Culture of the Iron Age" (PDF). In Ahmad Hasan Dani; V. M. Masson (eds.). History of civilizations of Central Asia. Vol. 1: The dawn of civilisation – Earliest times to 700 B. C. Paris: UNESCO Publishing. ISBN 978-92-3-102719-2. OCLC 760610934.
- Long, Jeffrey D. (2013), Jainism: An Introduction, I.B. Tauris
- Majumdar, Ramesh Chandra (1977), Ancient India, Motilal Banarsidass, ISBN 978-81-208-0436-4
- Mallory, J. P.; Adams, D. Q. (2006), The Oxford Introduction to Proto-Indo-European and the Proto-Indo-European World, Oxford University Press
- Mishra, Anup (2007), "Chalcolithic Black and Red Ware of Balathal, Upaidur, Rajasthan: A Study", Indian History Congress, 68: 1322–1339
- McClish, Mark; Olivelle, Patrick (2012), "Introduction", in M. McClish; P. Olivelle (eds.), The Arthasastra: Selections from the Classic Indian Work on Statecraft, Hackett Publishing, p. xxiv, ISBN 978-1-60384-903-6
- Michaels, Axel (2004), Hinduism. Past and present, Princeton, New Jersey: Princeton University Press
- Narasimhan, Vagheesh M.; Anthony, David; Mallory, James; Reich, David (2019), "The formation of human populations in South and Central Asia", Science, 365 (6457) eaat7487, Bibcode:2019Sci...365t7487N, bioRxiv 10.1101/292581, doi:10.1126/science.aat7487, PMC 6822619, PMID 31488661
- Narasimhan, Vagheesh M.; Patterson, Nick; Moorjani, Priya; Rohland, Nadin; Bernardos, Rebecca (2019). "The Formation of Human Populations in South and Central Asia". Science. 365 (6457). eaat7487. Bibcode:2019Sci...365t7487N. doi:10.1126/science.aat7487. ISSN 0036-8075. PMC 6822619. PMID 31488661.
- Nigal, Sahebrao Genu (1986). Axiological approach to the Vedas. New Delhi: Northern Book Centre. ISBN 81-85119-18-X.
- Olivelle, Patrick (1998), Upanis̥ads, Oxford University Press, ISBN 978-0-19-283576-5
- Panikkar, Raimundo (2001), The Vedic Experience: Mantramañjari, Bangalore: Motilal Banarsidass, ISBN 81-208-1280-8
- Parpola, Asko (2015), The Roots of Hinduism. The Early Aryans and the Indus Civilization, Oxford University Press
- Paul, Pran Gopal; Paul, Debjani (1989). "Brahmanical Imagery in the Kuṣāṇa Art of Mathurā: Tradition and Innovations". East and West. 39 (1–4): 111–143. JSTOR 29756891.
- Pletcher, Kenneth (2010). The History of India. Britannica Educational Publishing.
- Proferes, Theodore (2003). "Kuru kings, Tura Kavaseya and the -tvaya Gerund". Bulletin of the School of Oriental and African Studies. 66 (2): 210–219. doi:10.1017/S0041977X03000120. S2CID 162246125.
- Ratnagar, Shereen (2008). "The Aryan homeland debate in India". In P. L. Kohl; M. Kozelsky; N. Ben-Yehuda (eds.). Selective remembrances: archaeology in the construction, commemoration, and consecration of national pasts. pp. 349–378.
- Raychaudhuri, H. C. (1972). Political History of Ancient India. Calcutta: University of Calcutta Press.
- Reddy, K. Krishna (2011), Indian History, Tata McGraw-Hill Education, ISBN 978-0-07-132923-1
- Rocher, Ludo (1986), The Purāṇas, Otto Harrassowitz Verlag
- Samuel, Geoffrey (2010), The Origins of Yoga and Tantra. Indic Religions to the Thirteenth Century, Cambridge University Press
- Sen, S. N. (1999), Ancient Indian History And Civilization, New Age International, ISBN 978-81-224-1198-0
- Sharma, Ram Sharan (1990). Śūdras in Ancient India: A Social History of the Lower Order Down to Circa A.D. 600. Motilal Banarsidass. ISBN 978-81-208-0706-8.
- Shaw, Ian; Jameson, Robert (2008). A Dictionary of Archaeology. John Wiley & Sons. ISBN 978-0-470-75196-1.
- Singhal, K. C.; Gupta, Roshan (2003). The Ancient History of India, Vedic Period: A New Interpretation. New Delhi: Atlantic Publishers & Distributors. ISBN 8126902868.
- Singh, Upinder (2008), A History of Ancient and Early Mediaeval India: From the Stone Age to the 12th Century, Pearson Education India, ISBN 978-81-317-1120-0
- Singh, Upinder (2009), History of Ancient and Early Medieval India: From the Stone Age to the 12th Century, Longman, ISBN 978-8131716779
- Staal, Frits (2008), Discovering the Vedas: Origins, Mantras, Rituals, Insights, Penguin Books India, ISBN 978-0-14-309986-4
- Stein, Burton (2010), A History of India, John Wiley & Sons, ISBN 978-1-4443-2351-1
- Tignor, Robert L. (2014). Worlds together, worlds apart: A history of the world from the beginnings of humankind to the present (4th ed.). New York: W. W. Norton & Company. ISBN 978-0-393-92207-3. OCLC 854609153.
- Trigger, Bruce G. (2003). "States: City and Territorial". Understanding Early Civilizations: A Comparative Study. New York: Cambridge University Press. pp. 92–119. ISBN 978-0-521-82245-9.
- Winternitz, Moriz; Sarma, Vuppala Srinivasa (1981), A history of Indian literature: Introduction, Veda, epics, purānas and tantras, Motilal Banarsidass, ISBN 978-81-208-0264-3
- Witzel, Michael (1989), "Tracing the Vedic dialects", Dialectes dans les Litteratures Indo-Aryennes ed. Caillat, Paris, 97–265.
- Witzel, Michael (1995), "Early Sanskritization. Origins and Development of the Kuru State" (PDF), Electronic Journal of Vedic Studies, 1 (4): 1–26, archived from the original (PDF) on 11 June 2007
- Witzel, Michael (2001). "Autochthonous Aryans? The Evidence from Old Indian and Iranian Texts" (PDF). Electronic Journal of Vedic Studies. 7 (3): 1–115.
- Witzel, Michael (2005). "Vedas and Upaniṣads". In Gavin Flood (ed.). The Blackwell companion to Hinduism (1st paperback ed.). Oxford: Blackwell Publishing. pp. 68–71. ISBN 1-4051-3251-5.
- Witzel, Michael (2019). "Beyond the Flight of the Falcon: Early 'Aryans' Within and Outside India". In Romila Thapar (ed.). Which of Us are Aryans?: Rethinking the Concept of Our Origins. Aleph. pp. 1–29. ISBN 978-93-88292-38-2.
- Woodard, Roger D. (18 August 2006). Indo-European Sacred Space: Vedic and Roman Cult. University of Illinois Press. ISBN 978-0-252-09295-4.
- Zahir, Muhammad (15 April 2016), The Gandhara Grave Culture: New Perspectives on Protohistoric Cemeteries in Northern and Northwestern Pakistan, pp. 274–293
