= Bishkent culture =

Bronze Age archaeological culture of Tajikistan

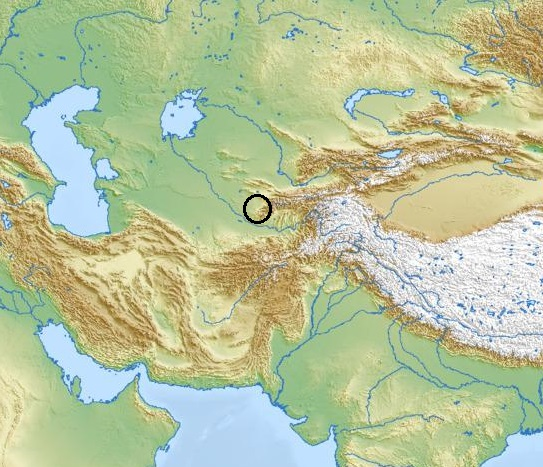
- Geographical range: Southern Tajikistan
- Period: Bronze Age
- Dates: ca. 2800–2400 BC

The Bishkent culture or Beshkent culture is a Bronze Age archaeological culture of southern Tajikistan, recently dated to c. 2800 – 2400 BC. It is primarily known from its cemeteries, which appear to have been used by mobile pastoralists, but currently considered to be a small group of people moving towards Tajikistan from Swat valley or Baluchistan, just as it was found in the early necropolis of Tulkhar.

According to J. P. Mallory, "the Bishkent culture has been seen as a possible contributor to the Swat culture, which in turn is often associated with early Indo-Aryan movements into northwest India."

== Characteristics ==
The culture is named after the Beshkent valley in southern Tajikistan and is known mainly from its cemeteries, including early Tulkhar. Graves of the Beshkent type held the cremated remains of dismembered bodies in stone cists and catacomb graves, and fire was used ritually in the burials. Grave goods included pottery and metal and stone artefacts, some of them similar to steppe material, along with objects of the Bactria–Margiana Archaeological Complex and finds from the neighbouring Vakhsh culture.

Earlier scholarship dated the early Tulkhar cemetery to the Late Bronze Age, around 1600–1500 BC, and linked it to the steppe Andronovo culture because of its cremations and stone-box graves. Some Early Tulkhar burials also show posthumous trepanation. The Vakhsh culture of the neighbouring Vakhsh valley, known mainly from kurgan burial grounds in which the dead were placed in a crouching position and handmade vessels had carved decoration, is generally regarded as having followed the Bishkent culture.

== See also ==
- Vakhsh culture
- Chust culture
- Yaz culture

== Sources ==
- Mallory, J. P.; Adams, Douglas Q. (1997). "Bishkent culture". Encyclopedia of Indo-European Culture. Taylor & Francis. p. 68. ISBN 1884964982.
- Sotnikova, Svetlana. V. (2024). "Materials of the Early Tulkhar necropolis in the light of the hypothesis of Andronovo population migration to the south: problems of chronology". Ufa Archaeological Herald. 24 (4): 644–660. doi:10.31833/uav/2024.24.4.042.
