= Vakhsh culture =

Archaeological culture

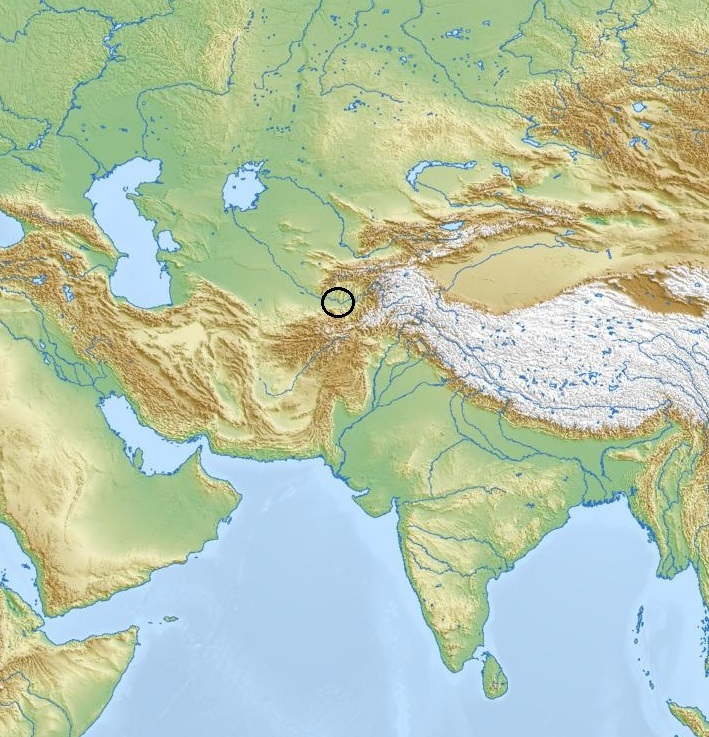
- Geographical range: Lower Vakhsh River
- Period: Bronze Age
- Dates: 2500–1650 BC
- Preceded by: Bishkent culture
- Followed by: ?

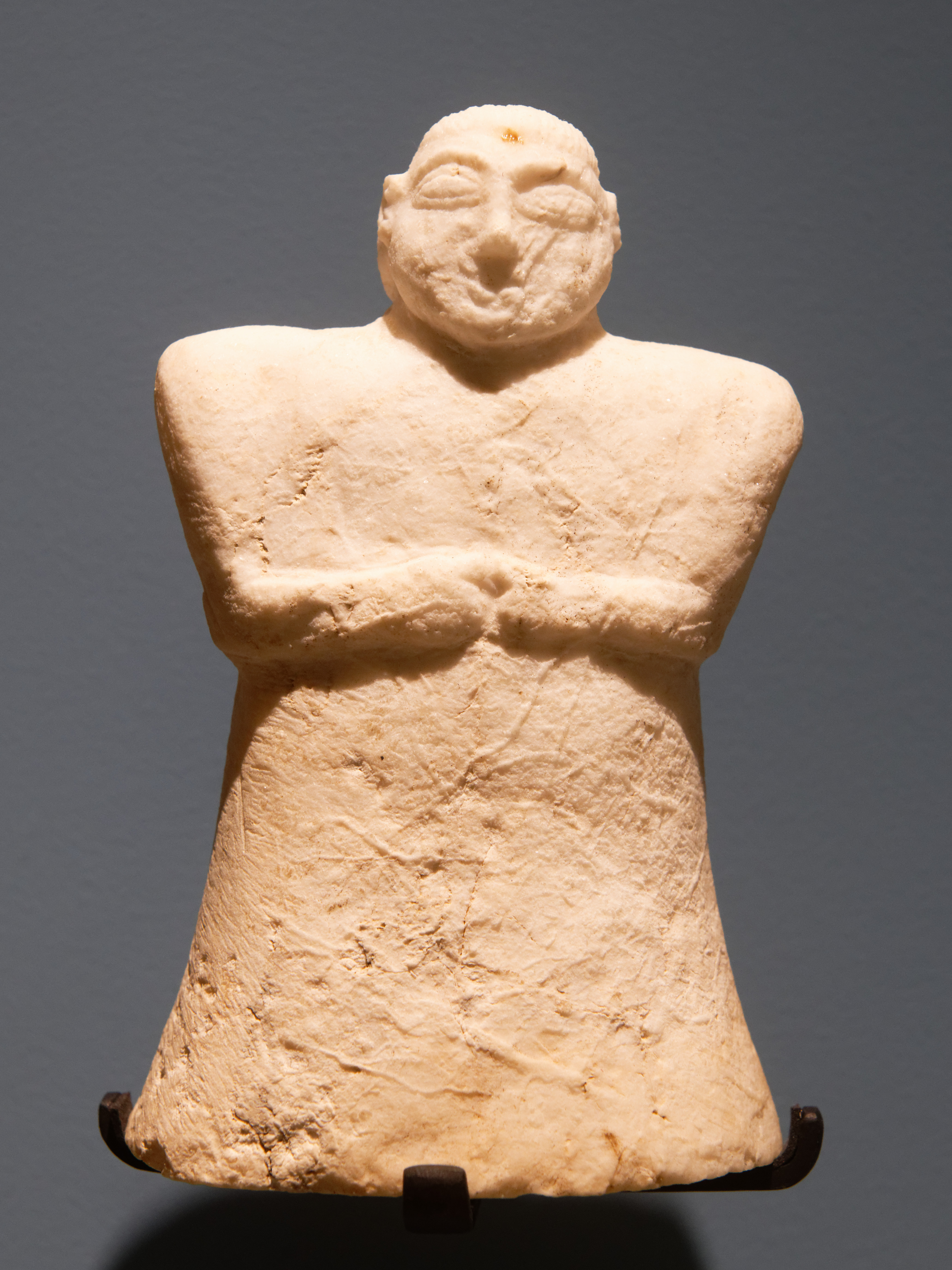
Anthropomorphic statuette (orant?) in soft stone (anhydrite) from the burial ground of Gelot, Tajikistan, late 3rd millennia–early 2nd millennia BC

The Vakhsh culture is a Bronze Age culture which took place around 2500–1650 BC, as shown by radiocarbon dates, and flourished along the lower Vakhsh River in southern Tajikistan, earlier thought to be from ca. 1700 BC to 1500 BC.

Earlier research seemed to show that Vakhsh culture had appeared somewhat later than the Bishkent culture, with which it shares many similarities.

== Settlements ==
Evidence of settlements in the Vakhsh culture is scant. They made stone walls and mud-brick constructions. Houses on the site at Kangurt Tut in the Vaksh valley contained storage pits for grain and hearths. The grain storages had barley and wheat. Faunal remains have revealed dogs, deer, camels, donkeys, horses, sheep and goats.

== Burials ==
The Vaksh culture is known chiefly for its burials. These were catacomb graves covered entirely over with a mound, and entrance shafts blocked by earth and stones. A quarter of the tombs was associated with the ritual of fire. Males were buried on their right side while females were generally buried on their left. Both male and female remains were oriented to the north. Graves sometimes served as cenotaphs. On occasion, clay figurines would replace the remains of the deceased. Vakhsh graves are typically poor in grave goods. 30% of the vessels are wheel-thrown, while hand-made pottery predominated. This is typical of a pastoral society. Metal remains are scant, but include razor-like knives and mirrors. Arrowheads were made of bone and flint.

== Ceramics and relationships ==
Vakhsh culture ceramics are a mixture of steppe wares and those ascribed to the Bactria–Margiana Archaeological Complex. Some have interpreted this as a sign that the Vakhsh culture represented a mixture of settled agriculturalists and steppe populations originating in the north. Some have identified the Vakhsh culture as a southern extension of the Andronovo culture, but Mike Teufer considers it is not related to Andronovo, but to communities of Altai-Xinjiang area. Like the Bishkent culture, the Vakhsh culture has been linked with the southward migration of the early Indo-Aryans.

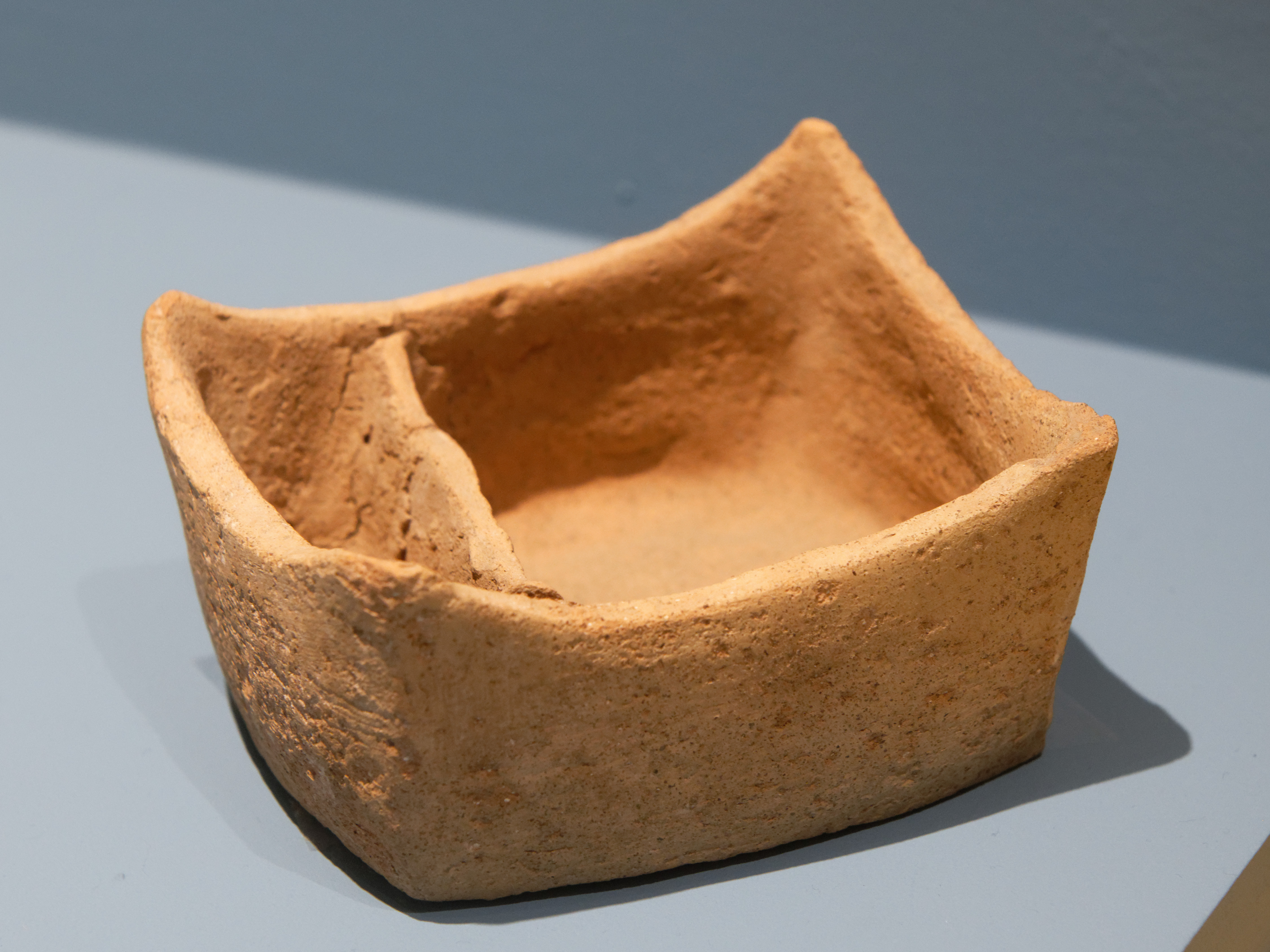
Model house from the necropolis of Farkhor/Parkhar, Tajikistan, middle–late 3rd millennium BC.

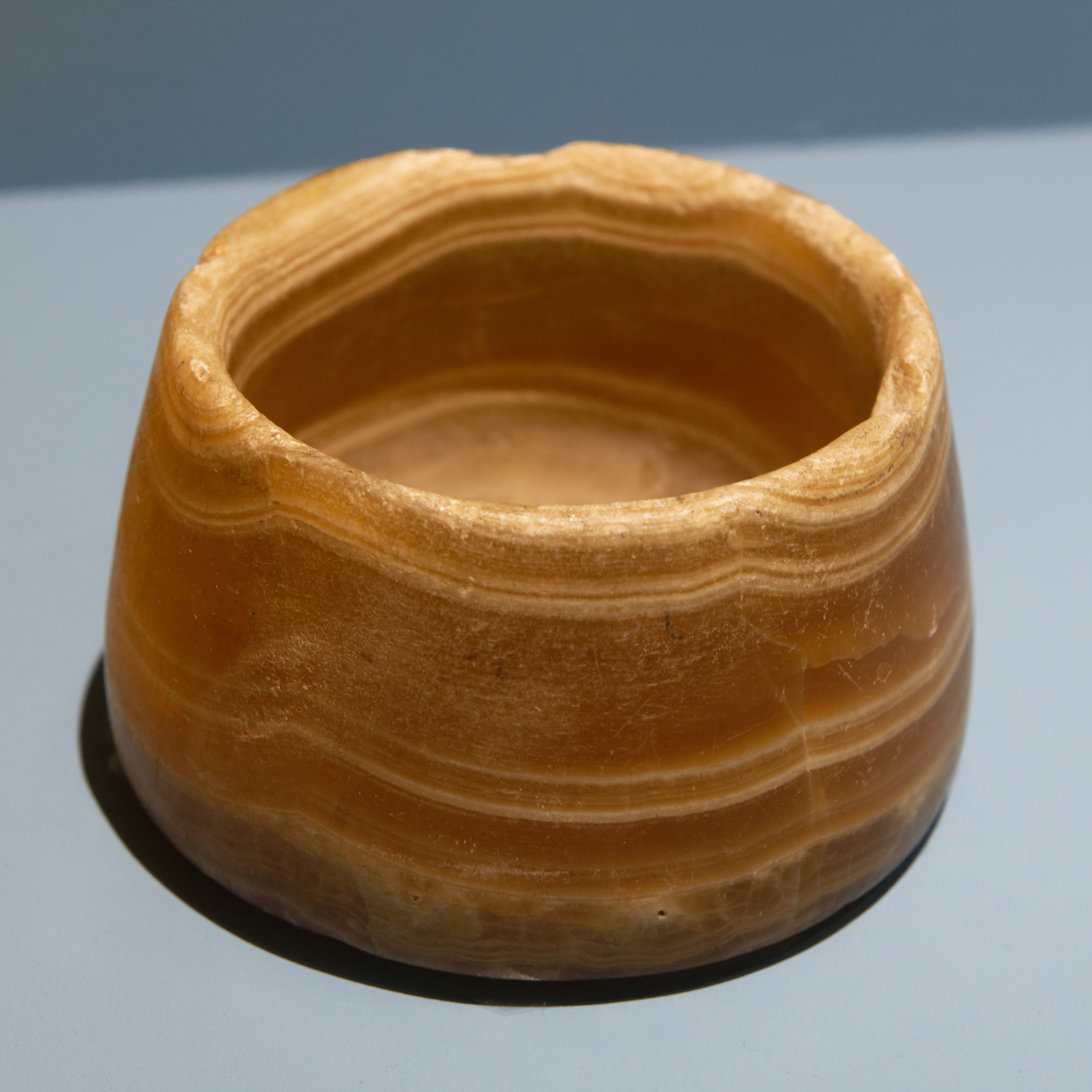
Vessel from the necropolis of Farkhor/Parkhar, Tajikistan, middle–late 3rd millennium BC.

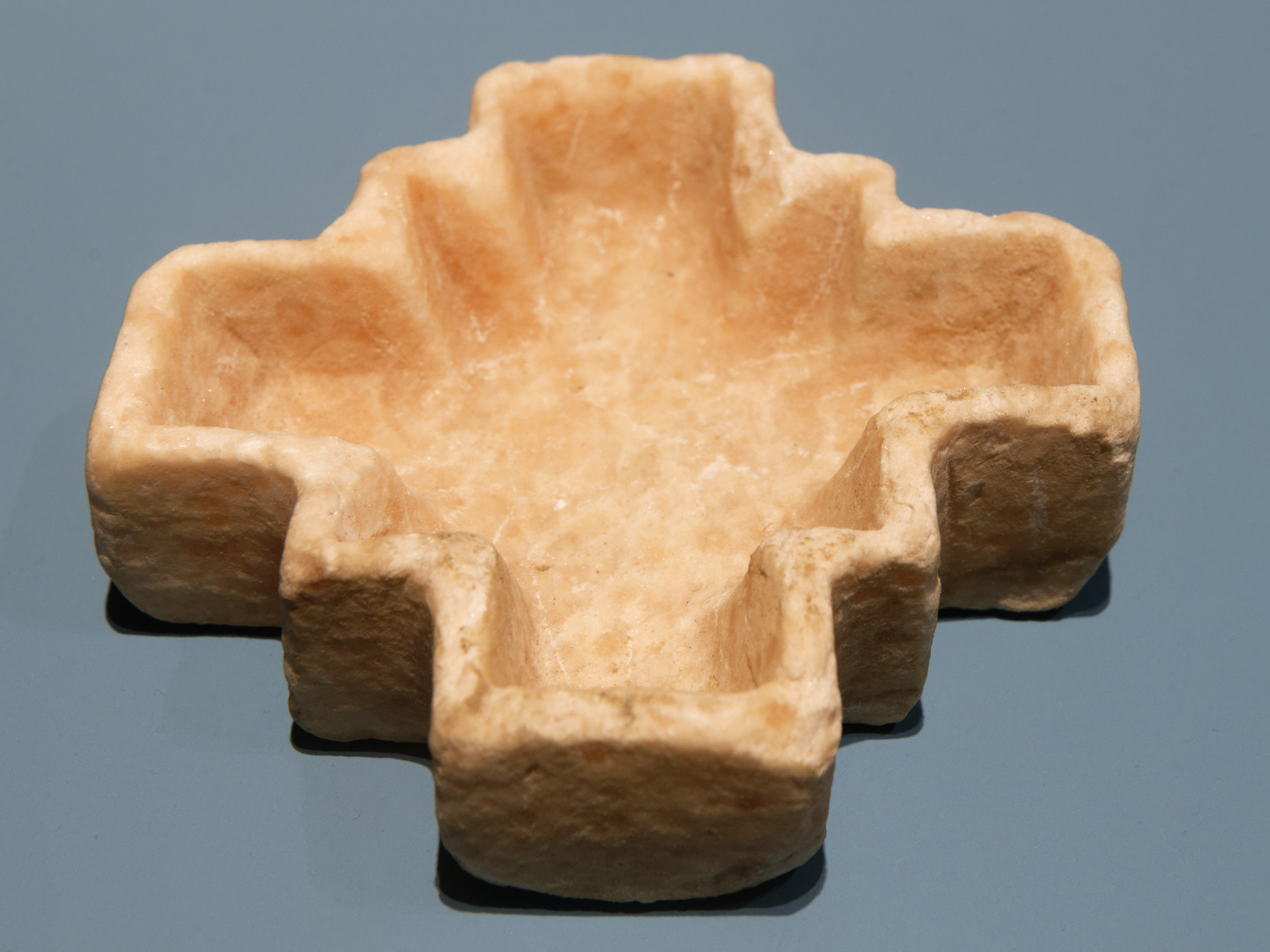
Cross-shaped ritual vase from the necropolis of Farkhor/Parkhar, Tajikistan, middle–late 3rd millennium BC.

== New archaeological research ==
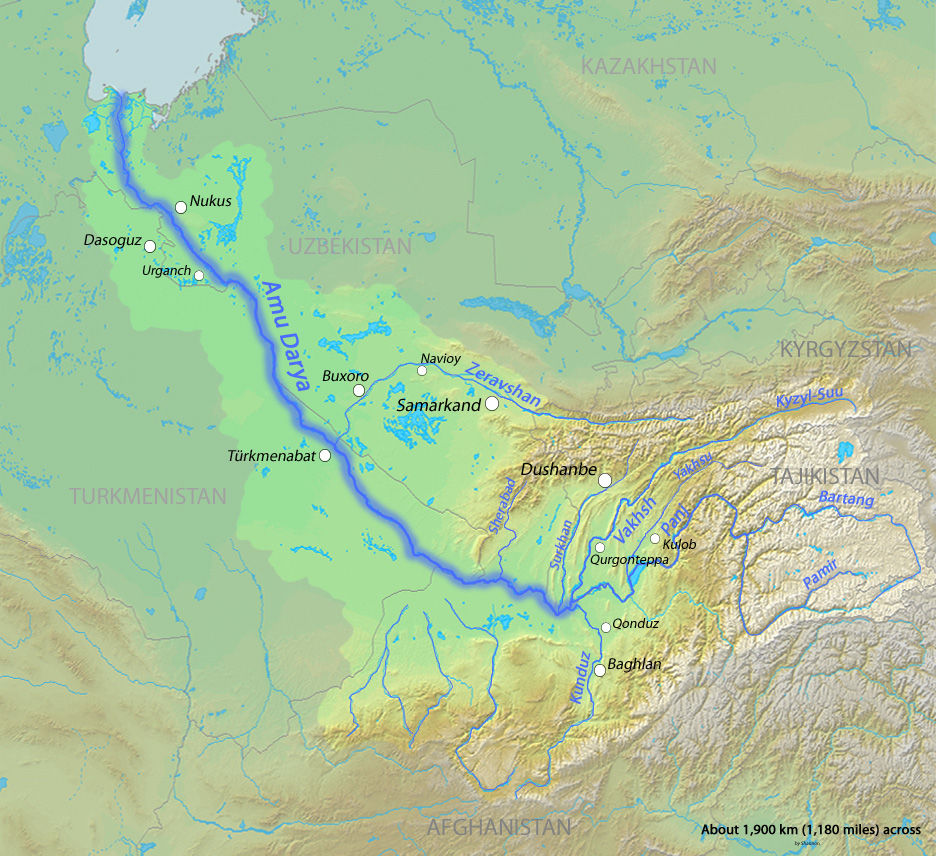
Location of Vakhsh river as affluent of Oxus river

Mike Teufer, in his 2020 publication, informs that recent archaeological research in southwestern Tajikistan at three cemeteries in Gelot (Kulob District), Darnajchi, and Farkhor, present features that belong to Vakhsh culture. Grave 13 from Gelot, in necropolis 6, dated to 2197-2049 cal BC (1 sigma) and 2203-2036 call BC (2 sigma) contained a round-bottomed pot of type IIIB, a bowl of type IVG, and a carinated beaker of type ICa, and all these vessel types are similar to the pottery found in kurgans of the "classical Vakhsh culture." In Farkhor, the presence of type IAa vessels also offer evidence for the early dating of Vakhsh culture, appearing already in the middle of the 3rd millennium BC, in the transition from Namazga periods IV and V. Darmajchi's grave 2 also presented a high dating, 2456-2140 cal BC (2 sigma).

Teufer also comments that: "It is therefore evident that the Vakhsh culture is more likely a phenomenon of the 3rd millennium than of the 2nd millennium BC. However, unlike the 'classical Vakhsh graves', the tombs at Gelot and Darnajchi have no visible aboveground, kurgan-like construction and should therefore be distinguished from them. The underground part of the tomb is nevertheless similar - namely, a simple pit (Gelot, necropolis 6, grave 13) or catacomb (Darnajchi, necropolis 2, grave 2)."

== See also ==
- Yaz culture
- Chust culture
- Swat culture
- Tazabagyab culture
- Zeravshan (river)

== Sources ==
- Mallory, J. P.; Adams, Douglas Q. (1997). "Vakhsh Culture". Encyclopedia of Indo-European Culture. Taylor & Francis. pp. 617–618. ISBN 1884964982.
