= Chust culture =

Archaeological culture

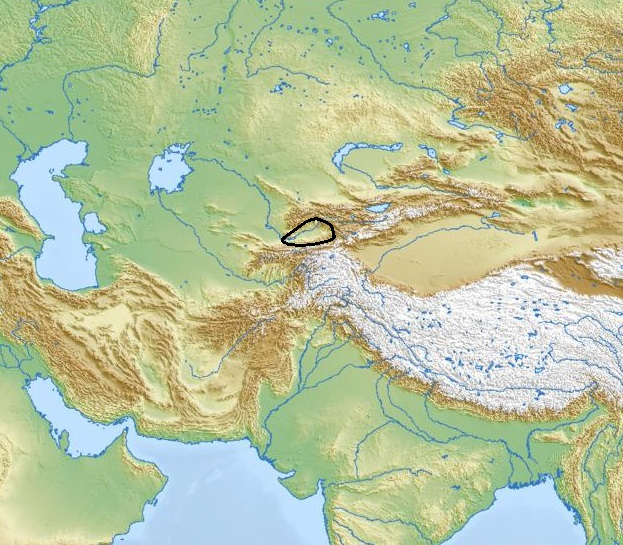
- Geographical range: Fergana Valley
- Period: Late Bronze Age to early Iron Age
- Dates: ca. 1500–900 BC
- Preceded by: Tazabagyab culture
- Followed by: Burgulyuk culture

The Chust culture is a late Bronze Age and early Iron Age culture which flourished in the Fergana Valley of eastern Uzbekistan from ca. 1500 BC to 900 BC.

Settlements of the Chust culture varied in size between small dwelling sites to large settlements over 10 ha in size. Some sites occupy hilltop locations, while others indicate the presence of defensive structures. Domestic structures are not well known, with some built of mud-bricks.

Large pits appear frequently in Chust sites. These were probably intended for the storage of grain. Barley, wheat and particularly millet have been recovered, along with agricultural tools such as sickles and hoes.

Domestic animals that were part of the Chust culture include camels, asses, horses, cattle, sheep, goat and probably pig. Wild animals that appeared in their territories include onagers, gazelles and saiga antilope.

Chust pottery was hand-made. They created both bronze objects and later iron objects. Objects made of bronze include spearheads and knives.

Chust burials were normally in pits at the edge of settlements. Such pits often included both human and animal remains. Sometimes they contain hoards of skulls.

The stone knives and sickles of the Chust culture, and its painted pottery, is similar to that of contemporary cultures further east in Xinjiang.

The human remains of the Chust culture are of the Europoid type. Its people are generally considered Iranian. It has been suggested that they were part of an Iranian movement to the east, or perhaps a group of Iranians who were retreating westwards from Xinjiang. It is one of the earliest sedentary Iranian cultures.

== See also ==
- Yaz culture
- Vakhsh culture
- Bishkent culture

== Sources ==
- Mallory, J. P.; Adams, Douglas Q. (1997). "Chust Culture". Encyclopedia of Indo-European Culture. Taylor & Francis. p. 107. ISBN 1884964982.
