= Loe Banr =

- Location within Pakistan
- Coordinates: 34.44°N 72.23°E
- Country: Pakistan
- Province: Khyber Pakhtunkhwa
- Elevation: 1,085 m (3,560 ft)
- Time zone: UTC+5 (PST)

Loe Banr, also spelt Sayed Abad loyband

is a village in Swat District of Khyber Pakhtunkhwa. It is located at 34°44'50N 72°23'30E with an altitude of 1085 metres (3562 feet). Italian archaeologists have unearthed ancient tombs and other things in the area.
