= Yaz culture =

Early Iron Age culture of Margiana, Bactria and Sogdia

Coordinates: 37.7517°N 61.9984°E

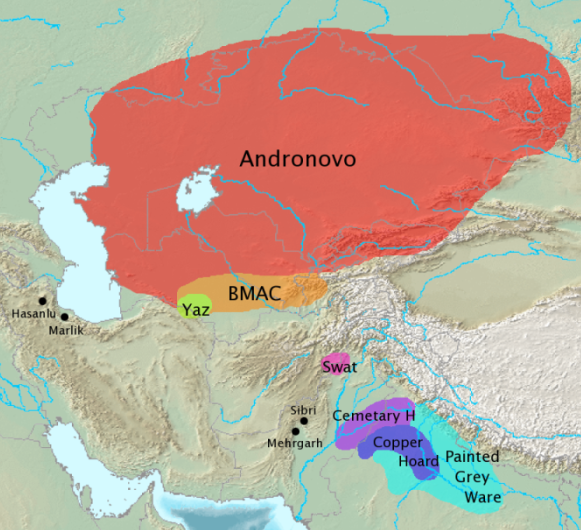
- Archaeological cultures associated with Indo-Iranian migrations (after EIEC). The Andronovo, BMAC and Yaz cultures have often been associated with Indo-Iranian migrations. The GGC (Swat), Cemetery H, Copper Hoard and PGW cultures are candidates for cultures associated with Indo-Aryan migrations.
- Period: Early Iron Age c. 1500–500 BC or c. 1500–330 BC
- Type site: Yaz-Tappe, Yaz Tepe, or Yaz Depe, near Baýramaly, Turkmenistan
- Preceded by: Bactria–Margiana Archaeological Complex; Andronovo culture
- Followed by: Bactria; Margiana; Sogdia; Dahae

The Yaz culture (named after the type site Yaz-Tappe, Yaz Tepe, or Yaz Depe, near Baýramaly, Turkmenistan) was an early Iron Age culture of Margiana, Bactria and Sogdia (c. 1500–500 BC, or c. 1500–330 BC). It emerges at the top of late Bronze Age sites (BMAC), sometimes as mud-brick platforms and sizeable houses associated with irrigation systems. Ceramics were mostly hand-made, but there was increasing use of wheel-thrown ware. Bronze and iron arrowheads, iron sickles and carpet knives are among other artifacts that have been found.

With the farming citadels and absence of burials it has been regarded as a likely archaeological reflection of early East Iranian culture as described in the Avesta. So far, no burials related to the culture have been found, and this is taken as possible evidence of the Zoroastrian practice of exposure or sky burial.

== Overview ==
=== Yaz I ===
In the region of Southern Central Asia, the Bronze Age Oxus civilization (or BMAC) was characteristic for irrigation and proto-state society based on long distance trade of raw materials and goods. However, it suddenly disappeared in the Late Bronze Age (c. 1900–1500 BC), and in its place emerged the Early Iron Age (c. 1500/1400 – 1000 BC) Yaz I culture with rural settlements based around fortified structures, control of irrigation systems, with specific hand-made ceramic type, as well as the almost complete disappearance of graves, compared to thousands of kurgans in the north. The ceramics, and spherical stone maces, show continuity and contemporaneity between Yaz Depe and Ulug Depe of the Early Iron Age and Tekkem Depe among others of the Namazga-Tepe VI period.

Yaz I culture is argued to be related to the sedentarisation of the nomadic Indo-Iranians in the Eurasian Steppe, a synthesis with autochthonous traits. It extended from the central part of the Kopet Dag mountains to the fertile delta of the Murghab River. It is characterised for total lack of necropolises and tombs, as well as painted ceramic with triangle and ladder patterns. Recent research shows four groups of patterns, the triangular (triangles and chevrons), lozenges, bands, and of additional elements. It seems to be connected to the Chust culture of Fergana Valley, Mundigak V–VI in Sistan, and Pirak I–III on the Kacchi Plain. Compared to the Chust culture, no tombs from the Yaz culture have been found. Asko Parpola and Fred Hiebert argued that these cultures seemingly derived from the Haladun culture (1750–1200 BC) of Xinjiang, and some Andronovo culture contacts. The introduction of the culture is seemingly related to the sound change *s > h when Iranian language came in the Indo-Iranian borderlands of Rgvedic tribes around 1500 BC, seen in the change of the Vedic river Sindhu into Avestan Hindu (Indus River), Sarasvati into Harahvaiti.

=== Yaz II ===
It is dated circa 1100–700 or 1000–540 BC in Middle Iron Age, however some recent research consider no accurate boundary between the Yaz I and Yaz II. It moved to the north and northeast. It is characterized by wheel-made pottery type (reappearance of the wheel like in Namazga-Tepe V), iron metallurgy, large fortified sites, as well as the occupation of previous sites and the continuation of the funerary practices.

The Yaz II complex seemingly correlates with the Airyanem Vaejah, homeland of those tribes who spoke Avestan language, different from both Western and Eastern Iranian languages, to be replaced in Bactria by the former at the end of the 1st millennium BC. Asko Parpola associated the change from Yaz I to Yaz II around 1000 BC with the migration of the Western Iranians (Medians, Persians). He considered that the Yaz I people spoke Proto-Eastern Iranian or Proto-Saka.

The ruins of the ancient city of Nad-i Ali (9th-8th century BC) which has been identified with the capital of the Kayanian dynasty kingdom which coincides with the Yaz II/A (10th–8th century BC), while date of the late Kayanian capital Balkh to Yaz II/B period (7th–6th century BC).

At the end of Yaz II/B (8th–7th/6th century BC) the Murghab oasis (Yaz Depe, Aravali Depe, Takhirbay Depe) became deserted. It is probably explained by the bloody revolt of Frada (521 BC) mentioned in Behistun Inscription in which reportedly 55,243 Margians were killed and 6,972 taken as prisoners, and the conquest of Bactria.

=== Yaz III ===
It is dated circa 700–400 BC, or second half of the 6th and end of the 4th century BC (c. 540–329 BC) in the Late Iron Age, part of the Achaemenid Empire period, but is still characterized by the same cultural and funerary continuity. The beak-shaped rim is replaced in form of a flattened roller, vessels are cylindrical-conical, and a bronze three-bladed arrow, iron axes and adzes were discovered.

== Name ==
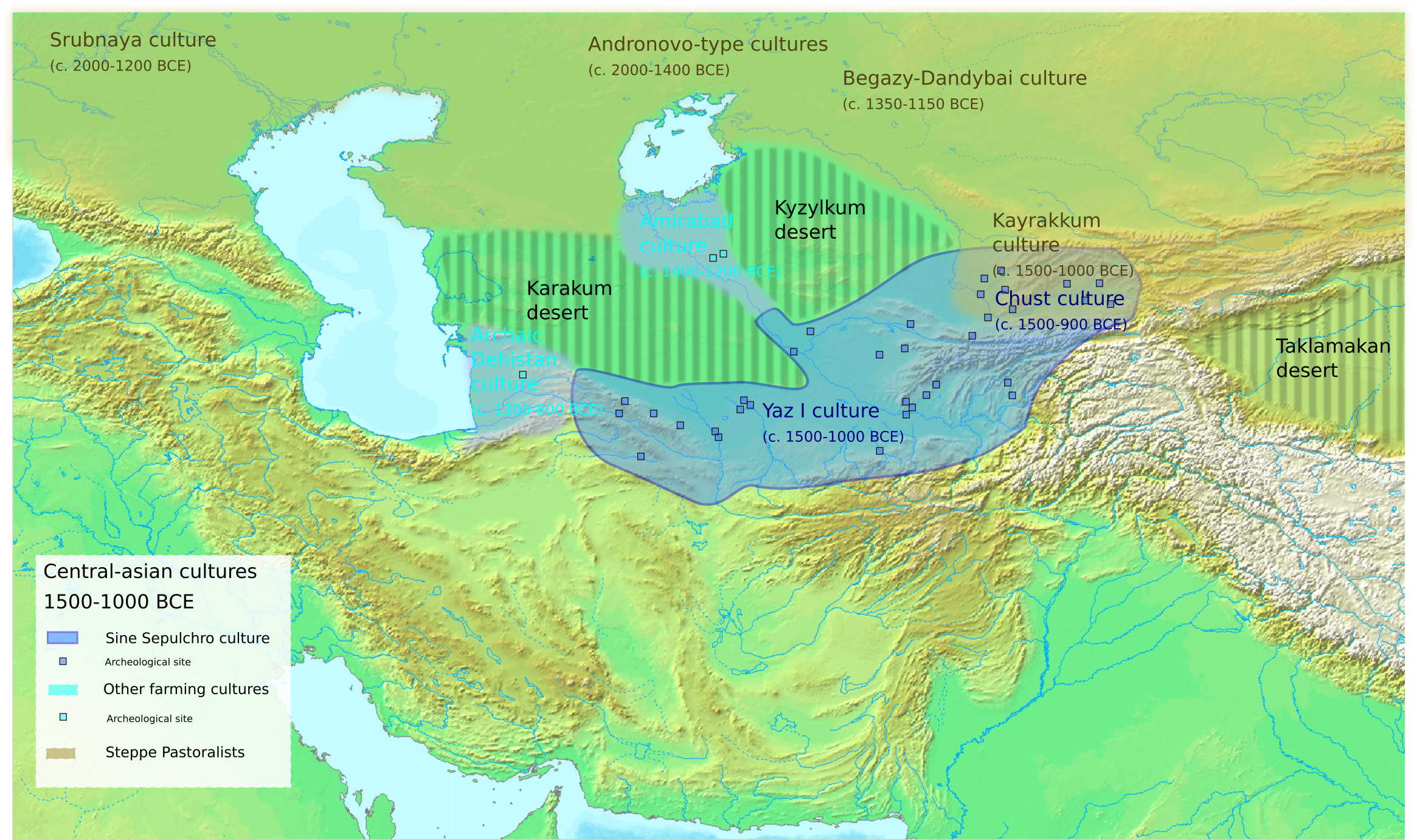
Sine Sepulchro culture compared to Yaz I according to Stark et al.

The widely used name Yaz for the Iron age cultures of southern Central Asia is derived from the type site Yaz-Tepe. Apart from this naming scheme, different authors have used other names to describe this phenomenon. A. A. Marushchenko initially introduced the term Epoch of Barbarian Occupation due to the "reduction of the area of the settlement and the decline of handcrafts" observed in the archeological record. This proposal was followed by other Soviet archeologists like A. F. Ganyalin and E. E. Kuz’mina.

Both the earlier BMAC culture as well as the later Yaz II period used wheel thrown ware. In contrast, Yaz I only used handmade ware which led to the use Handmade Painted Ware Cultures for this period. In addition, the Yaz culture, as well as the closely related Chust culture, is characterized by a widespread lack of burial sites, which led to the use of the term Sine Sepulchro (without graves) Cultural Complex.

== Research ==
The Yaz Tepe settlement was the central district in the then metropolitan part of Margiana. It covered 1 ha in Iron Age phase, and stood on brick platform mound 8 m high, while the stratigraphic excavations in the area revealed Yaz I (900–650 BC) complex (with bronze arrowheads and iron artefacts in Tillya Tepe), Yaz II (650–450 BC) and Yaz III (450–350 BC) house remains, although the chronology was later updated to Yaz I (ca. 1500/1400–1000 BC), Yaz II (ca. 1000–540 BC), and Yaz III (ca. 550–330 BC). The Yaz I complex was similar to those in northern Bactria, thus the culture was noted for the development of large settlements (sometime small) centred around fortified keeps built on massive platforms, but the excavations failed to locate the transition from the Late Bronze Age unlike other cultures. Other Margian well known sites with Yaz I ceramics are Gonur Tepe, Togoluk, Uch Tepe, Adam Basan, Taip, Garaoj Tepe, Takhirbaj Tepe.

Kuchuk Tepe settlement in Bactria (today Uzbekistan) is also related to the Yaz I culture. It looked like a flattened circular hill with an area of 0.5 hectares and height 8 m. The structures were built on a clay platform surrounded by a defensive wall. At the end of the first period (10th to mid-8th centuries BC) the building had twenty-five chambers; apparently it was a large fortified house, while towns start appearing in the region towards the end of that period. Other Bactrian well known sites with Yaz I ceramics are Tillya Tepe in northeastern Afghanistan, and Kyzyl Tepe, Dzharkutan, Kangurt-Tut, and Teguzak in Tajikistan. The single purely Yaz I site in Tajikistan is Karim-berdy which measures 500 x 300 m. Along the Kunduz River are located oasis Naibabad and Farukabad. The settlements at Bandykhan, between Shirabad and Denov in Uzbekistan, show Yaz I (14th–11th century BC), Yaz II/A (10th–9th/8th century BC), Yaz II/B (8th–7th/6th century BC), and Yaz III (6th–4th century BC).

Some Yaz I hand-made decorated pottery sites were investigated in southern Turkmenistan (previously northern Parthia). Some Yaz I strata was found in Parthia at Elken Depe, Ulug Depe and the northern mound at Anau, and all complexes overlie Namazga-Tepe VI type of Late Bronze Age strata. Unlike the Bronze Age centres, the Early Iron Age Yaz I settlements were much larger, in Elken Depe c. 12 ha, ringed with ramparts, while the citadel stood on a 6 m platform. At the site in Anau was found iron sickle from Yaz I period dated to the beginning of the 1st millennium BC. Askarov argued that it cannot be excluded that the Elken Depe was then the capital of northern Parthia.

There have been found 20 Iron Age sites of Yaz I–III culture (1400–300 BC) in Serakhs oasis, the sub delta of Tedjen River in southern Turkmenistan. The sites follow the irrigation system, with average distance of 123 m between sites and rivers, however there is some scientific uncertainty about the irrigations in the Iron Age. The average distance between Yaz sites is 879 m. Most of them are dated to Yaz II–III periods, but once was found Yaz I decorated pottery. In the northern cluster of the sites mostly there is no trace of later occupation, indicating they were abandoned in the Iron Age.

At the village Anaw east of Ashgabat in Turkmenistan are two mounds (kurgans), of which the south kurgan's Iron Age materials (Anaw IV) from ca. 900 to 650 BC, like ceramics and metals, are related to those of Yaz I.

Regarding Turkmenistan, many notable archaeologists investigated Yaz ceramic assemblage; A. F. Ganialin and A. A. Maruschenko considered northern pastoralist influence, V. M. Masson that it is connected to the Namazga-Tepe VI, but with a break of 100–150 years in-between, while V. Sarianidi that the Yaz I assemblage arrived from eastern Khorasan. There were differentiated three groups of hand-made ware in shape, color of sherd, and the admixture of crushed ceramics into the body of vessels. Recent research confirmed of the three the Masson's thesis that the Yaz I type ceramics in the foothill of Kopet Dag mountain are a natural development of the Late Bronze Age assemblage from Namazga VI period, but without any time lapse and external influence.

=== Burials ===
Several recent 2008–2012 discoveries of Early Iron Age burials on the sites of Dzharkutan in Surxondaryo Region of Uzbekistan, and Ulug Depe in Turkmenistan showed diverse funerary practices of the Iron Age in Central Asia. Burials still existed, but were not numerous. There were primary, secondary, multiple burials, and silo tombs, divided on seasonal and permanent dwellings. In the silos were buried mostly adult females, while in the others the head was mostly removed, indicating symbolic, cult or social reason.

== Connection to the early Iranians ==
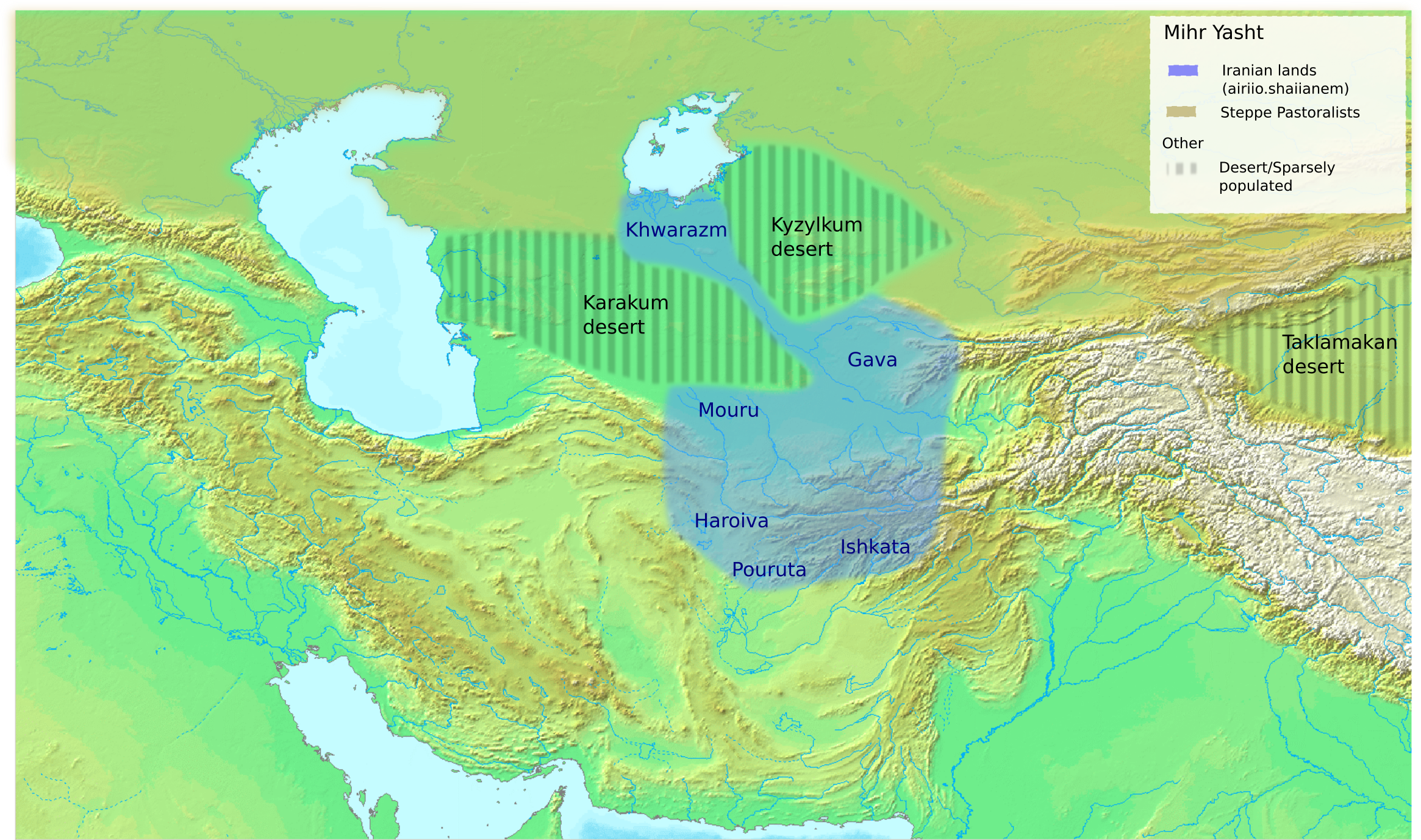
Approximate location of the place names mentioned in the Mihr Yasht of the Avesta as the area inhabited by the early Iranians

The Yaz culture is often discussed as a candidate for the culture of the early Iranians as described in the Avesta, i.e., the collection of religious literature of Zoroastrianism. Its texts were passed on orally for a long time, which makes an identification with a precise archeological culture difficult. Regardless, the identification of the Yaz culture with the civilization described in the Avesta is based on a number of factors that correlate the textual and archeological evidence.

First, the geographical horizon of the Avesta makes it clear that the Avestan people lived in the eastern portion of Greater Iran. As regards the time frame, the oldest texts are assumed to correspond to the late second millennium BCE, whereas the later texts were probably composed in the first half of the first millennium BCE. The Avesta is therefore probably connected with the southward movement of Iranian tribes from the Eurasian steppe into southern Central Asia and eventually onto the Iranian plateau during the late Bronze Age and early Iron Age.

Moreover, the archeological features of the Yaz I culture are seen as the results of the intrusion of nomadic Indo-Iranians from the northern Andronovo culture and their interaction with indigenous traditions from the preceding BMAC culture. This is also substantiated by the genetic makeup of Iranophone populations of southern Central Asia. A 2021 study by Kumar et al. shows how by the late Iron Age, the population of this region was characterised by a combination of BMAC and Andronovo ancestries. Likewise, a 2022 study also shows how the ancestry of modern Tajiks and Yaghnobis largely formed during the early Iron Age by a mixture between these two groups.

Finally, a lack of graves and excarnations emerged in the Early Iron Age, especially in Yaz I and II cultures, the same period in which Zoroastrianism developed (works such as the Gathas often being dated to the second half or end of the 2nd millennium BC); the contemporary occurrence falls in line with certain traditions (see Tower of Silence) and cultural schools of thought, but there is ongoing scholarly debate surrounding such a connection. There is evidence for excarnation in non-Zoroastrian cultures like those in Siberia and Mongolia, as well excarnation and dakhmas in some Bronze Age sites like Gonur Tepe and Altyndepe, thus it could have persisted into Early Iron Age as a notion for the long process of formation of the Proto-Zoroastrianism and Avesta.

== Legacy ==
Some sites which had Yaz culture layers like the Yaz Depe, Takhirbaj Depe, Taip, Gonur, Togoluk are on the UNESCO's World Heritage List of the State Historical and Cultural Park "Ancient Merv" (1999).

== See also ==
- Bactria–Margiana Archaeological Complex (BMAC)
- Indo-Iranians
- Vakhsh culture
- Bishkent culture
- Avestan period

== Sources ==
- Askarov, A. (1999), "The beginning of the Iron Age in Transoxiana", in Ahmad Hasan Dani; Vadim Mikhaĭlovich Masson (eds.), History of Civilizations of Central Asia, Motilal Banarsidass, ISBN 978-81-208-1407-3
- Buławka, Nazar (2009–2010), "Decorative motifs of the Early Iron Age (Yaz I) pottery in southern Turkmenistan", Światowit, 8 ((49)/A), Institute of Archaeology of the University of Warsaw, S2CID 126747961
- Buławka, Nazarij (2017), "The Yaz I–III Settlement Pattern in the Serakhs Oasis, Southern Turkmenistan", Iran, 55 (2): 143–170, doi:10.1080/05786967.2017.1355526, S2CID 194547743
- Bendezu-Sarmiento, Julio; Lhuillier, Johanna (2013), "Sine Sepulchro cultural complex of Transoxiana(between 1500 and the middle of the 1st Millennium BCE). Funerary Practices of the Iron Age in Southern Central Asia: Recent Work, old Data, and new Hypotheses", AMIT (45n)
- Boroffka, Nikolaus G. O.; Sverchkov, Leonid M. (2013), "The Jaz II and III period pottery. Classification and chronology viewed from Bandykhan, Southern Uzbekistan", in Marcin Wagner (ed.), Pottery chronology of the Early Iron Age in Central Asia, Kazimierz Michałowski Foundation, Institute of Archaeology, University of Warsaw, pp. 49–74n
- Buławka, Nazarij; Kaim, Barbara (2015), "The Iron Age in Serakhs Oasis (Turkmenistan). The Preliminary Results of the Application of Geographic Information System in the Study of the Settlement Pattern of the Earliest Confirmed Occupation of the Oasis", Keep The Revolution Going. Proceedings of the 43rd Annual Conference on Computer Applications and Quantitative Methods in Archaeology, Oxford: Archaeopress, ISBN 978-1-784-91338-9, S2CID 133882093
- Daniel, Elton L. (2012). The History of Iran. Greenwood. ISBN 978-0313375095.
- Diakonoff, Igor M. (1985), "Media", in Gershevitch, Ilya (ed.), The Cambridge History of Iran, Volume 2: The Median and Achaemenian periods, Cambridge University Press, ISBN 978-0-521-20091-2
- Frankfort, Henri-Paul (2001). "The archaeology of protohistoric Central Asia and the problems of identifying Indo-European and Uralic-speaking populations". Early contacts between Uralic and Indo-European. Helsinki: Suomalais-ugrilainen Seura.
- Hintze, Almut (2015). "Zarathustra's Time and Homeland - Linguistic Perspectives". In Stausberg, Michael; Vevaina, Yuhan S.-D.; Tessmann, Anna (eds.). The Wiley Blackwell Companion to Zoroastrianism. John Wiley & Sons, Ltd. ISBN 9781118785539.
- Khlopina, K. I. (2015), "Namazga-depe and the Late Bronze Age of Southern Turkmenia", in Philip L. Kohl (ed.), The Bronze Age Civilization of Central Asia: Recent Soviet Discoveries, Routledge, ISBN 978-1-317-28225-9
- Kuzmina, Elena E. (2007), J.P. Mallory (ed.), The Origin of the Indo-Iranians, BRILL, ISBN 978-90-474-2071-2
- Kuzmina, E. E. (2008), Victor H. Mair (ed.), The Prehistory of the Silk Road, University of Pennsylvania Press, ISBN 978-0-8122-4041-2
- Lhuillier, Johanna (2013). "The "Painted ware cultures" in Central Asia: An overview of the ceramic assemblage of the 2nd half of the IInd millennium BCE". Iranica Antiqua. 48. doi:10.2143/IA.48.0.2184697.
- Lhuillier, Johanna (2022). "Intercultural Interactions of the Sine Sepulchro Cultural Community (Handmade Painted Ware Cultures) of the Early Iron Age with the Neighbouring Cultures of Asia and the Near East". Cultures in Contact: Central Asia as Focus of Trade, Cultural Exchange and Knowledge Transmission. Wiesbaden: Harrassowitz Verlag. ISBN 978-3-447-11880-4.
- Lamberg-Karlovsky, C.C. (2005), "Archaeology and Language: The Case of the Indo-Iranians", in Edwin Francis Bryant; Laurie L. Patton (eds.), The Indo-Aryan Controversy: Evidence and Inference in Indian History, Psychology Press, ISBN 978-0-7007-1463-6
- Mallory, J. P.; Adams, Douglas Q. (1997), Encyclopedia of Indo-European Culture, Taylor & Francis, ISBN 9781884964985
- Parpola, Asko (1995), "The problem of the Aryans and the Soma: Textual-linguistic and archaeological evidence", in George Erdosy (ed.), The Indo-Aryans of Ancient South Asia: Language, Material Culture and Ethnicity, Walter de Gruyter, ISBN 978-3-11-014447-5
- Parpola, Asko; Carpelan, Christian (2005), "The cultural counterparts to Proto-Indo-European, Proto-Uralic and Proto-Aryan: Matching the dispersal and contact patterns in the linguistic and archaeological record", in Edwin Francis Bryant; Laurie L. Patton (eds.), The Indo-Aryan Controversy: Evidence and Inference in Indian History, Psychology Press, ISBN 978-0-7007-1463-6
- Parpola, Asko (2012), "The formation of the Aryan branch of Indo-European", in Roger Blench; Matthew Spriggs (eds.), Archaeology and Language III: Artefacts, Languages and Texts, Routledge, ISBN 978-1-134-85586-5
- Parpola, Asko (2015), The Roots of Hinduism: The Early Aryans and the Indus Civilization, Oxford University Press, ISBN 978-0-19-022691-6
- Skjaervø, P. Oktor (1995). "The Avesta as source for the early history of the Iranians". In Erdosy, George (ed.). The Indo-Aryans of Ancient South Asia. De Gruyter. ISBN 9783110144475.
- Witzel, Michael (2000). "The Home of the Aryans". In Hinze, A.; Tichy, E. (eds.). Festschrift für Johanna Narten zum 70. Geburtstag (PDF). J. H. Roell. doi:10.11588/xarep.00000114.
