= Otradny, Russia =

Otradny (Russian: Отрадный; masculine), Otradnaya (Отрадная; feminine), or Otradnoye (Отрадное; neuter) is the name of several inhabited localities in Russia.

== Republic of Adygea ==
As of 2012, two rural localities in the Republic of Adygea bear this name:

- Otradny, Koshekhablsky District, Republic of Adygea, a khutor in Koshekhablsky District; 44°57′N 40°21′E
- Otradny, Takhtamukaysky District, Republic of Adygea, a settlement in Takhtamukaysky District; 44°52′N 38°57′E

== Altai Krai ==
As of 2012, one rural locality in Altai Krai bears this name:

- Otradnoye, Altai Krai, a selo in Semeno-Krasilovsky Selsoviet of Kytmanovsky District; 53°41′N 85°40′E

== Belgorod Oblast ==
As of 2012, two rural localities in Belgorod Oblast bear this name:

- Otradnoye, Belgorodsky District, Belgorod Oblast (or Otradny), a selo in Belgorodsky District; 50°25′N 36°20′E
- Otradnoye, Volokonovsky District, Belgorod Oblast, a settlement in Shidlovsky Rural Okrug of Volokonovsky District; 50°34′N 37°37′E

== Bryansk Oblast ==
As of 2012, two rural localities in Bryansk Oblast bear this name:

- Otradnoye, Bryansky District, Bryansk Oblast, a selo in Otradnensky Rural Administrative Okrug of Bryansky District; 53°19′N 34°11′E
- Otradnoye, Novozybkovsky District, Bryansk Oblast, a settlement in Starokrivetsky Rural Administrative Okrug of Novozybkovsky District; 52°35′N 32°14′E

== Republic of Crimea ==
As of 2014, three inhabited localities in Republic of Crimea bear this name:

Urban localities

- Otradnoye, Yalta, Republic of Crimea, an urban-type settlement under the administrative jurisdiction of the town of republic significance of Yalta

Rural localities

- Otradnoye, Bakhchisaraysky District, Republic of Crimea, a selo in Bakhchisaraysky District
- Otradnoye, Dzhankoysky District, Republic of Crimea, a selo in Dzhankoysky District

== Irkutsk Oblast ==
As of 2012, one rural locality in Irkutsk Oblast bears this name:

- Otradnaya, Irkutsk Oblast, a village in Alarsky District

== Kaliningrad Oblast ==
As of 2012, three rural localities in Kaliningrad Oblast bear this name:

- Otradnoye, Chernyakhovsky District, Kaliningrad Oblast, a settlement in Svobodnensky Rural Okrug of Chernyakhovsky District
- Otradnoye, Guryevsky District, Kaliningrad Oblast, a settlement in Khrabrovsky Rural Okrug of Guryevsky District
- Otradnoye, Ozyorsky District, Kaliningrad Oblast, a settlement in Novostroyevsky Rural Okrug of Ozyorsky District

== Khabarovsk Krai ==
As of 2012, one rural locality in Khabarovsk Krai bears this name:

- Otradnoye, Khabarovsk Krai, a selo in Vyazemsky District

== Kostroma Oblast ==
As of 2012, one rural locality in Kostroma Oblast bears this name:

- Otradny, Kostroma Oblast, a settlement in Pokrovskoye Settlement of Oktyabrsky District; 58°59′N 47°1′E

== Krasnodar Krai ==
As of 2012, three rural localities in Krasnodar Krai bear this name:

- Otradnoye, Krasnodar Krai, a selo in Solokhaulsky Rural Okrug under the administrative jurisdiction of Lazarevsky City District under the administrative jurisdiction of the City of Sochi; 43°49′N 39°37′E
- Otradnaya, Otradnensky District, Krasnodar Krai, a stanitsa in Otradnensky Rural Okrug of Otradnensky District; 44°24′N 41°31′E
- Otradnaya, Tikhoretsky District, Krasnodar Krai (or Otradnoye), a stanitsa in Otradnensky Rural Okrug of Tikhoretsky District; 45°37′N 40°7′E

== Kurgan Oblast ==
As of 2012, one rural locality in Kurgan Oblast bears this name:

- Otradnoye, Kurgan Oblast, a selo in Zaykovsky Selsoviet of Shchuchansky District; 55°17′N 62°52′E

== Kursk Oblast ==
As of 2012, three rural localities in Kursk Oblast bear this name:

- Otradnoye, Pristensky District, Kursk Oblast, a khutor in Sazanovsky Selsoviet of Pristensky District
- Otradnoye, Solntsevsky District, Kursk Oblast, a village in Vorobyevsky Selsoviet of Solntsevsky District
- Otradnoye, Timsky District, Kursk Oblast, a khutor in Stanovskoy Selsoviet of Timsky District

== Leningrad Oblast ==
As of 2012, four inhabited localities in Leningrad Oblast bear this name:

Urban localities

- Otradnoye, Kirovsky District, Leningrad Oblast, a town under the administrative jurisdiction of Otradnenskoye Settlement Municipal Formation in Kirovsky District; 59°47′N 30°49′E

Rural localities

- Otradnoye, Priozersky District, Leningrad Oblast, a settlement at the railway station in Plodovskoye Settlement Municipal Formation of Priozersky District; 60°50′N 30°8′E
- Otradnoye, Slantsevsky District, Leningrad Oblast, a village in Zagrivskoye Settlement Municipal Formation of Slantsevsky District; 59°8′N 27°50′E
- Otradnoye, Vyborgsky District, Leningrad Oblast, a settlement in Seleznevskoye Settlement Municipal Formation of Vyborgsky District; 60°43′N 28°39′E

== Republic of Mordovia ==
As of 2012, one rural locality in the Republic of Mordovia bears this name:

- Otradnoye, Republic of Mordovia, a selo in Otradnensky Selsoviet of Chamzinsky District; 54°26′N 45°40′E

== Moscow Oblast ==
As of 2012, one rural locality in Moscow Oblast bears this name:

- Otradnoye, Moscow Oblast, a settlement in Otradnenskoye Rural Settlement of Krasnogorsky District; 55°41′N 37°15′E

== Oryol Oblast ==
As of 2012, one rural locality in Oryol Oblast bears this name:

- Otradny, Oryol Oblast, a settlement in Zdorovetsky Selsoviet of Livensky District; 52°30′N 37°24′E

== Penza Oblast ==
As of 2012, one rural locality in Penza Oblast bears this name:

- Otradny, Penza Oblast, a settlement in Uspensky Selsoviet of Mokshansky District

== Primorsky Krai ==
As of 2012, one rural locality in Primorsky Krai bears this name:

- Otradnoye, Primorsky Krai, a selo in Mikhaylovsky District

== Pskov Oblast ==
As of 2012, one rural locality in Pskov Oblast bears this name:

- Otradnoye, Pskov Oblast, a village in Novosokolnichesky District

== Rostov Oblast ==
As of 2012, two rural localities in Rostov Oblast bear this name:

- Otradny, Rostov Oblast, a settlement in Krasnenskoye Rural Settlement of Bagayevsky District; 47°18′N 40°28′E
- Otradnoye, Rostov Oblast, a selo in Bolsheneklinovskoye Rural Settlement of Neklinovsky District; 47°24′N 38°45′E

== Samara Oblast ==
As of 2012, one urban locality in Samara Oblast bears this name:

- Otradny, Samara Oblast, a town, administratively incorporated as a town of oblast significance

== Saratov Oblast ==
As of 2012, one rural locality in Saratov Oblast bears this name:

- Otradnoye, Saratov Oblast, a settlement in Rtishchevsky District

== Stavropol Krai ==
As of 2012, one rural locality in Stavropol Krai bears this name:

- Otradny, Stavropol Krai, a settlement in Ovoshchinsky Selsoviet of Turkmensky District

== Sverdlovsk Oblast ==
As of 2012, one rural locality in Sverdlovsk Oblast bears this name:

- Otradny, Sverdlovsk Oblast, a settlement in Nikolo-Pavlovsky Selsoviet of Prigorodny District

== Tomsk Oblast ==
As of 2012, one rural locality in Tomsk Oblast bears this name:

- Otradny, Tomsk Oblast, a settlement in Asinovsky District

== Tver Oblast ==
As of 2012, two rural localities in Tver Oblast bear this name:

- Otradnoye, Oleninsky District, Tver Oblast, a village in Molodotudskoye Rural Settlement of Oleninsky District
- Otradnoye, Torzhoksky District, Tver Oblast, a village in Sukromlenskoye Rural Settlement of Torzhoksky District

== Volgograd Oblast ==
As of 2012, one rural locality in Volgograd Oblast bears this name:

- Otradnoye, Volgograd Oblast, a settlement in Otradnensky Selsoviet of Mikhaylovsky District

== Vologda Oblast ==
As of 2012, two rural localities in Vologda Oblast bear this name:

- Otradnoye, Vologodsky District, Vologda Oblast, a village in Leskovsky Selsoviet of Vologodsky District
- Otradnoye, Vozhegodsky District, Vologda Oblast, a selo in Maryinsky Selsoviet of Vozhegodsky District

== Voronezh Oblast ==
As of 2012, two rural localities in Voronezh Oblast bear this name:

- Otradnoye, Buturlinovsky District, Voronezh Oblast, a selo under the administrative jurisdiction of Buturlinovskoye Urban Settlement in Buturlinovsky District
- Otradnoye, Novousmansky District, Voronezh Oblast, a settlement in Otradnenskoye Rural Settlement of Novousmansky District

== Yaroslavl Oblast ==
As of 2012, two rural localities in Yaroslavl Oblast bear this name:

- Otradny, Lyubimsky District, Yaroslavl Oblast, a settlement in Lyubimsky Rural Okrug of Lyubimsky District
- Otradny, Uglichsky District, Yaroslavl Oblast, a settlement in Otradnovsky Rural Okrug of Uglichsky District
