= Otradny =

Otradny (masculine), Otradnaya (feminine), or Otradnoye (neuter) may refer to:

- Otradnoye District, a district in North-Eastern Administrative Okrug of the federal city of Moscow, Russia
- Otradny, Russia (Otradnaya, Otradnoye), several inhabited localities in Russia
- Otradnoye (Moscow Metro), a station on Serpukhovsko-Timiryazevskaya Line of Moscow Metro, Moscow, Russia
- Otradnoye, former name of Qazanbatan, a village in Azerbaijan

== See also ==
- Otradnensky (disambiguation)
- Vidradne (disambiguation)
