= Semyonovo-Krasilovo =

Semyonovo-Krasilovo Семёно-Красилово
- Selo
- Location within Altai Krai Location within Russia
- Coordinates: 53°33′N 85°36′E
- Country: Russia
- Region: Altai Krai
- District: Kytmanovsky District
- Time zone: UTC+7:00

Semyonovo-Krasilovo (Russian: Семёно-Красилово) is a rural locality (a selo) and the administrative center of Semyonovo-Krasilovsky Selsoviet, Kytmanovsky District, Altai Krai, Russia. The population was 493 as of 2013. There are 10 streets.

== Geography ==
Semyonovo-Krasilovo is located 18 km northeast of Kytmanovo (the district's administrative centre) by road. Novokhmelyovka and Tyakhta are the nearest rural localities.
