= Novokytmanovo =

Novokytmanovo Новокытманово
- Selo
- Location within Altai Krai Location within Russia
- Coordinates: 53°20′N 85°05′E
- Country: Russia
- Region: Altai Krai
- District: Kytmanovsky District
- Time zone: UTC+7:00

Novokytmanovo (Russian: Новокытманово) is a rural locality (a selo) in Novotarabinsky Selsoviet, Kytmanovsky District, Altai Krai, Russia. The population was 56 as of 2013. There are 2 streets.

== Geography ==
Novokytmanovo is located on the Taraba River, 32 km southwest of Kytmanovo (the district's administrative centre) by road. Losikha is the nearest rural locality.
