= Novoozyornoye =

Rural locality in Altai Krai, Russia

Novoozyornoye Новоозёрное
- Selo
- Location within Altai Krai Location within Russia
- Coordinates: 53°28′N 85°37′E
- Country: Russia
- Region: Altai Krai
- District: Kytmanovsky District
- Time zone: UTC+7:00

Novoozyornoye (Russian: Новоозёрное) is a rural locality (a selo) in Tyagunsky Selsoviet, Kytmanovsky District, Altai Krai, Russia. The population was 184 as of 2013. There are 4 streets.

== Geography ==
Novoozyornoye is located 13 km east of Kytmanovo (the district's administrative centre) by road. Novoduplinka is the nearest rural locality.
