= Uskovo =

Uskovo Усково
- Selo
- Location within Altai Krai Location within Russia
- Coordinates: 53°42′N 85°36′E
- Country: Russia
- Region: Altai Krai
- District: Kytmanovsky District
- Time zone: UTC+7:00

Uskovo (Russian: Усково) is a rural locality (a selo) in Kytmanovsky District, Altai Krai, Russia. The population was 56 as of 2013. There is 1 street.

== Geography ==
Uskovo is located 41 km north of Kytmanovo (the district's administrative centre) by road. Otradnoye is the nearest rural locality.
