= Poroshino =

Poroshino (Russian: Порошино) is the name of several rural localities in Russia:

- Poroshino, Altai Krai, a selo in Poroshinsky Selsoviet of Kytmanovsky District in Altai Krai; 53°14′N 85°09′E
- Poroshino, Bryansk Oblast, a settlement in Ormensky Rural Administrative Okrug of Vygonichsky District in Bryansk Oblast; 53°08′N 33°57′E
- Poroshino, Ivanovo Oblast, a village in Pestyakovsky District of Ivanovo Oblast; 56°37′N 42°36′E
- Poroshino, Kirov, Kirov Oblast, a selo under the administrative jurisdiction of Pervomaysky City District of the City of Kirov in Kirov Oblast; 58°36′N 49°50′E
- Poroshino, Afanasyevsky District, Kirov Oblast, a village in Pashinsky Rural Okrug of Afanasyevsky District in Kirov Oblast; 58°44′N 53°23′E
- Poroshino, Penza Oblast, a selo in Titovsky Selsoviet of Pachelmsky District in Penza Oblast
- Poroshino, Pskov Oblast, a village in Palkinsky District of Pskov Oblast
- Poroshino, Ryazan Oblast, a village in Oskinsky Rural Okrug of Klepikovsky District in Ryazan Oblast
- Poroshino, Udmurt Republic, a village in Karsovaysky Selsoviet of Balezinsky District in the Udmurt Republic
- Poroshino, Babayevsky District, Vologda Oblast, a village in Borisovsky Selsoviet of Babayevsky District in Vologda Oblast
- Poroshino, Vologodsky District, Vologda Oblast, a village in Markovsky Selsoviet of Vologodsky District in Vologda Oblast
- Poroshino, Yaroslavl Oblast, a village in Bekrenevsky Rural Okrug of Yaroslavsky District in Yaroslavl Oblast
