= Dmitro-Titovo =

Dmitro-Titovo Дмитро-Титово
- Selo
- Location within Altai Krai Location within Russia
- Coordinates: 53°35′N 85°14′E
- Country: Russia
- Region: Altai Krai
- District: Kytmanovsky District
- Time zone: UTC+7:00

Dmitro-Titovo (Russian: Дмитро-Титово) is a rural locality (a selo) and the administrative center of Dmitro-Titovsky Selsoviet, Kytmanovsky District, Altai Krai, Russia. The population was 1,028 as of 2013. There are 13 streets.

== Geography ==
Dmitro-Titovo is located on the Chumysh River, 31 km northwest of Kytmanovo (the district's administrative centre) by road. Larionovo is the nearest rural locality.
