= Kokcha-3 =

Bronze Age burial mounds in Uzbekistan

Kokcha-3 kurgans are a group of Bronze Age kurgans located 5 km south of Mount Kokcha in the Tórtkúl District of Karakalpakistan in Uzbekistan. They are located in the area of ancient Khorezm, and represent a burial ground of the Tazabagyab culture (13th–11th centuries BC). It is the largest cemetery of this archaeological culture excavated until now.

Currently, this burial ground is located around 250 km south of Aral Sea but, during the Bronze Age, it was close to where the ancient Amu Darya river used to fall into the Aral Sea.

Shortugai in Afghanistan, a trading colony of the Indus Valley Civilisation, was located close to Kokcha river, but this river is a tributary of Amu Darya. There's no direct connection between the site of Kokcha-3 and Kokcha river, whose mouth is far upstream of Amu Darya at the site of Ai-Khanoum in Afghanistan on the Tajikistan border.

Kokcha-3 site was located between the northern steppe-based pastoralists, and the southern oasis agricultural civilization of Central Asia (Bactria–Margiana Archaeological Complex).

== History ==
H. Parzinger and M. Teufer presented a two-phase chronological model for Kokcha-3 based on the analysis of grave goods. According to them,

"... the older phase of Kokcha 3 was contemporaneous with other Andronovo-Srubnaya sites in southern Siberia, while the younger phase falls into the transitional phase to the Final Bronze Age".

While the ceramic ornamentation and jewellery of the first Phase A shows strong affinities to the Andronovo and Srubnaya steppe cultures, the second phase (Phase B) is characterized by open vessel forms and tool types showing a transition toward the later Amirabad culture (c. 1000 BCE).

Phase A graves frequently contain bronze bracelets and temple rings. On the other hand, later during Phase B, jewelry is largely absent from graves, so the grave goods shift more to different tool types.

== Kurgans ==
The kurgans were discovered and studied by the Khorezm archaeological and ethnographic expedition led by Sergey Tolstov in 1954–59. It consists of more than 100 burials of the deceased, 74 of which were excavated. Some graves contained one and some contained two bodies of different sexes. Men were laid on the right side, and women on the left. There were 1 or 2 vessels placed above the heads of the bodies.

Bronze bracelets and earrings, and bronze and agate beads were found in the graves of women, and bronze four-edged swords with bone handles, bronze knives, and various weapons were found in the graves of men.

According to research, the Kokcha people were mainly engaged in animal husbandry, and partly in farming along the riverbeds. They had close economic and cultural ties with the tribes of the Yogochband culture (Timber-grave culture), as well as the Andronovo-type culture living on the banks of the Volga.

== DNA studies ==
The DNA sample I12499 (Kokcha 3, 1497—1318 BC) was found to contain Haplogroup R1a.

== See also ==
- Vakhsh culture
- Bishkent culture
- Amyrgians

== Bibliography ==
- Finn Schreiber 2022, Social and chronological aspects of the Late Bronze age burial site of Kokcha 3 (Uzbekistan). Journal of Archaeological Science: Reports. August 2022. Article: 103508, Volume 44 - sciencedirect.com
- Itina MA 1969, Excavations of the burial ground of the Tazabagyab culture Kokcha-3 / MHE, M, 1969, Issue-5, pp. 41-74
- Matnazarova Gulnoz Bakhtiyorovna 2021, History of Khorezmian jewelry (from the earliest times to the viii century AD). in CENTRAL ASIAN JOURNAL OF SOCIAL SCIENCES AND HISTORY VOLUME: 02 ISSUE: 02 | FEB 2021 (ISSN: 2660-6836)
