= Poroshino, Altai Krai =

Poroshino Порошино
- Village
- Location within Altai Krai Location within Russia
- Coordinates: 53°13′N 85°08′E
- Country: Russia
- Region: Altai Krai
- District: Kytmanovsky District
- Time zone: UTC+7:00

Poroshino (Russian: Порошино) is a rural locality (a selo) and the administrative center of Poroshenskoye Rural Settlement of Kytmanovsky District, Altai Krai, Russia. The population was 454 as of 2016. There are 6 streets.

== Geography ==
Poroshino is located 42 km southwest of Kytmanovo (the district's administrative centre) by road. Cherkasovo is the nearest rural locality.
