= Otradnoye, Altai Krai =

Otradnoye Отрадное
- Selo
- Location within Altai Krai Location within Russia
- Coordinates: 53°41′N 85°39′E
- Country: Russia
- Region: Altai Krai
- District: Kytmanovsky District
- Time zone: UTC+7:00

Otradnoye (Russian: Отрадное) is a rural locality (a selo) in Kytmanovsky District, Altai Krai, Russia. The population was 215 as of 2013. There are 5 streets.

== Geography ==
Otradnoye is located 37 km north of Kytmanovo (the district's administrative centre) by road. Uskovo is the nearest rural locality.
