= Andronovo culture =

Bronze Age cultures, 2000–900 BC

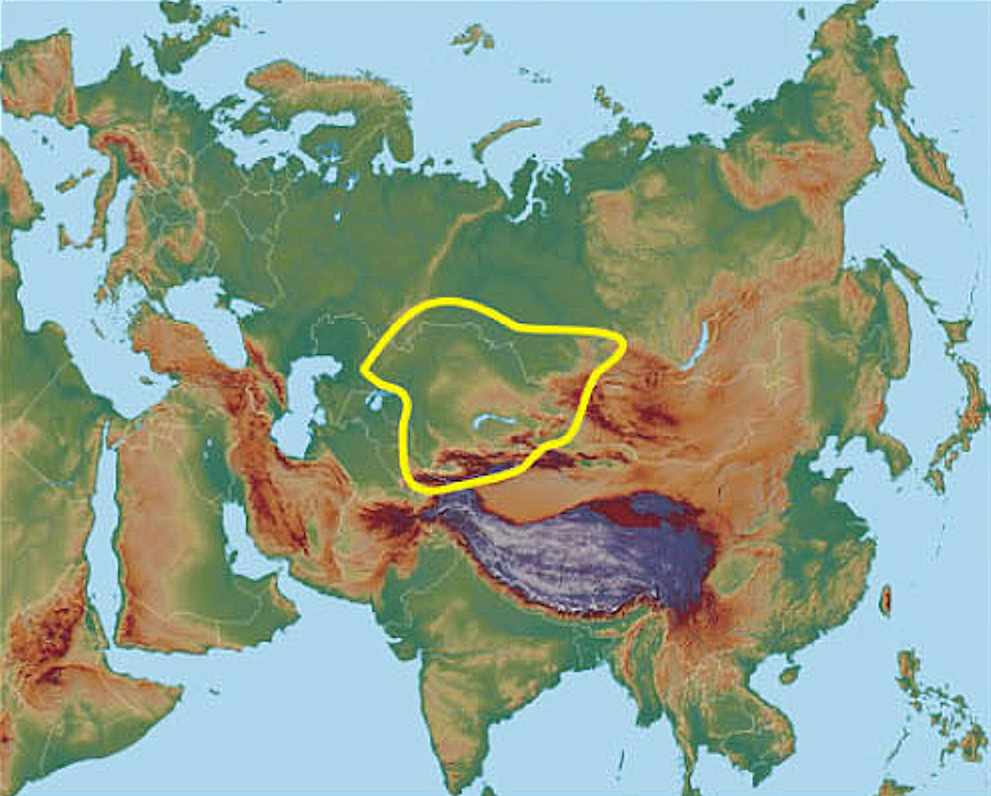
- Geographical range: Eurasian steppe
- Period: Late Bronze Age
- Dates: c. 2000 BC – 1150 BC
- Preceded by: Sintashta culture, Okunev culture, Seima-Turbino phenomenon, Kelteminar culture
- Followed by: Karasuk culture, Begazy–Dandybai culture, Tazabagyab culture, Saka

The Andronovo culture (Note: Russian: Андроновская культура, romanised: Andrónovskaya kultúra, pronounced [ɐnˈdronəfskəjə kʊlʲˈturə]) is a collection of similar local Late Bronze Age cultures that flourished c. 2000–1150 BC, spanning from the southern Urals to the upper Yenisei River in central Siberia and western Xinjiang in the east. In the south, the Andronovo sites reached Tajikistan and Uzbekistan. It is agreed among scholars that the Andronovo culture was Indo-Iranian. Some researchers have preferred to term it an archaeological complex or archaeological horizon.

Andronovo culture's first stage may have started as early as the waning years of the 3rd millennium BC, with a focus on cattle grazing in the vast grasslands of the region. The slightly older Sintashta culture (c. 2200–1900 BC), formerly included within the Andronovo culture, is now thought to be distinct from Early Andronovo cultures. Allentoft et al. (2015) concluded from their genetic studies that the Andronovo culture and the preceding Sintashta culture were derived from an eastern migration of the Corded Ware culture, given the higher proportion of ancestry matching the earlier farmers of Europe, similar to the admixture found in the genomes of the Corded Ware population.

== Discovery ==
The name derives from the village of Andronovo in the Uzhursky District of Krasnoyarsk Krai, Siberia, where the Russian zoologist Arkadi Tugarinov discovered its first remains in 1914. Several graves were discovered, with skeletons in crouched positions, buried with richly decorated pottery. The Andronovo culture was first identified by the Russian archaeologist Sergei Teploukhov in the 1920s.

== Dating and subcultures ==
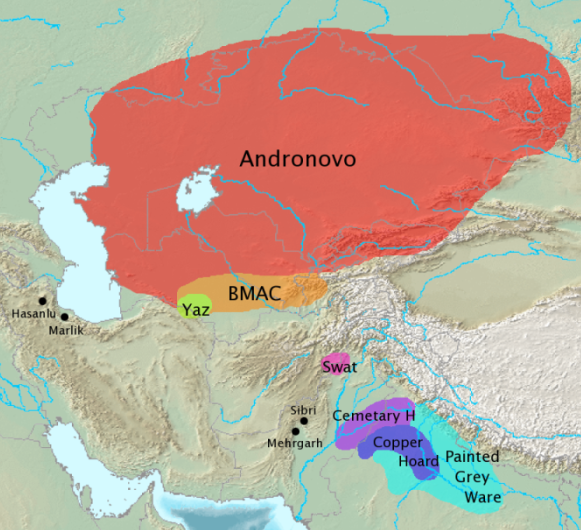
Archaeological cultures associated with Indo-Iranian migrations (after EIEC): The Andronovo, BMAC and Yaz cultures have often been associated with Indo-Iranian migrations. The Gandhara grave (or Swat), Cemetery H, Copper Hoard and Painted Grey Ware cultures are candidates for the Indo-Aryan migration into South Asia.

The culture of Sarazm (4th–3rd millennium BC) precedes the arrival of the Andronovo steppe culture in South Central Asia in the 2nd millennium BC.

Currently only two sub-cultures are considered as part of Andronovo culture:

- Alakul (1900–1500 BC) In the Forest steppe and steppe of the Trans-Urals; northern, western, and central Kazakhstan; western Siberia; reaching southern Central Asia. In Transoxiana region, and Kyzylkum Desert.
- Fëdorovo or Fyodorovka (1900–1300 BC) At Forest steppe in Trans-Urals and Ingala Valley; Southern Siberia and Upper Yenissei; northern, central, and eastern Kazakhstan; Semirech'ye region; the Pamir and Tian Shan Mountains; and Xinjiang. In southern Siberia (earliest evidence of cremation and fire cult)
- Alakul-Fëdorovo (1750–1550 BC). On the other hand, synchronous Alakul-Fedorovo sites mainly appeared in the second quarter of the second millennium BC, in Southern Urals, along with the persistence of the Alakul materials.

Other authors identify the following sub-culture also as part of Andronovo:

- Alekseyevka-Sargary (1500–1000 BC) Late Bronze Age in northern Kazakhstan, contacts with Namazga VI in Turkmenia, Ingala Valley in the south of Tyumen Oblast, in Tobol.

Some authors have challenged the chronology and model of eastward spread due to increasing evidence for the earlier presence of these cultural features in parts of east Central Asia.

== Geographic extent ==
The geographical extent of the culture is vast and difficult to delineate exactly. On its western fringes, it overlaps with the approximately contemporaneous, but distinct, Srubna culture in the Volga-Ural interfluvial. To the east, it reaches into the Minusinsk depression, with some sites as far west as the southern Ural Mountains, overlapping with the area of the earlier Afanasevo culture. Additional sites are scattered as far south as the Kopet Dag (Turkmenistan), the Pamir (Tajikistan) and the Tian Shan (Kyrgyzstan). The northern boundary vaguely corresponds to the beginning of the Taiga. More recently, evidence for the presence of the culture in Xinjiang in far-western China has also been found, mainly concentrated in the area comprising Tashkurgan, Ili, Bortala, and Tacheng area. In the Volga basin, interaction with the Srubna culture was the most intense and prolonged, and Federovo style pottery is found as far west as Volgograd. Mallory notes that the Tazabagyab culture south of Andronovo could be an offshoot of the former (or Srubna), alternatively the result of an amalgamation of steppe cultures and the Central Asian oasis cultures (Bishkent culture and Vakhsh culture). Andronovo influence is thought to have reached as far as the Shang dynasty in China, including the introduction of chariots likely via the Karasuk variant of Andronovo and possibly other intermediary cultures.

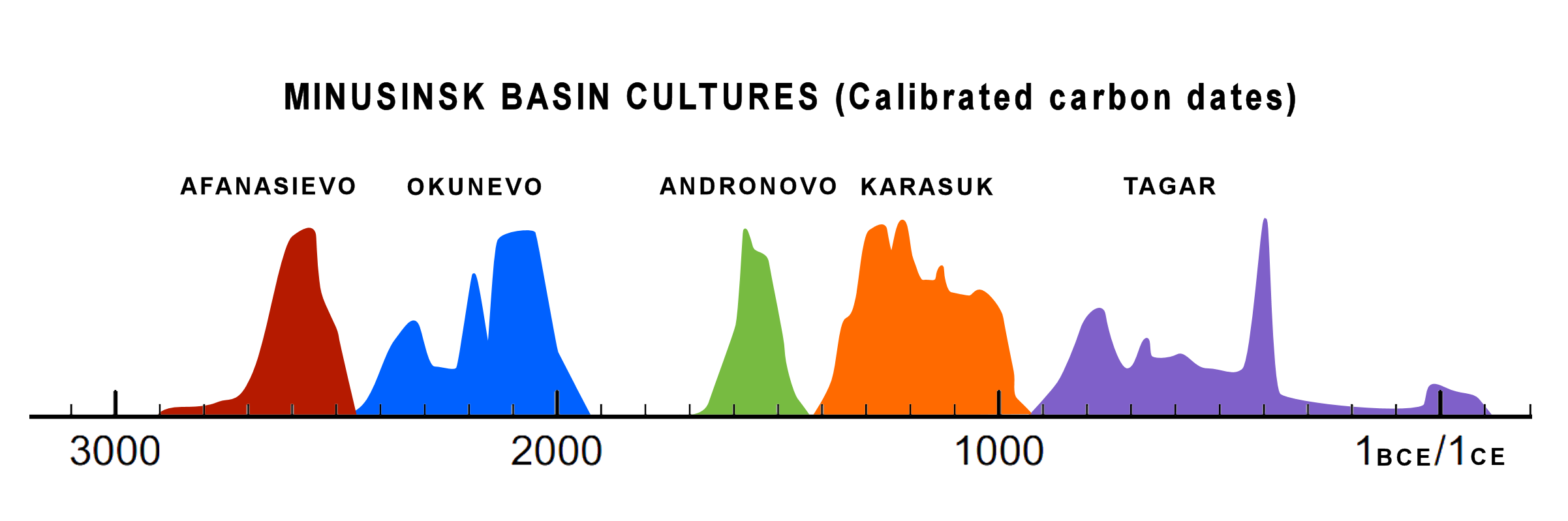
Dates of Minusinsk Basin cultures, at the easternmost edge of Adronovo culture (Summed probability distribution for new human bone dates, Afanasievo to Tagar cultures)

In the initial Sintashta-Petrovka phase, the Andronovo culture is limited to the northern and western steppes in the southern Urals-Kazakhstan. Since then, at the 2nd millennium, in the Alakul Phase (2000–1700 BC), the Fedorovo Phase (1850–1450 BC) and the final Alekseyevka Phase (1400–1000 BC), the Andronovo cultures move intensively eastwards, expanding as far east as the Upper Yenisei River, succeeding the non-Indo-European Okunev culture.

In southern Siberia and Kazakhstan, the Andronovo culture was succeeded by the Karasuk culture (1500–800 BC). On its western border, it is roughly contemporaneous with the Srubna culture, which partly derives from the Abashevo culture. The earliest historical peoples associated with the area are the Cimmerians and Saka/Scythians, appearing in Assyrian records after the decline of the Alekseyevka culture, migrating into Ukraine from ca. the 9th century BC (see also Ukrainian stone stela), and across the Caucasus into Anatolia and Assyria in the late 8th century BC, and possibly also west into Europe as the Thracians (see Thraco-Cimmerian), and the Sigynnae, located by Herodotus beyond the Danube, north of the Thracians, and by Strabo near the Caspian Sea. Both Herodotus and Strabo identify them as Iranian.

== Characteristics ==
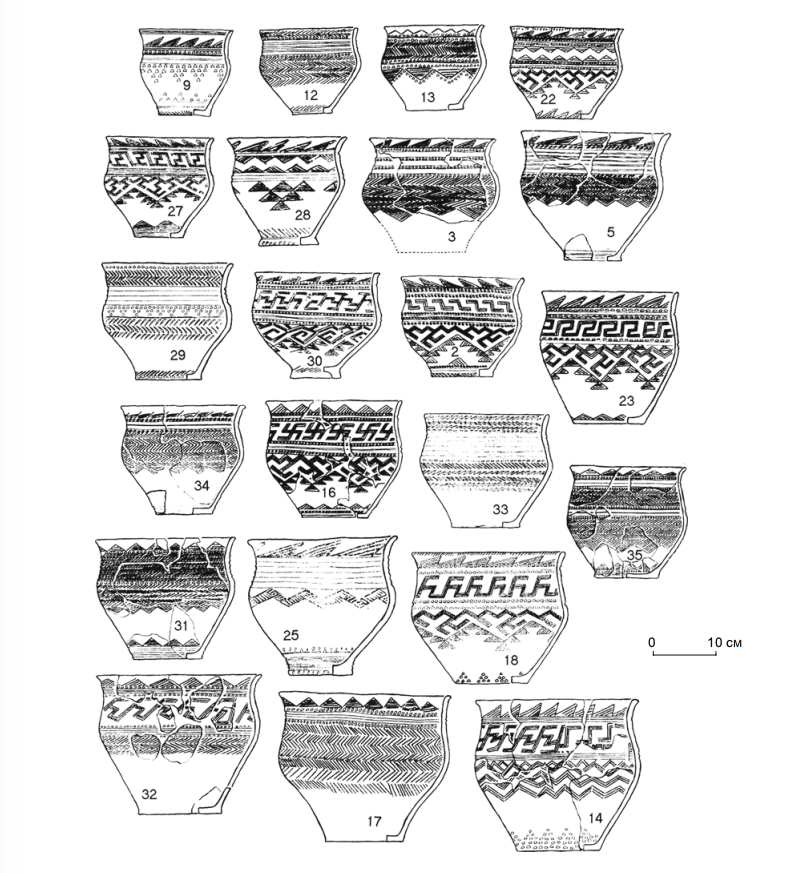
Andronovo ceramics

The Andronovo culture comprised both highly mobile communities and settled villages, with a notable concentration of settlements in its Central Asian regions. Fortifications include ditches, earthen banks as well as timber palisades, of which an estimated twenty have been discovered. Andronovo villages typically contain around two to twenty houses, but settlements containing as many as a hundred houses have been discovered. Andronovo houses were generally constructed from pine, cedar, or birch, and were usually aligned overlooking the banks of rivers. Larger homes range in the size from 80 to 300 m^{2}, and probably belonged to extended families, a typical feature among early Indo-Iranians. Soma may have originated in the Andronovo culture.

=== Livestock, horse, and agriculture ===
Andronovo livestock included cattle, horses, sheep, goats and camels. The domestic pig is notably absent, which is typical of a mobile economy. The percentage of cattle among Andronovo remains are significantly higher than among their western Srubna neighbours. The horse was represented on Andronovo sites and was used for both riding and traction. According to the Journal of Archaeological Science, in July 2020, scientists from South Ural State University studied two Late Bronze Age horses with the aid of radiocarbon dating from Kurgan 5 of the Novoilinovsky 2 cemetery in the Lisakovsk city in the Kostanay region. Researcher Igor Chechushkov, indicated that the Andronovites had an ability on horse riding several centuries earlier than many researchers had previously expected. Among the horses investigated, the stallion was nearly 20 years old and the mare was 18 years old. According to scientists, animals were buried with the person they accompanied throughout their lives, and they were used not only for food, but also for harnessing to vehicles and riding. Agriculture did not play an important role in the Andronovo economy.

=== Metallurgy ===
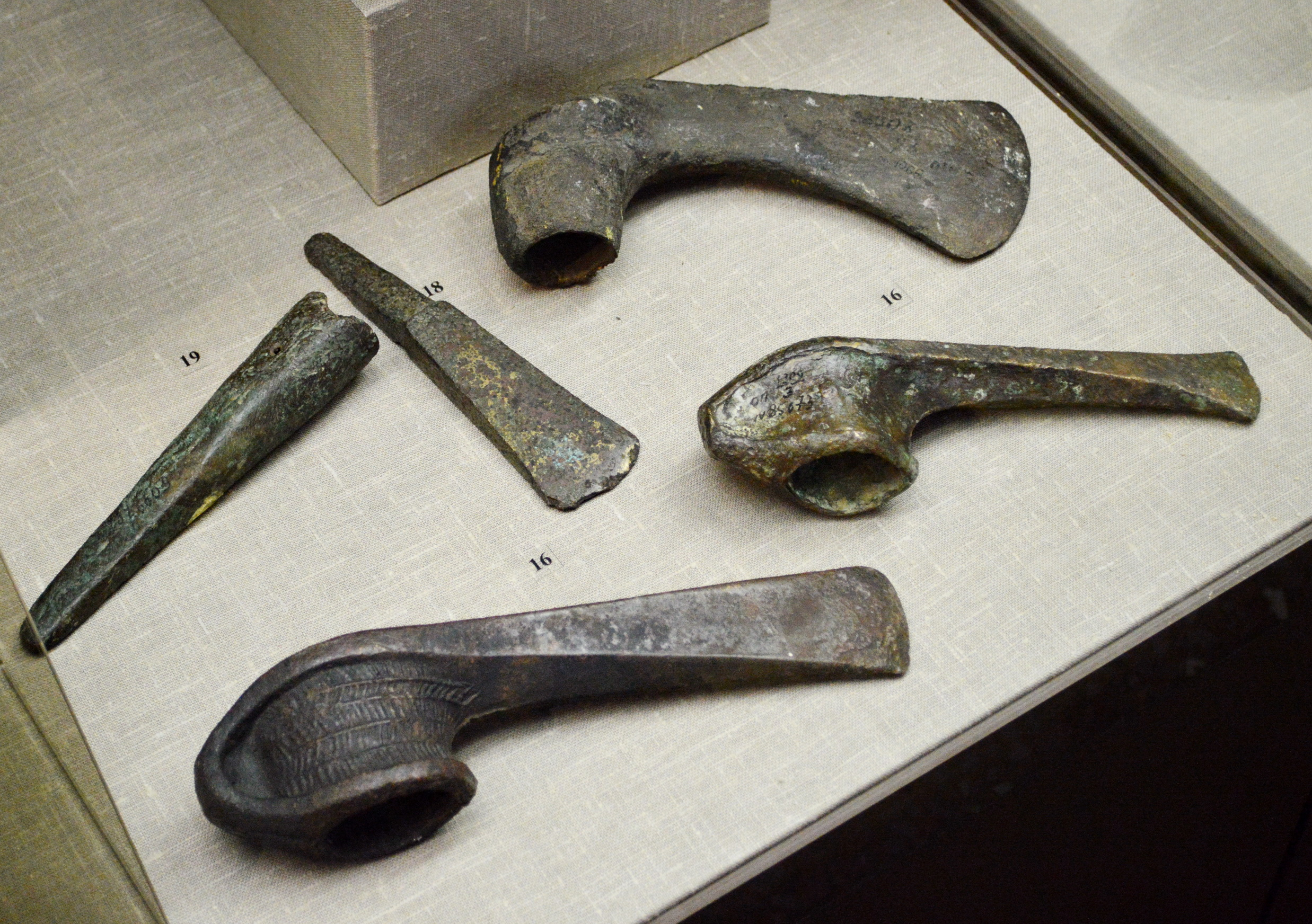
Andronovo bronze axes.

The Andronovo culture is notable for regional advances in metallurgy. They mined deposits of copper ore in the Altai Mountains from around the 14th century BC. Bronze objects were numerous, and workshops existed for working copper.

=== Pottery ===
One of the characteristics of Andronovo culture is its pottery, especially in campsites located in Central Asia, some of them very close to settlements of Bactria–Margiana Archaeological Complex in the south. This pottery is called Incised Coarse Ware (ICW), which is handmade and grey to brown in colour, as well as incised with geometrical decoration, spread over much of Eurasian region, from Southern Urals to Kashgar, a pottery made by late Bronze Age nomads.

=== Warfare ===
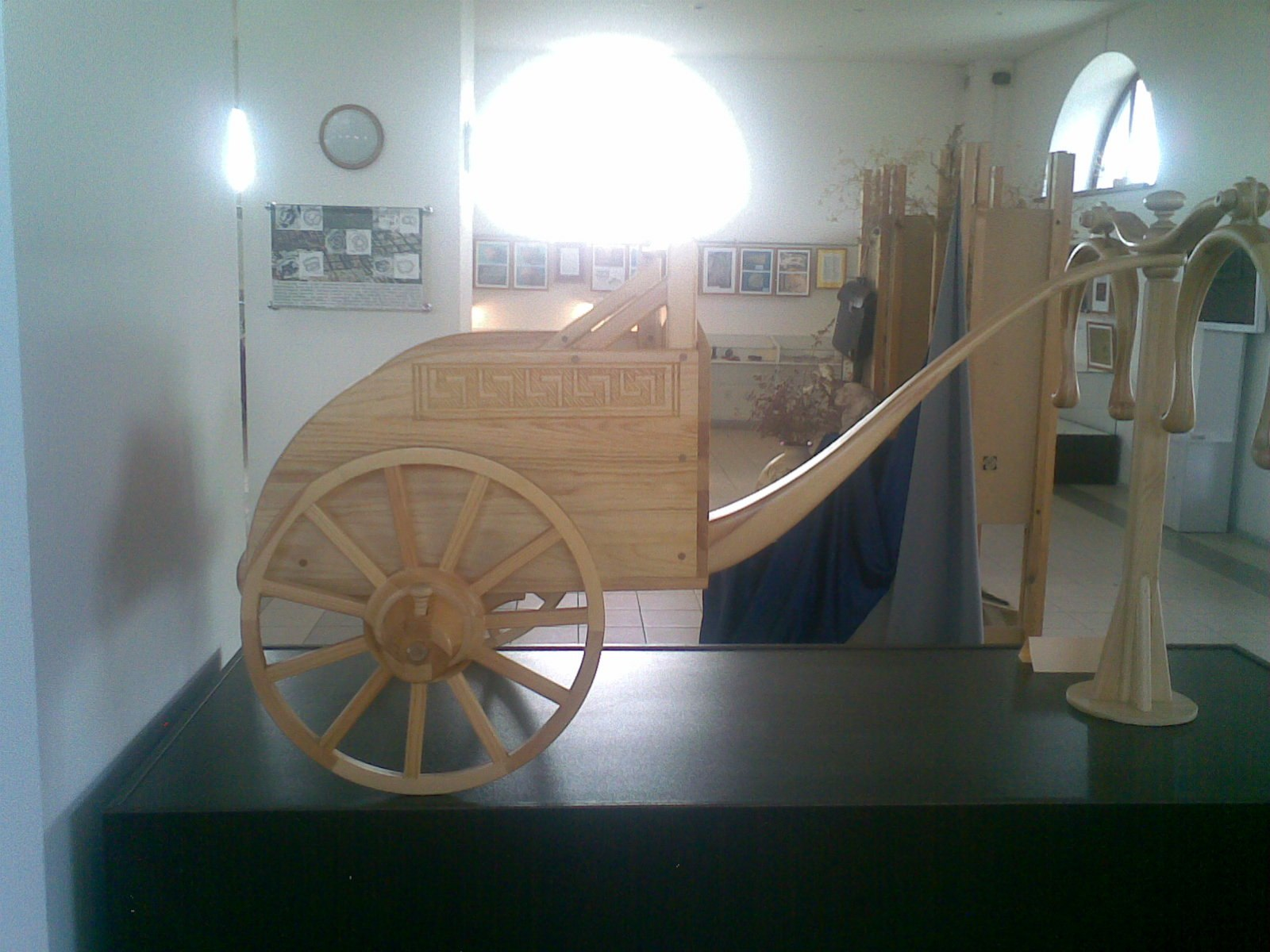
Chariot model, Arkaim museum

"It is likely that militarized elite, whose power was based on the physical control of fellow tribesmen and neighbors with the help of riding and fighting skills, was buried in the Novoilinovsky-2 burial ground. The rider has a significant advantage over the infantryman. There may be another explanation: These elite fulfilled the function of mediating conflicts within the collective, and therefore had power and high social status. Metaphorically, this kind of elite can be called Sheriffs of the Bronze Age" said Igor Chechushkov.

=== Burials ===
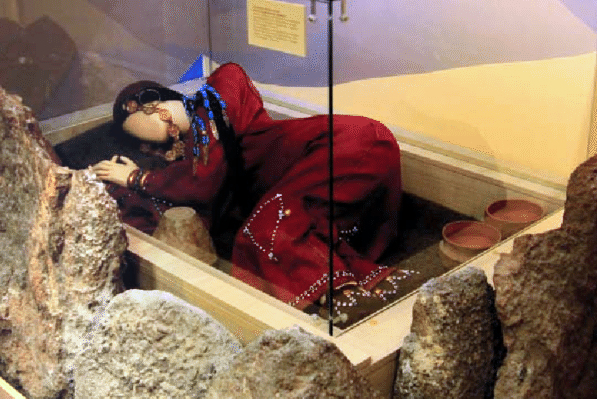
Reconstruction of an Andronovo burial. Lisakovsk Museum

The Andronovo dead were buried in timber or stone chambers under both round and rectangular kurgans (tumuli). Burials were accompanied by livestock, wheeled vehicles, cheek-pieces for horses, and weapons, ceramics and ornaments. Among the most notable remains are the burials of chariots, dating from around 2000 BC and possibly earlier. The chariots are found with paired horse-teams, and the ritual burial of the horse in a "head and hooves" cult has also been found. Some Andronovo dead were buried in pairs, of adults or adult and child.

At Kytmanovo in Russia between Mongolia and Kazakhstan, dated 1746–1626 BC, a strain of Yersinia pestis was extracted from a dead woman's tooth in a grave common to her and to two children. This strain's genes express flagellin, which triggers the human immune response. However, by contrast with other prehistoric Yersinia pestis bacteria, the strain does so weakly; later, historic plague does not express flagellin at all, accounting for its virulence. The Kytmanovo strain was therefore under selection toward becoming a plague (although it was not the plague). The three people in that grave all died at the same time, and the researcher believes that this para-plague is what killed them.

== Ethnolinguistic affiliation with Indo-Iranians ==
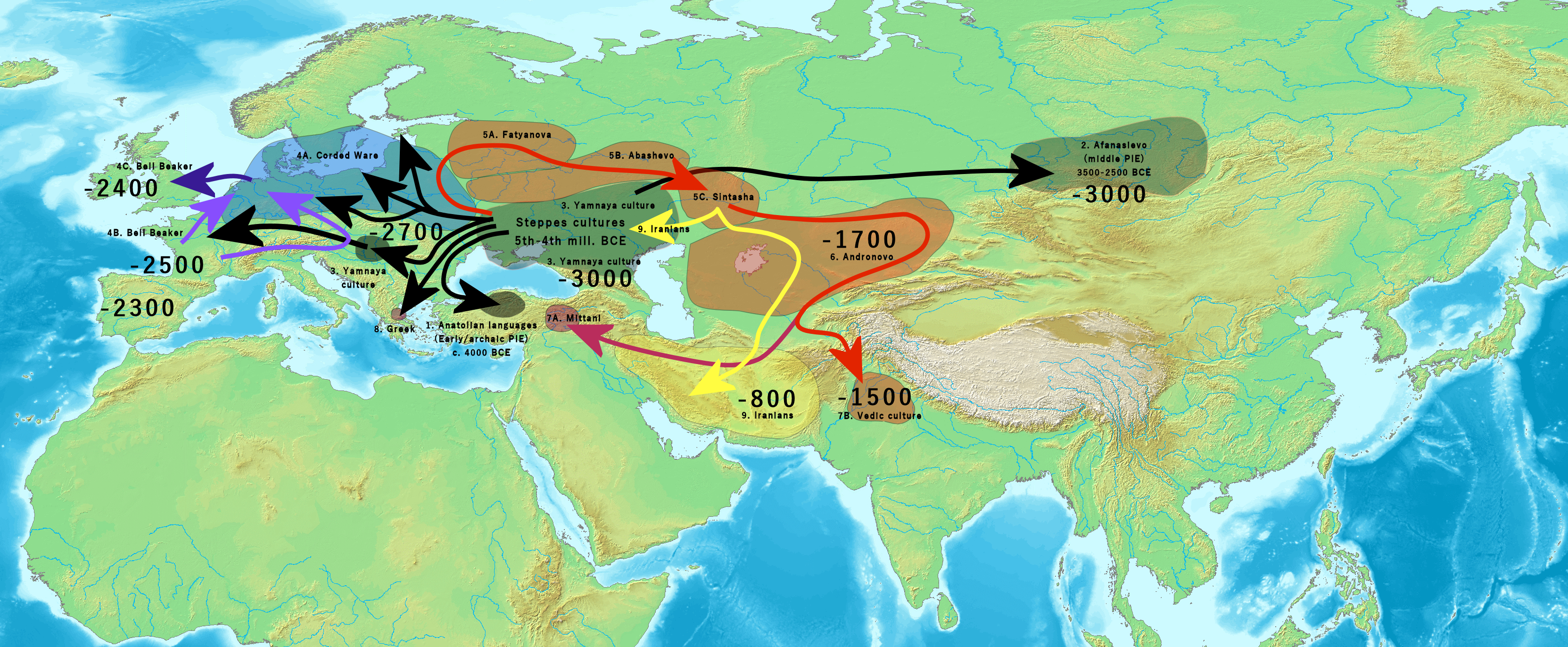
Early Indo-European migrations from the Pontic steppes and across Central Asia.

Most researchers associate the Andronovo horizon with early Indo-Iranian languages. It is credited with the invention of the spoke-wheeled chariot around 2000 BC, if we include the Sintashta culture, where the oldest known chariots have been found. The association between the Andronovo culture and the Indo-Iranians is corroborated by the distribution of Iranian place-names across the Andronovo horizon and by the historical evidence of dominance by various Iranian-speaking peoples, including the Saka (Scythians), Sarmatians and Alans, throughout the Andronovo horizon during the 1st millennium BC.

The Sintashta site on the upper Ural River, noted for its chariot burials and kurgans containing horse burials, is considered the type site of the Sintashta culture, forming one of the earliest parts of the "Andronovo horizon". It is conjectured that the language spoken was still in the Proto-Indo-Iranian stage.

Comparisons between the archaeological evidence of the Andronovo and textual evidence of Indo-Iranians (i. e. the Vedas and the Avesta) are frequently made to support the Indo-Iranian identity of the Andronovo. The modern explanations for the Indo-Iranianization of the Iranian plateau and the Indian subcontinent rely heavily on the supposition that the Andronovo expanded southwards into Central Asia or at least achieved linguistic dominance across the Bronze Age urban centres of the region, such as the Bactria–Margiana Archaeological Complex. While the earlier phases of the Andronovo culture are regarded as co-ordinate with the late period of Indo-Iranian linguistic unity, it is likely that in the later period they constituted a branch of the Iranians. According to Narasimhan et al. (2019), the expansion of the Andronovo culture towards the BMAC took place via the Inner Asia Mountain Corridor.

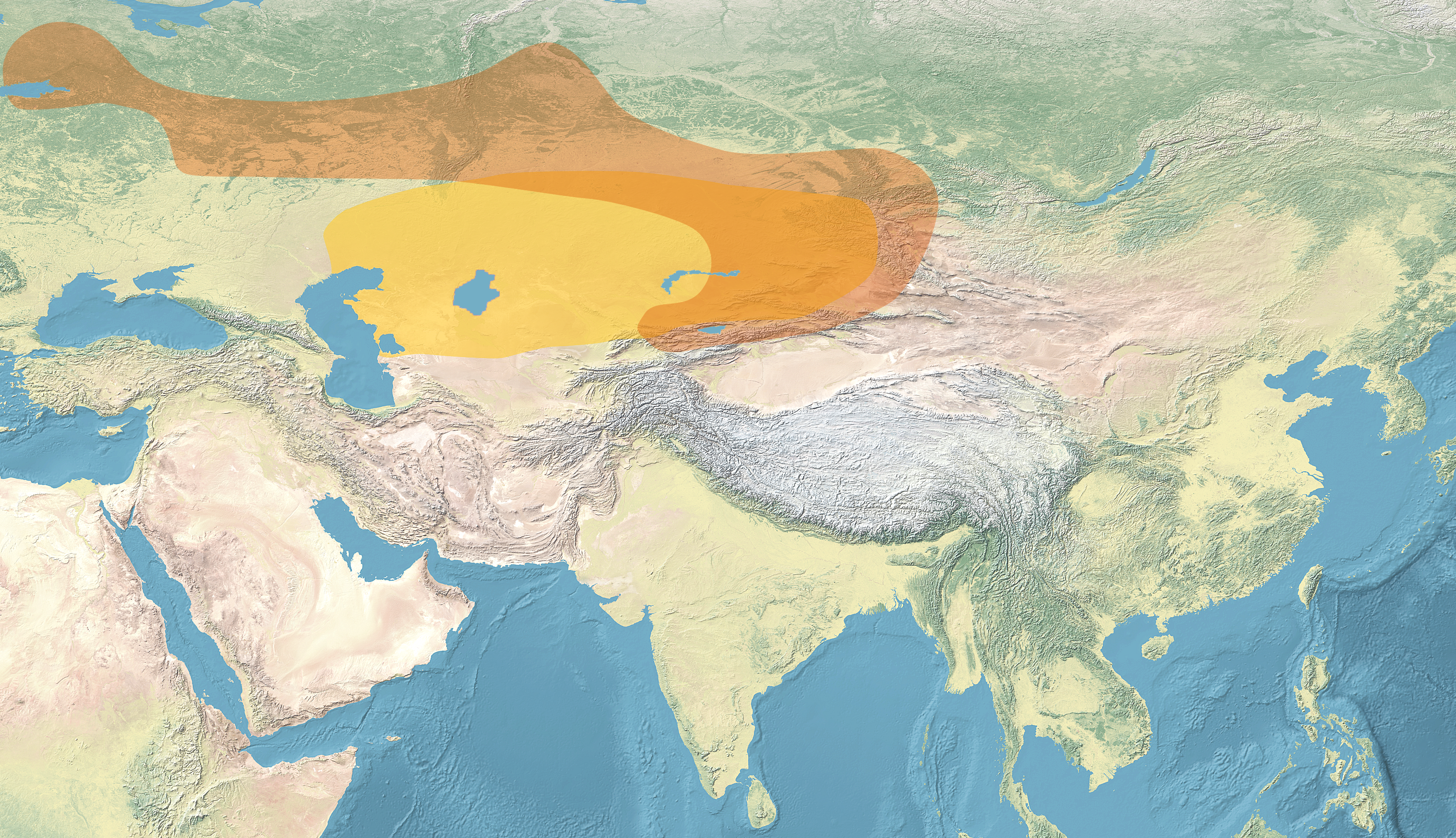
Andronovo culture ( ), Seima-Turbino culture ( ), and other contemporary cultures and polities circa 2000 BC.

According to Hiebert, an expansion of the BMAC into Iran and the margin of the Indus Valley is "the best candidate for an archaeological correlate of the introduction of Indo-Iranian speakers to Iran and South Asia", despite the absence of the characteristic timber graves of the steppe in the Near East, or south of the region between Kopet Dag and Pamir-Karakorum. (Note: Sarianidi states that "direct archaeological data from Bactria and Margiana show without any shade of doubt that Andronovo tribes penetrated to a minimum extent into Bactria and Margianian oases".) Mallory acknowledges the difficulties of making a case for expansions from Andronovo to northern South Asia, and that attempts to link the Indo-Aryans to such sites as the Beshkent and Vakhsh cultures "only gets the Indo-Iranian to Central Asia, but not as far as the seats of the Medes, Persians or Indo-Aryans". He has developed the Kulturkugel model that has the Indo-Iranians taking over Bactria-Margiana cultural traits but preserving their language and religion while moving into Iran and India.

Based on its use by Indo-Aryans in Mitanni and Vedic India, its prior absence in the Near East and Harappan India, and its 17th–16th century BC attestation at the Andronovo site of Sintashta, Kuzmina (1994) argues that the chariot corroborates the identification of Andronovo as Indo-Iranian. Klejn (1974) and Brentjes (1981) found the Andronovo culture much too late for an Indo-Iranian identification since chariot-using Aryans appear in Mitanni by the 15th century BC. However, Anthony & Vinogradov (1995) dated a chariot burial at Krivoye Lake to around 2000 BC.

Eugene Helimski has suggested that the Andronovo people spoke a separate branch of Indo-Iranian. He claims that borrowings in the Finno-Ugric languages support this view. Vladimir Napolskikh has proposed that borrowings in Finno-Ugric indicate that the language was specifically of the Indo-Aryan type.

Since older forms of Indo-Iranian words have been taken over in Uralic and Proto-Yeniseian, occupation by some other languages (also lost ones) cannot be ruled out altogether, at least for part of the Andronovo area, i. e., Uralic and Yeniseian.

Rasmus G. Bjørn (2022) describes the linguistic heritage of the Andronovo cultural complex as "Indo-Iranic dialect continuum", with a later split between Iranic and Indic. Early Iranic can be associated with later stages of the Andronovo horizon. Indo-Iranian derived loanwords via the Andronovo cultural complex can be found in both Proto-Uralic and later in Proto-Turkic, suggesting some forms of contact near the Altai Mountains (specifically the Minusinsk basin) and Mongolia respectively. Some loanwords related to horse pastoralism are also found in Old Chinese.

== Physical appearance ==
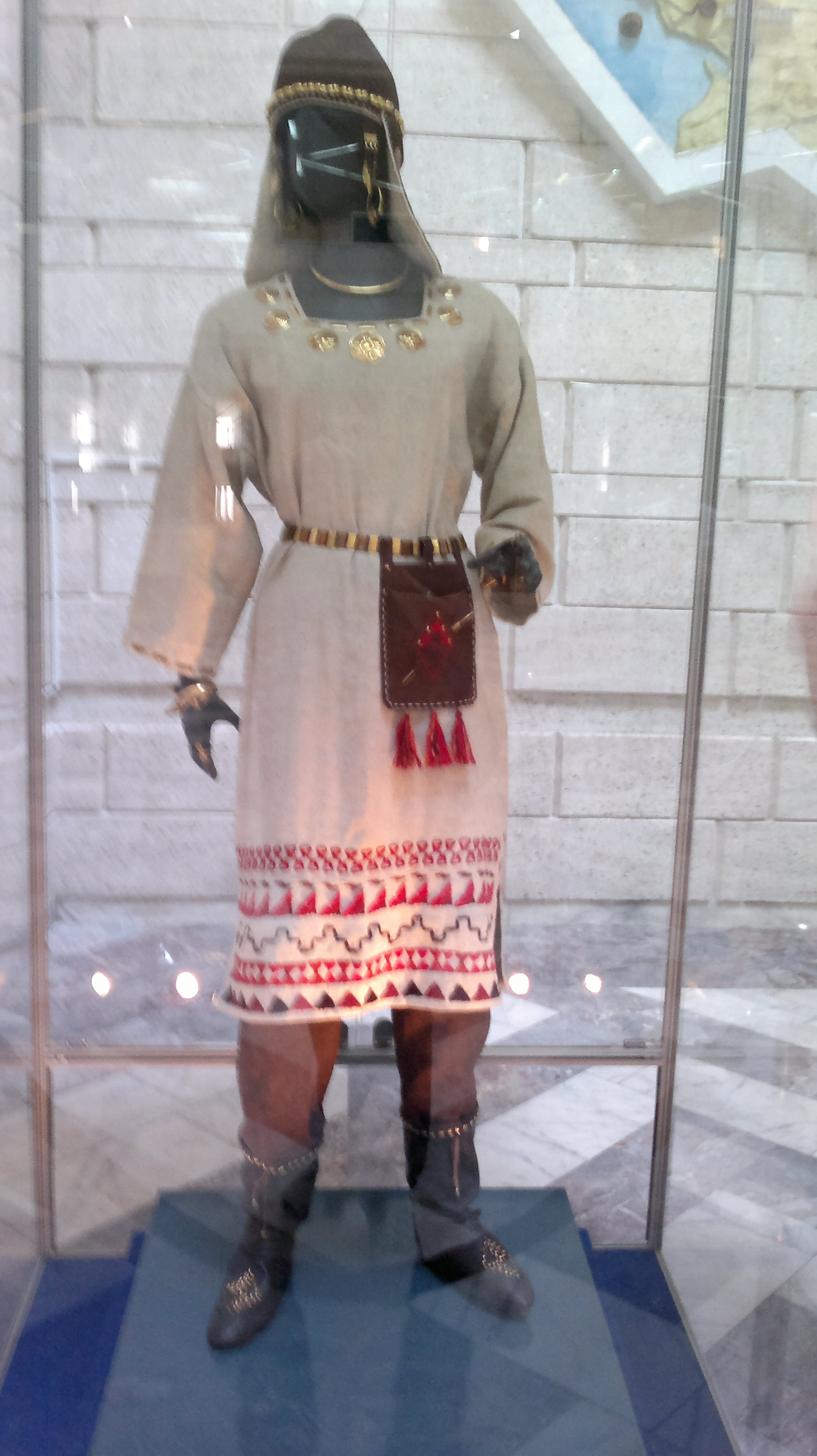
Andronovo culture woman, dress reconstruction, Central State Museum of Kazakhstan

In studies from the mid-2000s, the Andronovo have been described by archaeologists as having cranial features similar to ancient and modern European populations though these cranial features are not exclusive to Europeans. Andronovo skulls are similar to those of the Srubnaya culture and Sintashta culture, exhibiting features such as dolicocephaly. (Note: "[M]assive broad-faced proto-Europoid type is a trait of post-Mariupol' cultures, Sredniy Stog, as well as the Pit-grave culture of the Dnieper's left bank, the Donets, and Don... During the period of the Timber-grave culture the population of the Ukraine was represented by the medium type between the dolichocephalous narrow-faced population of the Multi-roller Ware culture (Babino) and the more massive broad-faced population of the Timber-grave culture of the Volga region... The anthropological data confirm the existence of an impetus from the Volga region to the Ukraine in the formation of the Timber-grave culture. During the Belozerka stage the dolichocranial narrow-faced type became the prevalent one. A close affinity among the skulls of the Timber-grave, Belozerka, and Scythian cultures of the Pontic steppes, on the one hand, and of the same cultures of the forest-steppe region, on the other, has been shown... This proves the genetical continuity between the Iranian-speaking Scythian population and the previous Timber-grave culture population in the Ukraine... The heir of the Neolithic Dnieper-Donets and Sredniy Stog cultures was the Pit-grave culture. Its population possessed distinct Europoid features, was tall, with massive skulls... The tribes of the Abashevo culture appear in the forest-steppe zone, almost simultaneously with the Poltavka culture. The Abashevans are marked by dolichocephaly and narrow faces. This population had its roots in the Balanovo and Fatyanovo cultures on the Middle Volga, and in Central Europe... [T]he early Timber-grave culture (the Potapovka) population was the result of the mixing of different components. One type was massive, and its predecessor was the Pit-grave-Poltavka type. The second type was a dolichocephalous Europoid type genetically related to the Sintashta population... One more participant of the ethno-cultural processes in the steppes was that of the tribes of the Pokrovskiy type. They were dolichocephalous narrow-faced Europoids akin to the Abashevans and different from the Potapovkans... The majority of Timber-grave culture skulls are dolichocranic with middle-broad faces. They evidence the significant role of Pit-grave and Poltavka components in the Timber-grave culture population... One may assume a genetic connection between the populations of the Timber-grave culture of the Urals region and the Alakul' culture of the Urals and West Kazakhstan belonging to a dolichocephalous narrow-face type with the population of the Sintashta culture... [T]he western part of the Andronovo culture population belongs to the dolichocranic type akin to that of the Timber-grave culture.) Through Iranian and Indo-Aryan migrations, this physical type expanded southwards and mixed with aboriginal peoples, contributing to the formation of modern populations of the northern Indian subcontinent. (Note: "The Eurasian steppe nomadic Saka were not immigrants from the Near East but direct descendants of Andronovans, and the mixed character of the Indo-Iranian-speaking populations of Iran and India is the result of a new population spreading among aboriginals with whom a new language is probably to be associated. This conclusion is confirmed by the evidence of Indo-Iranian tradition. The Aryans in the Avesta are tall, light-skinned people with light hair; their women were light-eyed, with long, light tresses... In the Rigveda light skin alongside language is the main feature of the Aryans, differentiating them from the aboriginal Dáśa-Dasyu population who were a dark-skinned, small people speaking another language and who did not believe in the Vedic gods... Skin color was the basis of social division of the Vedic Aryans; their society was divided into social groups varṇa, literally 'color'. The varṇas of Aryan priests (brāhmaṇa) and warriors (kṣatriyaḥ or rājanya) were opposed to the varṇas of the aboriginal Dáśa, called 'black-skinned'...")

A study of 10 Andronovo-related specimens from southern Siberia found that the majority were light haired and light eyed; the authors suggested that such phenotypes were likely common in South Siberia during the Iron Age.

In a study including Andronovo-horizon specimens from Aktogay, Kazakhstan, 60% of the Aktogai individuals had blond hair and the remaining 40% having brown hair. 60% of this sample was brown eyed, while 40% had blue eyes. 80% had intermediate skin, while 20% had pale skin tones. In samples of the later Maitan cultures (also Andronovo-related), 86% had brown hair and 14% had blond hair. There was a significantly higher frequency of brown eyed individuals at 71%, compared to 29% with blue eyes, although the frequency of pale skin was only slightly lower at 14%, with 86% intermediate skinned individuals. In a sample of individuals from the even later Zevakinskiy phase of the Andronovo culture, 100% of individuals had brown eyes, with 80% having brown hair and 20% black hair. 0% of the samples had pale skin, while 20% had dark-to-black skin, with the remaining being intermediated skinned.

== Archaeogenetics ==
The Andronovo culture and its population derived primarily from an eastwards expansion of the Central European Corded Ware culture via the Fatyanovo–Balanovo and Sintashta culture, which are characterised by the combination of mainly Yamnaya-like ancestry and Early European Farmers admixture. The spread of Sintashta-Andronovo ancestry correlates with the expansion of Indo-Iranian-speaking peoples. Andronovo ancestry (c. 57%), in tandem with BMAC admixture (c. 43%), represents the later Iranian dispersal into the Iranian Plateau, while BMAC admixture is not found among the Indo-Aryan migrations into South Asia, suggesting two independent routes, one via the BMAC and one via the Inner Asian mountain corridor.

=== Studies ===
Fox et al. (2004) established that, during the Bronze and Iron Age period, the majority of the population of Kazakhstan (part of the Andronovo culture during Bronze Age) was of West Eurasian origin (with mtDNA haplogroups such as U, H, HV, T, I and W), and that prior to the thirteenth to seventh century BC, all Kazakh samples belonged to European lineages.

Keyser et al. (2009) published a study of the ancient Siberian cultures, the Andronovo culture, the Karasuk culture, the Tagar culture and the Tashtyk culture. Ten individuals of the Andronovo horizon in southern Siberia from 1800 BC to 1400 BC were surveyed. Extractions of mtDNA from nine individuals were determined to represent two samples of haplogroup U4 and single samples of Z1, T1, U2e, T4, H, K2b and U5a1. Extractions of Y-DNA from one individual was determined to belong to Y-DNA haplogroup C (but not C3), while the other two extractions were determined to belong to haplogroup R1a1a, which is thought to mark the eastward migration of the early Indo-Europeans. Of the individuals surveyed, only two (or 22%) were determined to be of Asian ancestry, while seven (or 78%) were determined to be of European ancestry.

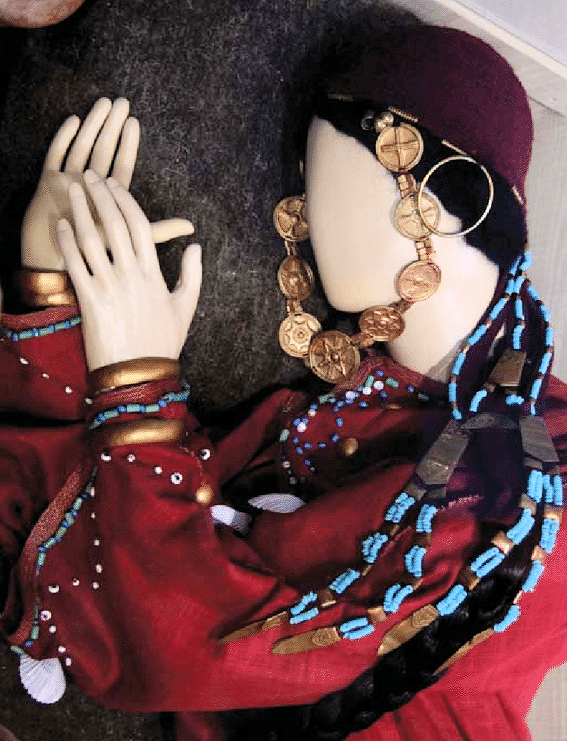
Andronovo costume set (reconstruction). Lisakovsk Museum of History and Culture

In a June 2015 study published in Nature, one male and three female individuals of Andronovo culture were surveyed. Extraction of Y-DNA from the male was determined to belong to R1a1a1b. Extractions of mtDNA were determined to represent two samples of U4 and two samples of U2e. The people of the Andronovo culture were found to be closely genetically related to the preceding Sintashta culture, which was in turn closely genetically related to the Corded Ware culture, suggesting that the Sintashta culture represented an eastward expansion of Corded Ware peoples. The Corded Ware peoples were in turn found to be closely genetically related to the Beaker culture, the Unetice culture and particularly the peoples of the Nordic Bronze Age. Numerous cultural similarities between the Sintashta/Andronovo culture, the Nordic Bronze Age and the peoples of the Rigveda have been detected. (Note: "European Late Neolithic and Bronze Age cultures such as Corded Ware, Bell Beakers, Unetice, and the Scandinavian cultures are genetically very similar to each other... The close affinity we observe between peoples of Corded Ware and Sintashta cultures suggests similar genetic sources of the two... Among Bronze Age Europeans, the highest tolerance frequency was found in Corded Ware and the closely-related Scandinavian Bronze Age cultures... The Andronovo culture, which arose in Central Asia during the later Bronze Age, is genetically closely related to the Sintashta peoples, and clearly distinct from both Yamnaya and Afanasievo. Therefore, Andronovo represents a temporal and geographical extension of the Sintashta gene pool, as there are many similarities between Sintasthta/Androvono rituals and those described in the Rig Veda and such similarities even extend as far as to the Nordic Bronze Age.")

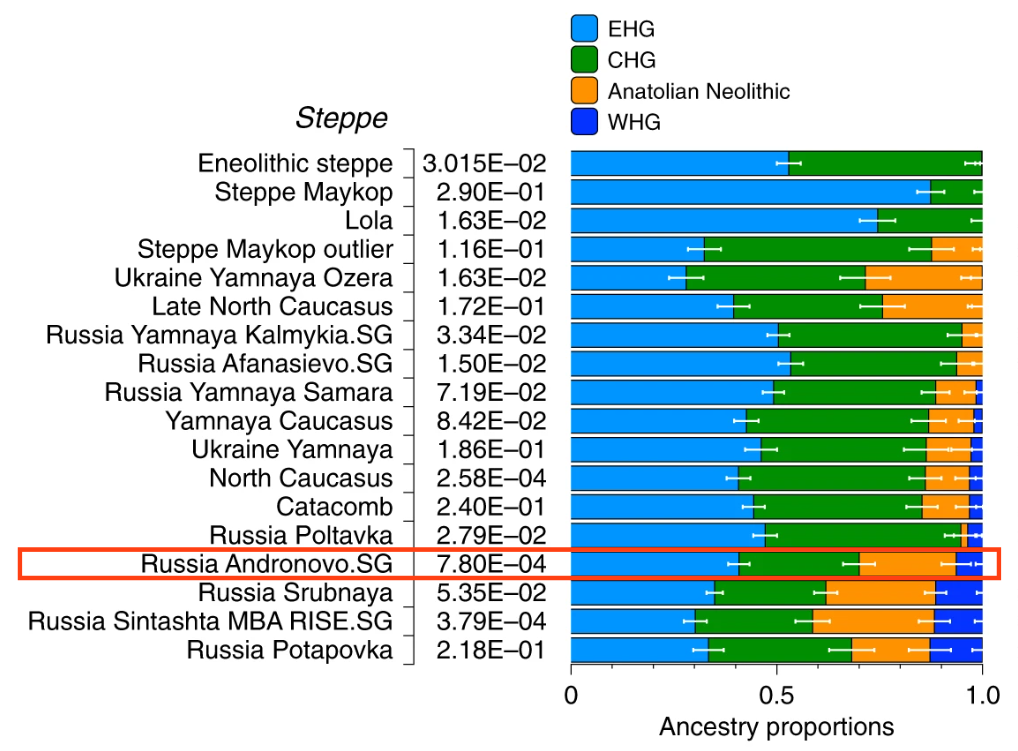
Admixture proportions of Andronovo populations modelled by Wang et al. (2019). They combined Eastern Hunter Gatherer ( EHG), Caucasian Hunter-Gatherer ( CHG), Anatolian Neolithic ( ) and Western Hunter Gatherer ( WHG) ancestry.

A genetic study published in Nature in May 2018 examined the remains of an Andronovo female buried c. 1200 BC. She was found to be a carrier of the maternal haplogroup U2e1h.

In a genetic study published in Science in September 2019, a large number of remains from the Andronovo horizon was examined. The vast majority of Y-DNA extracted belonged to R1a1a1b or various subclades of it (particularly R1a1a1b2a2a). The majority of mtDNA samples extracted belonged to U, although other haplogroups also occurred. The people of the Andronovo culture were found to be closely genetically related to the people of the Corded Ware culture, the Potapovka culture, the Sintashta culture and Srubnaya culture. These were found to harbour mixed ancestry from the Yamnaya culture and Anatolian Neolithic farmers. (Note: "We observed a main cluster of Sintashta individuals that was similar to Srubnaya, Potapovka, and Andronovo in being well modeled as a mixture of Yamnaya-related and Anatolian Neolithic (European agriculturalist-related) ancestry.") (Note: "Genetic analysis indicates that the individuals in our study classified as falling within the Andronovo complex are genetically similar to the main clusters of Potapovka, Sintashta, and Srubnaya in being well modeled as a mixture of Yamnaya-related and early European agriculturalist-related or Anatolian agriculturalist-related ancestry.") People in the northwestern areas of Andronovo were found to be "genetically largely homogeneous" and "genetically almost indistinguishable" from Sintashta people. The genetic data suggested that the Andronovo culture and its Sintastha predecessor were ultimately derived of a remigration of Central European peoples with steppe ancestry back into the steppe. (Note: "Many of the samples from this group are individuals buried in association with artifacts of the Corded Ware, Srubnaya, Petrovka, Sintashta and Andronovo complexes, all of which harboreda mixture of Steppe_EMBA ancestry and ancestry from European Middle Neolithic agriculturalists (Europe_MN). This is consistent with previous findings showing that following westward movement of eastern European populations and mixture with local European agriculturalists, there was an eastward reflux back beyond the Urals.") This is in particular defined by the majority (n=12) of R-Z93 SNPs.

Manjusha Chintalapati, Nick Patterson, and Priya Moorjani (in a peer-reviewed paper, 18 July 2022) estimate through DATES (Distribution of Ancestry Tracts of Evolutionary Signals) that genetic characteristics, typical of Andronovo culture's people formed around 900 years before this archaeological culture appeared, c. 2900 BC.

== Gallery ==
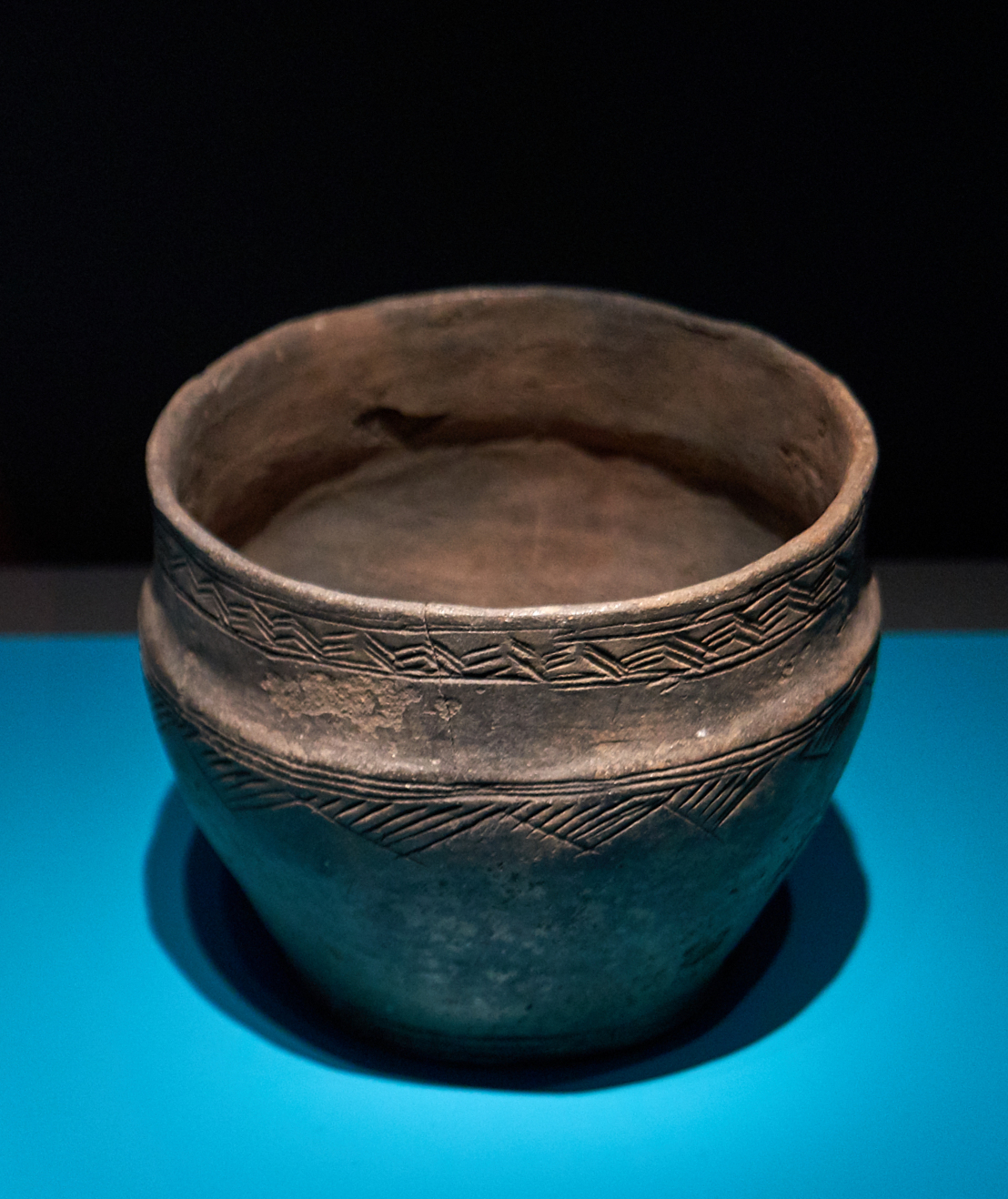
Andronovo decorated bowl

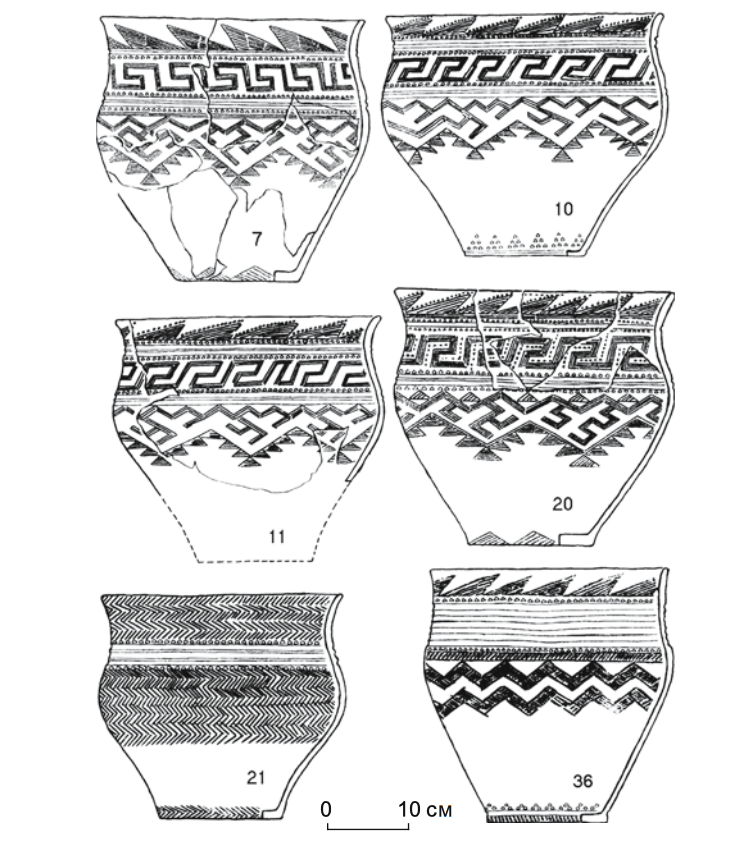
Andronovo ceramics

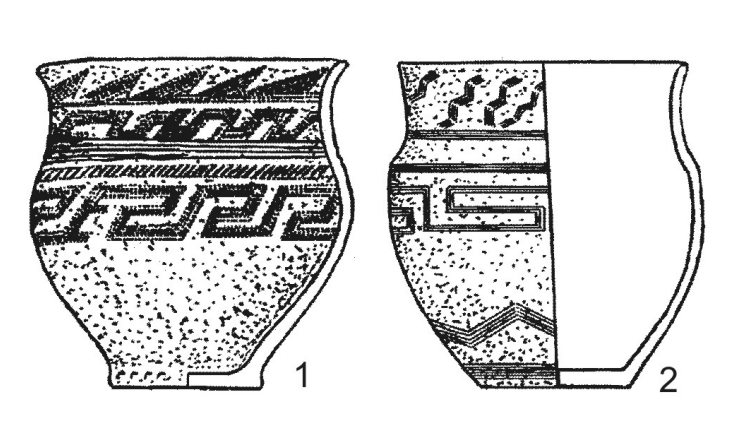
Andronovo ceramics

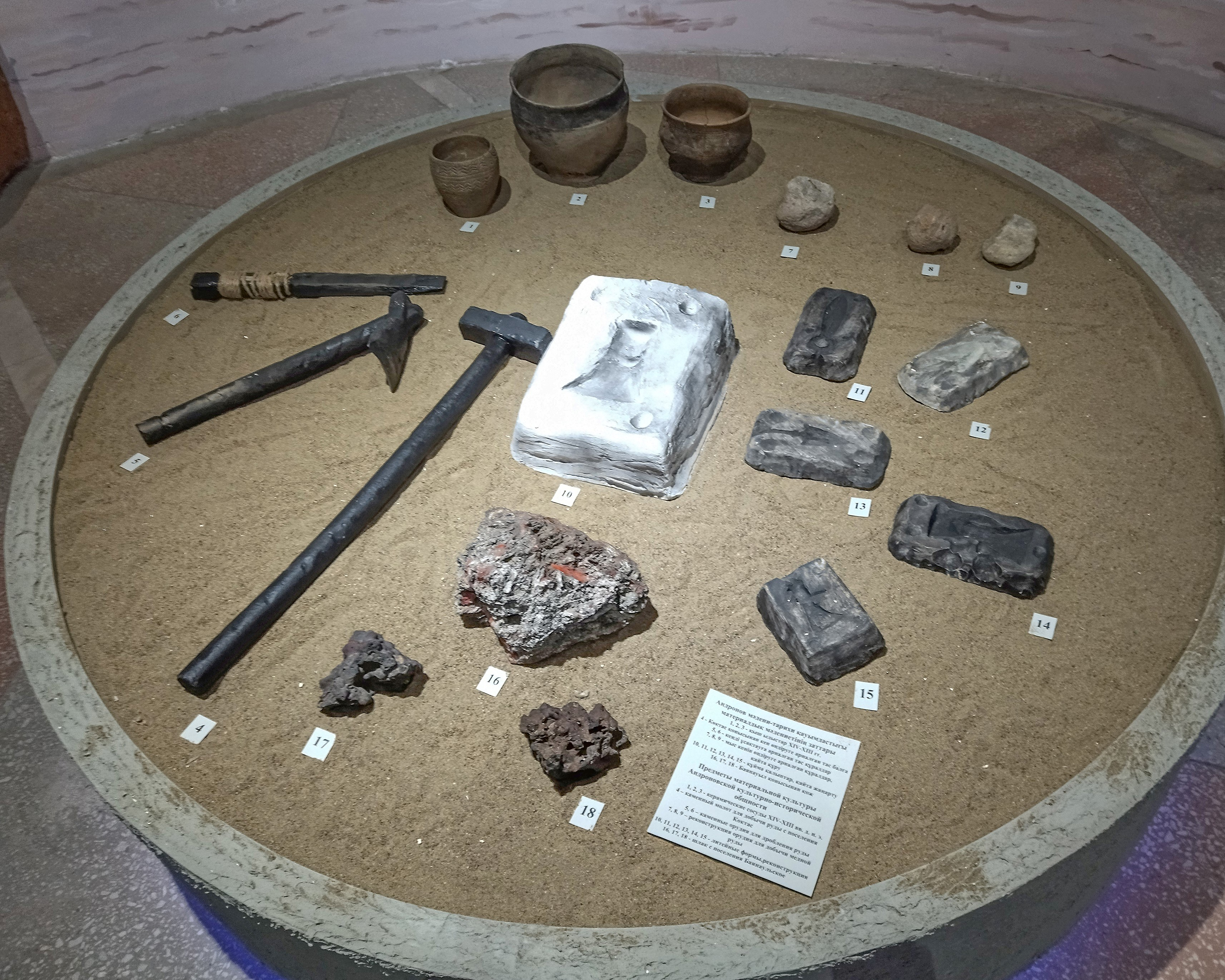
Andronovo tools, foundry molds and pottery

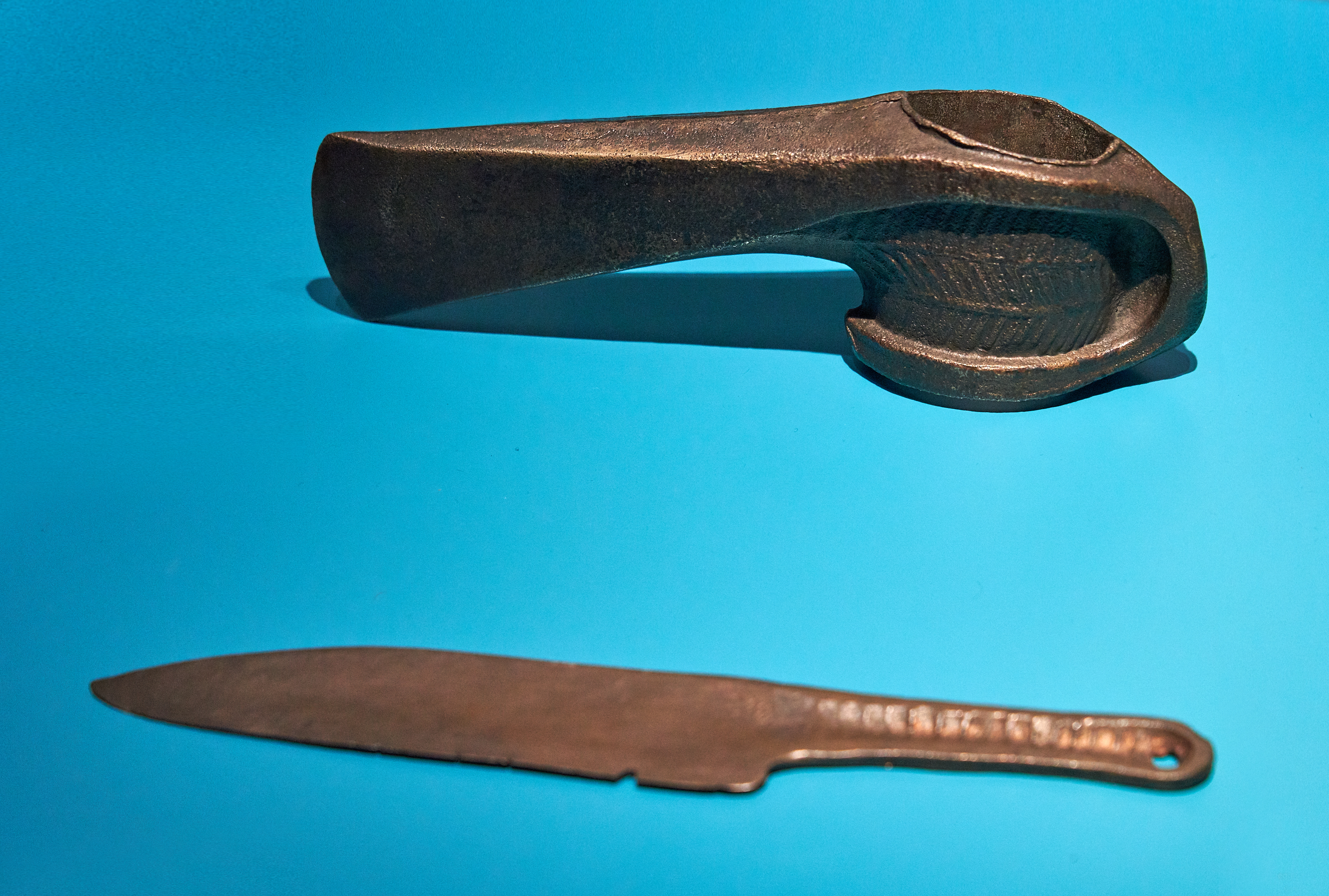
Andronovo axe and knife

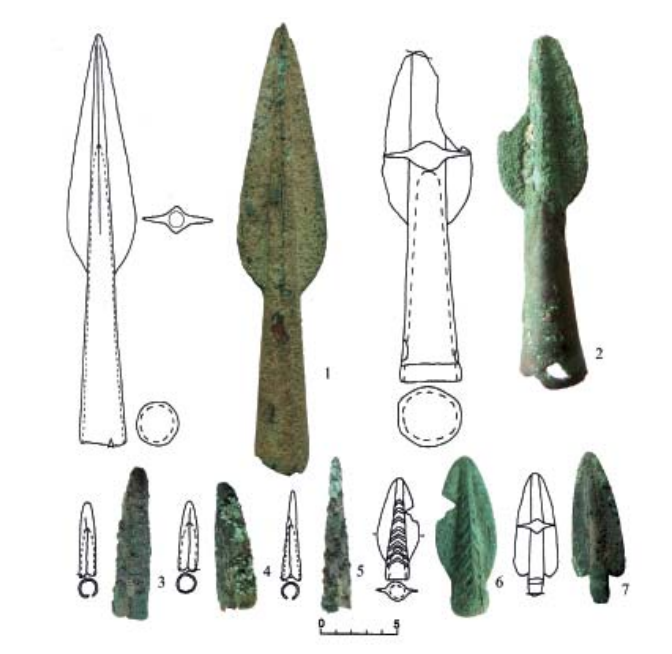
Spearheads and arrowheads from central Kazakhstan

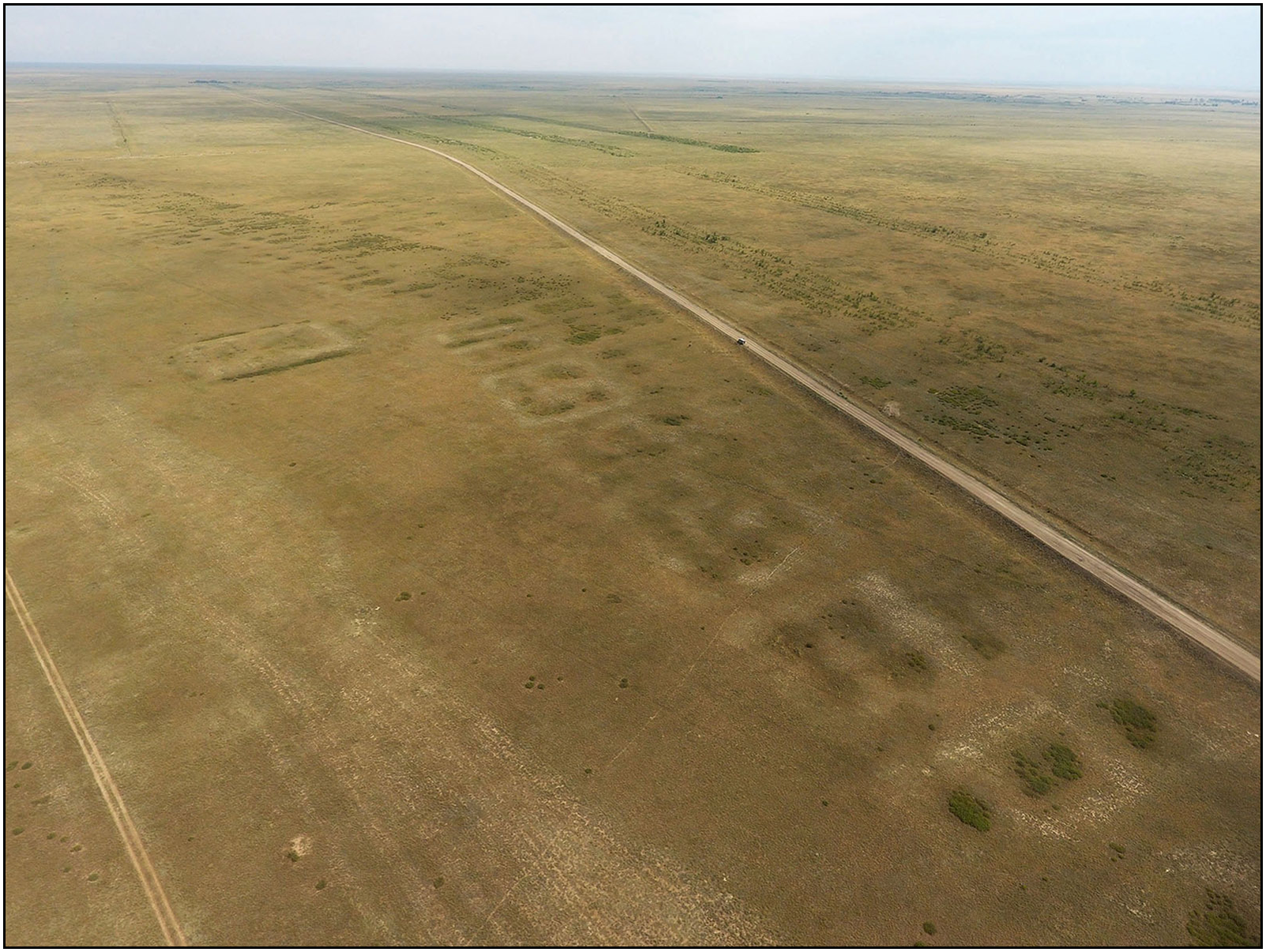
Site of the large settlement of Semiyarka, Kazakhstan, c. 1600 BC

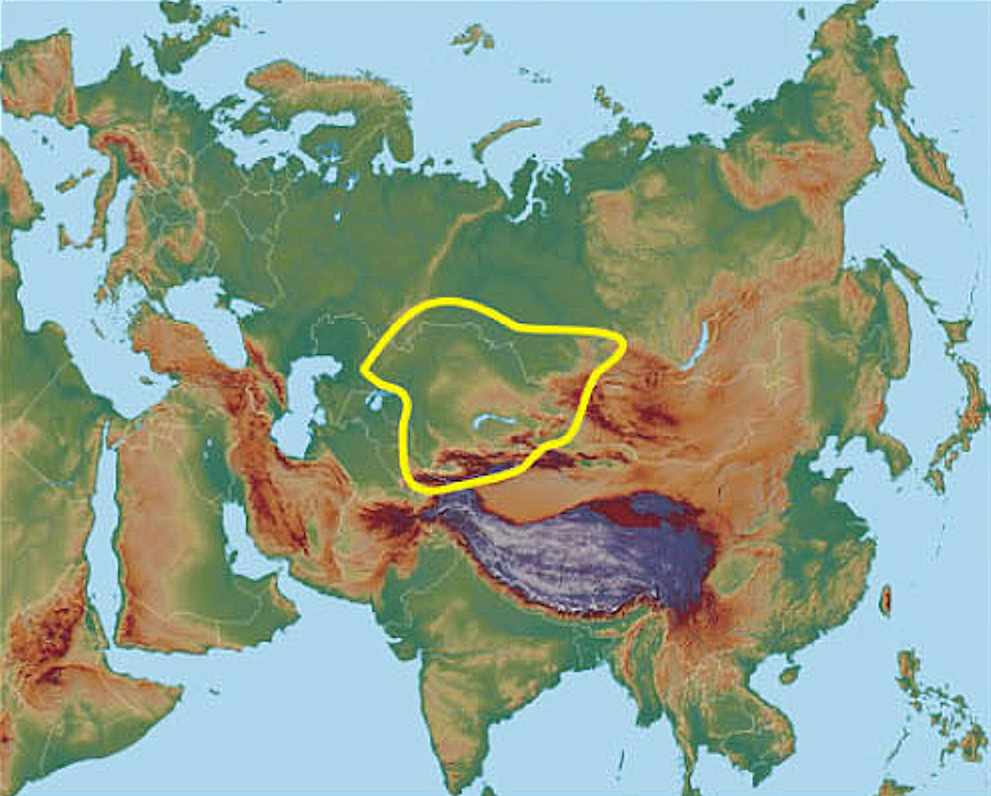
Andronovo area.

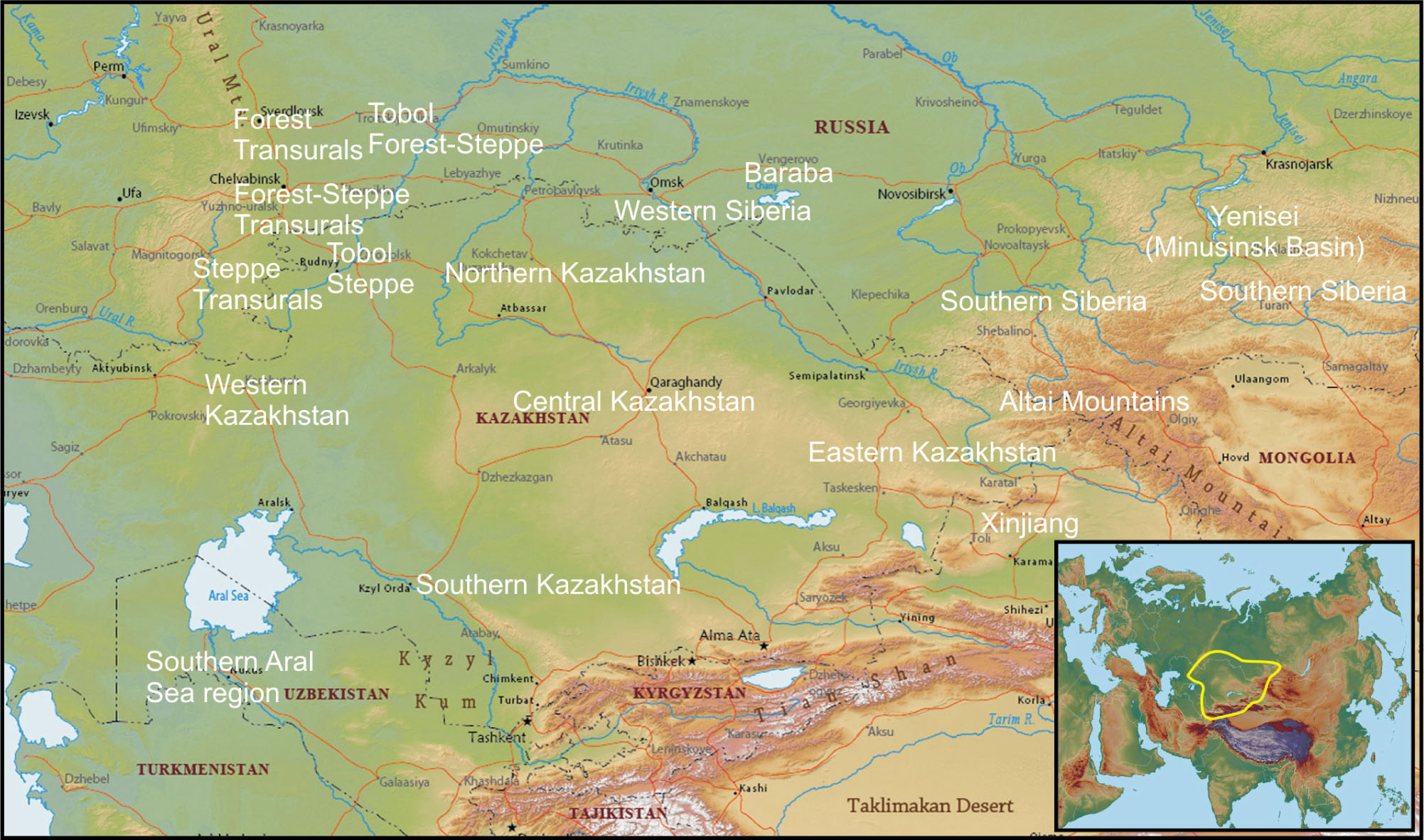
Andronovo distribution.

== See also ==
- Aryan
- Gandhara
- Multi-cordoned ware culture
- Abashevo culture
- Prehistory of Siberia
- Tazabagyab culture

== Sources ==
- Anthony, David; Vinogradov, Nikolai (1995), "Birth of the Chariot", Archaeology, vol. 48, no. 2, pp. 36–41.
- Beckwith, Christopher I. (16 March 2009). Empires of the Silk Road: A History of Central Eurasia from the Bronze Age to the Present. Princeton University Press. ISBN 978-0-691-13589-2.
- Bryant, Edwin (2001), The Quest for the Origins of Vedic Culture: The Indo-Aryan Migration Debate, Oxford University Press, ISBN 978-0-19-513777-4.
- Diakonoff, Igor M. (1995), "Two Recent Studies of Indo-Iranian Origins", Journal of the American Oriental Society, vol. 115, no. 3, pp. 473–477, doi:10.2307/606224, JSTOR 606224.
- Fussman, G.; Kellens, J.; Francfort, H. P.; Tremblay, X. (2005). Āryas, aryens et iraniens en Asie centrale. Paris: Collège de France. ISBN 2-86803-072-6.
- Jones-Bley, K.; Zdanovich, D. G. (eds.), Complex Societies of Central Eurasia from the 3rd to the 1st Millennium BC, 2 vols, JIES Monograph Series Nos. 45, 46, Washington D.C. (2002), ISBN 0-941694-83-6, ISBN 0-941694-86-0.
- Koryakova, L. (1998a). "Sintashta-Arkaim Culture". The Center for the Study of the Eurasian Nomads (CSEN). Archived from the original on 9 February 1999.
- Kuz'mina, E. E. (1994), Откуда пришли индоарии? (Whence came the Indo-Aryans), Moscow: Российская академия наук (Russian Academy of Sciences)
- Kuzmina, Elena E. (2007). Mallory, J. P. (ed.). The Origin of the Indo-Iranians. BRILL. ISBN 978-90-04-16054-5.
- Mallory, J. P. (1989). In Search of the Indo-Europeans: Language, Archaeology, and Myth. Thames and Hudson. ISBN 978-0-500-05052-1.
- Mallory, J. P. (1997). Encyclopedia of Indo-European Culture. Taylor & Francis. ISBN 978-1-884964-98-5.
- Mallory, J. P.; Mair, Victor H. (2008). The Tarim Mummies: Ancient China and the Mystery of the Earliest Peoples from the West. Thames & Hudson. ISBN 978-0-500-28372-1.
- Mathieson, Iain (23 November 2015). "Genome-wide patterns of selection in 230 ancient Eurasians". Nature. 528 (7583): 499–503. Bibcode:2015Natur.528..499M. doi:10.1038/nature16152. PMC 4918750. PMID 26595274.
- Narasimhan, Vagheesh M.; et al. (6 September 2019). "The formation of human populations in South and Central Asia". Science. 365 (6457) eaat7487. bioRxiv 10.1101/292581. doi:10.1126/science.aat7487. PMC 6822619. PMID 31488661.
- Parpola, Asko (2015), The Roots of Hinduism. The Early Aryans and the Indus Civilization, Oxford University Press
