= Suyarganovo culture =

Archaeological culture of the Bronze Age

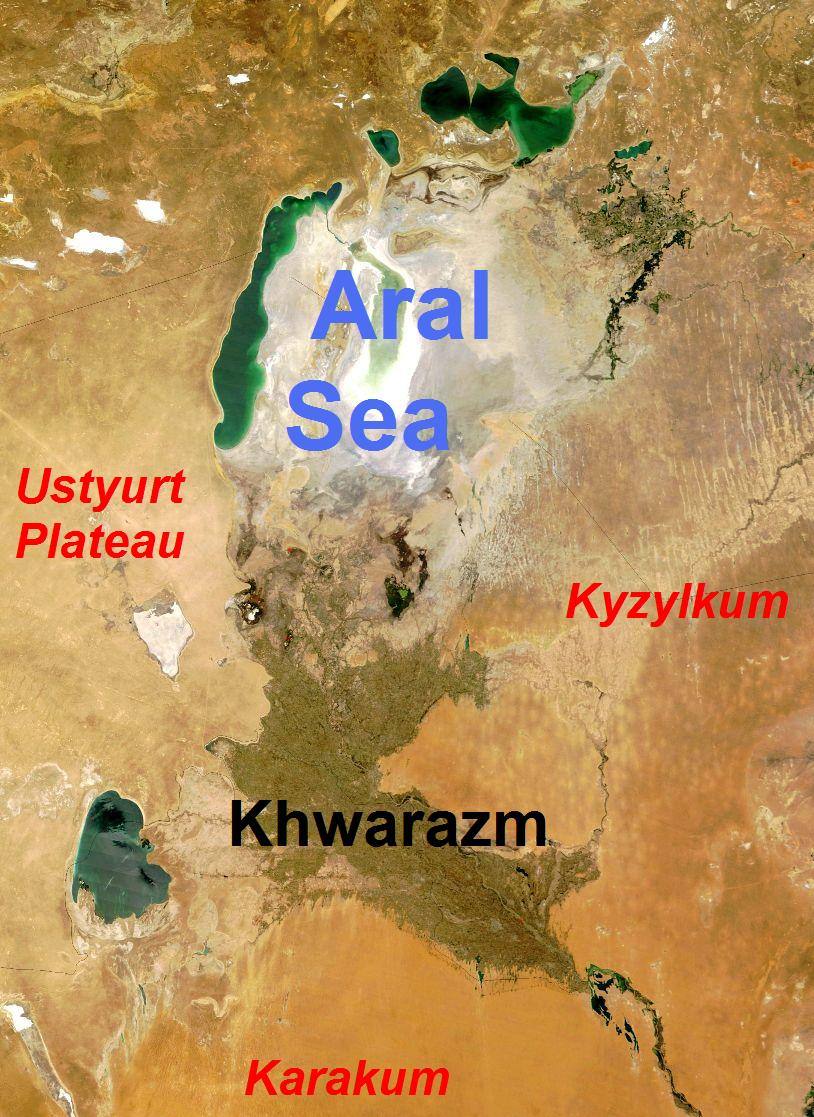
- Geographical range: Aral Sea region
- Period: Bronze Age
- Dates: c. 2000 BC – c. 1000 BC
- Preceded by: Kelteminar culture
- Followed by: Amirabad culture

The Suyarganovo culture was an archaeological culture of the late Bronze Age, appearing at the beginning of the second millennium BC, extending to around 1000 BC. The population of Suyarganovo culture, also known as Suyargan culture, lived in Aral, near Akcha Darya river (Amu Darya delta), the area of the historic Khwarezm. Stanislav Grigoriev (2016) suggests Suyarganovo culture began sometime around 2500-2000 BC.

In the middle of the second millennium BC, the population of Suyarganovo culture coexisted with the tribes of the Tazabagyab culture. Typical ceramics - flat-bottomed vessels (often with a red or orange color) with a short neck (often with carvings) and rounded torso. Homes and dwellings of Suyarganovo occupies a large area, mostly along the banks of fluvial channels.

== Stages ==
=== Post-Kelteminar ===
Main activity - hunting and fishing. Dwellings - columnar construction - ground, oval shape. The arrowheads, knives, scrapers from flint and quartzite. Flat-bottomed pottery modeled with a mixture of wood and seashells.

=== Kamyshli ===
Main activity - irrigation farming. Kamyshli stage after migration a new population, historically associated with the south, to the territory of Turkmenistan (Anau archaeological culture) and the Iranian plateau.

=== Kaunda ===
Main activity - herding. Bronze sickles and edged knives. Pottery was burned and carefully covered with relief ornament. Characterized by large dwellings of 250×150 m (Kaunda-1). The instruments were made of stone and bronze. Dwellings - rectangular huts. Closely associated with the population Tazabagyab archaeological culture.

== The ethnic origin ==
- Post-Kelteminar stage of Suyarganovo culture, some researchers have linked to the local Finno-Ugric component.
- Kamyshli stage associated with the population of the migration Hurrians-Mitanni tribes from Iranian plateau to the Aral Sea region in the II millennium b.c.
- The latest - Kaunda stage of Suyurganovo culture is a consequence of cultural and ethnic contact the population of Suyarganovo culture with Indo-Iranian tribes (Tazabagyab culture).

== The anthropological types ==
The basic anthropological type of population from Suyarganovo culture - Indo-dravidian, at a latest Kaunda stage with minor Eastern Mediterranean anthropological type characteristic of Andronovo tribes

== Archaeological dwellings ==
Kamyshli, Dzanbas-6 Kokcha-2, Bazar-2, Kaunda-1 and others.

== Literature ==
1. Гулямов Я. Г., История орошения Хорезма с древнейших времен до наших дней, Ташкент, 1957;
2. Толстов С. П., Итина М. A., Проблема суярганской культуры//CA, 1960, № 1;
3. Толстов С. П., По древним дельтам Окса и Яксарта, М., 1962.

== See also ==
- Tazabagyab culture
