= Otradnensky =

Otradnensky (masculine), Otradnenskaya (feminine), or Otradnenskoye (neuter) may refer to:

- Otradnensky District, a district of Krasnodar Krai, Russia
- Otradnenskoye Urban Settlement, a municipal formation corresponding to Otrandenskoye Settlement Municipal Formation, an administrative division of Kirovsky District of Leningrad Oblast, Russia
- Otradnenskoye (rural locality), a rural locality (a selo) in Novosibirsk Oblast
