= Otradnoye, Vozhegodsky District, Vologda Oblast =

Otradnoye Отрадное
- Selo
- Location within Vologda Oblast Location within Russia
- Coordinates: 60°32′N 40°24′E
- Country: Russia
- Region: Vologda Oblast
- District: Vozhegodsky District
- Time zone: UTC+3:00

Otradnoye (Russian: Отрадное) is a rural locality (a selo) in Yavengskoye Rural Settlement, Vozhegodsky District, Vologda Oblast, Russia. The population was 12 as of 2002.

== Geography ==
Otradnoye is located 19 km, by road, northeast of Vozhega, the district's administrative center. Funikovo is the nearest rural locality.
