= Inner Asian Mountain Corridor =

Ancient exchange route in Central Asia

The Inner Asian Mountain Corridor (IAMC) was an ancient exchange route in Inner Asia, ranging from the Altai Mountains in Central Asia to the Hindu Kush in South Asia (present-day Afghanistan and northern Pakistan), which took shape in the 3rd millennium BCE. The expansion of the Indo-European Andronovo culture towards the Bactria-Margiana Culture in the second millennium BCE took place along the IAMC, giving way to the Indo-Aryan migration into the Indian subcontinent.

== Mountain Corridor ==
The IAMC contributed to the development of mobile pastoralism in the 4th millennium BCE. Bronze Age mobile pastoralists acted as agents between Central Asian cultures and South Asian cultures via the IAMC, spreading domesticated wheats from South and East Asia to Inner Asia. Bronze Age pastoralists also transmitted horse riding and bronze technology between Europe and China, but also into the Indian subcontinent.

== Indo-European migrations ==
In the fourth millennium BCE a mobile pastoralist culture emerged at the Eurasian steppes. From the Pontic–Caspian steppe (present-day Ukraine and Russia), the Indo-European Yamna culture spread westwards toward the Great Hungarian Plain; and north-west it developed into the Corded Ware culture. Expanding eastward, Corded Ware eventually developed into the Sintashta culture, which further developed into the Andronovo culture. According to Narasimhan et al. (2018), the Andronovo-culture extended southwards via the IAMC, reaching into the Bactria-Margiana Culture, from where Indo-European language and culture reached the Indian subcontinent.

== Sources ==
- Frachetti, Michael D.; Rouse, Lynne M. (2012), "Central Asia, the steppe, and the near east, 2500–1500 BC" (PDF), in Potts, D.T. (ed.), A Companion to the Archaeology of the Ancient Near East (first ed.), Blackwell Publishing
- Frachetti, Michael (2016), "Bronze Age Pastoralism and Differentiated Landscapes along the Inner Asia Mountain Corridor", in Abraham, Shinu Anna; Gullapalli, Praveena; Raczek, Teresa P.; Rizvi, Uzma Z. (eds.), Connections and Complexity: New Approaches to the Archaeology of South Asia, Routledge
- Narasimhan, Vagheesh M.; Anthony, David; Mallory, James; Reich, David (2019), "The formation of human populations in South and Central Asia", Science, 365 (6457) eaat7487, Bibcode:2019Sci...365t7487N, bioRxiv 10.1101/292581, doi:10.1126/science.aat7487, PMC 6822619, PMID 31488661
- Spengler, Robert; Rouse, Lynne M.; Bullion, Elissa; Dupuy, Paula Doumani; Cerasetti, Barbara; Frachetti, Michael D. (2014), "Early agriculture and crop transmission among Bronze Age mobile pastoralists of Central Eurasia", Proceedings of the Royal Society, 281 (1783) 20133382, doi:10.1098/rspb.2013.3382, PMC 3996608, PMID 24695428
