= Otradnoye, Buturlinovsky District, Voronezh Oblast =

Otradnoye Отрадное
- Selo
- Location within Voronezh Oblast Location within Russia
- Coordinates: 50°53′N 40°34′E
- Country: Russia
- Region: Voronezh Oblast
- District: Buturlinovsky District
- Time zone: UTC+3:00

Otradnoye (Russian: Отрадное) is a rural locality (a selo) in Buturlinovka Urban Settlement, Buturlinovsky District, Voronezh Oblast, Russia. The population was 63 as of 2010. There are three streets.

== Geography ==
Otradnoye is located 6 km north of Buturlinovka (the district's administrative centre) by road. Krugly is the nearest rural locality.
