= Otradnoye, Vologodsky District, Vologda Oblast =

Otradnoye Отрадное
- Village
- Location within Vologda Oblast Location within Russia
- Coordinates: 59°13′N 39°37′E
- Country: Russia
- Region: Vologda Oblast
- District: Vologodsky District
- Time zone: UTC+3:00

Otradnoye (Russian: Отрадное) is a rural locality (a village) in Leskovskoye Rural Settlement, Vologodsky District, Vologda Oblast, Russia. The population was 2 as of 2002.

== Geography ==
Otradnoye is located 19 km west of Vologda (the district's administrative centre) by road. Yuryevo is the nearest rural locality.
