= Otradnoye, Volokonovsky District, Belgorod Oblast =

Otradnoye Отрадное
- Settlement
- Location within Belgorod Oblast Location within Russia
- Coordinates: 50°34′N 37°37′E
- Country: Russia
- Region: Belgorod Oblast
- District: Volokonovsky District
- Time zone: UTC+3:00

Otradnoye (Russian: Отрадное) is a rural locality (a settlement) in Volokonovsky District, Belgorod Oblast, Russia. The population was 17 as of 2010. There is 1 street.

== Geography ==
Otradnoye is located 28 km northwest of Volokonovka (the district's administrative centre) by road. Novaya Dolina is the nearest rural locality.
