= Otradnoye, Volgograd Oblast =

Otradnoye Отрадное
- Settlement
- Location within Volgograd Oblast Location within Russia
- Coordinates: 50°00′N 43°10′E
- Country: Russia
- Region: Volgograd Oblast
- District: Mikhaylovka Urban Okrug
- Time zone: UTC+4:00

Otradnoye (Russian: Отрадное) is a rural locality (a settlement) in Mikhaylovka Urban Okrug, Volgograd Oblast, Russia. The population was 1,889 as of 2010. There are 38 streets.

== Geography ==
Otradnoye is located 13 km southeast of Mikhaylovka. Semenovod is the nearest rural locality.
