= Otradnaya, Otradnensky District, Krasnodar Krai =

Rural locality in Krasnodar Krai, Russia

Coordinates: 44°23′49″N 41°30′48″E

Otradnaya (Russian: Отра́дная) is a rural locality (a stanitsa) and the administrative center of Otradnensky District, Krasnodar Krai, Russia. Population: 23,204 (2010 census); 22,692 (2002 census); 20,653 (1989 Soviet census).
