= Vidradne =

Vidrade (Ukrainian: Відрадне) is a Ukrainian place name which can refer to:

- Vidradne (urban-type settlement), an urban-type settlement in Crimea
- Vidradne, Zaporizhia Raion, a rural settlement in Zaporizhia Oblast
