= Otradnoye, Novousmansky District, Voronezh Oblast =

Otradnoye Отрадное
- Settlement
- Location within Voronezh Oblast Location within Russia
- Coordinates: 51°39′N 39°20′E
- Country: Russia
- Region: Voronezh Oblast
- District: Novousmansky District
- Time zone: UTC+3:00

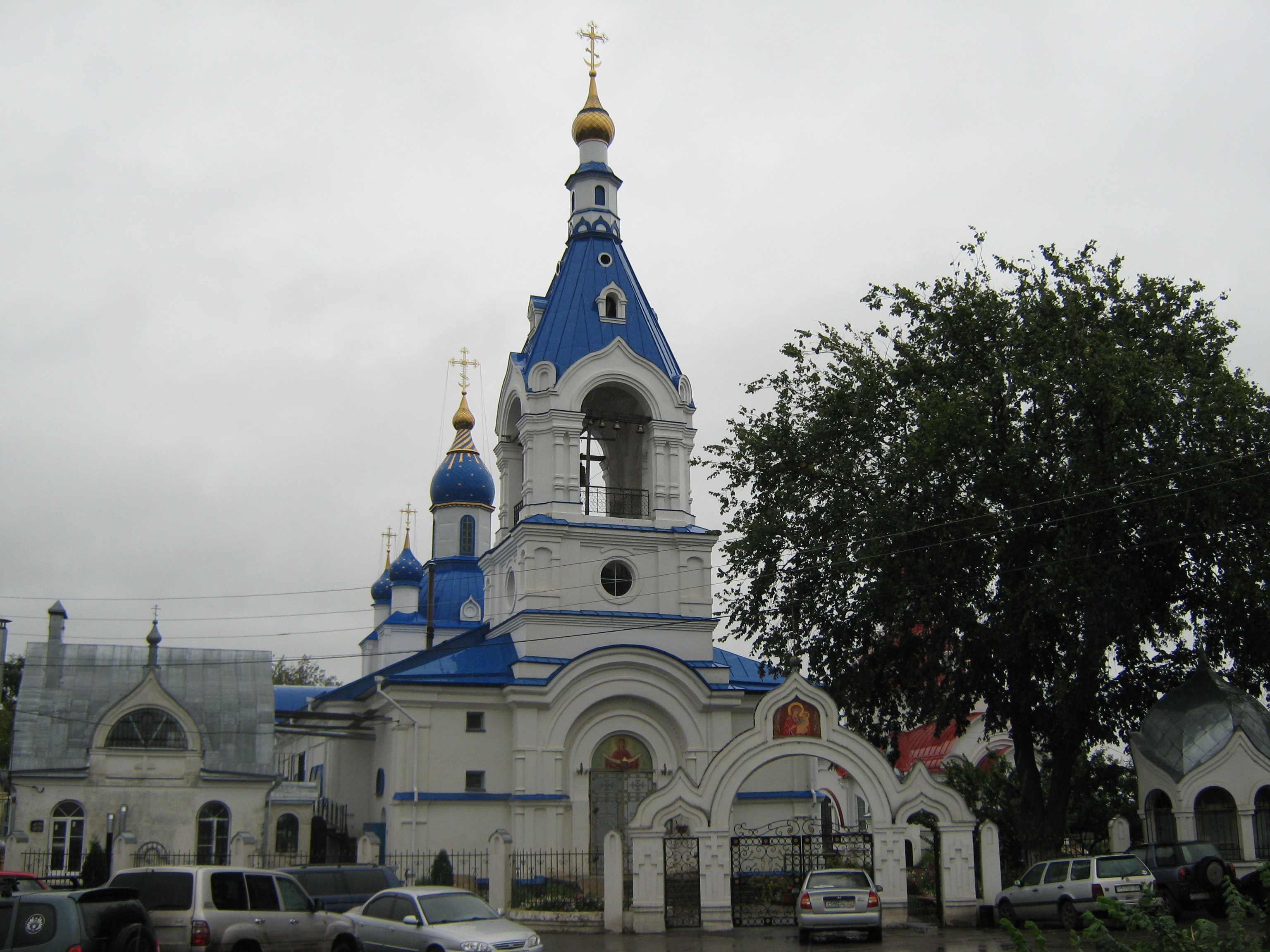
Church of the Holy Virgin in Otradnoye

Otradnoye (Russian: Отрадное) is a rural locality (a settlement) and the administrative center of Otradnenskoye Rural Settlement, Novousmansky District, Voronezh Oblast, Russia. The population was 9,709 (2021 census); 4,581 as of 2010. There are 104 streets.

== Geography ==
Otradnoye is located 11 km northwest of Novaya Usman (the district's administrative centre) by road. Gololobovo is the nearest rural locality.
