= Funikovo =

Funikovo Фуниково
- Village
- Location within Vologda Oblast Location within Russia
- Coordinates: 60°32′N 40°24′E
- Country: Russia
- Region: Vologda Oblast
- District: Vozhegodsky District
- Time zone: UTC+3:00

Funikovo (Russian: Фуниково) is a rural locality (a village) in Yavengskoye Rural Settlement, Vozhegodsky District, Vologda Oblast, Russia. The population was 12 as of 2002.

== Geography ==
Funikovo is located 19 km northeast of Vozhega (the district's administrative centre) by road. Otradnoye is the nearest rural locality.
