= Kelteminar culture =

Neolithic archaeological culture

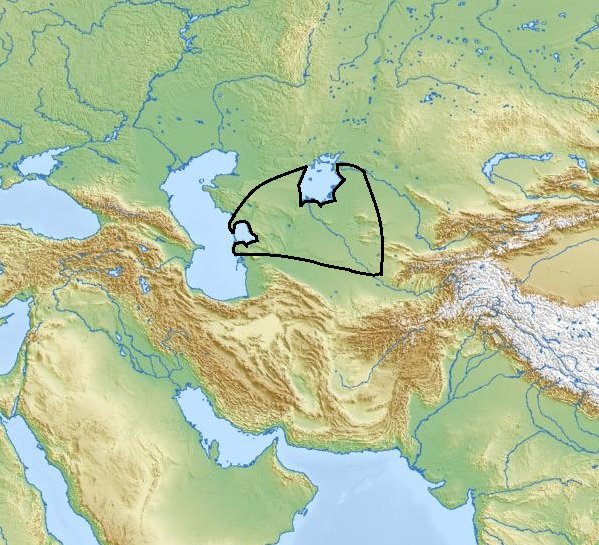
- Geographical range: Central Asia
- Period: Neolithic
- Dates: c. 5500 BC – c. 3500 BC
- Preceded by: Jeitun culture
- Followed by: Suyarganovo culture Tazabagyab culture Boborykino culture

The Kelteminar culture (5500–3500 BCE) was a Neolithic archaeological culture of sedentary fishermen occupying the semi-desert and desert areas of the Karakum and Kyzyl Kum deserts and the deltas of the Amu Darya and Zeravshan rivers in the territories of ancient Kazakhstan, Turkmenistan, and Uzbekistan.

The culture was discovered and first excavated in 1939 by the USSR Chorasmian Archaeological and Ethnographic Expedition under leadership of S.P. Tolstoy, who first described it. It is named after a site of the same name. The Kelteminar culture was replaced by the Tazabagyab culture.

The Kelteminar people practised a mobile hunting, gathering and fishing subsistence system. Over time, they adopted stockbreeding. With the Late Glacial warming, up to the Atlantic Phase of the Post-Glacial Optimum, Mesolithic groups moved north into this area from the Hissar (6000–4000 BCE). These groups brought with them the bow and arrow and the dog, elements of what Kent Flannery has called the "broad-spectrum revolution".

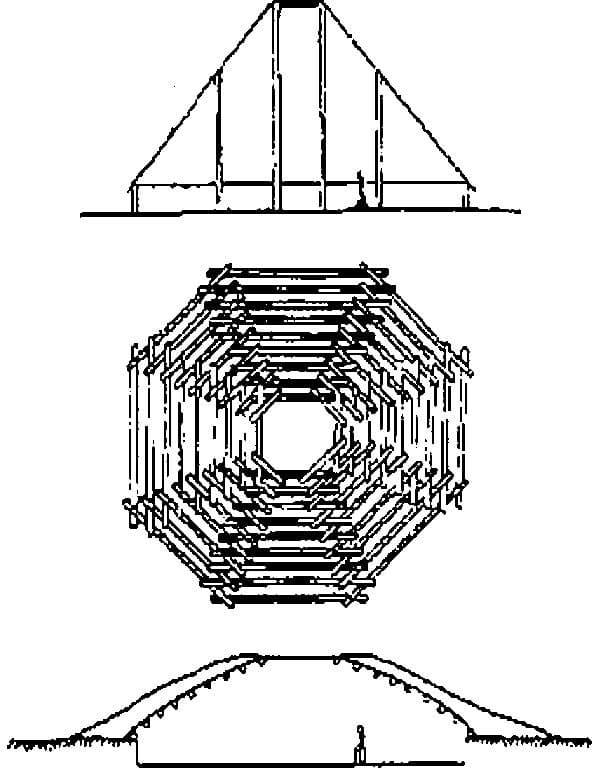
Kelteminar housing

Some Russian scientists believe that Kelteminar culture is related to the Pit–Comb Ware culture and belonged to a Finno-Ugric people.

The Kelteminar people lived in huge houses (size 24m x 17m and height 10m), which housed the whole tribal community of about 100-120 people. They adorned themselves with beads made of shells. They manufactured stone axes and miniature trapezoidal flint arrowheads. For cooking, they used clay vessels produced without the potter's wheel.

The Kelteminar economy was based on sedentary fishing and hunting.

== Literature ==
- Tolstov S.P. Following ancient Horesm civilization, Part 2. Ch. 5 (In Russian)
- Rtveladze E. Civilizations, nations, cultures of Central Asia, Tashkent, 2005 (In Russian)
- Kelteminar Culture Flourishes in Central Asia
