= Otradnoye, Belgorodsky District, Belgorod Oblast =

Rural locality in Belgorodsky District, Belgorod Oblast, Russia

Coordinates: 50°24′45″N 36°19′40″E

Otradnoye (also spelt Otradny and Otradnoe) is a village in the Belgorodsky District of Belgorod Oblast, Russia. During the 2022 Russian invasion of Ukraine a single shell landed in the village. No damage occurred.
