= Otradnensky District =

Otradnensky District Отрадненский район (Russian)
- District
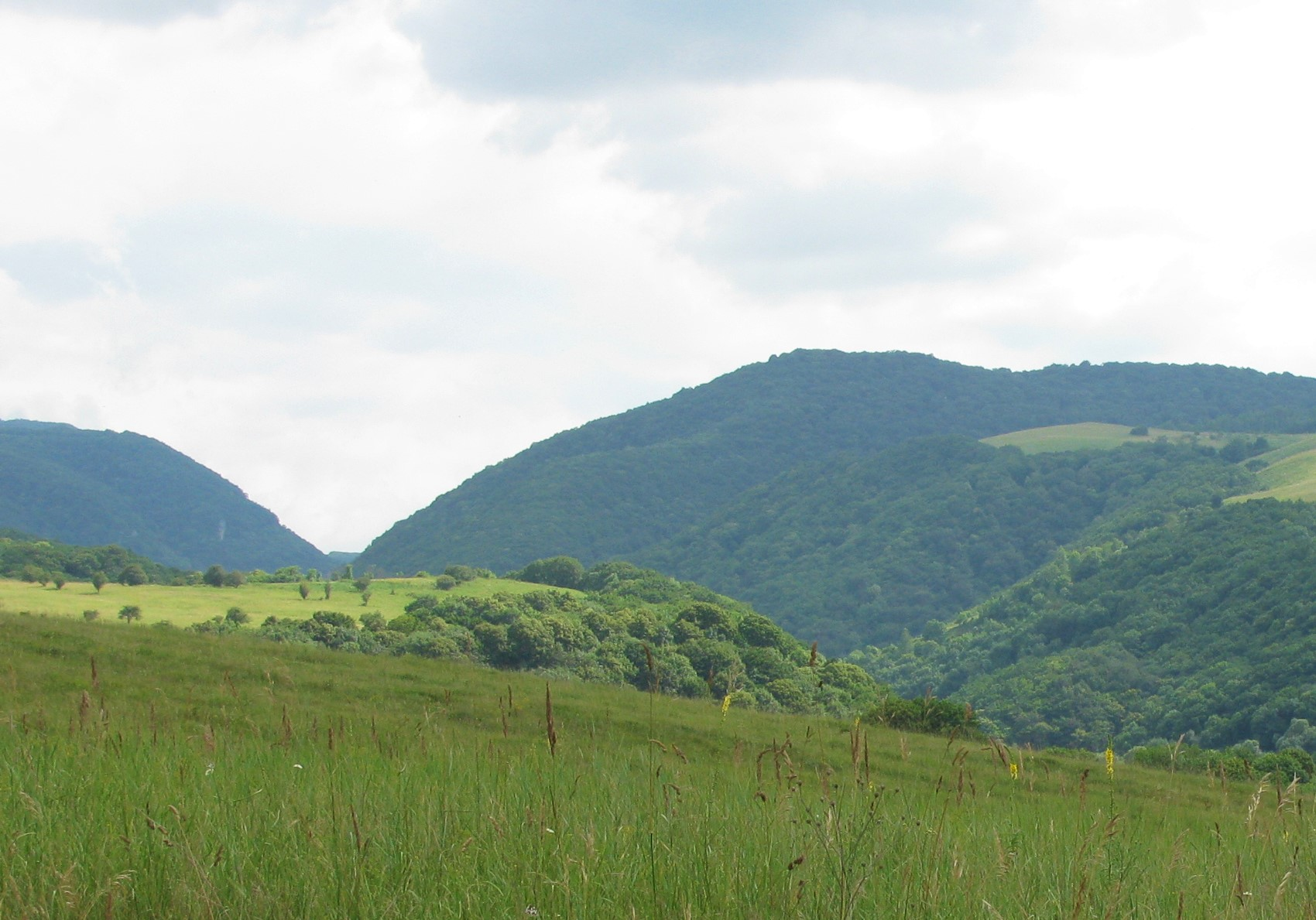
- Kuva Gorge, Otradnensky District

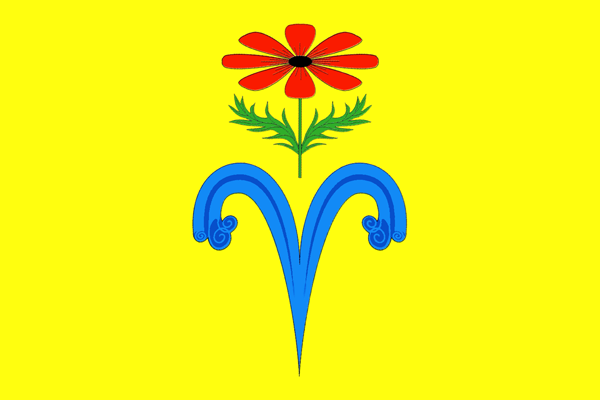
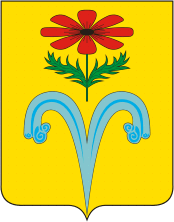
- Flag Coat of arms
- Location of Otradnensky District in Krasnodar Krai
- Coordinates: 44°23′48″N 41°31′35″E
- Country: Russia
- Federal subject: Krasnodar Krai
- Established: 1924
- Administrative center: Otradnaya

Area
  - Total: 2,452 km^{2} (947 sq mi)

Population (2010 Census)
  - Total: 64,862
  - Density: 26.45/km^{2} (68.51/sq mi)
  - Urban: 0%
  - Rural: 100%

Administrative structure
  - Administrative divisions: 14 Rural okrugs
  - Inhabited localities: 57 rural localities

Municipal structure
  - Municipally incorporated as: Otradnensky Municipal District
  - Municipal divisions: 0 urban settlements, 14 rural settlements
- Time zone: UTC+3 (MSK)
- OKTMO ID: 03637000
- Website: http://www.otradnaya.ru/

Otradnensky District (Russian: Отра́дненский райо́н) is an administrative district (raion), one of the thirty-eight in Krasnodar Krai, Russia. As a municipal division, it is incorporated as Otradnensky Municipal District. It is located in the southeast of the krai. The area of the district is 2,452 square kilometers (947 sq mi). Its administrative center is the rural locality (a stanitsa) of Otradnaya. Population: 64,862 (2010 census); 66,734 (2002 census); 63,803 (1989 Soviet census). The population of Otradnaya accounts for 35.8% of the district's total population.
