= Kytmanovo =

Kytmanovo Кытманово
- Selo
- Interactive map of Kytmanovo
- Location of Kytmanovo Kytmanovo (Altai Krai)
- Coordinates: 53°27′25″N 85°26′49″E
- Country: Russia
- Federal subject: Altai Krai
- Administrative district: Kytmanovsky District
- SelsovietSelsoviet: Kytmanovsky Selsoviet
- Founded: 1763

Population (2010 Census)
  - Total: 3,873
  - Estimate (2021): 3,298 (−14.8%)

Administrative status
  - Capital of: Kytmanovsky District, Kytmanovsky Selsoviet

Municipal status
  - Municipal district: Kytmanovsky Municipal District
  - Rural settlement: Kytmanovsky Selsoviet Rural Settlement
  - Capital of: Kytmanovsky Municipal District, Kytmanovsky Selsoviet Rural Settlement
- Time zone: UTC+7 (MSK+4)
- Postal code: 659240
- OKTMO ID: 01624423101

Kytmanovo (Russian: Кытманово) is a rural locality (a selo) and the administrative center of Kytmanovsky District of Altai Krai, Russia. Population: 3,873 (2010 census); 4,216 (2002 census); 4,236 (1989 Soviet census).
