= Kytmanovsky District =

Kytmanovsky District Кытмановский район (Russian)
- District
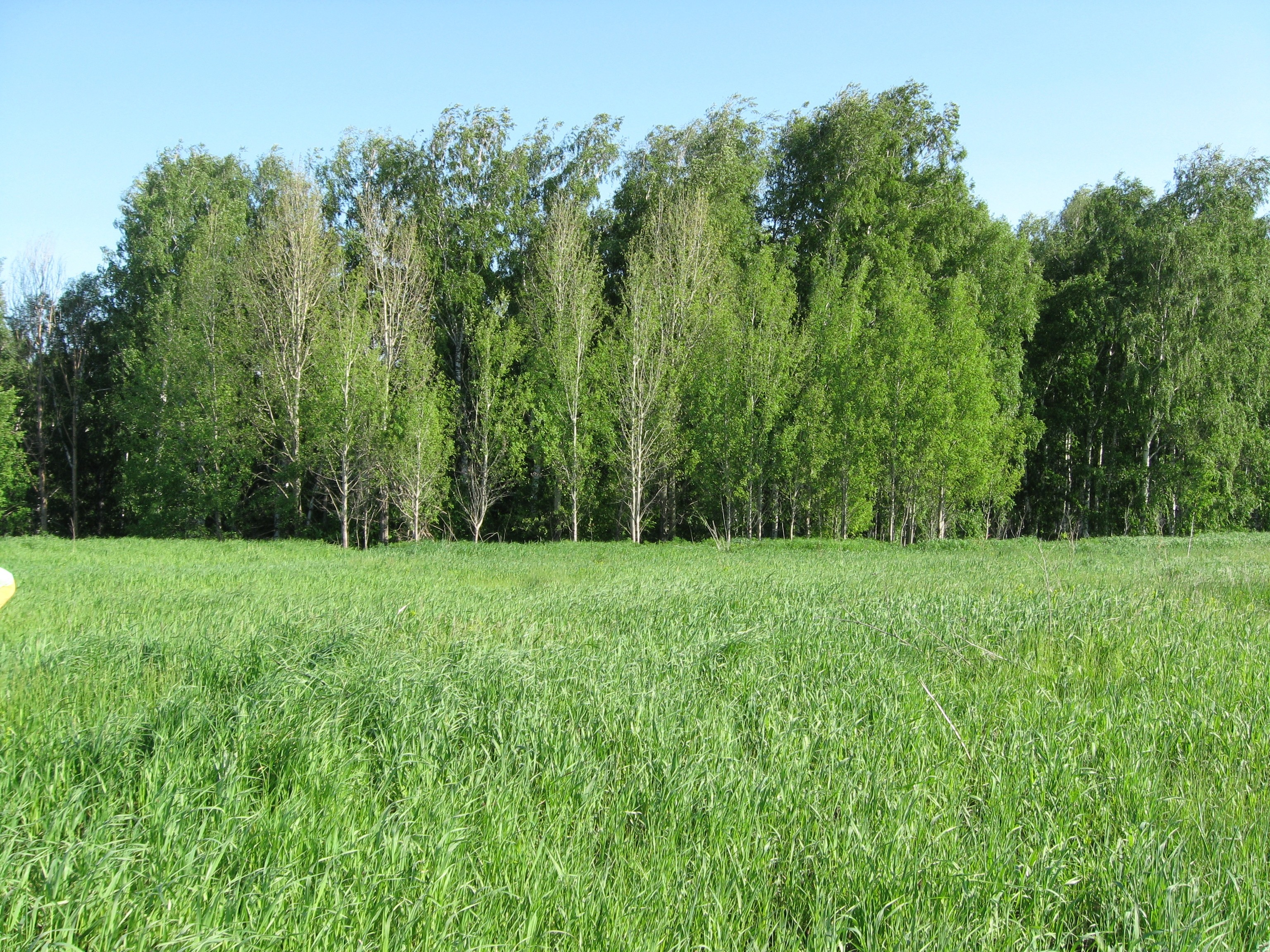
- Landscape in Kytmanovsky District
- Location of Kytmanovsky District in Altai Krai
- Coordinates: 53°28′N 85°28′E
- Country: Russia
- Federal subject: Altai Krai
- Established: 1922
- Administrative center: Kytmanovo

Area
  - Total: 2,550 km^{2} (980 sq mi)

Population (2010 Census)
  - Total: 13,896
  - Density: 5.45/km^{2} (14.1/sq mi)
  - Urban: 0%
  - Rural: 100%

Administrative structure
  - Administrative divisions: 10 selsoviet
  - Inhabited localities: 33 rural localities

Municipal structure
  - Municipally incorporated as: Kytmanovsky Municipal District
  - Municipal divisions: 0 urban settlements, 10 rural settlements
- Time zone: UTC+7 (MSK+4)
- OKTMO ID: 01624000
- Website: www.altairegion22.ru

Kytmanovsky District (Russian: Кы́тмановский райо́н) is an administrative and municipal district (raion), one of the fifty-nine in Altai Krai, Russia. It is located in the northeast of the krai. The area of the district is 2,550 square kilometers (980 sq mi). Its administrative center is the rural locality (a selo) of Kytmanovo. Population: 13,896 (2010 census); 17,257 (2002 census); 18,469 (1989 Soviet census). The population of Kytmanovo accounts for 27.9% of the district's total population.
