= Plotnikov 2-y =

Plotnikov 2-y Плотников 2-й
- Khutor
- Location within Volgograd Oblast Location within Russia
- Coordinates: 50°24′N 43°34′E
- Country: Russia
- Region: Volgograd Oblast
- District: Mikhaylovka Urban Okrug
- Time zone: UTC+4:00

Plotnikov 2-y (Russian: Плотников 2-й) is a rural locality (a khutor) in Mikhaylovka Urban Okrug, Volgograd Oblast, Russia. The population was 1,088 as of 2010. There are 22 streets.

== Geography ==
Plotnikov 2-y is located 56 km northeast of Mikhaylovka. Sekachi is the nearest rural locality.
