= Bolshoy, Mikhaylovka Urban Okrug, Volgograd Oblast =

Bolshoy Большой
- Khutor
- Location within Volgograd Oblast Location within Russia
- Coordinates: 50°13′N 43°26′E
- Country: Russia
- Region: Volgograd Oblast
- District: Mikhaylovka Urban Okrug
- Time zone: UTC+4:00

Bolshoy (Russian: Большой) is a rural locality (a khutor) in Mikhaylovka Urban Okrug, Volgograd Oblast, Russia. The population was 1,630 as of 2010. There are 27 streets.

== Geography ==
Bolshoy is located 26 km northeast of Mikhaylovka. Mokhovsky is the nearest rural locality.
