= Sukhov 1-y =

Sukhov 1-y Сухов 1-й
- Khutor
- Location within Volgograd Oblast Location within Russia
- Coordinates: 49°55′N 43°24′E
- Country: Russia
- Region: Volgograd Oblast
- District: Mikhaylovka Urban Okrug
- Time zone: UTC+4:00

Sukhov 1-y (Russian: Сухов 1-й) is a rural locality (a khutor) in Mikhaylovka Urban Okrug, Volgograd Oblast, Russia. The population was 158 as of 2010. There are 12 streets.

== Geography ==
Sukhov 1-y is located 29 km southeast of Mikhaylovka. Abramov is the nearest rural locality.
