= Demochkin =

Demochkin Демочкин
- Khutor
- Location within Volgograd Oblast Location within Russia
- Coordinates: 49°51′N 43°02′E
- Country: Russia
- Region: Volgograd Oblast
- District: Mikhaylovka Urban Okrug
- Time zone: UTC+4:00

Demochkin (Russian: Демочкин) is a rural locality (a khutor) in Mikhaylovka Urban Okrug, Volgograd Oblast, Russia. The population was 63 as of 2010. There are 11 streets.

== Geography ==
Demochkin is located 36 km southwest of Mikhaylovka. Kurin is the nearest rural locality.
