= Grishin, Mikhaylovka Urban Okrug, Volgograd Oblast =

Grishin Гришин
- Khutor
- Location within Volgograd Oblast Location within Russia
- Coordinates: 50°29′N 43°25′E
- Country: Russia
- Region: Volgograd Oblast
- District: Mikhaylovka Urban Okrug
- Time zone: UTC+4:00

Grishin (Russian: Гришин) is a rural locality (a khutor) in Mikhaylovka Urban Okrug, Volgograd Oblast, Russia. The population was 11 as of 2010.

== Geography ==
Grishin is located 71 km northeast of Mikhaylovka. Talovka is the nearest rural locality.
