= Semenovod =

Semenovod Семеновод
- Khutor
- Location within Volgograd Oblast Location within Russia
- Coordinates: 49°59′N 43°10′E
- Country: Russia
- Region: Volgograd Oblast
- District: Mikhaylovka Urban Okrug
- Time zone: UTC+4:00

Semenovod (Russian: Семеновод) is a rural locality (a khutor) in Mikhaylovka Urban Okrug, Volgograd Oblast, Russia. The population was 72 as of 2010.

== Geography ==
Semenovod is located 16 km southwest of Mikhaylovka. Otradnoye is the nearest rural locality.
