= Glinishche =

Glinishche Глинище
- Khutor
- Location within Volgograd Oblast Location within Russia
- Coordinates: 50°05′N 43°30′E
- Country: Russia
- Region: Volgograd Oblast
- District: Mikhaylovka Urban Okrug
- Time zone: UTC+4:00

Glinishche (Russian: Глинище) is a rural locality (a khutor) in Mikhaylovka Urban Okrug, Volgograd Oblast, Russia. The population was 55 as of 2010. There are 5 streets.

== Geography ==
Glinishche is located 48 km east of Mikhaylovka. 2-y Sukhov is the nearest rural locality.
