= Mokhovsky =

Mokhovsky Моховский
- Khutor
- Location within Volgograd Oblast Location within Russia
- Coordinates: 50°11′N 43°24′E
- Country: Russia
- Region: Volgograd Oblast
- District: Mikhaylovka Urban Okrug
- Time zone: UTC+4:00

Mokhovsky (Russian: Моховский) is a rural locality (a khutor) in Mikhaylovka Urban Okrug, Volgograd Oblast, Russia. The population was 528 as of 2010. There are 17 streets.

== Geography ==
Mokhovsky is located 23 km northeast of Mikhaylovka. Maly Oreshkin is the nearest rural locality.
