= Stoylovsky =

Stoylovsky Стойловский
- Khutor
- Location within Volgograd Oblast Location within Russia
- Coordinates: 49°51′N 42°59′E
- Country: Russia
- Region: Volgograd Oblast
- District: Mikhaylovka Urban Okrug
- Time zone: UTC+4:00

Stoylovsky (Russian: Стойловский) is a rural locality (a khutor) in Mikhaylovka Urban Okrug, Volgograd Oblast, Russia. The population was 61 as of 2010. There are 5 streets.

== Geography ==
Stoylovsky is located 39 km southwest of Mikhaylovka. Blizhny is the nearest rural locality.
