= Tishanka, Mikhaylovka Urban Okrug, Volgograd Oblast =

Tishanka Тишанка
- Khutor
- Location within Volgograd Oblast Location within Russia
- Coordinates: 50°11′N 43°21′E
- Country: Russia
- Region: Volgograd Oblast
- District: Mikhaylovka Urban Okrug
- Time zone: UTC+4:00

Tishanka (Russian: Тишанка) is a rural locality (a khutor) in Mikhaylovka Urban Okrug, Volgograd Oblast, Russia. The population was 12 as of 2010.

== Geography ==
Tishanka is located 21 km northeast of Mikhaylovka. Mokhovsky is the nearest rural locality.
