= Kurin, Volgograd Oblast =

Kurin Курин
- Khutor
- Location within Volgograd Oblast Location within Russia
- Coordinates: 49°52′N 43°00′E
- Country: Russia
- Region: Volgograd Oblast
- District: Mikhaylovka Urban Okrug
- Time zone: UTC+4:00

Kurin (Russian: Курин) is a rural locality (a khutor) in Mikhaylovka Urban Okrug, Volgograd Oblast, Russia. The population was 56 as of 2010. There are 4 streets.

== Geography ==
Kurin is located 37 km southwest of Mikhaylovka. Demochkin is the nearest rural locality.
