= Sidory, Volgograd Oblast =

Sidory Сидоры
- Selo
- Location within Volgograd Oblast Location within Russia
- Coordinates: 50°07′N 43°20′E
- Country: Russia
- Region: Volgograd Oblast
- District: Mikhaylovka Urban Okrug
- Time zone: UTC+4:00

Sidory (Russian: Сидоры) is a rural locality (a selo) in Mikhaylovka Urban Okrug, Volgograd Oblast, Russia. The population was 2,515 as of 2010. There are 34 streets.

== Geography ==
Sidory is located 12 km northeast of Mikhaylovka. Sebrovo is the nearest rural locality.
