= Cheremukhov =

Cheremukhov Черемухов
- Khutor
- Location within Volgograd Oblast Location within Russia
- Coordinates: 50°02′N 43°32′E
- Country: Russia
- Region: Volgograd Oblast
- District: Mikhaylovka Urban Okrug
- Time zone: UTC+4:00

Cheremukhov (Russian: Черемухов) is a rural locality (a khutor) in Mikhaylovka Urban Okrug, Volgograd Oblast, Russia. The population was 175 as of 2010. There are 2 streets.

== Geography ==
Cheremukhov is located 45 km southeast of Mikhaylovka. 2-y Sukhov is the nearest rural locality.
