= Vesyoly, Mikhaylovka Urban Okrug, Volgograd Oblast =

Vesyoly Веселый
- Khutor
- Location within Volgograd Oblast Location within Russia
- Coordinates: 50°25′N 43°30′E
- Country: Russia
- Region: Volgograd Oblast
- District: Mikhaylovka Urban Okrug
- Time zone: UTC+4:00

Vesyoly (Russian: Веселый) is a rural locality (a khutor) in Mikhaylovka Urban Okrug, Volgograd Oblast, Russia. The population was 147 as of 2010. There are 3 streets.

== Geography ==
Vesyoly is located 60 km northeast of Mikhaylovka. 2-y Plotnikov is the nearest rural locality.
