= Razdory =

Razdory Раздоры
- Khutor
- Location within Volgograd Oblast Location within Russia
- Coordinates: 50°12′N 43°39′E
- Country: Russia
- Region: Volgograd Oblast
- District: Mikhaylovka Urban Okrug
- Time zone: UTC+4:00

Razdory (Russian: Раздоры) is a rural locality (a khutor) in Mikhaylovka Urban Okrug, Volgograd Oblast, Russia. The population was 329 as of 2010. There are 7 streets.

== Geography ==
Razdory is located 67 km northeast of Mikhaylovka. Kukushkino is the nearest rural locality.
