= Karagichevsky =

Karagichevsky Карагичевский
- Khutor
- Location within Volgograd Oblast Location within Russia
- Coordinates: 50°09′N 42°53′E
- Country: Russia
- Region: Volgograd Oblast
- District: Mikhaylovka Urban Okrug
- Time zone: UTC+4:00

Karagichevsky (Russian: Карагичевский) is a rural locality (a khutor) in Mikhaylovka Urban Okrug, Volgograd Oblast, Russia. The population was 1,331 as of 2010. There are 39 streets.

== Geography ==
Karagichevsky is located 36 km northwest of Mikhaylovka. Krutinsky is the nearest rural locality.
