= Archedinskaya =

Archedinskaya Арчединская
- Stanitsa
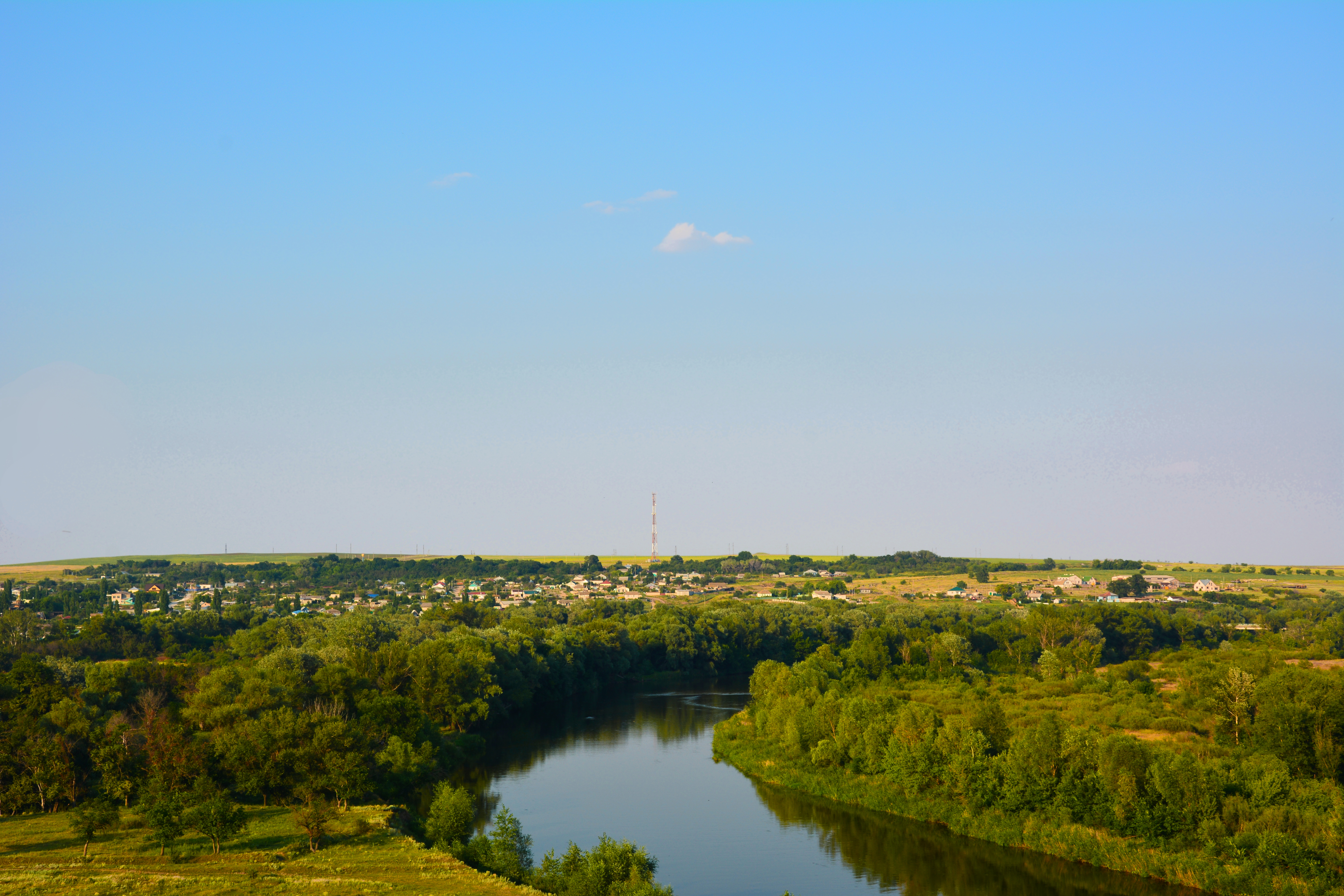

- Location within Volgograd Oblast Location within Russia
- Coordinates: 49°53′N 43°06′E
- Country: Russia
- Region: Volgograd Oblast
- District: Mikhaylovka Urban Okrug
- Time zone: UTC+4:00

Archedinskaya (Russian: Арчединская) is a rural locality (a stanitsa) in Mikhaylovka Urban Okrug, Volgograd Oblast, Russia. In 2010, the population was 1,344. There are 37 streets.

== Geography ==
Archedinskaya is located 28 km southwest of Mikhaylovka. Poddubny is the nearest rural locality.
