= Ilmensky 1-y =

Ilmensky 1-y Ильменский 1-й
- Khutor
- Location within Volgograd Oblast Location within Russia
- Coordinates: 49°58′N 43°07′E
- Country: Russia
- Region: Volgograd Oblast
- District: Mikhaylovka Urban Okrug
- Time zone: UTC+4:00

Ilmensky 1-y (Russian: Ильменский 1-й) is a rural locality (a khutor) in Mikhaylovka Urban Okrug, Volgograd Oblast, Russia. The population was 245 as of 2010. There are 19 streets.

== Geography ==
Ilmensky 1-y is located 20 km southwest of Mikhaylovka. Starorechensky is the nearest rural locality.
