= Maly Oreshkin =

Maly Oreshkin Малый Орешкин
- Khutor
- Location within Volgograd Oblast Location within Russia
- Coordinates: 50°10′N 43°23′E
- Country: Russia
- Region: Volgograd Oblast
- District: Mikhaylovka Urban Okrug
- Time zone: UTC+4:00

Maly Oreshkin (Russian: Малый Орешкин) is a rural locality (a khutor) in Mikhaylovka Urban Okrug, Volgograd Oblast, Russia. The population was 100 as of 2010. There are 8 streets.

== Geography ==
Maly Oreshkin is located 21 km northeast of Mikhaylovka. Mokhovsky is the nearest rural locality.
