= Kukushkino, Volgograd Oblast =

Rural locality in Mikhaylovka Urban Okrug

Kukushkino Кукушкино
- Khutor
- Location within Volgograd Oblast Location within Russia
- Coordinates: 50°11′N 43°39′E
- Country: Russia
- Region: Volgograd Oblast
- District: Mikhaylovka Urban Okrug
- Time zone: UTC+4:00

Kukushkino (Russian: Кукушкино) is a rural locality (a khutor) in Mikhaylovka Urban Okrug, Volgograd Oblast, Russia. The population was 39 as of 2010. There are 2 streets.

== Geography ==
Kukushkino is located 65 km northeast of Mikhaylovka. Razdory is the nearest rural locality.
