= Knyazhensky 1-y =

Knyazhensky 1-y Княженский 1-й
- Khutor
- Location within Volgograd Oblast Location within Russia
- Coordinates: 49°57′N 43°00′E
- Country: Russia
- Region: Volgograd Oblast
- District: Mikhaylovka Urban Okrug
- Time zone: UTC+4:00

Knyazhensky 1-y (Russian: Княженский 1-й) is a rural locality (a khutor) in Mikhaylovka Urban Okrug, Volgograd Oblast, Russia. The population was 188 as of 2010. There are 10 streets.

== Geography ==
Knyazhensky 1-y is located 24 km (15 mi) southwest of Mikhaylovka. Knyazhensky 2-y is the nearest rural locality.
