= Subbotin, Volgograd Oblast =

Subbotin Субботин
- Khutor
- Location within Volgograd Oblast Location within Russia
- Coordinates: 50°08′N 43°36′E
- Country: Russia
- Region: Volgograd Oblast
- District: Mikhaylovka Urban Okrug
- Time zone: UTC+4:00

Subbotin (Russian: Субботин) is a rural locality (a khutor) in Mikhaylovka Urban Okrug, Volgograd Oblast, Russia. The population was 263 as of 2010. There are 2 streets.

== Geography ==
Subbotin is located 61 km northeast of Mikhaylovka. Razdory is the nearest rural locality.
