= Starorechensky =

Starorechensky Старореченский
- Khutor
- Location within Volgograd Oblast Location within Russia
- Coordinates: 49°58′N 43°09′E
- Country: Russia
- Region: Volgograd Oblast
- District: Mikhaylovka Urban Okrug
- Time zone: UTC+4:00

Starorechensky (Russian: Старореченский) is a rural locality (a khutor) in Mikhaylovka Urban Okrug, Volgograd Oblast, Russia. The population was 181 as of 2010. There are 7 streets.

== Geography ==
Starorechensky is located 18 km southwest of Mikhaylovka. 1-y Ilmensky is the nearest rural locality.
