= Yeterevskaya =

Yeterevskaya Етеревская
- Stanitsa
- Location within Volgograd Oblast Location within Russia
- Coordinates: 50°11′N 43°32′E
- Country: Russia
- Region: Volgograd Oblast
- District: Mikhaylovka Urban Okrug
- Time zone: UTC+4:00

Yeterevskaya (Russian: Етеревская) is a rural locality (a stanitsa) in Mikhaylovka Urban Okrug, Volgograd Oblast, Russia. The population was 794 as of 2010. There are 18 streets.

== Geography ==
Yeterevskaya is located 39 km northeast of Mikhaylovka. 2-y Ilmensky is the nearest rural locality.
