= Poddubny, Volgograd Oblast =

Poddubny Поддубный
- Khutor
- Location within Volgograd Oblast Location within Russia
- Coordinates: 49°55′N 43°09′E
- Country: Russia
- Region: Volgograd Oblast
- District: Mikhaylovka Urban Okrug
- Time zone: UTC+4:00

Poddubny (Russian: Поддубный) is a rural locality (a khutor) in Mikhaylovka Urban Okrug, Volgograd Oblast, Russia. The population was 145 as of 2010. There are 5 streets.

== Geography ==
Poddubny is located 24 km southwest of Mikhaylovka. Archedinskaya is the nearest rural locality.
