= Mishin, Volgograd Oblast =

Mishin Мишин
- Khutor
- Location within Volgograd Oblast Location within Russia
- Coordinates: 50°21′N 43°31′E
- Country: Russia
- Region: Volgograd Oblast
- District: Mikhaylovka Urban Okrug
- Time zone: UTC+4:00

Mishin (Russian: Мишин) is a rural locality (a khutor) in Mikhaylovka Urban Okrug, Volgograd Oblast, Russia. The population was 211 as of 2010. There are 7 streets.

== Geography ==
Mishin is located 49 km northeast of Mikhaylovka. 2-y Plotnikov is the nearest rural locality.
