= Sukhov 2-y =

Sukhov 2-y Сухов 2-й
- Khutor
- Location within Volgograd Oblast Location within Russia
- Coordinates: 49°59′N 43°28′E
- Country: Russia
- Region: Volgograd Oblast
- District: Mikhaylovka Urban Okrug
- Time zone: UTC+4:00

Sukhov 2-y (Russian: Сухов 2-й) is a rural locality (a khutor) in Mikhaylovka Urban Okrug, Volgograd Oblast, Russia. The population was 1,379 as of 2010. There are 27 streets.

== Geography ==
Sukhov 2-y is located 36 km southeast of Mikhaylovka. Sukhov 1-y is the nearest rural locality.
