= Orly, Volgograd Oblast =

Orly Орлы
- Khutor
- Location within Volgograd Oblast Location within Russia
- Coordinates: 50°13′N 43°43′E
- Country: Russia
- Region: Volgograd Oblast
- District: Mikhaylovka Urban Okrug
- Time zone: UTC+4:00

Orly (Russian: Орлы) is a rural locality (a khutor) in Mikhaylovka Urban Okrug, Volgograd Oblast, Russia. The population was 324 as of 2010. There are 9 streets.

== Geography ==
Orly is located 50 km northeast of Mikhaylovka. Sergiyevskaya is the nearest rural locality.
