= Malomedvedevsky =

Malomedvedevsky Маломедведевский
- Khutor
- Location within Volgograd Oblast Location within Russia
- Coordinates: 50°16′N 43°11′E
- Country: Russia
- Region: Volgograd Oblast
- District: Mikhaylovka Urban Okrug
- Time zone: UTC+4:00

Malomedvedevsky (Russian: Маломедведевский) is a rural locality (a khutor) in Mikhaylovka Urban Okrug, Volgograd Oblast, Russia. The population was 30 as of 2010. There are 3 streets.

== Geography ==
Malomedvedevsky is located 48 km north of Mikhaylovka. Bolshemedvedevsky is the nearest rural locality.
