= Katasonov =

Katasonov Катасонов
- Khutor
- Location within Volgograd Oblast Location within Russia
- Coordinates: 50°05′N 43°00′E
- Country: Russia
- Region: Volgograd Oblast
- District: Mikhaylovka Urban Okrug
- Time zone: UTC+4:00

Katasonov (Russian: Катасонов) is a rural locality (a khutor) in Mikhaylovka Urban Okrug, Volgograd Oblast, Russia. The population was 456 as of 2010. There are 19 streets.

== Geography ==
Katasonov is located 19 km east of Mikhaylovka. Prudki is the nearest rural locality.
