= Burov, Volgograd Oblast =

Burov Буров
- Khutor
- Location within Volgograd Oblast Location within Russia
- Coordinates: 50°01′N 43°33′E
- Country: Russia
- Region: Volgograd Oblast
- District: Mikhaylovka Urban Okrug
- Time zone: UTC+4:00

Burov (Russian: Буров) is a rural locality (a khutor) in Mikhaylovka Urban Okrug, Volgograd Oblast, Russia. The population was 5 as of 2010.

== Geography ==
Burov is located 45 km southeast of Mikhaylovka. Cheremukhov is the nearest rural locality.
