= Rekonstruktsiya =

Rekonstruktsiya Реконструкция
- Settlement
- Location within Volgograd Oblast Location within Russia
- Coordinates: 50°15′N 43°04′E
- Country: Russia
- Region: Volgograd Oblast
- District: Mikhaylovka Urban Okrug
- Time zone: UTC+4:00

Rekonstruktsiya (Russian: Реконструкция) is a rural locality (a settlement) in Mikhaylovka Urban Okrug, Volgograd Oblast, Russia. The population was 1,272 as of 2010. There are 21 streets.

== Geography ==
Rekonstruktsiya is located 36 km northeast of Mikhaylovka. Troitsky is the nearest rural locality.
