= Bolshoy Oreshkin =

Bolshoy Oreshkin Большой Орешкин
- Khutor
- Location within Volgograd Oblast Location within Russia
- Coordinates: 50°09′N 43°22′E
- Country: Russia
- Region: Volgograd Oblast
- District: Mikhaylovka Urban Okrug
- Time zone: UTC+4:00

Bolshoy Oreshkin (Russian: Большой Орешкин) is a rural locality (a khutor) in Mikhaylovka Urban Okrug, Volgograd Oblast, Russia. The population was 243 as of 2010. There are 9 streets.

== Geography ==
Bolshoy Oreshkin is located 20 km northeast of Mikhaylovka. Maly Oreshkin is the nearest rural locality.
