= Zapolosny =

Zapolosny Заполосный
- Khutor
- Location within Volgograd Oblast Location within Russia
- Coordinates: 50°02′N 43°03′E
- Country: Russia
- Region: Volgograd Oblast
- District: Mikhaylovka Urban Okrug
- Time zone: UTC+4:00

Zapolosny (Russian: Заполосный) is a rural locality (a khutor) in Mikhaylovka Urban Okrug, Volgograd Oblast, Russia. The population was 13 as of 2010.

== Geography ==
Zapolosny is located 21 km west of Mikhaylovka. Otruba is the nearest rural locality.
