= Staroselye =

Staroselye may refer to:

- Staroselye (rural locality), name of several rural localities in Russia
- Staroselye Airport, an airport near Rybinsk, Yaroslavl Oblast, Russia

== See also ==
- Strashelye (Hasidic dynasty), a branch of the Chabad school of Hasidic Judaism
