= Krutinsky (rural locality) =

Krutinsky (Russian: Крутинский; masculine), Krutinskaya (Крутинская; feminine), or Krutinskoye (Крутинское; neuter) is the name of several inhabited rural localities (khutors, settlements, and villages) in Russia:

- Krutinsky, Rostov Oblast, a khutor in Gornyatskoye Rural Settlement of Belokalitvinsky District of Rostov Oblast
- Krutinsky, Volgograd Oblast, a khutor in Karagichevsky Selsoviet of Mikhaylovsky District of Volgograd Oblast
- Krutinsky, Voronezh Oblast, a settlement in Khorolskoye Rural Settlement of Talovsky District of Voronezh Oblast
- Krutinskaya, a village in Vagaysky Rural Okrug of Omutinsky District of Tyumen Oblast
