= Staroselye (rural locality) =

Staroselye (Russian: Староселье) is the name of several rural localities in Russia.

== Belgorod Oblast ==
As of 2010, one rural locality in Belgorod Oblast bears this name:

- Staroselye, Belgorod Oblast, a selo in Krasnoyaruzhsky District

== Bryansk Oblast ==
As of 2010, two rural localities in Bryansk Oblast bear this name:

- Staroselye, Bryansky District, Bryansk Oblast, a village in Otradnensky Selsoviet of Bryansky District
- Staroselye, Unechsky District, Bryansk Oblast, a selo in Staroselsky Selsoviet of Unechsky District

== Kaliningrad Oblast ==
As of 2010, one rural locality in Kaliningrad Oblast bears this name:

- Staroselye, Kaliningrad Oblast, a settlement in Gvardeysky Rural Okrug of Bagrationovsky District

== Kaluga Oblast ==
As of 2010, four rural localities in Kaluga Oblast bear this name:

- Staroselye, Kozelsky District, Kaluga Oblast, a village in Kozelsky District
- Staroselye, Maloyaroslavetsky District, Kaluga Oblast, a village in Maloyaroslavetsky District
- Staroselye, Meshchovsky District, Kaluga Oblast, a village in Meshchovsky District
- Staroselye, Sukhinichsky District, Kaluga Oblast, a village in Sukhinichsky District

== Leningrad Oblast ==
As of 2010, two rural localities in Leningrad Oblast bear this name:

- Staroselye, Tosnensky District, Leningrad Oblast, a village in Shapkinskoye Settlement Municipal Formation of Tosnensky District
- Staroselye, Vyborgsky District, Leningrad Oblast, a logging depot settlement in Krasnoselskoye Settlement Municipal Formation of Vyborgsky District

== Moscow Oblast ==
As of 2010, one rural locality in Moscow Oblast bears this name:

- Staroselye, Moscow Oblast, a village in Filimonkovskoye Rural Settlement of Leninsky District

== Nizhny Novgorod Oblast ==
As of 2010, one rural locality in Nizhny Novgorod Oblast bears this name:

- Staroselye, Nizhny Novgorod Oblast, a village in Dubravsky Selsoviet of Dalnekonstantinovsky District

== Novgorod Oblast ==
As of 2010, two rural localities in Novgorod Oblast bear this name:

- Staroselye, Borovichsky District, Novgorod Oblast, a village in Yegolskoye Settlement of Borovichsky District
- Staroselye, Pestovsky District, Novgorod Oblast, a village in Pestovskoye Settlement of Pestovsky District

== Pskov Oblast ==
As of 2010, eight rural localities in Pskov Oblast bear this name:

- Staroselye (Zhizhitskaya Rural Settlement), Kunyinsky District, Pskov Oblast, a village in Kunyinsky District; municipally, a part of Zhizhitskaya Rural Settlement of that district
- Staroselye (Kaskovskaya Rural Settlement), Kunyinsky District, Pskov Oblast, a village in Kunyinsky District; municipally, a part of Kaskovskaya Rural Settlement of that district
- Staroselye (Botalovskaya Rural Settlement), Kunyinsky District, Pskov Oblast, a village in Kunyinsky District; municipally, a part of Botalovskaya Rural Settlement of that district
- Staroselye, Loknyansky District, Pskov Oblast, a village in Loknyansky District
- Staroselye, Nevelsky District, Pskov Oblast, a village in Nevelsky District
- Staroselye, Novorzhevsky District, Pskov Oblast, a village in Novorzhevsky District
- Staroselye, Opochetsky District, Pskov Oblast, a village in Opochetsky District
- Staroselye, Palkinsky District, Pskov Oblast, a village in Palkinsky District

== Smolensk Oblast ==
As of 2010, ten rural localities in Smolensk Oblast bear this name:

- Staroselye, Dorogobuzhsky District, Smolensk Oblast, a village in Usvyatskoye Rural Settlement of Dorogobuzhsky District
- Staroselye, Dukhovshchinsky District, Smolensk Oblast, a village in Beresnevskoye Rural Settlement of Dukhovshchinsky District
- Staroselye, Gagarinsky District, Smolensk Oblast, a village in Karmanovskoye Rural Settlement of Gagarinsky District
- Staroselye, Kostyrevskoye Rural Settlement, Roslavlsky District, Smolensk Oblast, a village in Kostyrevskoye Rural Settlement of Roslavlsky District
- Staroselye, Prigoryevskoye Rural Settlement, Roslavlsky District, Smolensk Oblast, a village in Prigoryevskoye Rural Settlement of Roslavlsky District
- Staroselye, Ugransky District, Smolensk Oblast, a village in Slobodskoye Rural Settlement of Ugransky District
- Staroselye, Velizhsky District, Smolensk Oblast, a village in Zaozerskoye Rural Settlement of Velizhsky District
- Staroselye, Vyazemsky District, Smolensk Oblast, a village in Kasnyanskoye Rural Settlement of Vyazemsky District
- Staroselye, Miropolskoye Rural Settlement, Yartsevsky District, Smolensk Oblast, a village in Miropolskoye Rural Settlement of Yartsevsky District
- Staroselye, Podroshchinskoye Rural Settlement, Yartsevsky District, Smolensk Oblast, a village in Podroshchinskoye Rural Settlement of Yartsevsky District

== Tula Oblast ==
As of 2010, one rural locality in Tula Oblast bears this name:

- Staroselye, Tula Oblast, a village in Ivanovsky Rural Okrug of Belyovsky District

== Tver Oblast ==
As of 2010, nine rural localities in Tver Oblast bear this name:

- Staroselye, Bezhetsky District, Tver Oblast, a village in Bezhetsky District
- Staroselye, Kalininsky District, Tver Oblast, a village in Kalininsky District
- Staroselye, Kashinsky District, Tver Oblast, a village in Kashinsky District
- Staroselye (Vysokinskoye Rural Settlement), Nelidovsky District, Tver Oblast, a village in Nelidovsky District; municipally, a part of Vysokinskoye Rural Settlement of that district
- Staroselye (Novoselkovskoye Rural Settlement), Nelidovsky District, Tver Oblast, a village in Nelidovsky District; municipally, a part of Novoselkovskoye Rural Settlement of that district
- Staroselye, Oleninsky District, Tver Oblast, a village in Oleninsky District
- Staroselye (Kurovskoye Rural Settlement), Udomelsky District, Tver Oblast, a village in Udomelsky District; municipally, a part of Kurovskoye Rural Settlement of that district
- Staroselye (Kotlovanskoye Rural Settlement), Udomelsky District, Tver Oblast, a village in Udomelsky District; municipally, a part of Kotlovanskoye Rural Settlement of that district
- Staroselye, Zapadnodvinsky District, Tver Oblast, a village in Zapadnodvinsky District

== Volgograd Oblast ==
As of 2010, one rural locality in Volgograd Oblast bears this name:

- Staroselye, Volgograd Oblast, a selo in Bezymyansky Selsoviet of Mikhaylovsky District

== Yaroslavl Oblast ==
As of 2010, three rural localities in Yaroslavl Oblast bear this name:

- Staroselye, Borisoglebsky District, Yaroslavl Oblast, a village in Shchurovsky Rural Okrug of Borisoglebsky District
- Staroselye (settlement), Rybinsky District, Yaroslavl Oblast, a settlement in Nazarovsky Rural Okrug of Rybinsky District
- Staroselye (village), Rybinsky District, Yaroslavl Oblast, a village in Nazarovsky Rural Okrug of Rybinsky District
