= Krutinsky =

Krutinsky (masculine), Krutinskaya (feminine), or Krutinskoye (neuter) may refer to:

- Krutinsky District, a district of Omsk Oblast, Russia
- Krutinsky (rural locality) (Krutinskaya, Krutinskoye), name of several rural localities in Russia
