= Cottage =

Dwelling type

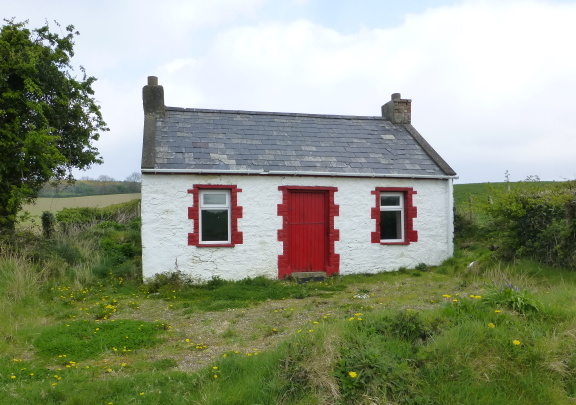
A cottage on Inch Island, Ireland

A cottage during England's feudal period was the holding by a cottager (known as a cotter or bordar) of a small house with enough garden to feed a family and in return for the cottage, the cottager had to provide some form of service to the manorial lord. However, in time cottage just became the general term for a small house. In modern usage, a cottage is usually a modest, often cosy dwelling, typically in a rural or semi-rural location and not necessarily in England. The cottage orné, often quite large and grand residences built by the nobility, dates back to a movement of "rustic" stylised cottages of the late 18th and early 19th century during the Romantic movement.

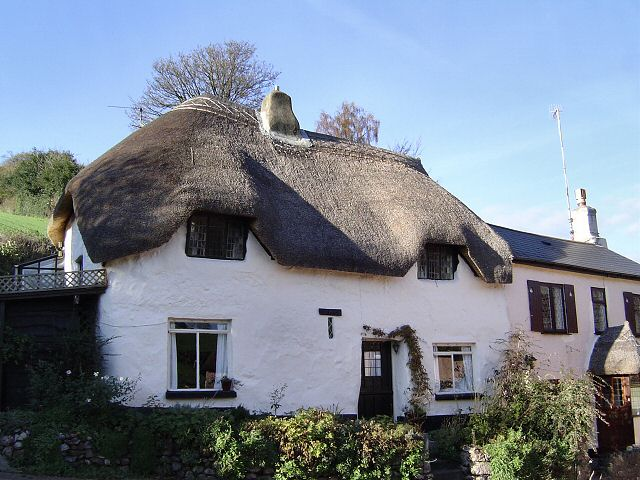
A typical cottage in Devon, with walls built of cob and a thatched roof

In British English the term now denotes a small, cosy dwelling of traditional build, although it can also be applied to modern construction designed to resemble traditional houses ("mock cottages"). Cottages may be detached houses, or terraced, such as those built to house workers in mining villages. The tied accommodation provided to farm workers was usually a cottage, see cottage garden. In England the term holiday cottage now denotes a specialised form of residential let property, attracting various tax benefits to the owner.

The holiday cottage exists in many cultures under different names. In Canadian English and American English, "cottage" is one term for such holiday homes, although they may also be called a "cabin", "chalet", or even "camp". In Australia, the term "cabin" is common, cottage usually referring to a smaller pre-modern period dwelling. In certain countries (e.g. Nordics, Baltics, and Russia) the term "cottage" has local synonyms: In Finnish mökki, in Estonian suvila, in Latvian vasarnīca, in Livonian sõvvõkuodā, in Swedish stuga, in Norwegian hytte (from the German word Hütte), in Czech or Slovak chata or chalupa, in Russian дача (dacha).

In places such as Canada, "cottage" carries no connotations of size (compare with vicarage or hermitage).

== Etymology ==
The word cottage (Medieval Latin cotagium) derives from Old English cot, cote "hut" and Old French cot "hut, cottage", from Old Norse kot "hut" and related to Middle Low German kotten (cottage, hut). Examples of this may be found in 15th century manor court rolls. The house of the cottage bore the Latin name: "domus", while the barn of the cottage was termed "grangia".

== England ==
=== Medieval ===
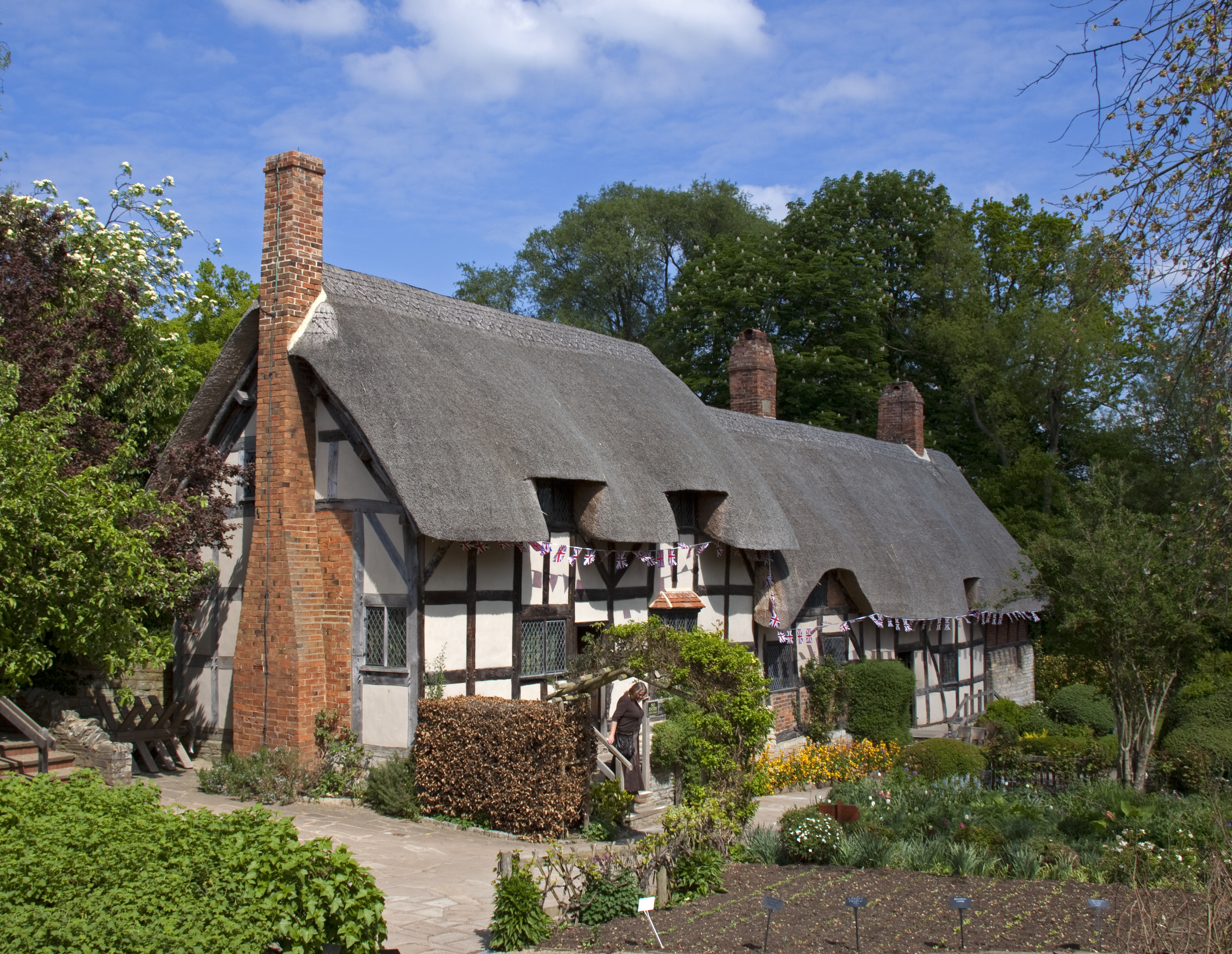
Anne Hathaway's Cottage, Shottery, Warwickshire

The word originally referred to a humble rural detached dwelling of a cotter, a semi-independent resident of a manor who had certain residential rights from the lord of the manor, and who in the social hierarchy was a grade above the slave (mentioned in the Domesday Book of 1086), who had no right of tenure and worked full-time to the orders of the lord. In the Domesday Book, they were referred to as Coterelli. The cottage had a small amount of surrounding agricultural land, perhaps two or three acres, from which the resident gained his livelihood and sustenance. It was defined by its function of housing a cotter, rather than by its form, which varied, but it was certainly small and cheaply built and purely functional, with no non-essential architectural flourishes. It would have been built from the cheapest locally available materials and in the local style, thus in wheat-growing areas, it would be roofed in thatch, and in slate-rich locations, such as Cornwall, slates would be used for roofing. In stone-rich areas, its walls would be built of rubble stone, and in other areas, such as Devon, was commonly built from cob.

=== Industrial Revolution ===
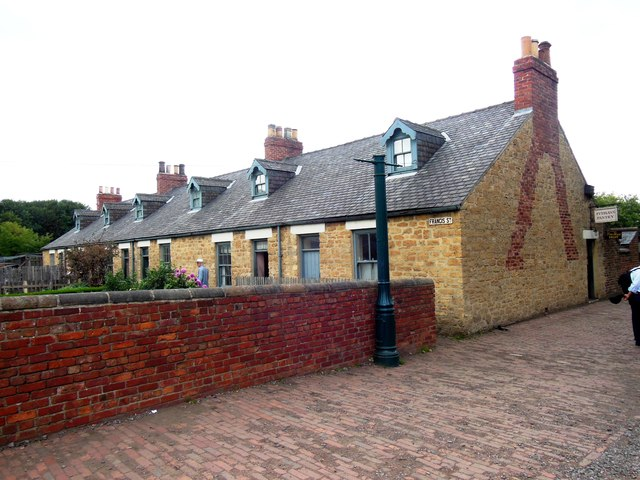
19th century coal miners' cottages rebuilt at the Beamish Museum

In England from about the 18th century onwards, the development of industry led to the development of weavers' cottages and miners' cottages. Friedrich Engels cites 'Cottages' as a poor quality dwelling in his 1845 work The Condition of the Working Class in England.

=== Enclosure acts ===
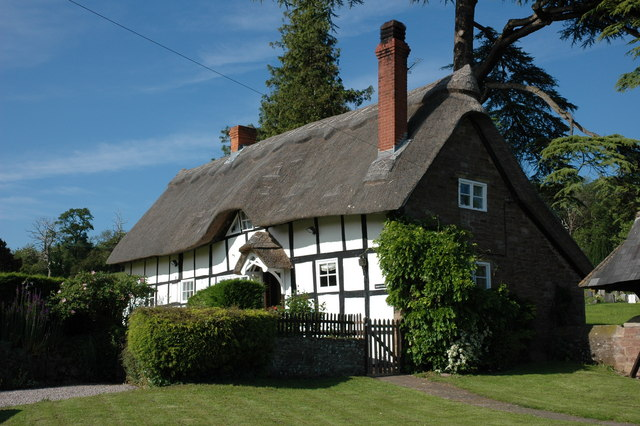
Church Cottage, Stretton Grandison, Herefordshire

Over the years various English acts of Parliament removed the right of the cottager to hold land. According to John Lawrence Hammond and Barbara Hammond in their book The Village Labourer, before an inclosure act a cottager was a farm labourer with land, and after an inclosure act the cottager was a farm labourer without land.

=== Legal definition ===
In the law of England and Wales the definition of a cottage is "a small house or habitation without land". However, originally under an Elizabethan statute, the cottage had to be built with at least 4 acres (0.02 km^{2}; 0.01 sq mi) of land.

== Wales ==
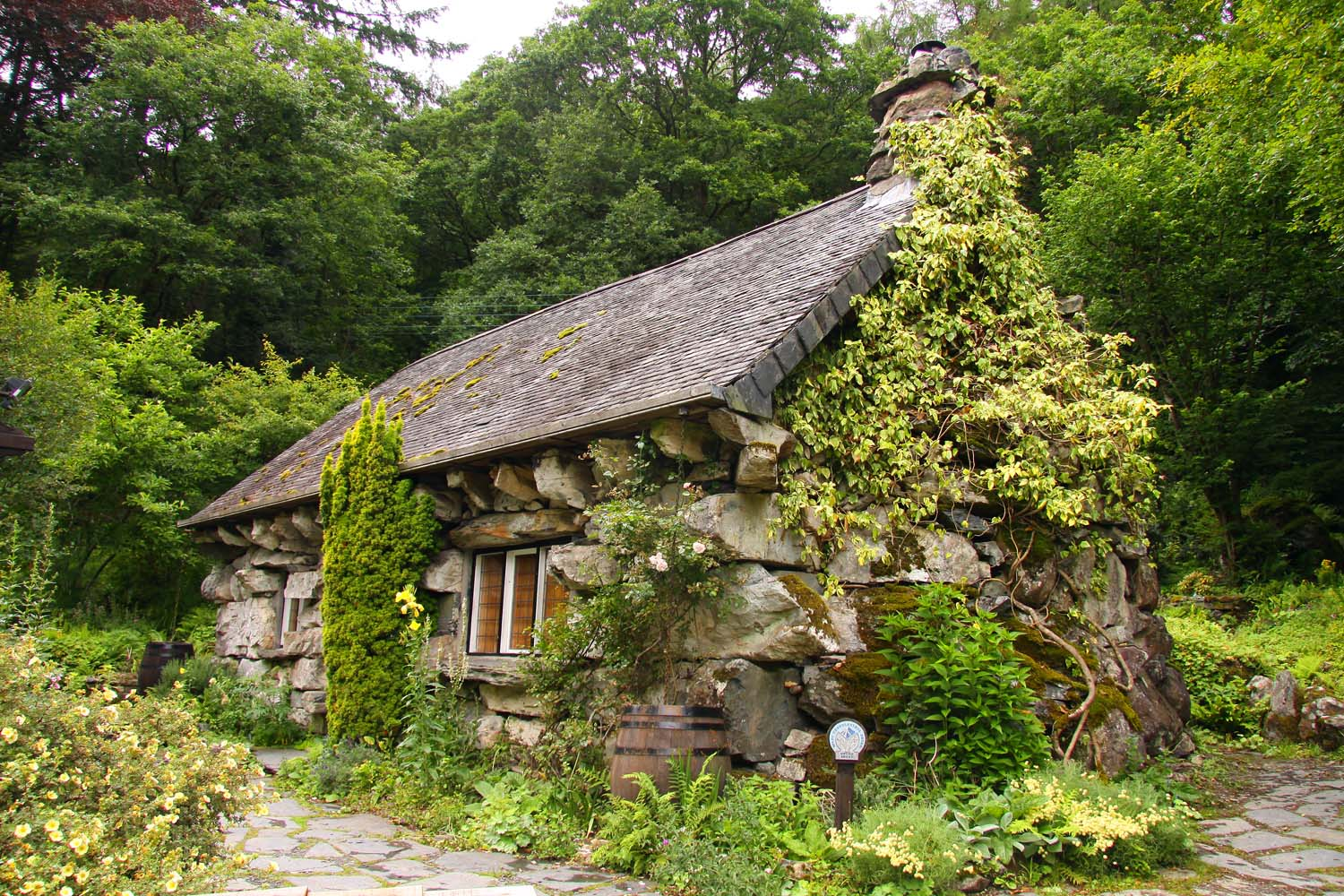
The Ugly House (Welsh: Tŷ Hyll) near Betws-Y-Coed, a famous example of a tŷ unnos

The Welsh Tŷ unnos or "house in a night", was built by squatters on a plot of land defined by the throw of an axe from each corner of the property. In Welsh a cottage is known as bwthyn and its inhabitant preswlydd.

== Scotland ==
In Scotland the equivalent to cottager would be the crofter and the term for the building and its land would be croft.

== Ireland ==
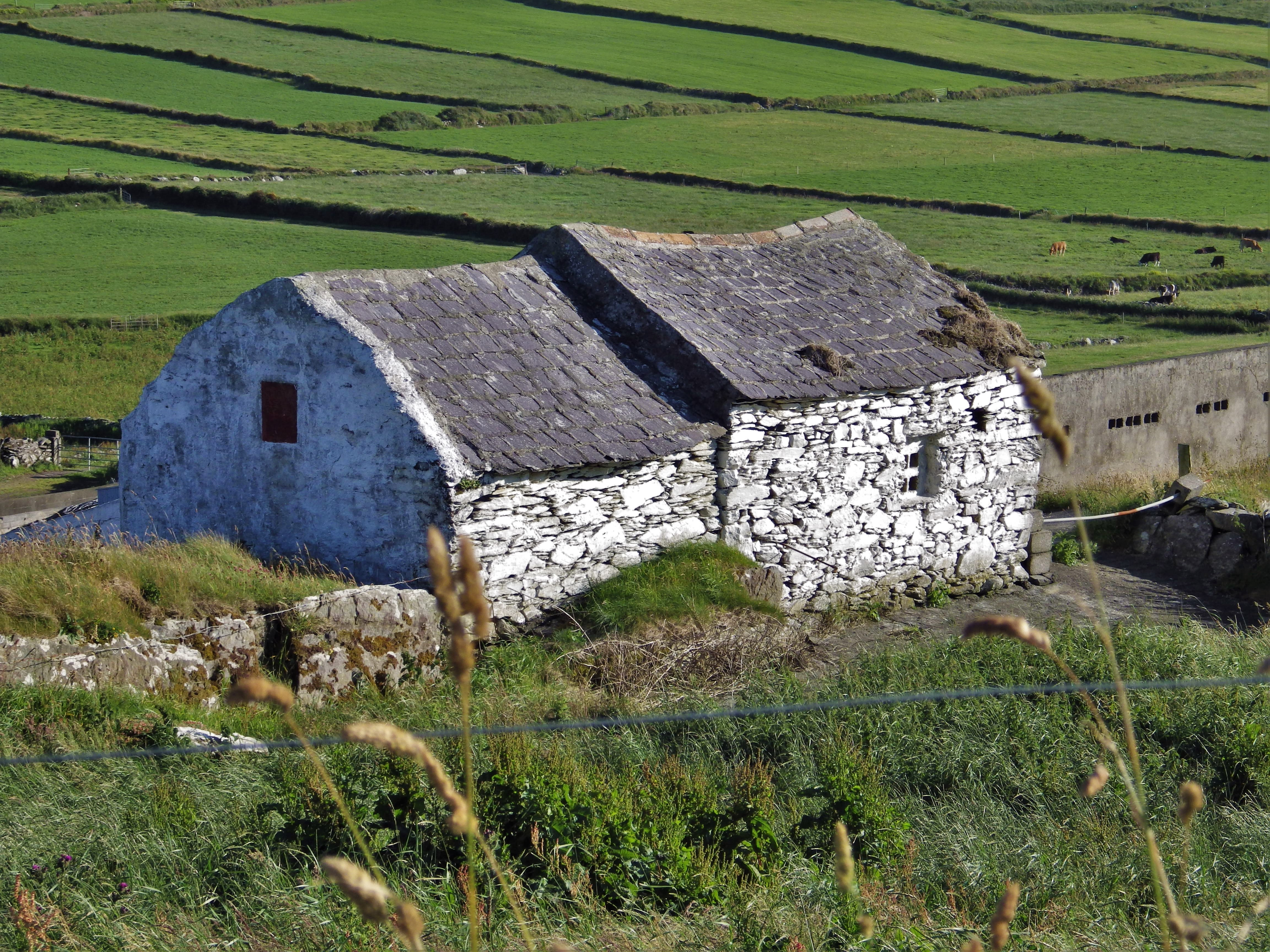
A common sight in the west of Ireland – a 19th-century stone teachín – in Carrigmanus, County Cork

Irish cottages, known as Irish: teachín, were historically the homes of farmworkers and labourers, but in recent years the term has assumed a romantic connotation especially when referring to cottages with thatched roofs (Irish: teach ceann tuí). These thatched cottages were once to be seen all over Ireland, but most have become dilapidated due to newer and modern developments. However, there has been a recent revival of restoring these old cottages, with people wanting a more traditional home. Today, thatched cottages are now mostly built for the tourist industry and many can be let out as accommodation.

== Modern usage in Britain and Ireland ==
In popular modern culture, the term cottage is used in a more general and romantic context and can date from any era but the term is usually applied to pre-modern dwellings. Older, pre-Victorian cottages tend to have restricted height, and often have construction timber exposed, sometimes intruding into the living space. Modern renovations of such dwellings often seek to re-expose timber purlins, rafters, posts, etc. which have been covered, in an attempt to establish perceived historical authenticity.

Older cottages are typically modest, often semi-detached or terraced, with only four basic rooms ("two up, two down"), although subsequent modifications can create more spacious accommodation. A labourer's or fisherman's one-roomed house, often attached to a larger property, is a particular type of cottage and is called a penty. The term cottage has also been used for a larger house that is practical rather than pretentious: see Chawton Cottage.

== Outside Britain and Ireland ==
=== North America ===
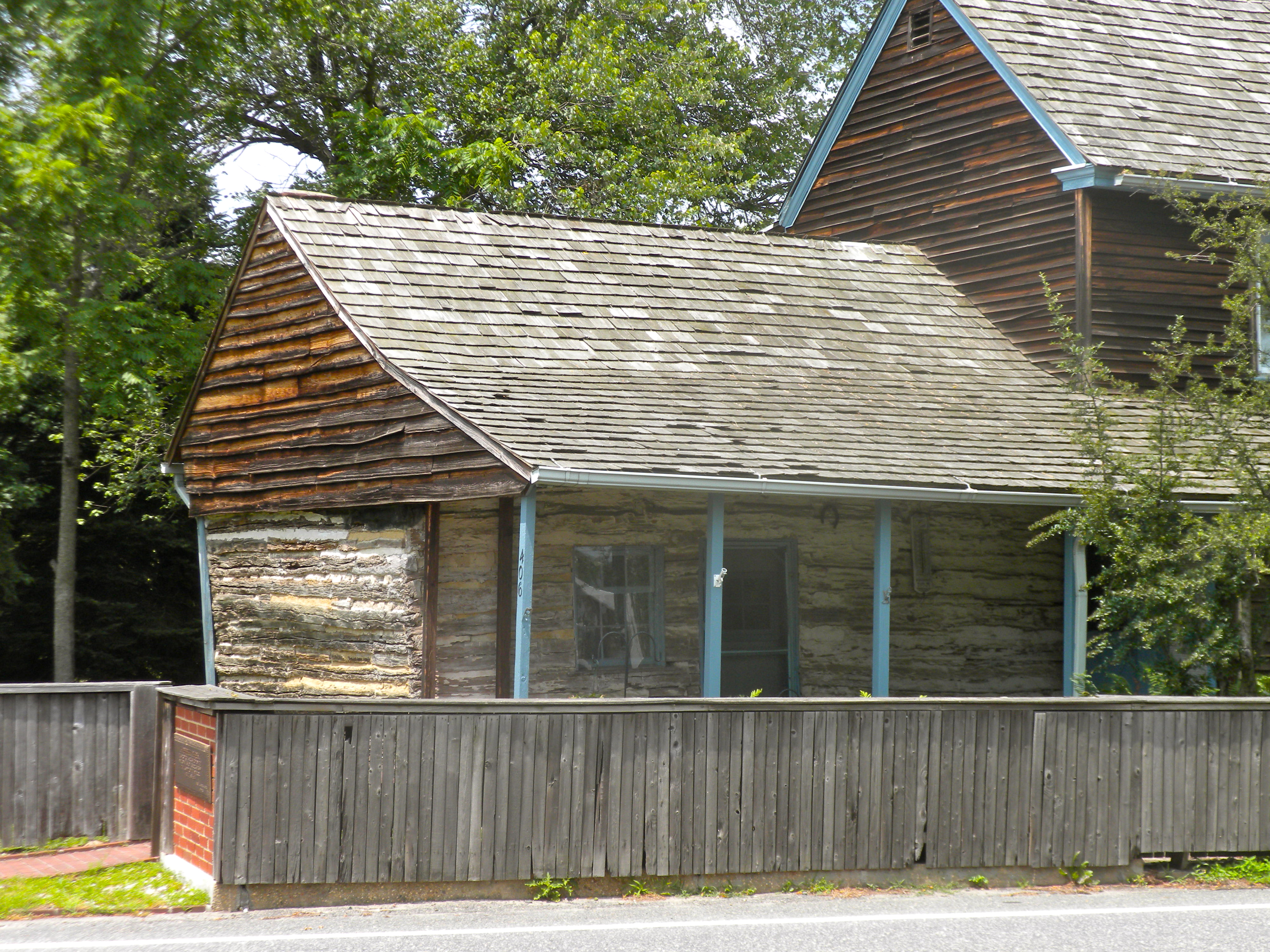
Cottage built c. 1640, near Swedesboro, New Jersey

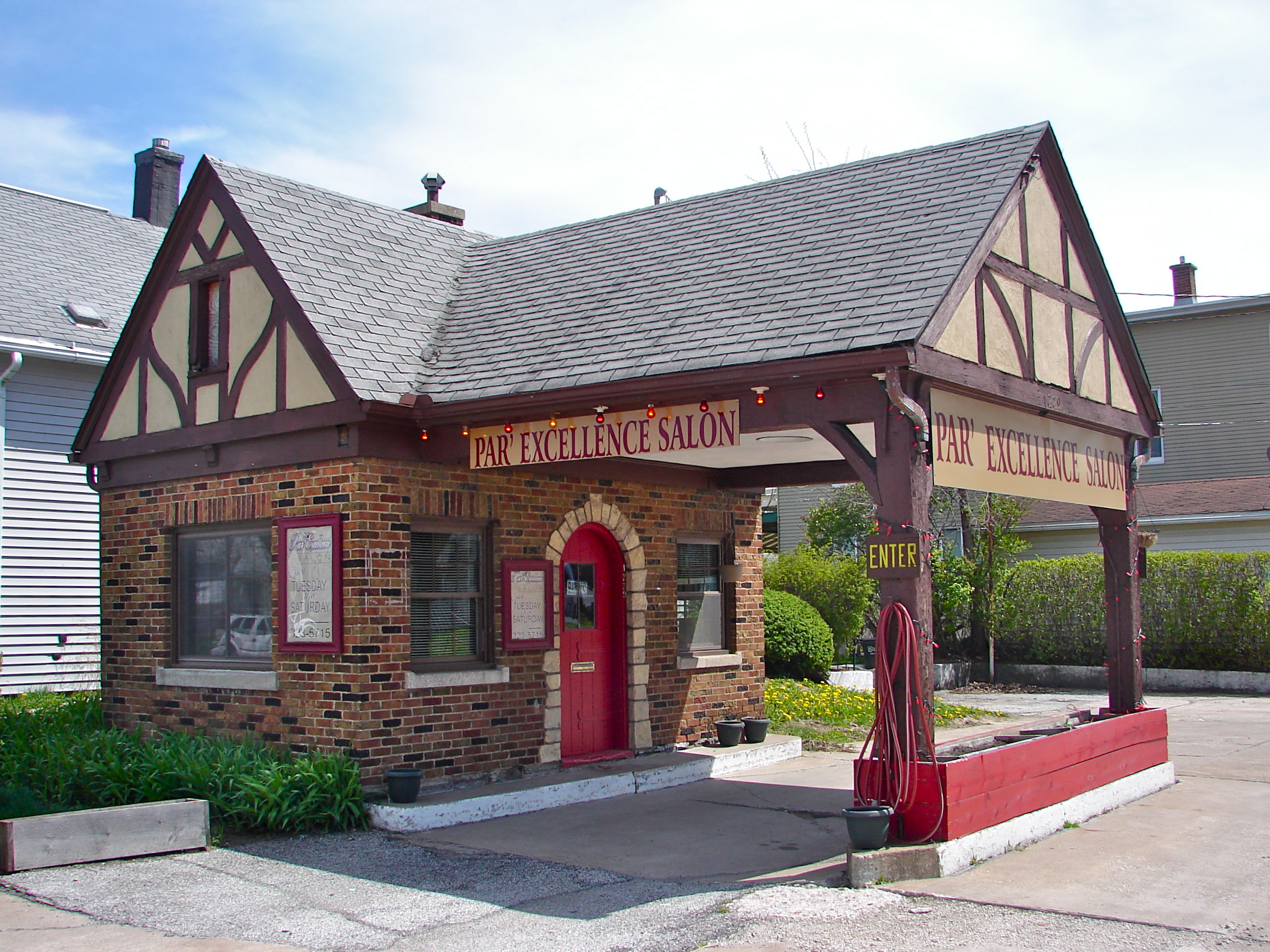
Wolters Filling Station in Davenport, Iowa; an example of an English Cottage-style gas station

Although the Oxford English Dictionary states that the term cottage is used in North America to represent "a summer residence (often on a large and sumptuous scale) at a watering-place or a health or pleasure resort," most Americans expect a cottage, particularly a summer cottage, to be a relatively small, possibly unfinished house. Various editions of the quintessentially American Webster's Dictionary define it as "a small house; any modest country or suburban dwelling," (fifth edition) with the eleventh edition describing even a vacation cottage as "a usu. small house for vacation use."

In North America, most buildings known as cottages are used for weekend or summer getaways by city dwellers. Cottage owners often rent their properties to tourists as a source of revenue. In Saint John, U.S. Virgin Islands, most cottages are vacation rentals used for weekend or summer getaways. In Michigan, a cottage normally means a summer residence farther north near or on a lake. An example of a colonial era cottage in North America is a small fieldstone house called Boelson Cottage in Fairmount Park, Philadelphia—one of the oldest extant houses within the city (c.1678–84).

In the jargon of English-speaking Quebec's real-estate industry, a cottage is any two-storey house, as opposed to a bungalow. However, "cottages" in Eastern Canada are generally located next to lakes, rivers, or the ocean in forested areas. They are used as a place to spend holidays with friends and family; common activities include swimming, canoeing, waterskiing, fishing, hiking, and sailing. There are also many well-known summer colonies. Cottage living is one of the most popular tourist draws in Ontario, Canada, parts of which have come to be known as cottage country. This term typically refers to the north and south shores of Georgian Bay, Ontario; Muskoka, Ontario; Haliburton, Ontario; and the Kawartha Lakes, Ontario; but has also been used to describe several other Canadian regions. The practice of renting cottages has become widespread in these regions, especially with rising property taxes for waterfront property.

What Eastern Canadians refer to as "cottages" (seasonal-use dwellings), are generally referred to as "cabins" in most of North America. This is most notable in the Midwest and the Western United States, and Western Canada. In much of Northern Ontario, New England, and upstate New York, a summer house near a body of water is known as a camp. In the 1960s and 1970s, the A-Frame house became a popular cottage style in North America.

In the 1920s and 30s many gas stations were built in the style of Old World cottages. Comprising about a third of the stations built in the United States in those years, cottage-patterned facilities evoked a picturesque homeyness and were easier to gain approval for than the more stylized or attention-grabbing designs also commonly used at the dawn of the automobile era.

=== Australia ===
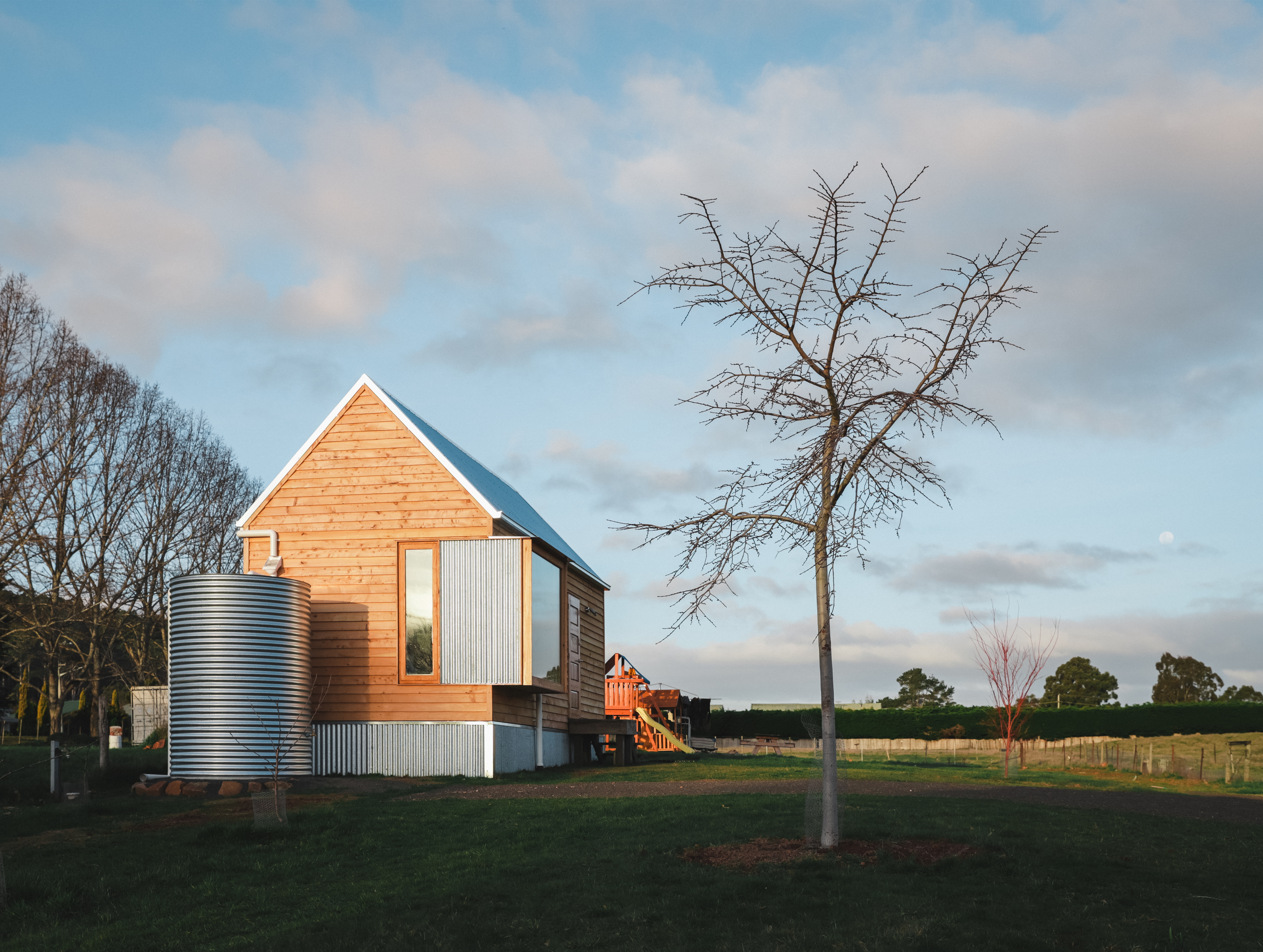
A contemporary Australian cabin (cottage)

In Australia, the term "cabin" or "shack" is commonly used for a small dwelling, the former more often for a place of residence or tourist accommodation and the latter for a simple recreational shelter, typically not continuously occupied. The term cottage usually refers to historic smaller residential buildings, commonly stone or brick, typically from Georgian or Victorian. More recently, cabins are often also referred to tiny houses, however, cabins are built at a permanent site on proper footings, while the term tiny house often implies that the dwelling is built on a trailer platform and can be relocated.

=== Nordic countries ===
==== Finland ====
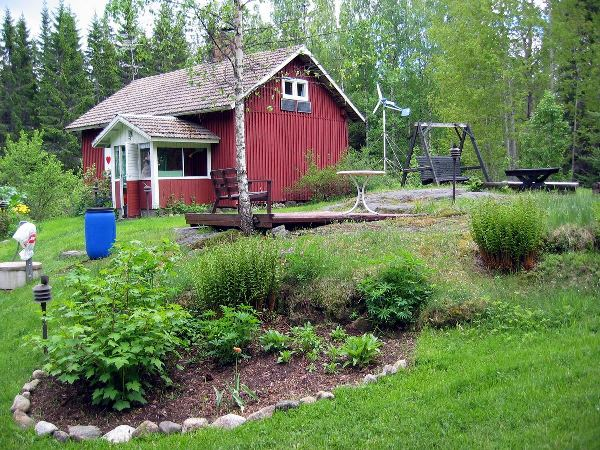
A cottage in Vihti, southern Finland

Statistics Finland defines a cottage (Finnish: mökki, Finland Swedish: stuga or villa) as "a residential building that is used as a holiday or free-time dwelling and is permanently constructed or erected on its site". Finnish cottages are traditionally built of logs but other wood constructions have become common. They are usually situated close to water and almost all have a sauna.

There are 474,277 cottages in Finland (2005), a country with 187,888 lakes and 179,584 islands, including rental holiday cottages owned by hospitality companies but excluding holiday villages and buildings on garden allotments. Reports have 4,172 new cottages built in 2005. Most cottages are situated in the municipalities of Kuusamo (6,196 cottages on 1 January 2006), Kuopio (5,194), Ekenäs (Tammisaari – 5,053), Mikkeli (4,649), and Mäntyharju (4,630).

==== Sweden ====
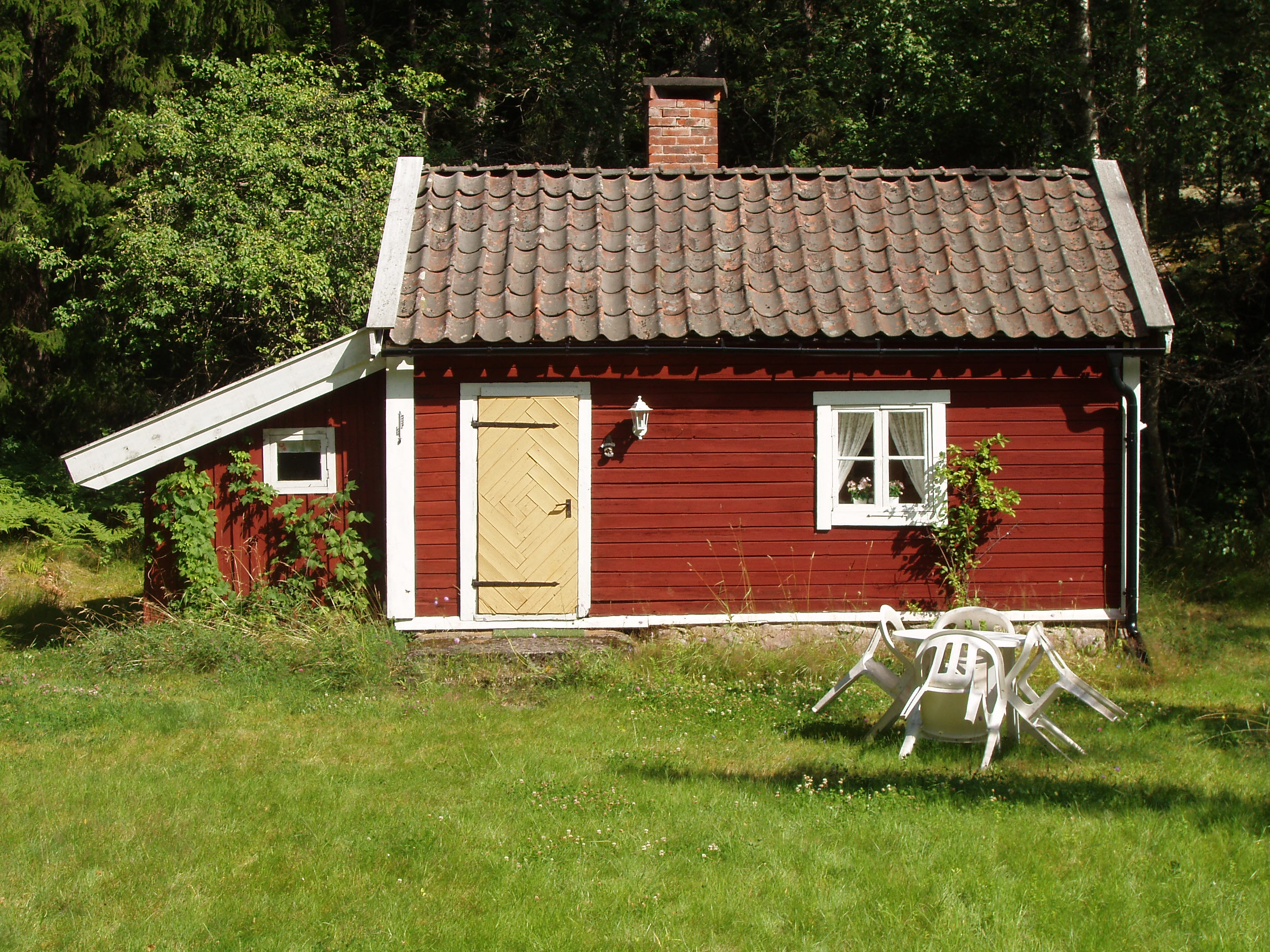
Swedish cottage in Ljusterö, Stockholm

The formal Swedish term for cottages is fritidshus (vacation house) or stuga, of which there are 680.000 in Sweden (2007). According to Statistics Sweden, about 50% of the Swedish population has access to a vacation house. In everyday talk, Swedes refer to their cottages as lantstället (the country house) or stugan (the cottage). Most vacation houses in Sweden are to be found along the coasts and around the major cities. Prices vary a lot depending on location; a modern seaside house near Stockholm may cost 100 times as much as a simple cottage in the inner regions of northern Sweden.

Until the end of World War II, only a small wealthy Swedish elite could afford vacation houses—often both a large seaside house and a hunting cabin up north. During the rapid urbanisation in the 1950s and 1960s, many families were able to retain their old farmhouses, village cottages, and fisherman cabins and convert them into vacation houses. In addition, economic growth made it possible even for low-income families to buy small lots in the countryside where they could erect simple houses. Former vacation houses near the large cities have gradually been converted into permanent homes as a result of urban sprawl.

The traditional Swedish cottage is a simple paneled house made of wood and painted in red. They may contain 1–3 small bedrooms and also a small bathroom. In the combined kitchen and living room (storstuga) there is usually a fireplace. Today, many cottages have been extended with "outdoor rooms" (semi-heated external rooms with glass walls and a thin roof) and large wood terraces. As a result of the friggebod reform in 1979, many cottage owners have built additional guesthouses on their lots.

==== Norway ====
The formal Norwegian term for cottages is hytte or fritidsbolig (vacation house). In Norway, cabins are often built near leisure activities such as hunting, fishing, and outdoor life / outdoor sports, or in areas with particularly beautiful nature, such as in the woods, in the mountains, or by the sea. In the most attractive areas, it has become increasingly common with regulated fields where the cabins are very close together, in so-called "cabin villages". Chained cabins and holiday apartments are also being built here, similar to a normal city.

=== Russia ===
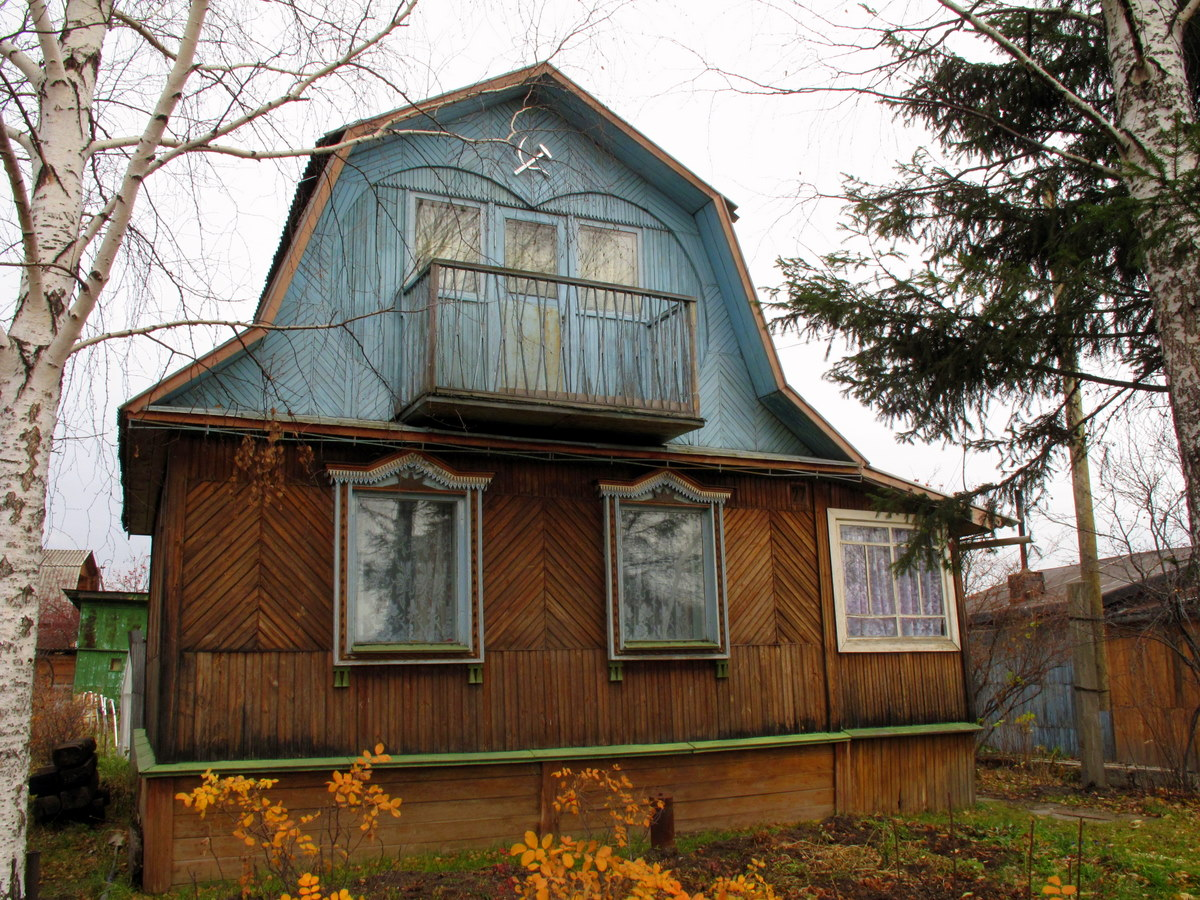
A typical Soviet dacha (summer house) in Resheti

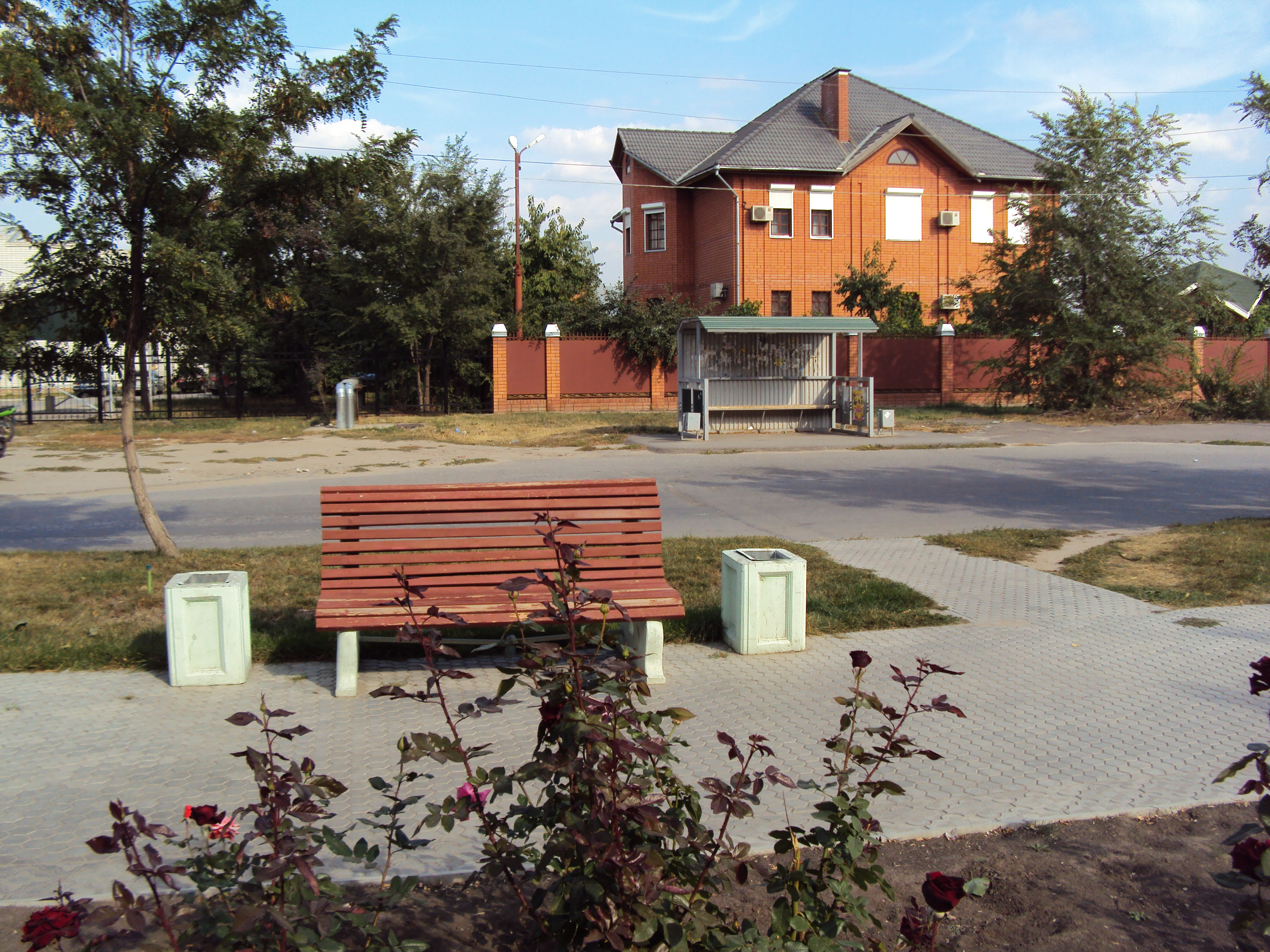
Example of what now is called "a cottage" in Russia (Mikhaylovka, Volgograd Oblast)

The first known "cottages" were built in Russia in the 19th century, when British culture was popular. Today many large cities in Russia are surrounded by cottage villages. So it is legitimate to talk about the appearance of the term "Russian cottage" – a house, comparable in size to a British villa or even a mansion, and includes a corresponding piece of land.

=== South Africa ===
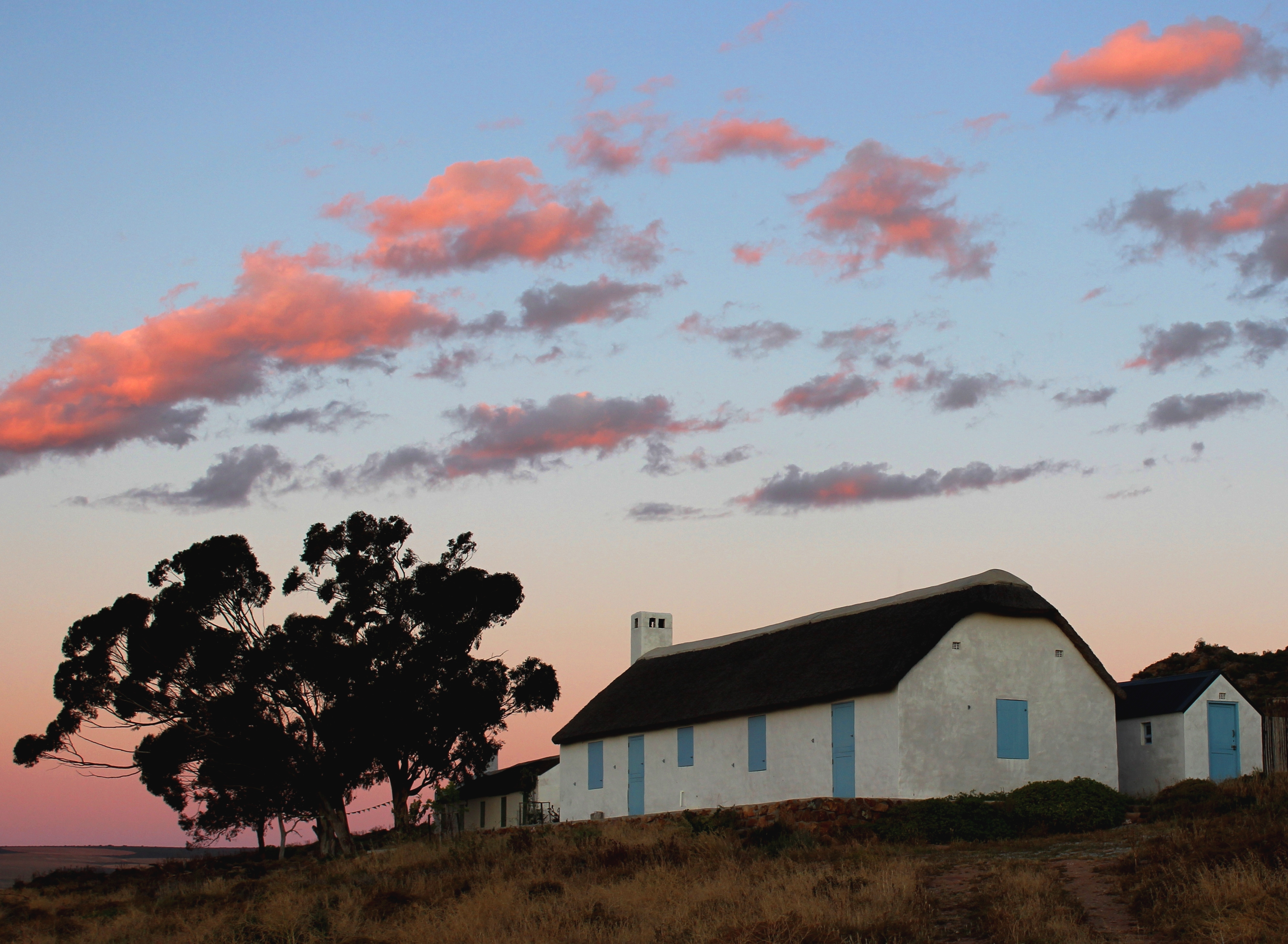
A traditional 'langhuis' (long cottage) cottage in Verloren Vlei Heritage Village in the Western Cape region of South Africa

Much like in the rest of the world, cottages in South Africa housed agricultural workers and their friends and families. A number of cottages were also constructed for fishermen along the West and South Coasts of the country throughout the 18th and 19th centuries. Most cottages are single-story two to four-room structures, sometimes with an attic for storing supplies. Most cottages in the Western Cape area of South Africa have thatched roofs and stone or adobe walls which were traditionally whitewashed. A large number of the remaining cottages in the country are listed heritage sites.

== Notable cottages ==
- Andrew Carnegie Birthplace Museum, Fife, Scotland – weaver's cottage, birthplace of industrialist and philanthropist Andrew Carnegie
- Anne Hathaway's Cottage, Warwickshire, England – childhood home of Anne Hathaway (wife of Shakespeare)
- Arthur Cottage, County Antrim, Northern Ireland – the ancestral home of US President Chester A. Arthur
- Bishop Asbury Cottage, Staffordshire, England – boyhood home of Methodist Episcopal Bishop Francis Asbury
- Bron-Yr-Aur, Powys, Wales – holiday cottage used by rock band Led Zeppelin
- Burns Cottage, Ayrshire, Scotland – home of poet Robert Burns
- Cooks' Cottage, Melbourne, Australia – taken from Yorkshire to Victoria in 1934
- Clouds Hill, Dorset, England – home of soldier T. E. Lawrence, ("Lawrence of Arabia")
- Dove Cottage, Cumbria, England – home of the poet William Wordsworth and his sister Dorothy Wordsworth
- Elgar Birthplace Museum, Worcestershire, England – cottage birthplace of composer Edward Elgar
- Ernest Hemingway Cottage, Michigan, USA – boyhood summer home of author Ernest Hemingway
- Herbert Hoover National Historic Site, Iowa, USA – cottage birthplace of President Herbert Hoover
- Hill Top, Cumbria, England – home of children's author Beatrix Potter
- Ivy Green, Alabama, USA – birthplace of deaf-blind author Helen Keller
- La Trobe's Cottage, Melbourne, Australia – home of Charles La Trobe, founder of the colony of Victoria
- Michael Collins Birthplace, County Cork, Ireland – cottage birthplace of Irish revolutionary leader Michael Collins
- Oakhurst Cottage, Surrey, England – preserved 17th century agricultural worker's cottage
- Swiss Cottage, Cahir, County Tipperary, Ireland – ornamental cottage designed by John Nash
- Thomas Hardy's Cottage, Dorset, England – home of author Thomas Hardy
- Willy Lott's Cottage, Suffolk, England – featured in several paintings by John Constable
- York Cottage, Norfolk, England – favourite home of King George V and Mary of Teck

== Gallery ==
=== Thatched cottages in England ===
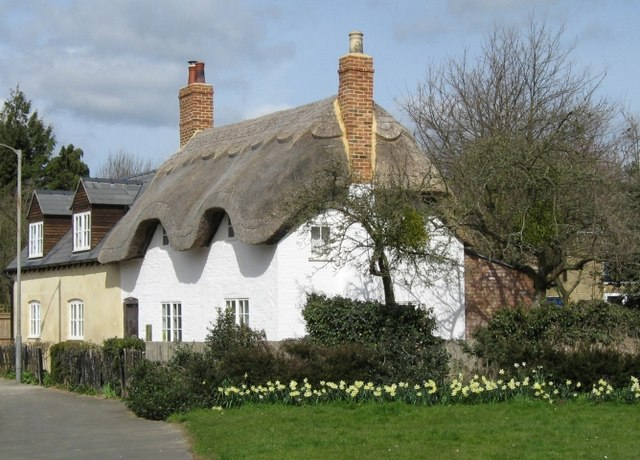
Cottage with thatched roof, Simpson, Milton Keynes

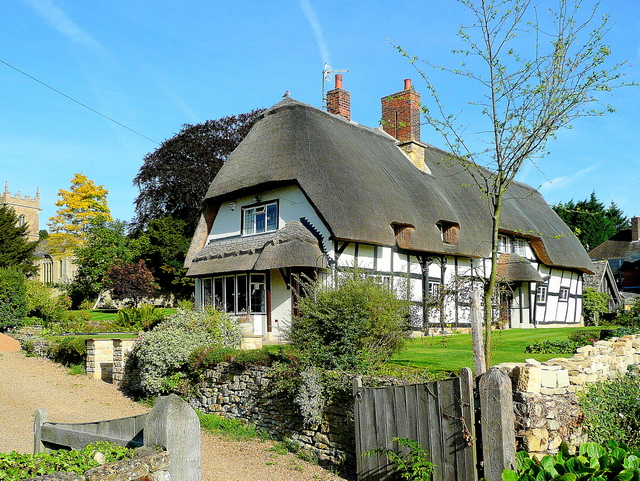
Ashton under Hill, Worcestershire

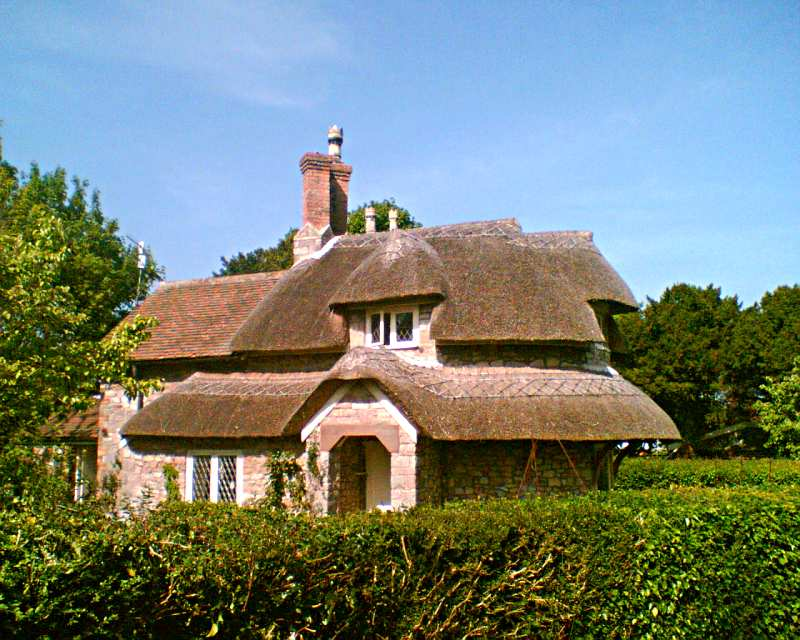
Cottage designed by John Nash at Blaise Hamlet, Bristol

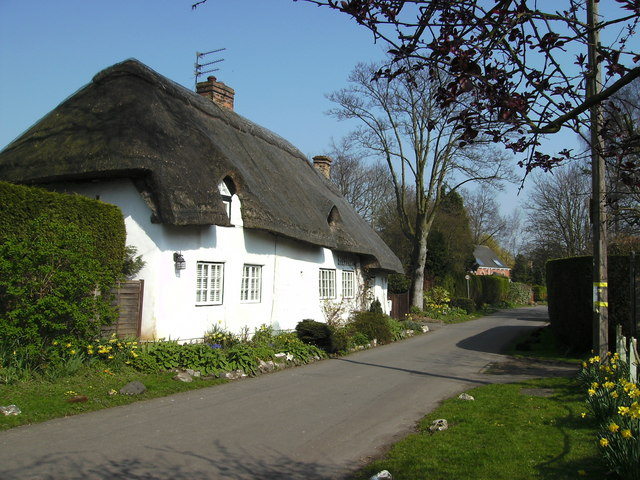
Thatched cottage, Brigsley, Lincolnshire

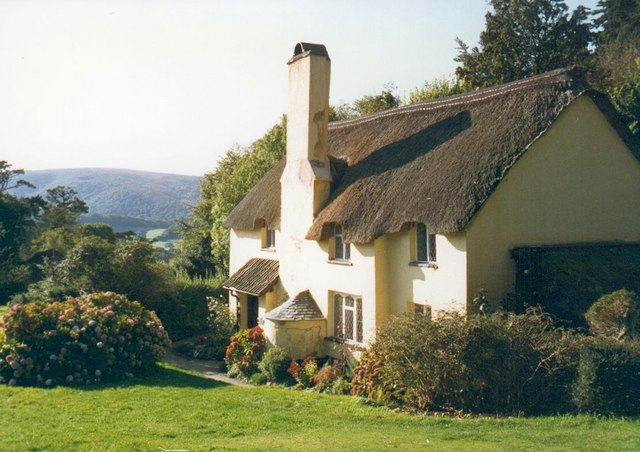
Cottage, Selworthy, Somerset

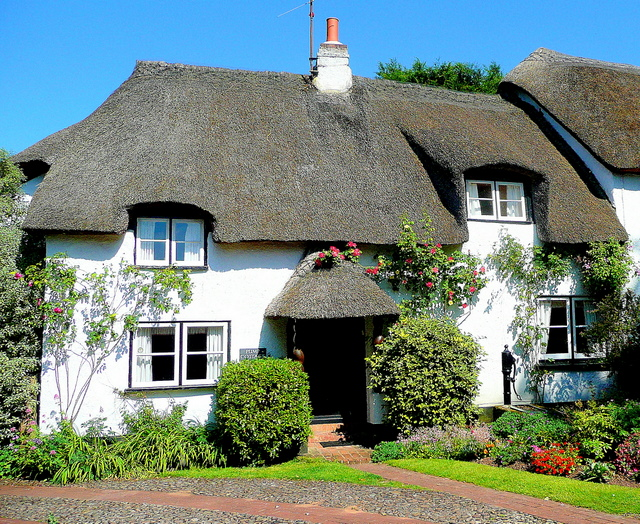
Pump Cottage, Harpford, Devon

=== Other cottages ===
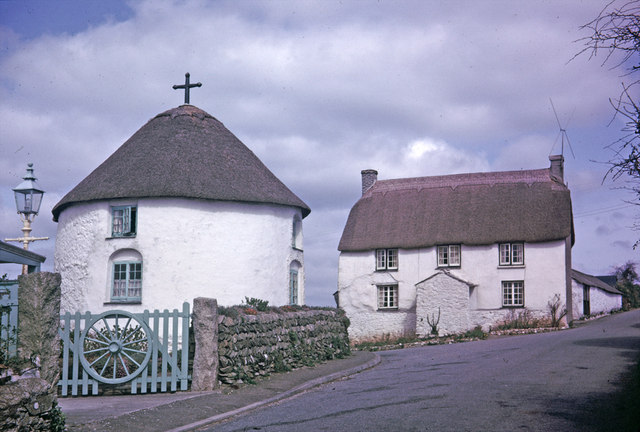
Circular cottage in Veryan, Cornwall

Cottage amongst sand dunes in Denmark

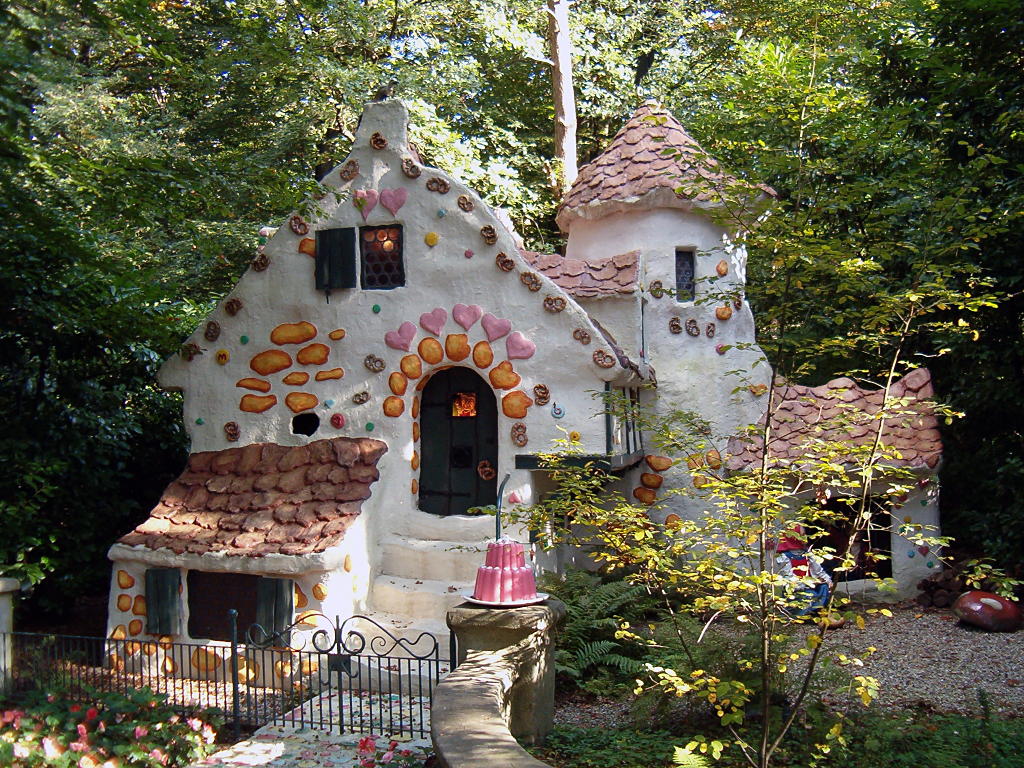
The Hansel and Gretel cottage at the Efteling theme park, the Netherlands

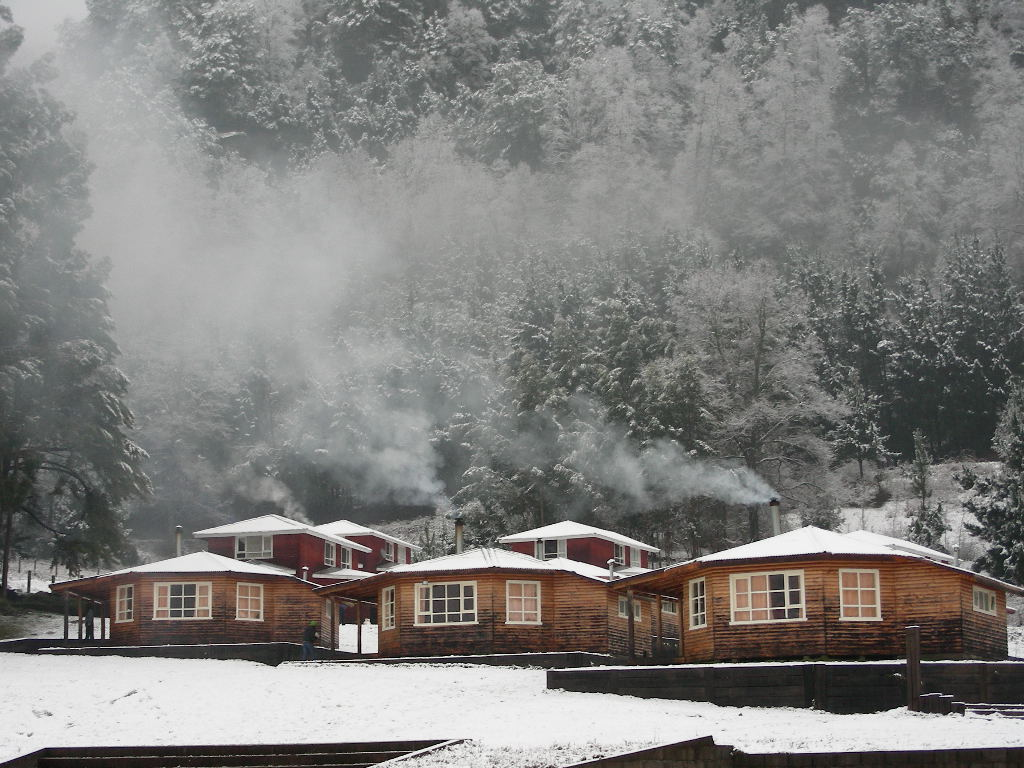
Snow-covered cottages near Curarrehue, Chile

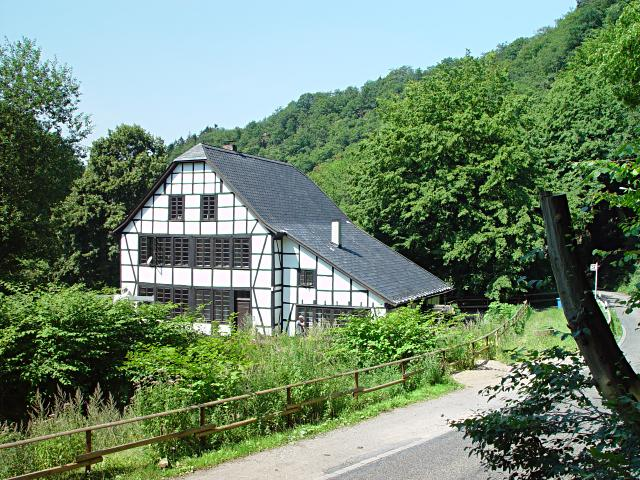
A cotter house (Kotten or Katen) near Solingen, Germany – used as a vacation cottage today

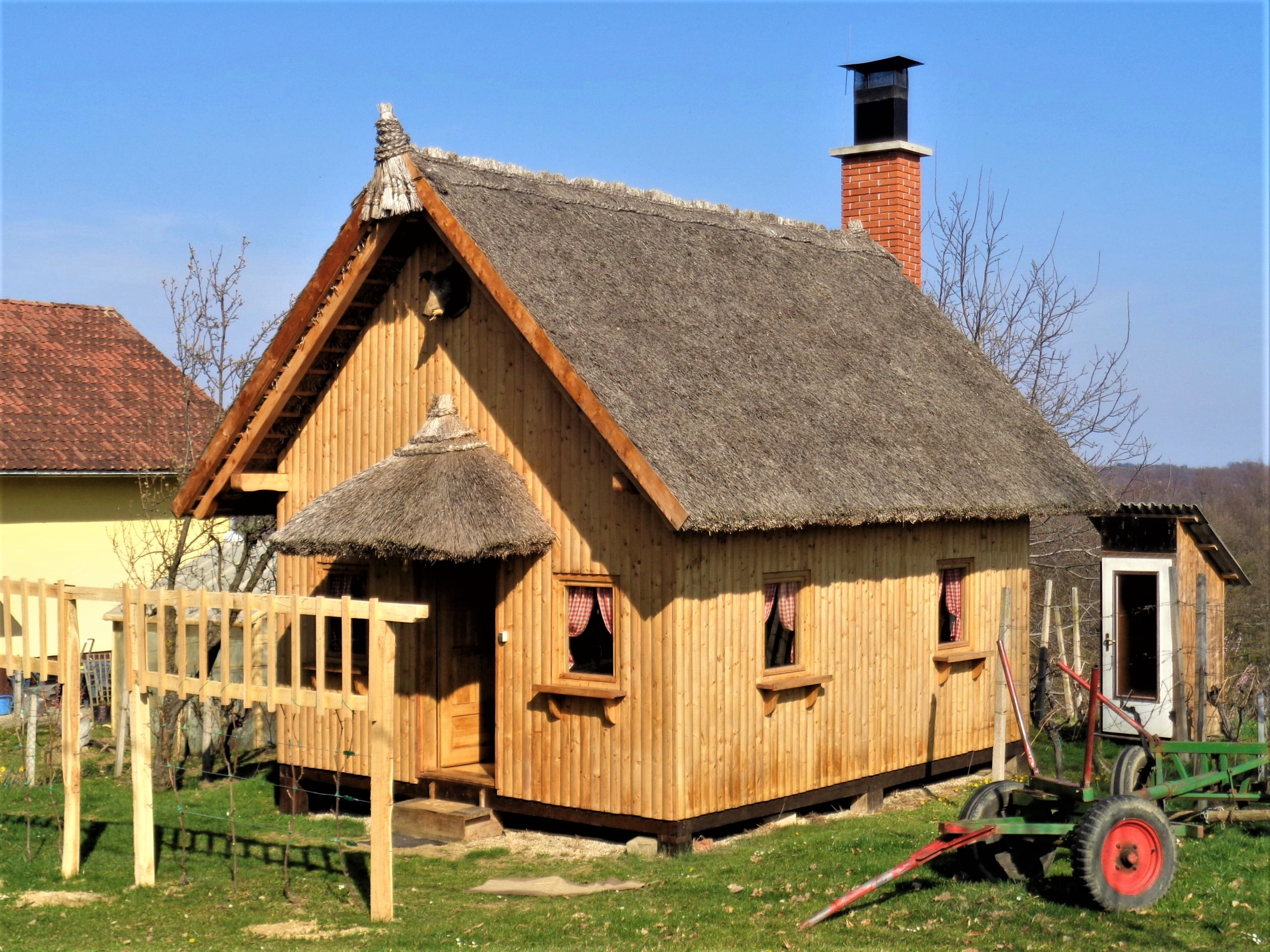
A wooden cottage in Međimurje County, Croatia

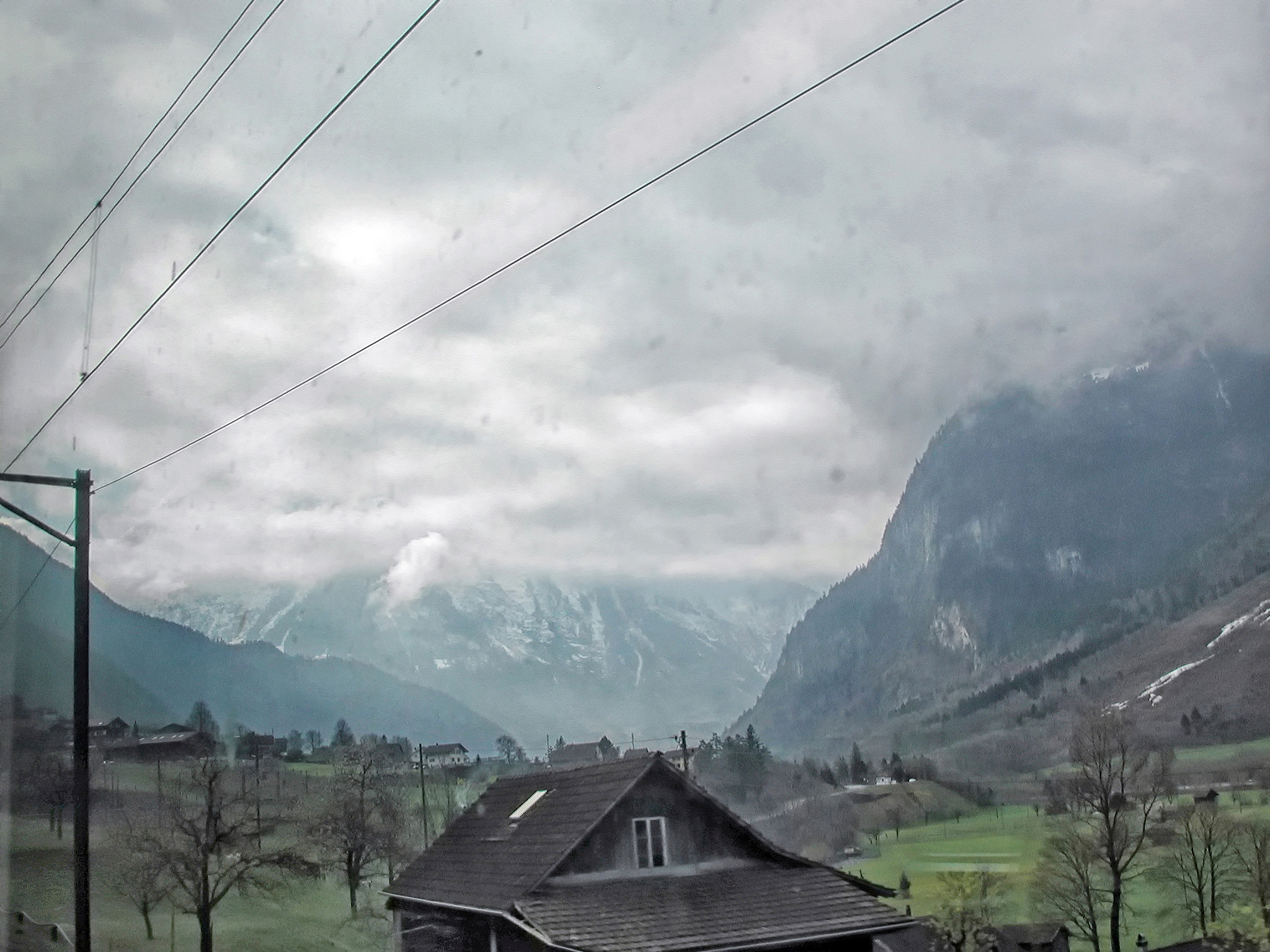
Valley cottages in Switzerland

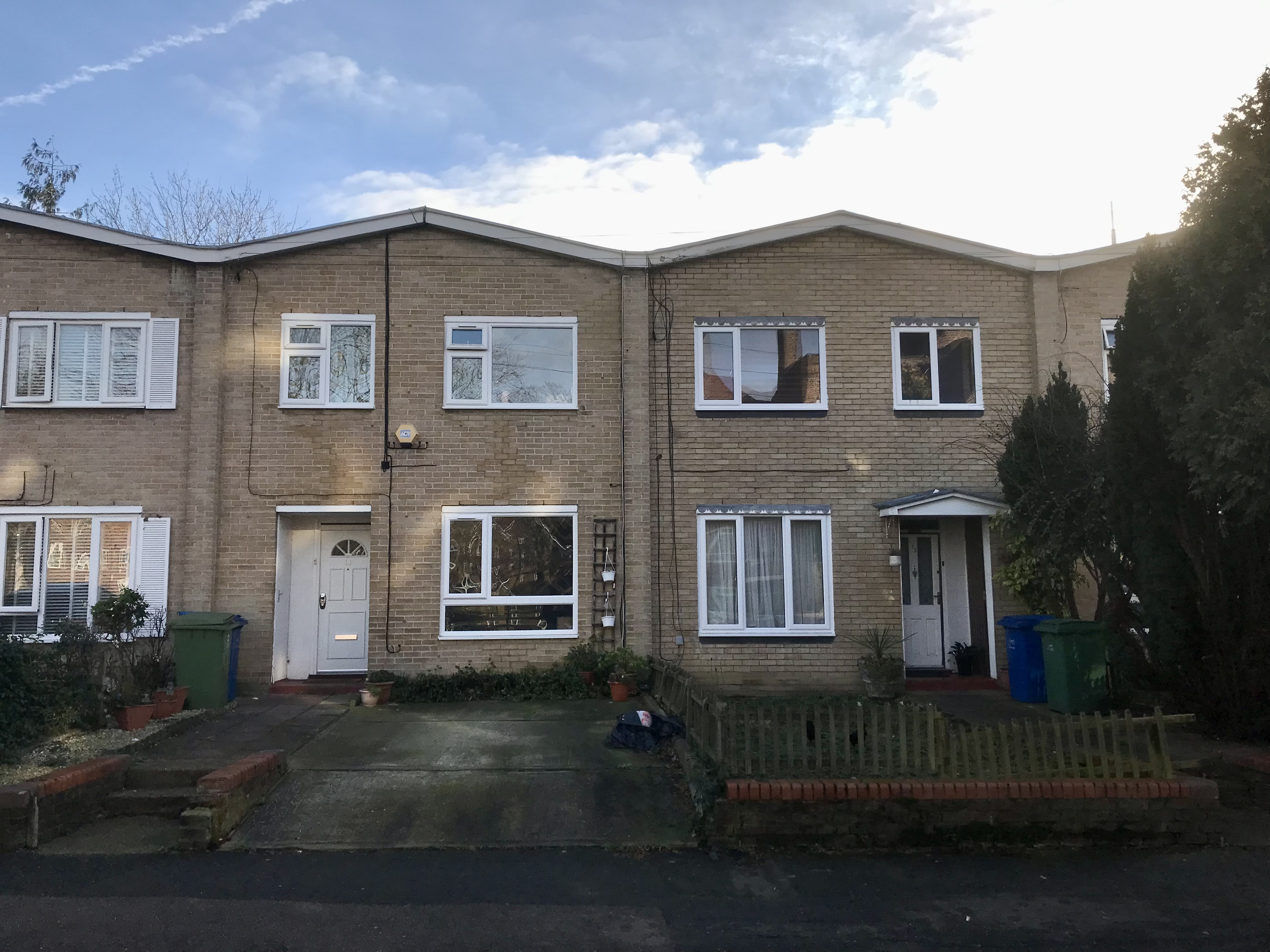
A pair of LCC cottages on Kingswood Estate, England, built c. 1950s

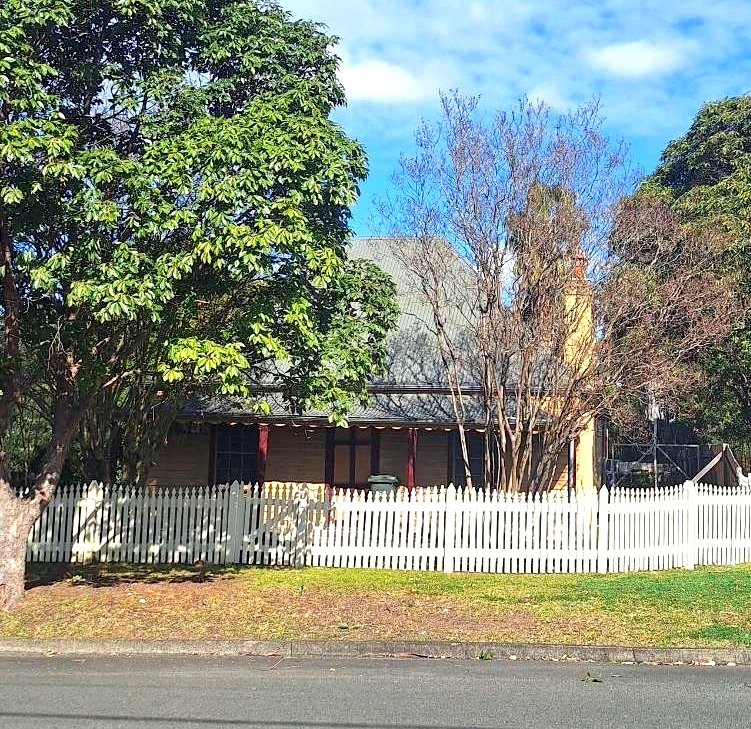
A slab cottage in Western Sydney, Australia, built c. 1880

== See also ==
- Bothy – simple shelter
- Bungalow – a type of single-storey house
- But and ben – a simple cottage, having only an inner and outer room
- Chalet – an alpine style building
- Cottagecore – an aesthetic popularized on the Internet in the 2010s
- Cottage garden
- Cottage industry
- Dacha – seasonal or year-round second homes located in the exurbs of Soviet and Russian cities
- Garden real estate – property with gardens
- Log cabin – small house built from logs
- London County Council cottage estates
- Mar del Plata style – a small living unit located in and around the resort city of Mar del Plata, Argentina
- Mobile home
- Mountain hut – a building located in the mountains intended to provide food and shelter to mountaineers and hikers
- Pied-à-terre – small living unit, typically located in a large city
- Summer house – a term used in the Scandinavian countries to describe the popular holiday homes or summer cottages
- Vacation rental – term in the travel industry meaning renting out a furnished apartment or house on a temporary basis to tourists as an alternative to a hotel
- Vernacular architecture – traditional architecture in a particular area
- Wilderness hut – a rent-free, open dwelling place for temporary accommodation
