= Staroselye, Volgograd Oblast =

Staroselye Староселье
- Selo
- Location within Volgograd Oblast Location within Russia
- Coordinates: 50°00′N 43°15′E
- Country: Russia
- Region: Volgograd Oblast
- District: Mikhaylovka Urban Okrug
- Time zone: UTC+4:00

Staroselye (Russian: Староселье) is a rural locality (a selo) in Mikhaylovka Urban Okrug, Volgograd Oblast, Russia. The population was 1,001 as of 2010. There are 23 streets.

== Geography ==
Staroselye is located 17 km south of Mikhaylovka. Mikhaylovka is the nearest rural locality.
