= Krutinsky, Volgograd Oblast =

Krutinsky Крутинский
- Khutor
- Location within Volgograd Oblast Location within Russia
- Coordinates: 50°13′N 42°51′E
- Country: Russia
- Region: Volgograd Oblast
- District: Mikhaylovka Urban Okrug
- Time zone: UTC+4:00

Krutinsky (Russian: Крутинский) is a rural locality (a khutor) in Mikhaylovka Urban Okrug, Volgograd Oblast, Russia. The population was 221 as of 2010. There are 10 streets.

== Geography ==
Krutinsky is located 44 km northwest of Mikhaylovka. Karagichevsky is the nearest rural locality.
