= Wolters Filling Station =

- U.S. National Register of Historic Places
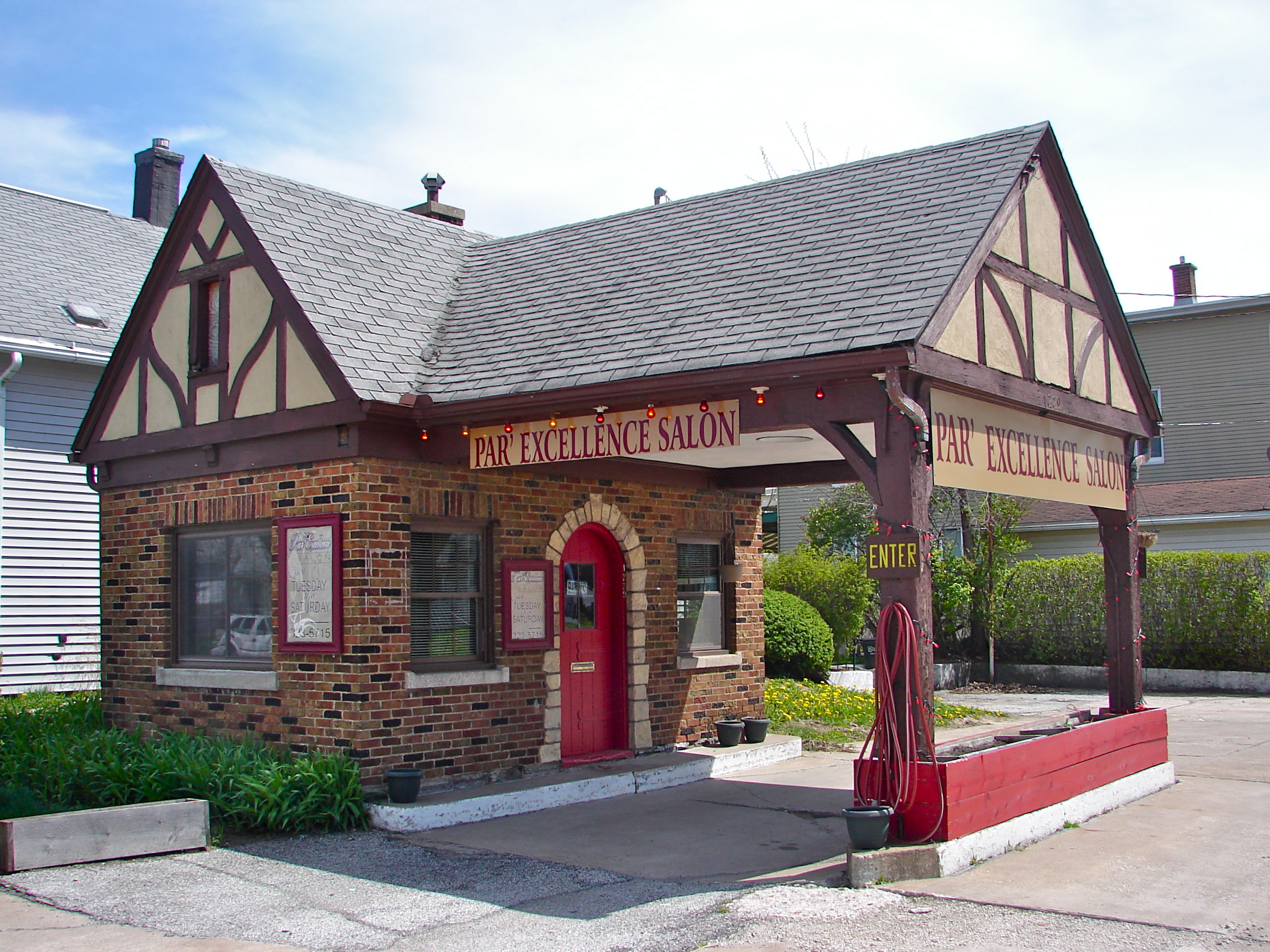

- Location within Iowa Location within the United States
- Location: 1229 Washington St. Davenport, Iowa
- Coordinates: 41°31′57″N 90°35′45″W
- Area: less than one acre
- Built: 1930
- Architectural style: English Cottage
- MPS: Davenport MRA
- NRHP reference No.: 84001595
- Added to NRHP: July 27, 1984

Wolters Filling Station is a historic building located in the West End of Davenport, Iowa, United States. Alfred Wolters built this building to house his filling station in 1930. His son, Dick Wolters, took over the business and operated it as a Standard franchise. The gas pumps were eventually removed and it has been used for other commercial enterprises, including a hair salon.

The station was built in an English Cottage style. It features polychrome brick, metal casement windows, a stone-arched doorway, half-timbered gables, and rustic posts and bracings on the drive-thru. The domestic character of the building was typical for filling stations built in the same era. The filling station was listed on the National Register of Historic Places in 1984.
