= Mikhail Murnov =

Russian footballer

Personal information
- Full name: Mikhail Aleksandrovich Murnov
- Date of birth: 5 April 1978 (age 48)
- Place of birth: Mikhaylovka, Volgograd Oblast, Russian SFSR
- Height: 1.90 m (6 ft 3 in)
- Positions: Defender; midfielder

Senior career*
Years	Team	Apps	(Gls)
1995	FC Dynamo Mikhaylovka	29	(1)
1996	FC Torpedo Volzhsky	27	(0)
1997	FC Energiya Kamyshin	27	(0)
1998	FC Rotor Volgograd	0	(0)
1998–2000	FC Lada Togliatti	63	(2)
2001–2005	FC Sodovik Sterlitamak	136	(15)
2006	FC Baltika Kaliningrad	19	(0)
2007	FC Reutov	9	(0)
2008	FC Lada Togliatti	8	(0)
2009	FC Volgograd	17	(1)
- * Club domestic league appearances and goals

Mikhail Aleksandrovich Murnov (Russian: Михаил Александрович Мурнов; born 5 April 1978) is a former Russian professional football player.

== Club career ==
He played 6 seasons in the Russian Football National League for 5 different clubs.
