= Mikhaylovsky District, Volgograd Oblast =

Mikhaylovsky District Михайловский район (Russian)
- District
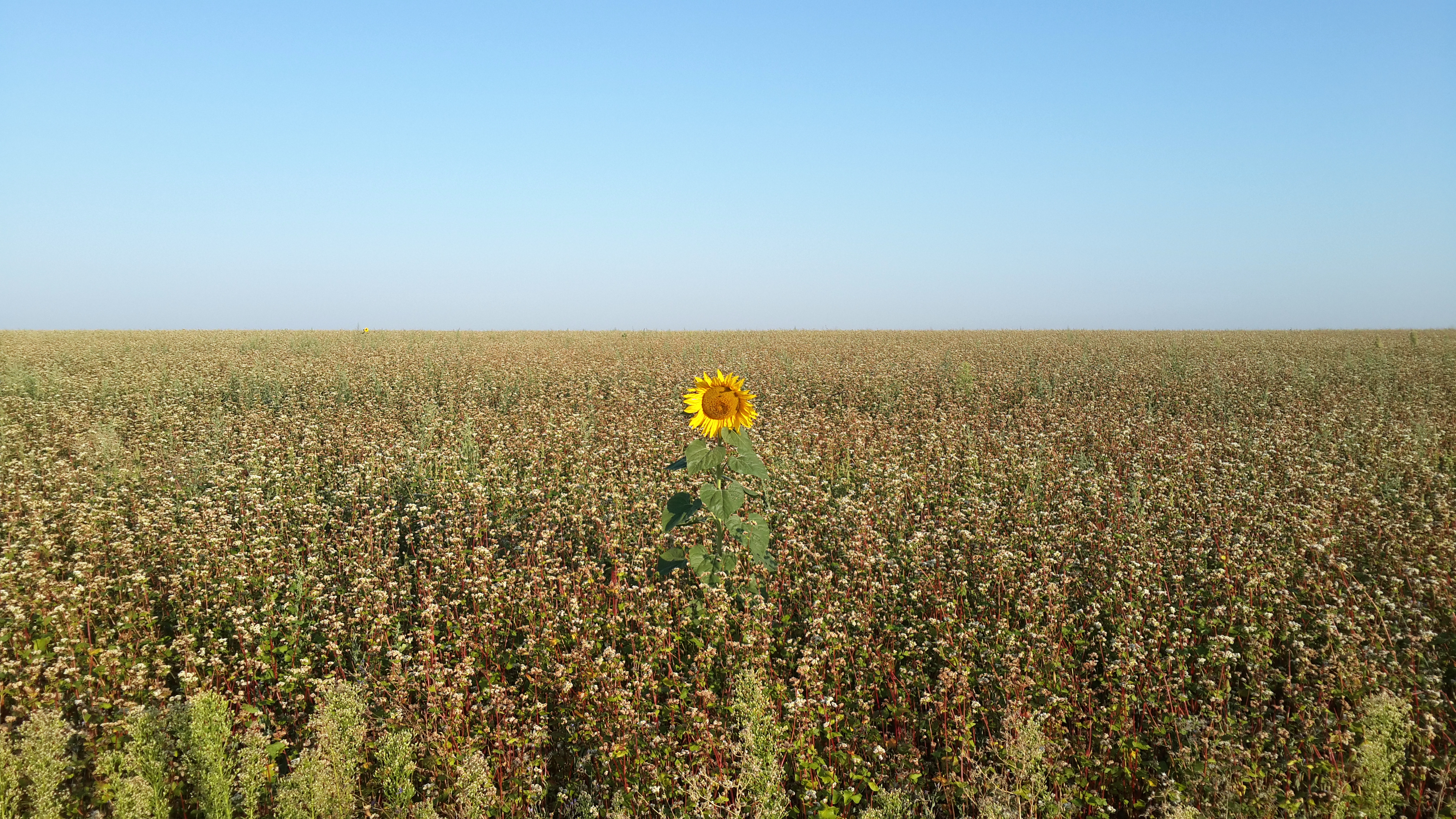
- Buckwheat field, with single Sunflower, in Mikhaylovsky District

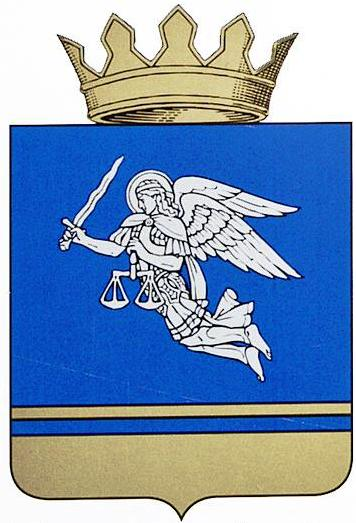
- Coat of arms
- Location of Mikhaylovsky District in Volgograd Oblast
- Coordinates: 50°04′N 43°15′E
- Country: Russia
- Federal subject: Volgograd Oblast
- Established: 1928
- Administrative center: Mikhaylovka

Area
  - Total: 3,660 km^{2} (1,410 sq mi)

Population (2010 Census)
  - Total: 25,936
  - Density: 7.09/km^{2} (18.4/sq mi)
  - Urban: 0%
  - Rural: 100%

Administrative structure
  - Administrative divisions: 15 selsoviet
  - Inhabited localities: 54 rural localities

Municipal structure
  - Municipally incorporated as: Mikhaylovka Urban Okrug
- Website: http://mihadmin.ru/

Mikhaylovsky District (Russian: Миха́йловский райо́н) is an administrative district (raion), one of the thirty-three in Volgograd Oblast, Russia. As a municipal division, it is a part of Mikhaylovka Urban Okrug. It is located in the northwestern central part of the oblast. The area of the district is 3,660 square kilometers (1,410 sq mi). Its administrative center is the town of Mikhaylovka (which is not administratively a part of the district). Population: 25,936 (2010 census); 25,978 (2002 Census); 25,112 (1989 Soviet census).

== Administrative and municipal status ==
Within the framework of administrative divisions, Mikhaylovsky District is one of the thirty-three in the oblast. The town of Mikhaylovka serves as its administrative center, despite being incorporated separately as a town of oblast significance—an administrative unit with the status equal to that of the districts.

As a municipal division, the territory of the administrative district and the territory of the town of oblast significance of Mikhaylovka are incorporated together as Mikhaylovka Urban Okrug. The district used to be incorporated as Mikhaylovsky Municipal District, but effective July 10, 2012, the municipal district was merged into Mikhaylovka Urban Okrug and abolished.
