= Mikhaylovka Urban Okrug =

Coordinates: 50.0667°N 43.2333°E

Mikhaylovka Urban Okrug (Russian: городско́й о́круг Миха́йловка) is a municipal formation (an urban okrug) in Volgograd Oblast, Russia, one of the six urban okrugs in the oblast. Its territory comprises the territories of two administrative divisions of Volgograd Oblast—Mikhaylovsky District and the town of oblast significance of Mikhaylovka.

The municipal formation was established on April 6, 2005 and originally encompassed only the territory of the town of oblast significance of Mikhaylovka. Effective July 10, 2012, the territory of Mikhaylovsky Municipal District was merged into Mikhaylovka Urban Okrug.
