= Mikhaylovka, Volgograd Oblast =

Town in Volgograd Oblast, Russia

Mikhaylovka Михайловка
- Town
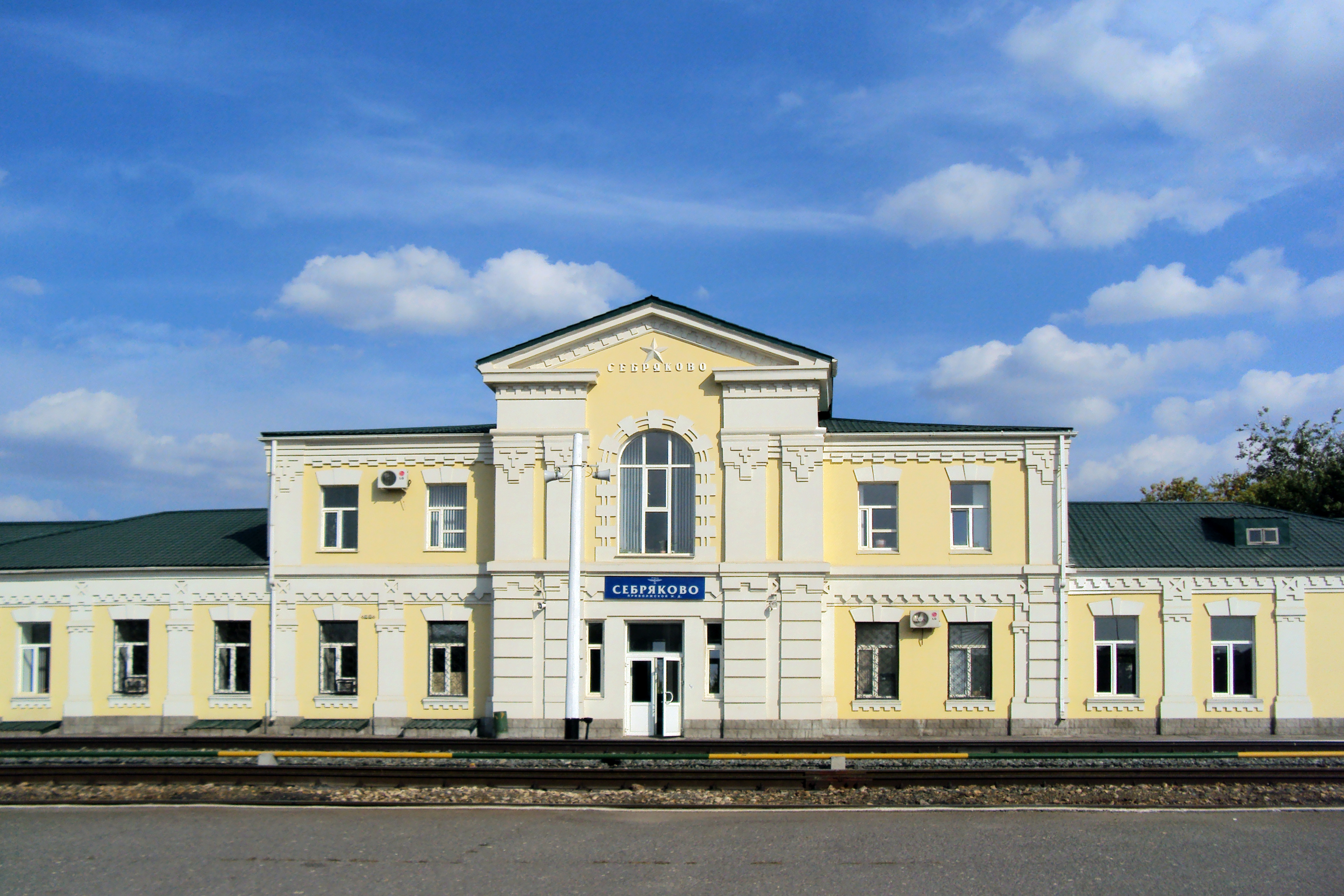
- Serebryakovo railway station in Mikhaylovka

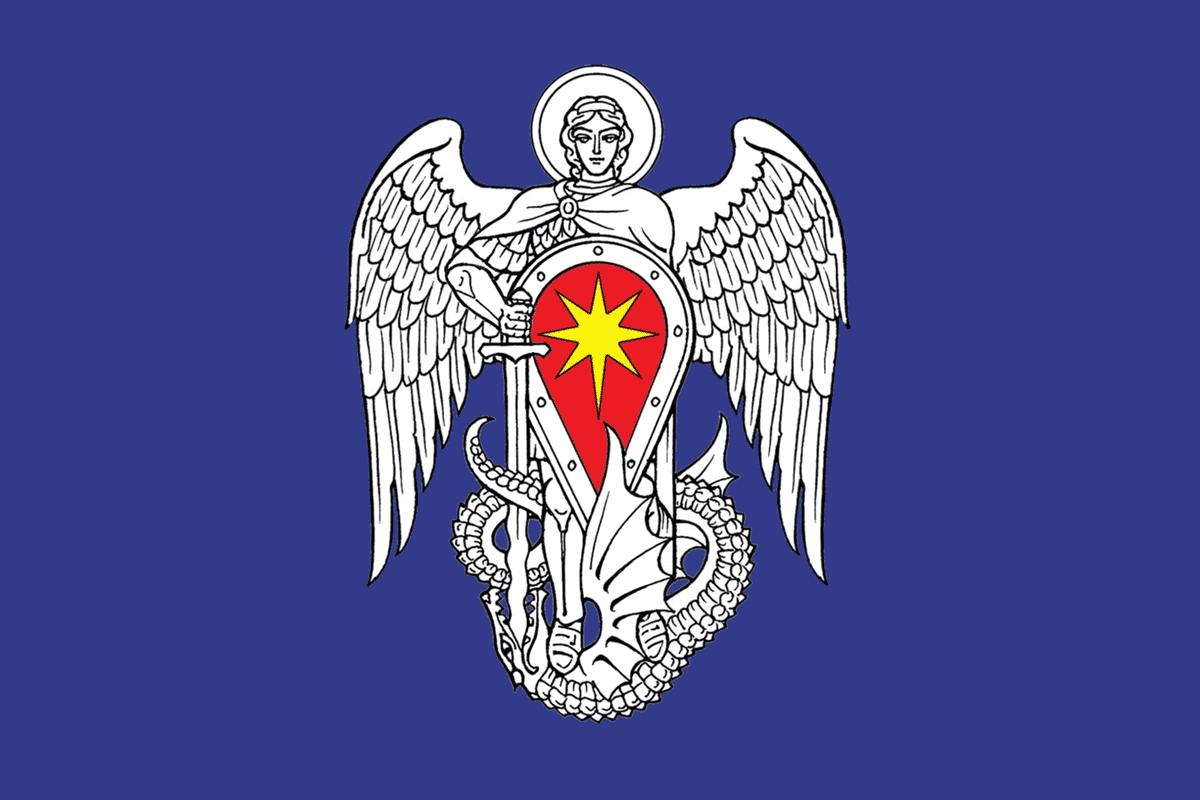
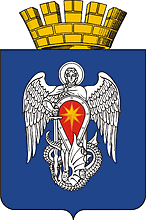
- Flag Coat of arms
- Interactive map of Mikhaylovka
- Location of Mikhaylovka Mikhaylovka (Volgograd Oblast)
- Coordinates: 50°04′N 43°15′E
- Country: Russia
- Federal subject: Volgograd Oblast
- Founded: 1762
- Town status since: 1948
- Elevation: 83 m (272 ft)

Population (2010 Census)
  - Total: 59,132
  - Estimate (2025): 54,343 (−8.1%)
  - Rank: 279th in 2010

Administrative status
  - Subordinated to: town of oblast significance of Mikhaylovka
  - Capital of: Mikhaylovsky District, town of oblast significance of Mikhaylovka

Municipal status
  - Urban okrug: Mikhaylovka Urban Okrug
  - Capital of: Mikhaylovka Urban Okrug
- Time zone: UTC+3 (MSK)
- Postal codes: 403310, 403300, 403340–403349
- OKTMO ID: 18720000001
- Website: www.mihadm.ru

Mikhaylovka (Russian: Миха́йловка) is a town in Volgograd Oblast, Russia, located on the right bank of the Medveditsa River, 210 kilometers (130 mi) northwest of Volgograd. Population: 59,132 (2010 census); 60,034 (2002 census); 58,323 (1989 Soviet census).

== History ==
It was established in 1762 as a khutor and named for its owner Mikhail Sebryakov. It was granted town status in 1948. In 1953, Sebryakovsky cement plant was commissioned, and in 1955 - a slate plant. In 1961, the city passed into regional subordination.

June 12, 2012, Mikhaylovka and the district are merged into one municipality - the urban district of the city of Mikhailovka.

== Administrative and municipal status ==
Within the framework of administrative divisions, Mikhaylovka serves as the administrative center of Mikhaylovsky District, even though it is not a part of it. As an administrative division, it is, together with one urban-type settlement, incorporated separately as the town of oblast significance of Mikhaylovka—an administrative unit with the status equal to that of the districts. As a municipal division, territories of the town of oblast significance of Mikhaylovka and of Mikhaylovsky District are incorporated as Mikhaylovka Urban Okrug.

== Notable people ==
- Mikhail Murnov (born 1978), former Russian professional football player

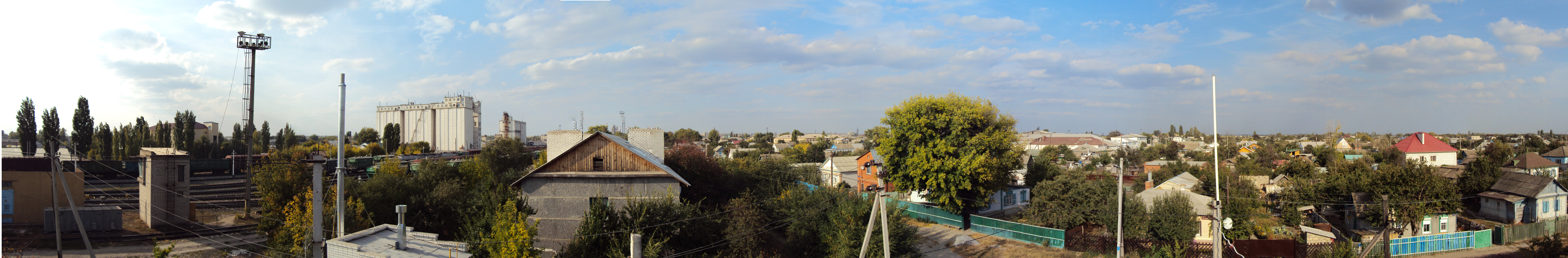
