= Von Geldern =

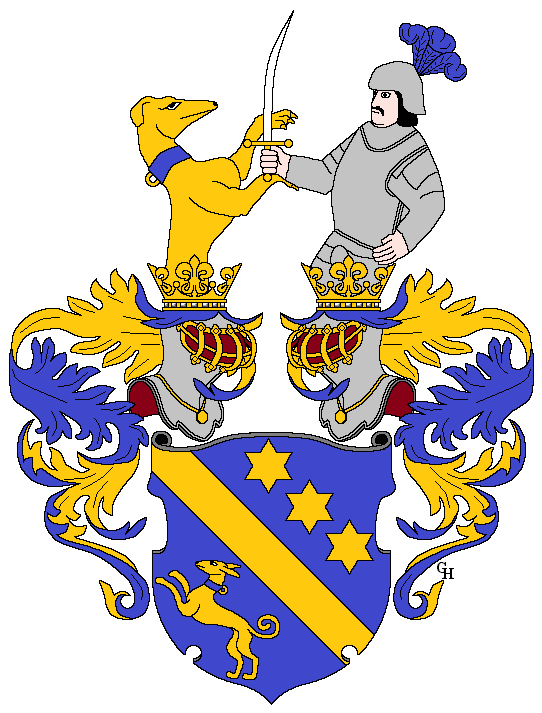
Coat of arms of Barons von Geldern (1878)

Von Geldern is a nobiliary predicate, borne by several relatives of the German poet Heinrich Heine. Members of Heine’s family who were ennobled adopted the predicate von along with the name Geldern, reflecting their elevation to Austrian nobility rather than indicating a separate hereditary family name.

== Notable people ==
- Simon von Geldern (1720–1774), German traveler and author
- Gustav Heine, Freiherr von Geldern (1812–1886), German-Austrian publicist
- Robert Baron (Freiherr) von Heine-Geldern (1885–1968), Austrian scholar
- Wolfgang von Geldern (born 1944), German politician (CDU)

== See also ==
- List of European Jewish nobility
- Heine
- Geldern
