= Indian armour =

Protection of the body in South Asia

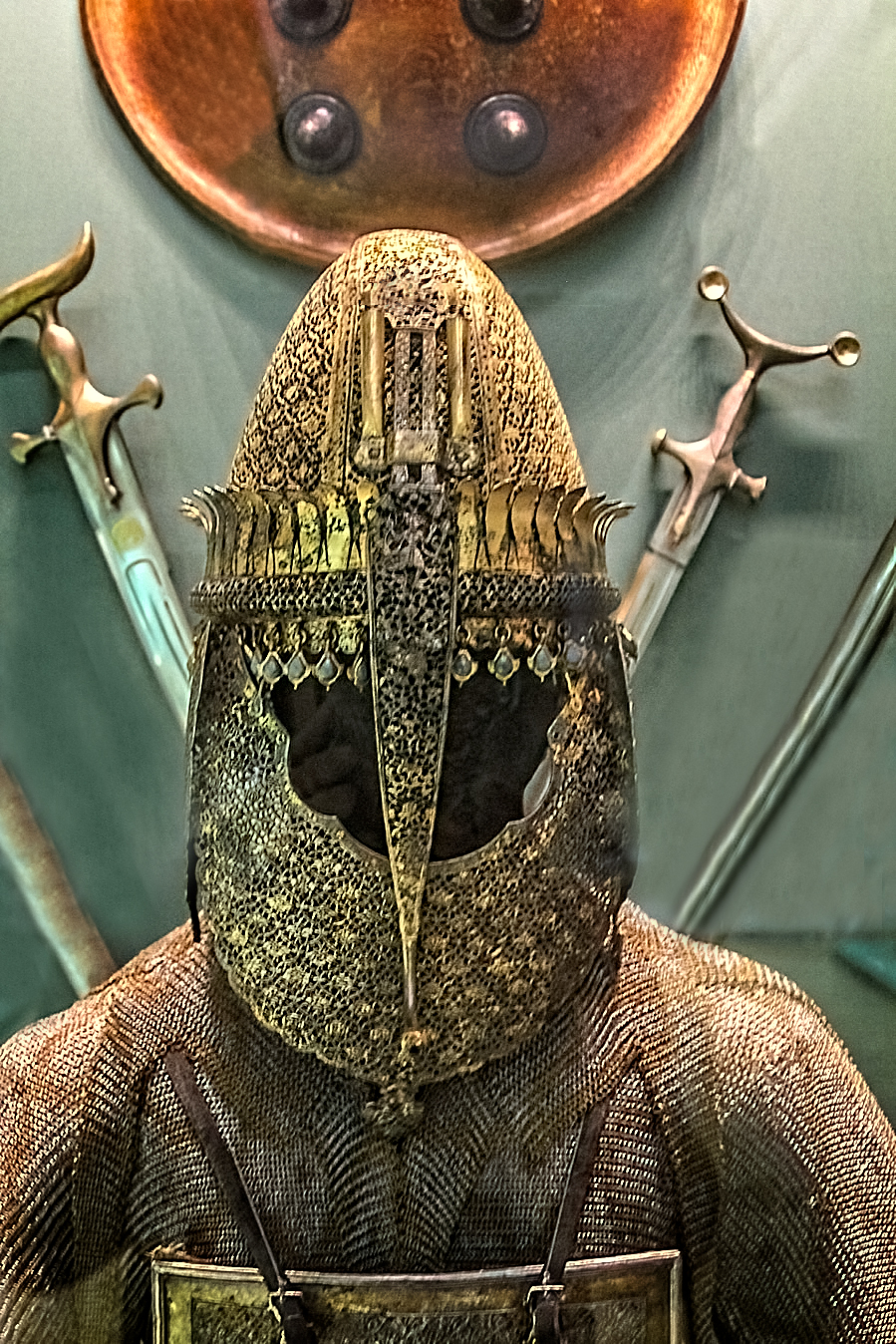
An early 18th century Maratha helmet and armor from the Hermitage Museum, St. Petersburg, Russia.

Armor in the Indian subcontinent was used since antiquity. Its earlier reference is found in the Vedic period. Armor has been described in religious texts; including the Itihasa epics Ramayana and Mahabharat, as well as in the Puranas.

== Bronze Age ==
Major findings from Sinauli trial excavations dated to c. 2000 - 1500 BCE from the Ochre Coloured Pottery culture (OCP)/Copper Hoard Culture, which was contemporaneous with the Late Harappan culture reviled several wooden coffin burials, which included copper swords, helmets, bow and arrow and wooden carts with solid disk wheels and protected by copper sheets.

== Vedic period ==
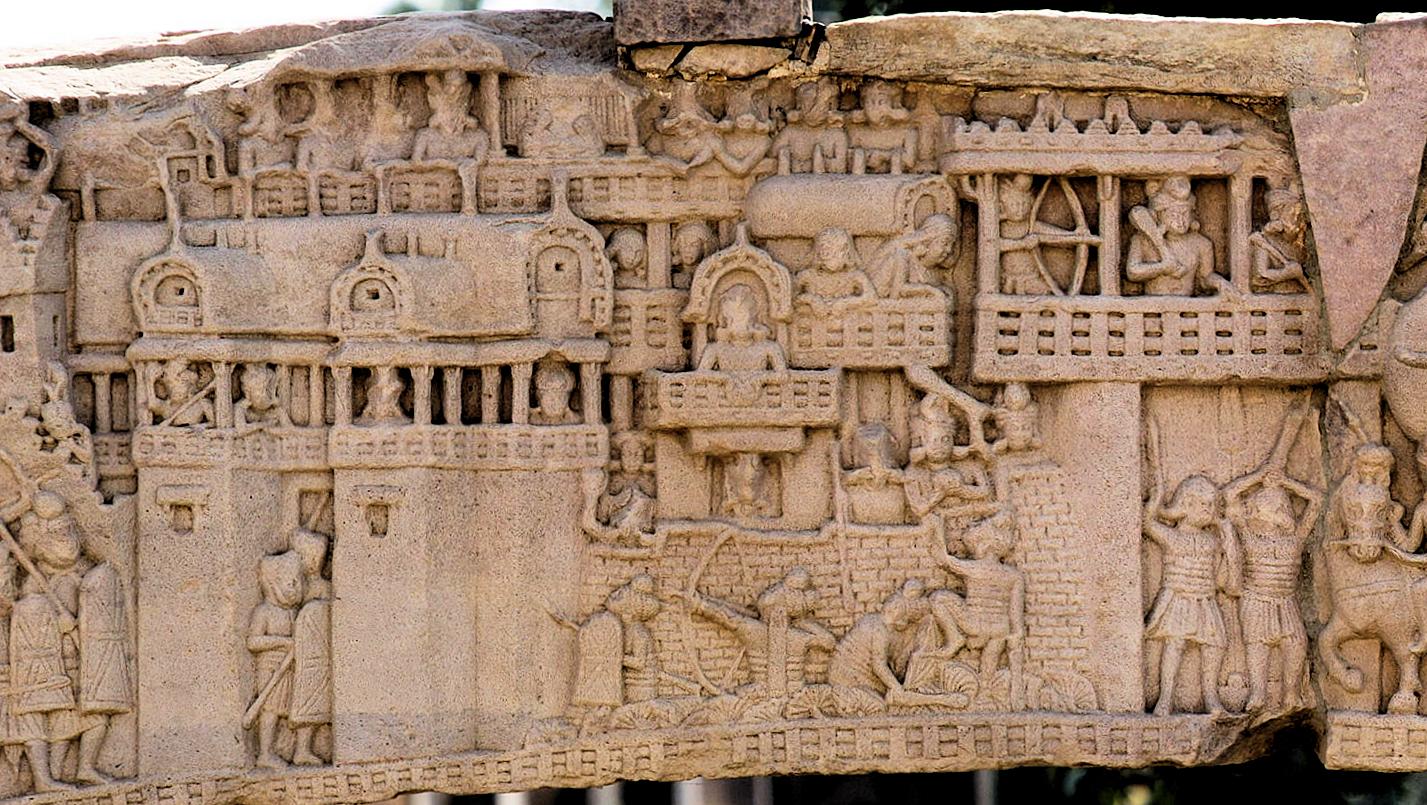
City of Kushinagara in the 5th century BCE according to a 1st-century BCE frieze in Sanchi Stupa 1 Southern Gate.

The Vedic age recorded in-fighting among Indian clans for supremacy over the upper Indo-Gangetic Plain. In the Battle of the Ten Kings prominent Vedic clans clashed along the Ravi River. The Vedas and the other texts of the period record these struggles in detail and provide a clear picture of the military set up of during those periods.

The concept of a warrior class had already gained ground and the kshatriya claimed to have originated from the arms of Purusha. They tried to maintain this distinct identity of their own through their garments and attire. The common attire (when they are not situated at the battlefield) for the kshatriya warrior was deer skin. Their under-garments were made cloak dyed with Indian maddar. They also wore hemp thread and a bow string as a mark of distinction.

Armour was prominently mentioned in the Rigveda:

The warrior's look is like a thunderous rain-cloud's, when, armed with mail, he seeks the lap of battle. Be thou victorious with unwounded body: so let the thickness of thy mail protect thee...Thy vital parts I cover with thine armour: with immortality...clothe thee...

— Rig Veda, tr. by Ralph T.H. Griffith, [1896], HYMN LXXV. Weapons of War.

The defensive armors became the integral part of military costume. They were worn after duly sanctified by mantras. It appears that they were used only by the nobility. The average soldier wore deer skin, and is mentioned in the Atharvaveda, stating that the shield and outfit made of deer skin struck terror amid the enemies of god. The nobles and elite warriors wore a coat of mail called a drapi, kavacha, or varman. They covered their back, chest, and lower parts of their body.

Certain warriors in the Vedic period wore metal armour called varman. In the Rig Veda the varman is described as sewn armor or a coat of mail that covers the whole body.

Agni, the man who giveth guerdon to the priests, like well-sewn armour thou guardest on every side.

— The Rig Veda/Mandala 1/Hymn 31

Historians such as Edward Washburn Hopkins deduce that the armour was metal that covered the body and was connected by wires. On the head multiple metal pieces were connected together for helmets.

The kavacha is described to be a fitted plate armour covering the chest. The word kavaca is used in Atharva Veda in the sense of an armour clas cuirass breast plate as opposed to the varman coat of mail:

...warrior, mailed, unmailed, each foeman in the rush of war. Down-smitten with the strings of bows, the fastenings of mail, the charge! The armour-clad, the armourless, enemies clothed with coats of mail. All struck down...

— Artha Veda Book XI Hymn XXII

The use of helmets is frequently mentioned in the vedas. Shirastrana was a helmet or head guard worn by soldiers to protect the head. Siprin would mean a person wearing a helmet. Common soldiers would go bare headed, some kept long hairs and wore animal horns. Indra is described as the golden helmeted hero with a visor:

So be the lofty Indra prompt to listen, Helper unaided, golden-visored Hero.

— The Rig Veda/Mandala 6/Hymn 29

Hastaghna was and arm guard used to protect the hands. It was worn on the left arm to avoid friction of bow strings. It was made of leather but later on metal gauntlets seem to have used instead.

For the protection of the legs; greaves, anklets, and shoes were used. The noble warriors wore ornaments like armlets, bracelets, clasps, necklaces, and various garlands.

Description of armor was continued in the Upanishads.

Its priestly honorarium consists of a horse chariot pulled by four horses. The chariot is provided with golden plates, with a whip, with all sorts of ornaments and with splendour. Its deck is covered with tiger skin, its bow-case with panther skin, its quiver with bear skin. The warrior standing on it is equipped for battle, wearing armour made of rhinoceros skin; he has a charioteer equipped for battle, and is protected by the two side panels. The rein-holder wears a neck ornament and a garland.

— Jaiminīya-Brāhmaṇa

== Mahajanapadas Period ==
Armour is discussed in Chanakya's Arthashastra, which is traditionally dated to the fourth century BCE. The Arthashastra extensively discusses various types of armors used in ancient India. These armors included lohajālika, paṭṭa, kavaca, and sūtraka. Lohajālika is believed to be a type of mail armor (loha is metal, and jalika refers to 'net' or 'latticework') which was made from iron or steel that covered the body and arms. Lohajālika was prevalent due to its lightweight properties and resilience against a variety of blows, such as from bladed weapons such as swords and axes. In the Arthashastra, the Patta armor is described as a coat of iron, steel or animal skins with hoofs and horns of various animals like porpoise, rhinoceros, and bison without cover for the arms.

The kavacha was plate armor that covered the chest, torso and other parts of the body, providing protection to warriors. It was tightly fitted and made of metal or leather, offering defense in battle. Sūtraka was a type of armor made of leather or iron. It covered only hips and the waist. Likewise śirāstrāṇa (cover for the head), kaṇṭhatrāṇa (cover for the neck), kūrpāsa (cover for trunk), kañcuka (a coat extending as far as the knee joints), vāravāṇa (a coat extending as far as the heels), paṭṭa (a coat without cover for the arms), and nāgodarikā (gloves) are the varieties of armour. Armour and Ornaments for elephants, chariots, and horses as well as goads and hooks to lead them in battlefields constitute accessory things (upakaraṇāni).

The Kingdom of Magadha rapidly expanded its military infrastructure under King Ajatashatru, creating the foundation of later empires in Pataliputra. He introduced the rathamusala, an armoured chariot with protruding blades.

There are references by historians noting the armour King Porus used in battle against Alexander. The scholar Arrian recorded that the armour was shot-proof, and remarkably well fitted.

The Bharhut Stupa depicts the use of leather scale armour. Furthermore, on the Sanchi Stupa, soldiers are depicted wearing quilted armour.

== Puranic and Epic armour ==
In Mahabharata, there are much evidence of using armour during the battles.

Kavacha

- Karna Kavacha - The armour of Karna that was granted by his father Surya at birth. It was impenetrable even to heavenly weapons.
- Shiva-Kavacha - The armour of Lord Shiva which will make its wielder invincible.

Khetaka

- Jaivardhan - A shield of Lord Vishnu and Lord Shiva.
- The shield of Samba
- Srivatsa - The shield of Vishnu, a symbol worshiped and revered by the Hindus, said to be manifested on the god's chest.

== Gupta period ==
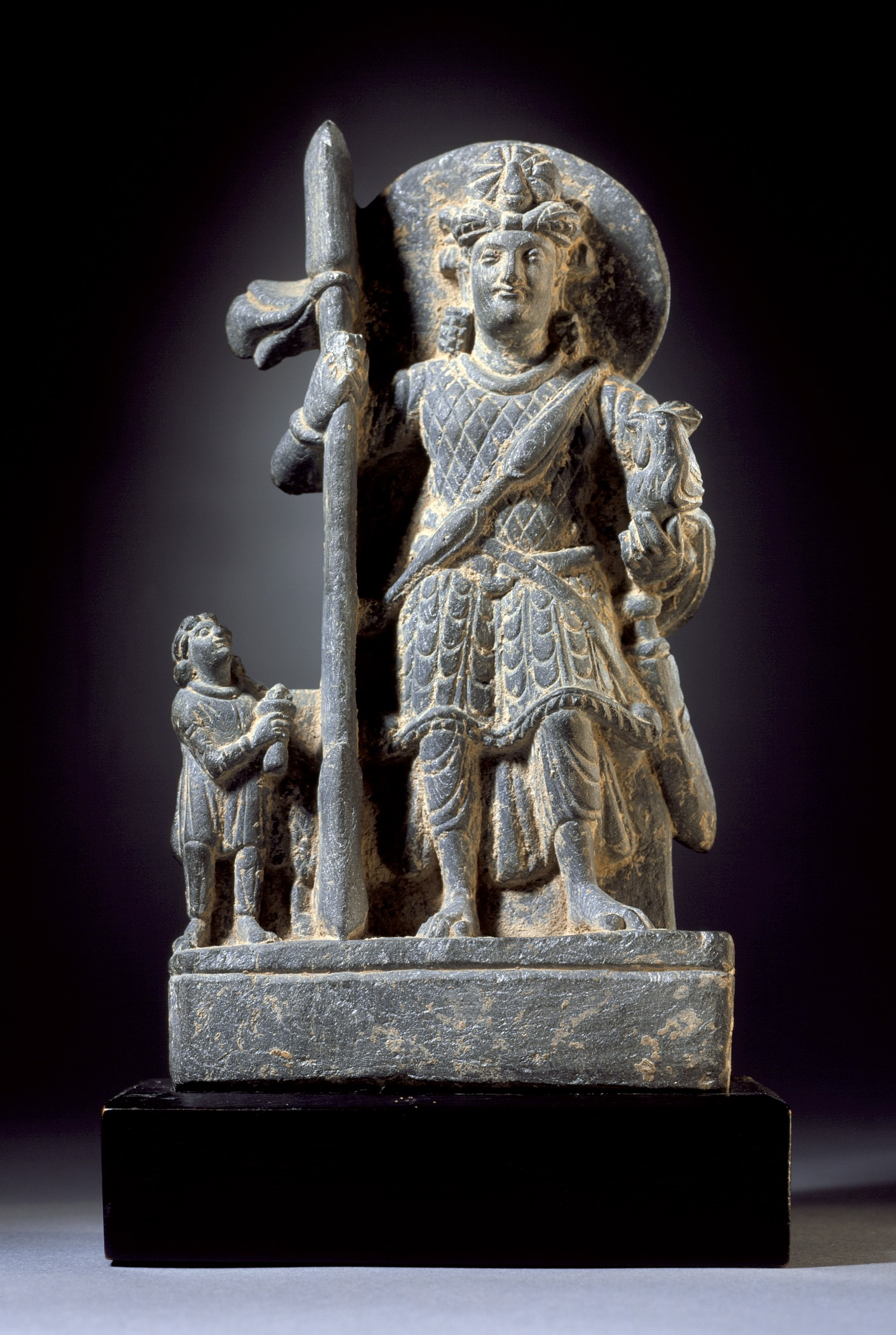
Kumara/Kartikeya in scale mail armour with a Kushan devotee, 2nd century CE

Indo-Scythians and Indo-Parthians were depicted wearing chain mail in numismatic findings. Chain armour was usually employed by the cataphract heavy cavalry.

During the Gupta period, scale mail armour composed of metal and sometimes leather was used. Guptas were more than two centuries more advanced than the equipment and technology being depicted here and that their armour was built to withstand torsion-driven steel bows. Siva-Dhanur-Veda discusses the military of the Gupta Empire. The Guptas relied heavily on armoured war elephants; horses were used little if at all. Guptas utilised heavy cavalry clad in mail armour and equipped with maces and lances, who would have used shock action to break the enemy line.

During the Satavahana period the armour was inspired by the armour used by the Indo-Scythians and the Alchon Huns.

== Medieval period (1206 CE-1526 CE) ==
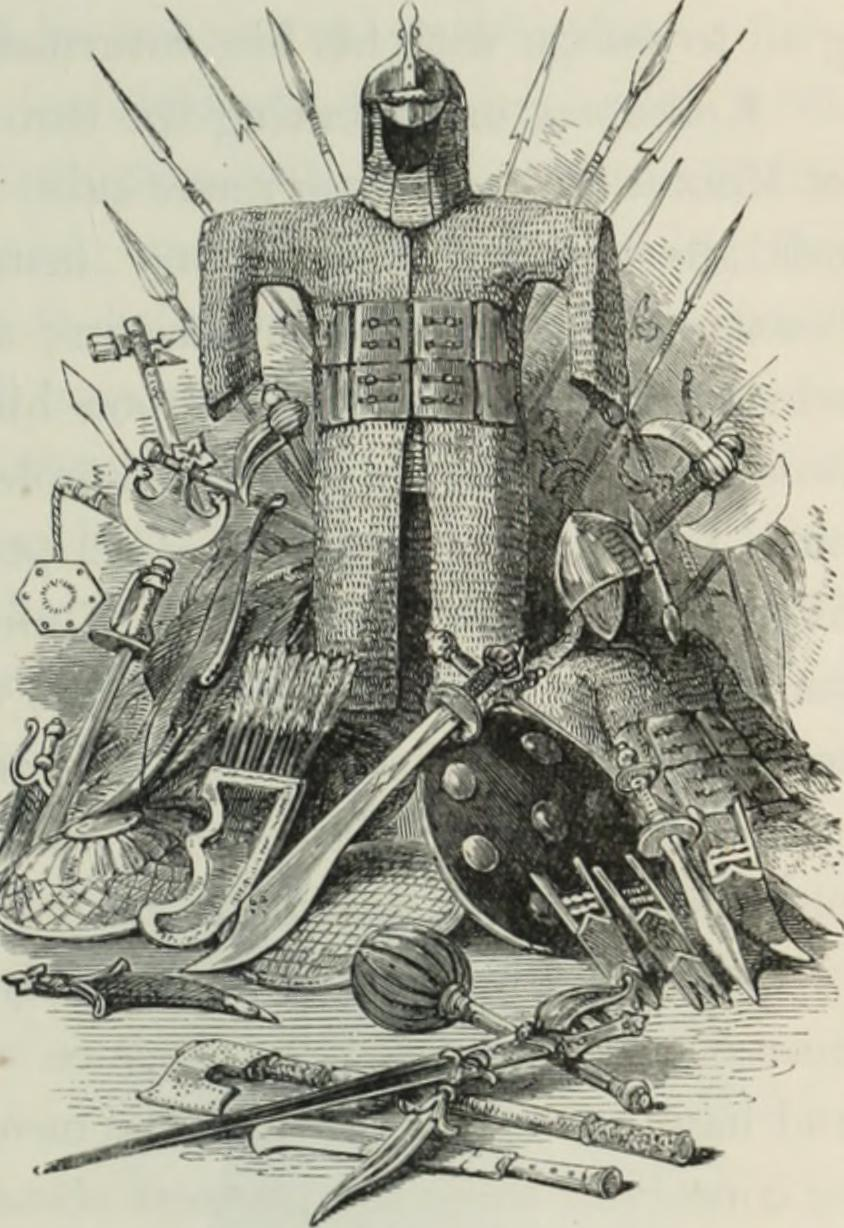
Group of Indian Armour

A reference of chainmail armour dressed on war elephants was mentioned in the inscription of Mularaja II and also at the Battle of Delhi. Udayaprabha Suri, in his Sukrita-Kirti-Kallolini, states that Naikidevi gave Mularaja an army to play with. With this army, Mularaja defeated the Hammira (Sanskrit form of Emir) and his mlechchha army, whose soldiers were covered from head to toe in order to protect themselves.

== Modern Period (1526 CE-1857 CE) ==
Early Modern period

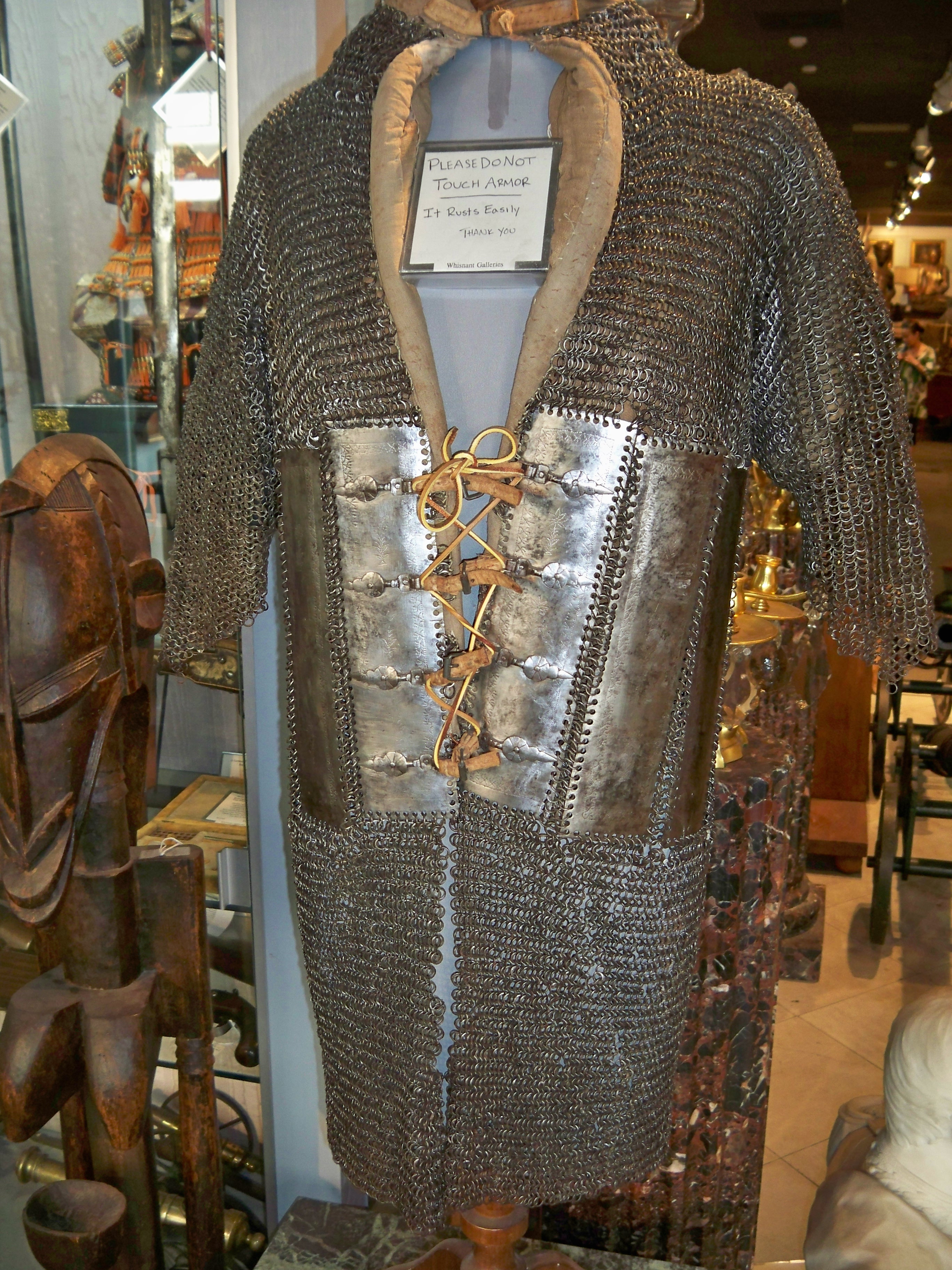
Riveted mail and plate coat zirah bagtar. Armour of this type was introduced into India under the Turks and Mughals.

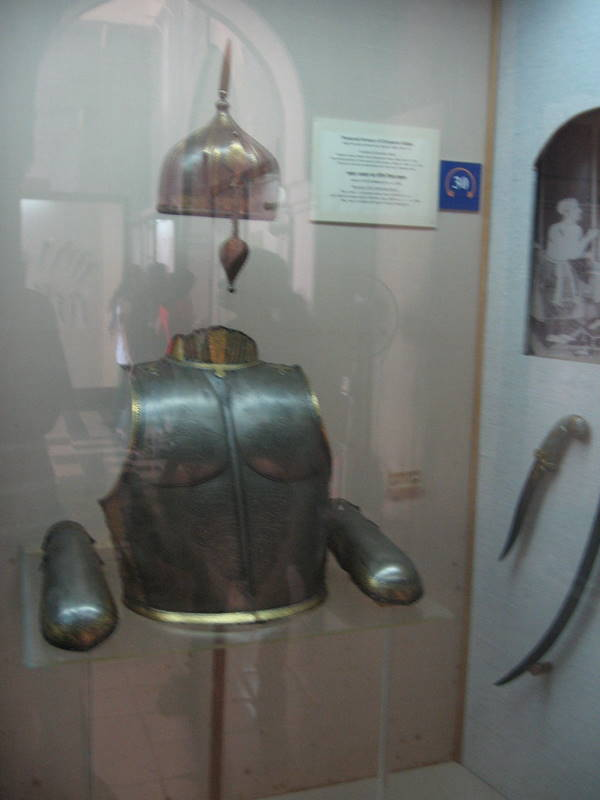
16th century armour of Akbar the Great.

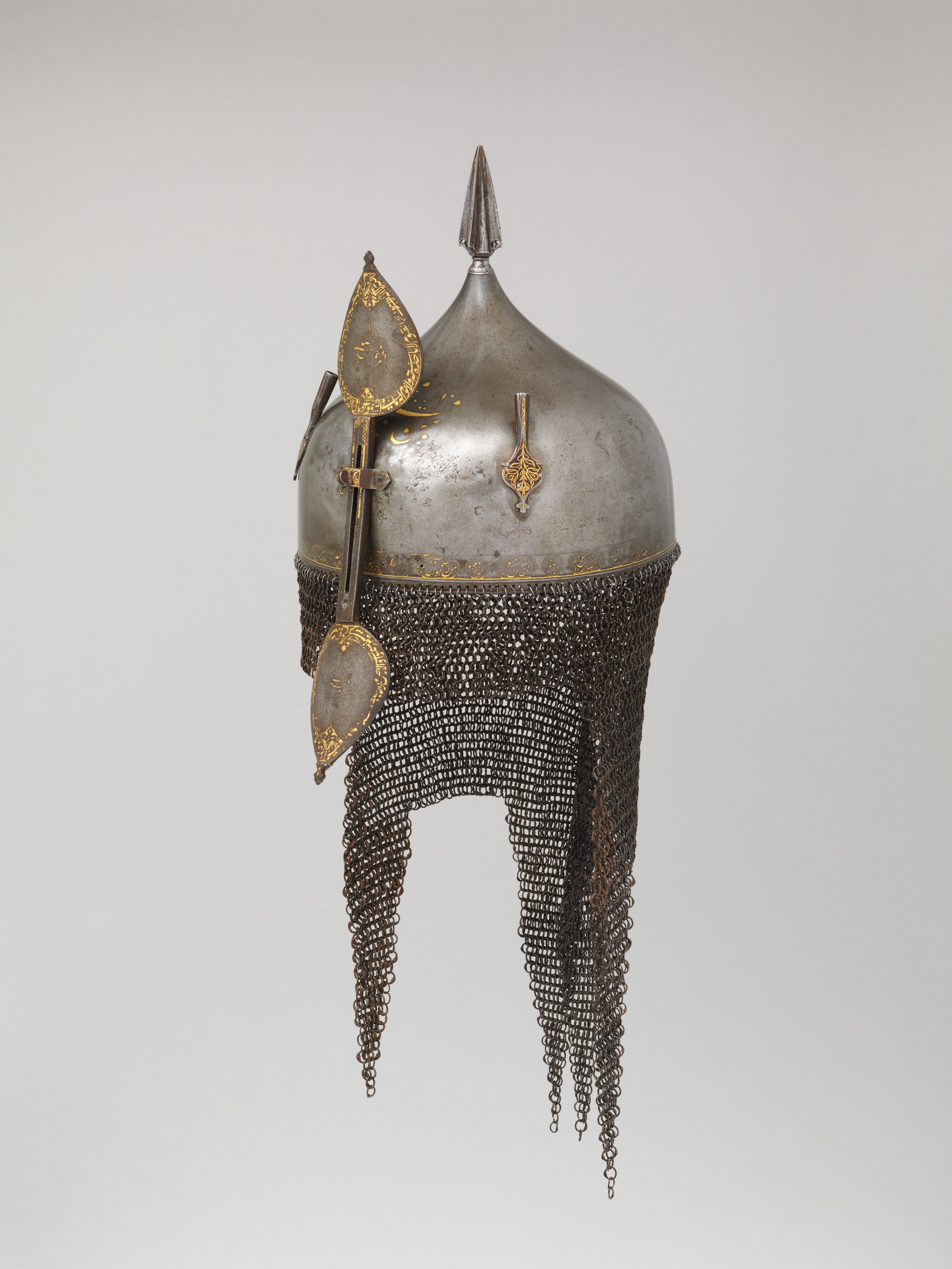
A style of helmet known as top in India. This top came from the Deccan region.

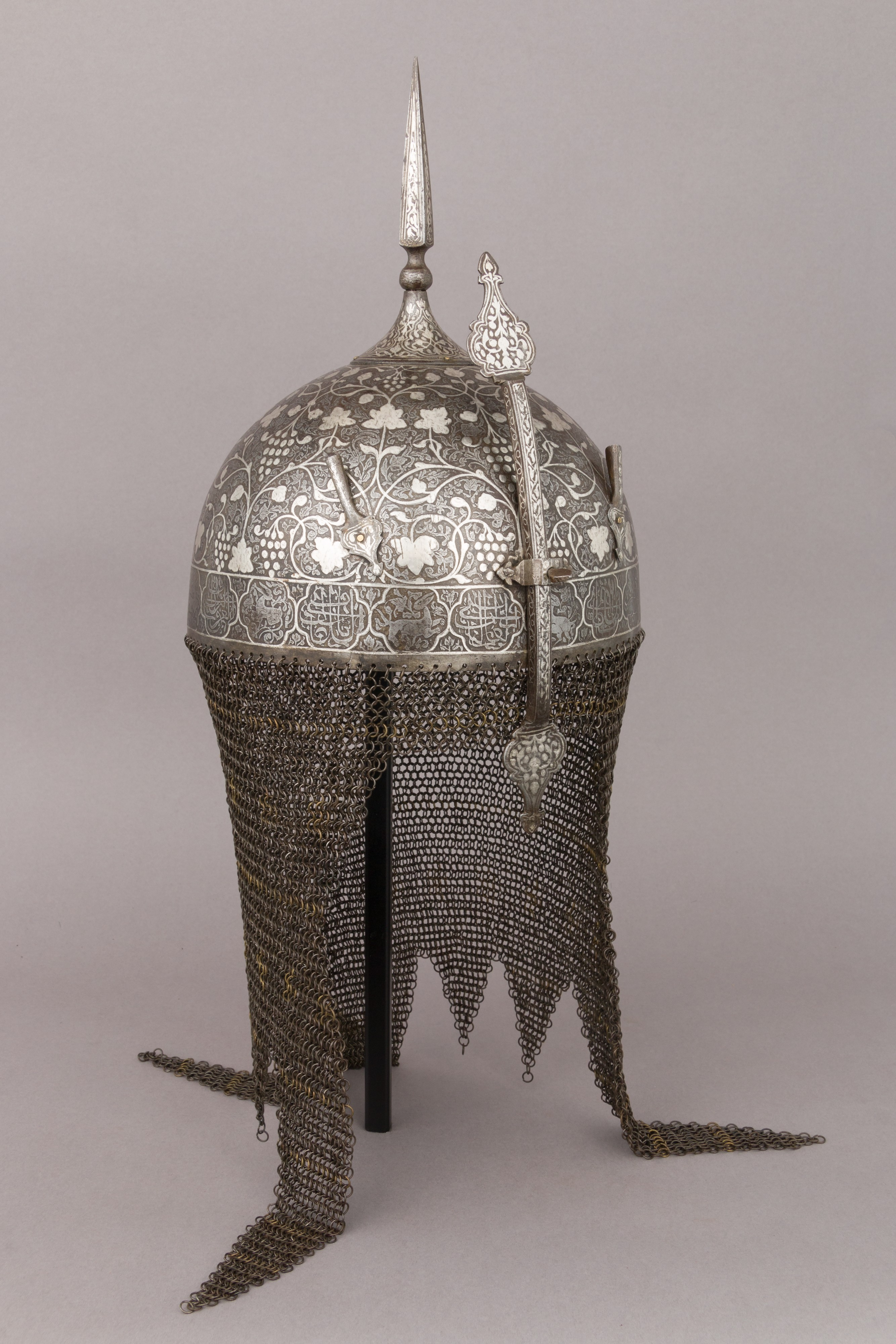
A highly ornate top from 18th-century Mughal warrior.

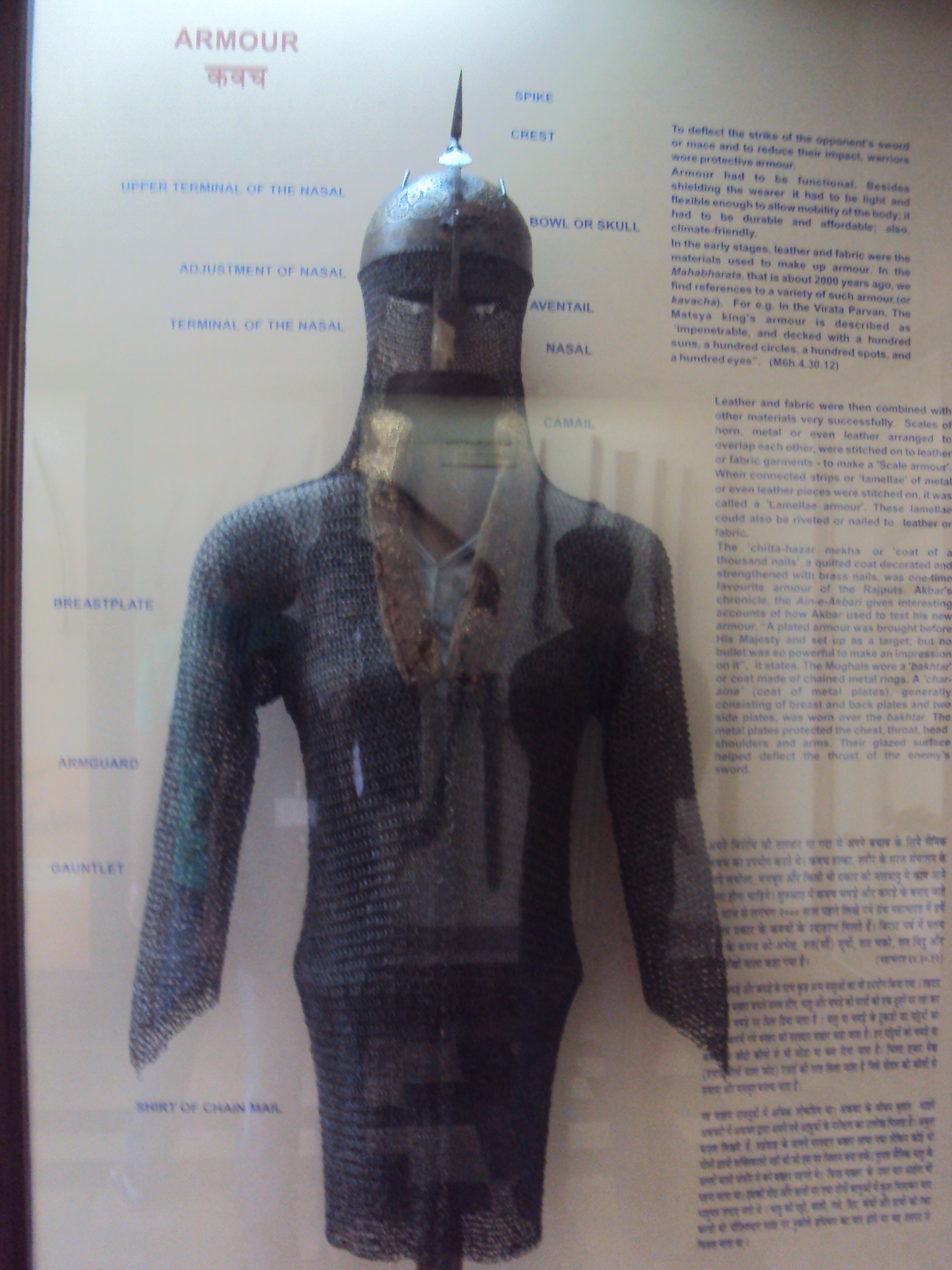
17th century Maratha armour.

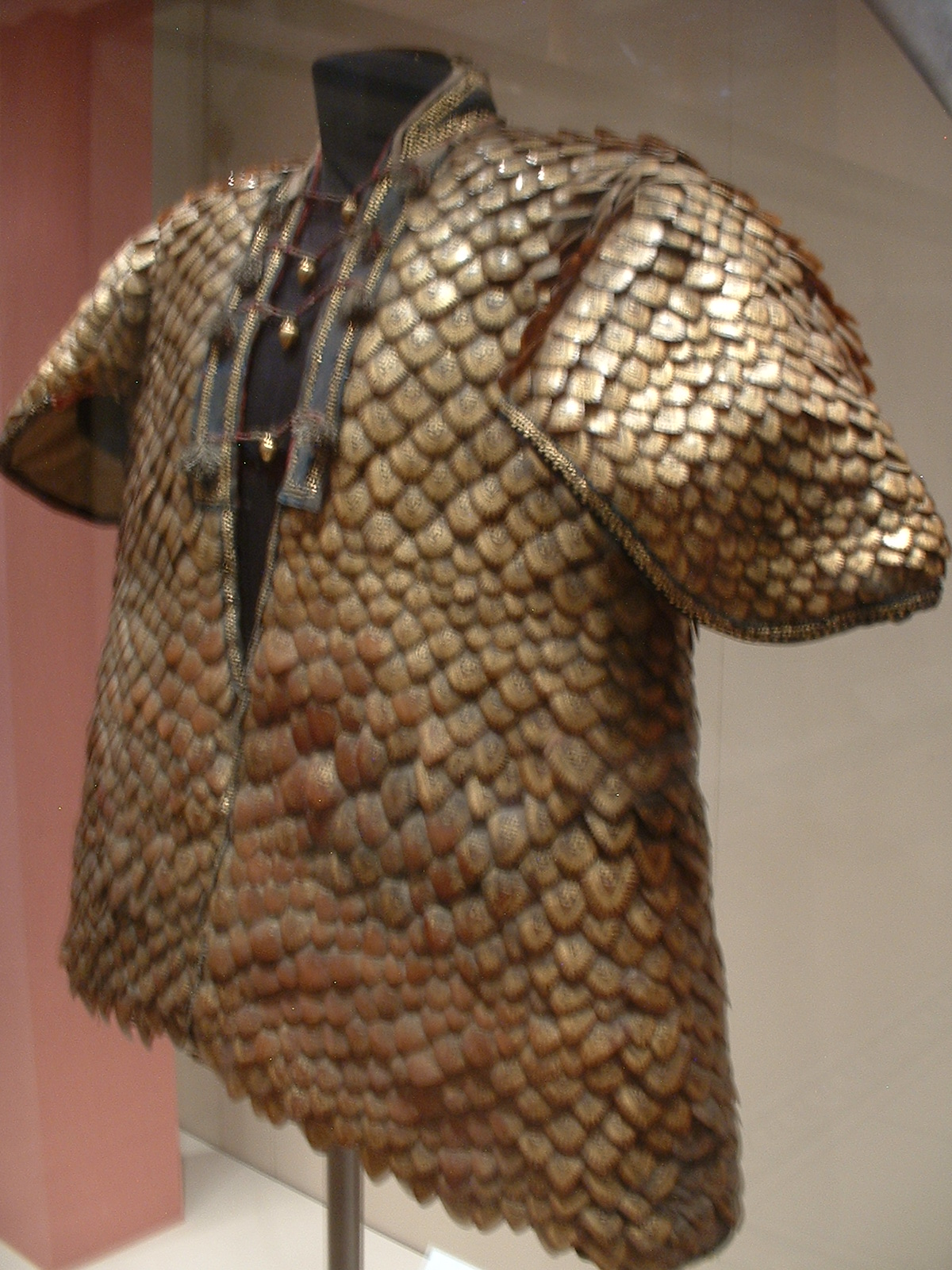
Coat covered with the gold decorated scales of the pangolin, Rajasthan, India, early 19th century.

=== Mughal armour ===
In the 16th century the armour in the Indian subcontinent incorporated mail and plate armour. Armour such as chainmail and scale mail are widely used by the Mughals called zirah baktar.

Kulah khud helmets were decorated with a wide degree of variations depending on the cultures from which they were created despite their similar designs. Decorations often appeared in the skull and the nasal bar, which were often heavily decorated with patterned motifs of inlaid brass, silver or gold; or decorated with figurative images. One Mughal top helmet featured calligraphic inscriptions from the Quran, supposedly to gain "Help from Allah and a speedy victory." A top discovered in Gwalior, India, featured a motif of the skull and crossbones sign of European influence. Another part of the Khula Khud helmet that was often a focus of artistic decoration, was the leaf-shaped finials of the nasal bar. A Sikh top featured the figure of Ganesha carved onto the nasal bar. The Khula Khud helmet was only decorated with some metals, and usually no organic decorations.

The Durrani and Sikh Empire recorded using mail and plate armour and helmets reminiscent of Mughal armour. The Maratha army employed similar armour for their infantry, while the cavalry was usually lightly armoured wearing leather armour.

The use of mail and plate armour in India declined in the 18th century due to the advent of gunpowder. Mail and plate armour in battle was last documented during the Battle of Plassey in 1757.
