= Simon von Geldern =

German traveler and author

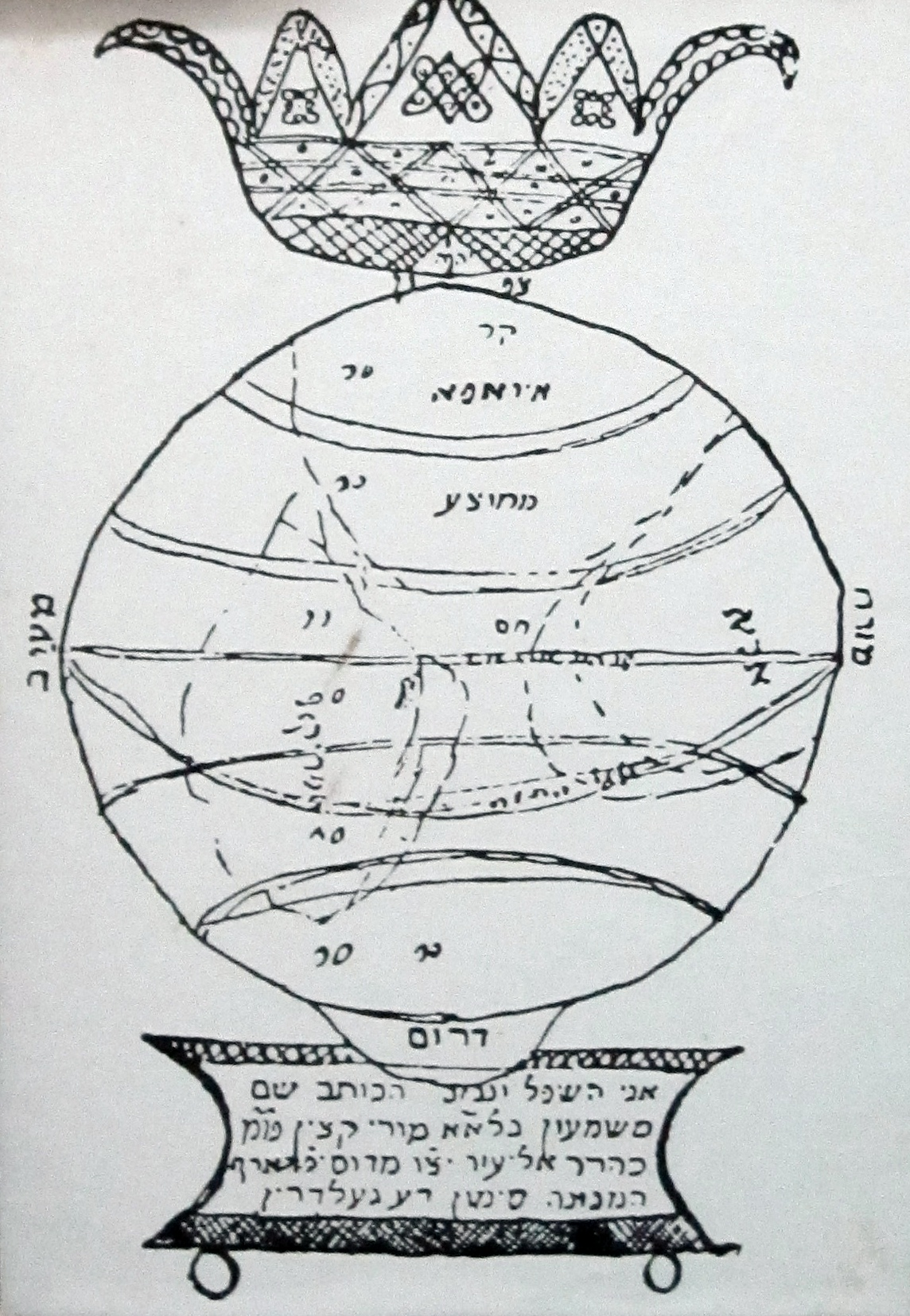
Drawing of the globe from Von Geldern's diary

Simon von Geldern (1720–1774) was a German traveler and author.

He was born into a wealthy family of Court Jews. Born in Düsseldorf, he became an adventurer, poet, gambler, and a traveler to the Middle East.

He was the great-uncle of Heinrich Heine, who describes him in his "Memoirs" as an adventurer and Utopian dreamer. The cognomen "Oriental" was given him because of his long journeys in Oriental countries. He spent many years in the maritime cities in the north of Africa and in the Moroccan states, there learning the trade of armorer, which he carried on with success.

Von Geldern made a pilgrimage to Jerusalem, and during an ecstasy of prayer, while upon Mount Moriah, he had a vision. Subsequently, he was chosen by an independent tribe of Bedouins on one of the oases of the North-African desert as their leader or sheikh, and thus became the captain of a band of marauders. He next visited the European courts, and subsequently took refuge in England to escape the consequences of the discovery of his too gallant relations with a lady of high birth. He pretended to have a secret knowledge of the Kabbalah, and issued a pamphlet in French verse entitled "Moïse sur Mont Horeb", probably having reference to the above-mentioned vision.

== See also ==
- Heine
- Geldern
- Gustav Heine von Geldern
- Robert von Heine-Geldern
