= Ochre Coloured Pottery culture =

Bronze Age culture of the Indo-Gangetic Plain

- Ochre Coloured Pottery finds ( c.2600 - 1200 BCE )
- Geographical range: North India
- Period: Bronze Age
- Dates: c. 2000–1500 BCE
- Major sites: Ahichchhatra; Bahadrabad; Bargaon; Bisauli; Fatehgarh; Hastinapur; Hulas; Jhinjhana; Katpalon; Kausambi; Mitathal; Red fort Sinauli
- Characteristics: Extensive copper metallurgy Burials with pots and copper weapons
- Preceded by: Neolithic
- Followed by: Black and red ware Painted Grey Ware culture

The Ochre Coloured Pottery culture (OCP) is a Bronze Age culture of the Indo-Gangetic Plain "generally dated 2000–1500 BCE," extending from eastern Punjab to northeastern Rajasthan and western Uttar Pradesh.

Artefacts of this culture show similarities with both the Late Harappan culture and the Vedic culture. Archaeologist Akinori Uesugi considers it as an archaeological continuity of the previous Harappan Bara style, while according to Parpola, the find of carts in this culture may reflect an Indo-Iranian migration into the Indian subcontinent, in contact with Late Harappans. The OCP marked the last stage of the North Indian Bronze Age and was succeeded by the Painted Grey Ware culture and then Northern Black polished ware.

== Geography and dating ==
Ochre Coloured Pottery culture during Indus Valley Civilization, Late Phase (1900-1300 BCE)

The 'Ochre Coloured Pottery culture is "generally dated 2000-1500 BCE," Early specimens of the characteristic ceramics found near Jodhpura, Rajasthan, date from the 3rd millennium (this Jodhpura is located in the district of Jaipur and should not be confused with the city of Jodhpur). Several sites of culture flourish along the banks of Sahibi River and its tributaries such as Krishnavati River and Soti River, all originating from the Aravalli Range and flowing from south to north-east direction towards Yamuna before disappearing in Mahendragarh district of Haryana. The OCP sites of Atranjikhera, Lal Qila, Jhinjhana and Nasirpur are dated to from 2600 to 1200 BC.

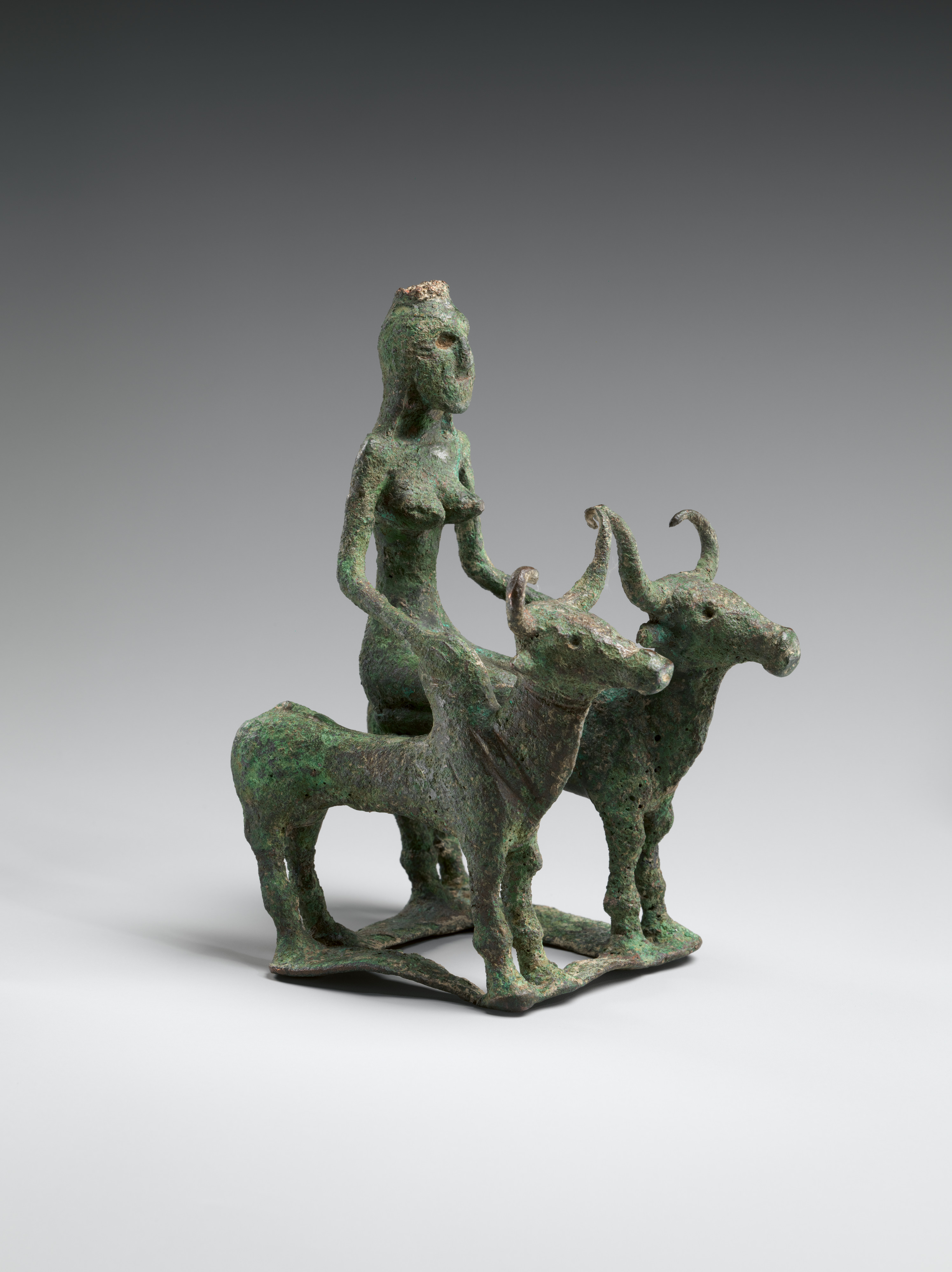
Woman Riding Two Bulls (bronze), from Kausambi, c.2000-1750 BCE

The culture reached the Gangetic plain in the early 2nd millennium. Recently, the Archaeological Survey of India discovered copper axes and some pieces of pottery in its excavation at the Saharanpur district of Uttar Pradesh.

== Pottery ==
The pottery had a red slip but gave off an ochre color on the fingers of archaeologists who excavated it, hence the name. It was sometimes decorated with black painted bands and incised patterns. It is often found in association with copper hoards, which are assemblages of copper weapons and other artifacts such as anthropomorphic figures.

== Agriculture ==
OCP culture was rural and agricultural, characterized by cultivation of rice, barley, and legumes, and domestication of cattle, sheep, goats, pigs, horses, and dogs. Most sites were small villages in size, but densely distributed. Houses were typically made of wattle-and-daub. Other artifacts include animal and human figurines, and ornaments made of copper and terracotta.

== Copper hoards ==
Cemetery H, Late Harappan, OCP, Copper Hoard and Painted Grey ware sites

The term copper hoards refers to different assemblages of copper-based artefacts in the northern areas of the Indian subcontinent that are believed to date from the 2nd millennium BC. Few derive from controlled excavations and several different regional groups are identifiable: southern Haryana/northern Rajasthan, the Ganges-Yamuna plain, Chota Nagpur, and Madhya Pradesh, each with their characteristic artefact types. Initially, the copper hoards were known mostly from the Ganges-Yamuna doab and most characterizations dwell on this material.

Characteristic hoard artefacts from southern Haryana/northern Rajasthan include flat axes (celts), harpoons, double axes, and antenna-hilted swords. The doab has a related repertory. Artefacts from the Chota Nagpur area are very different; they seem to resemble ingots and are votive in character.

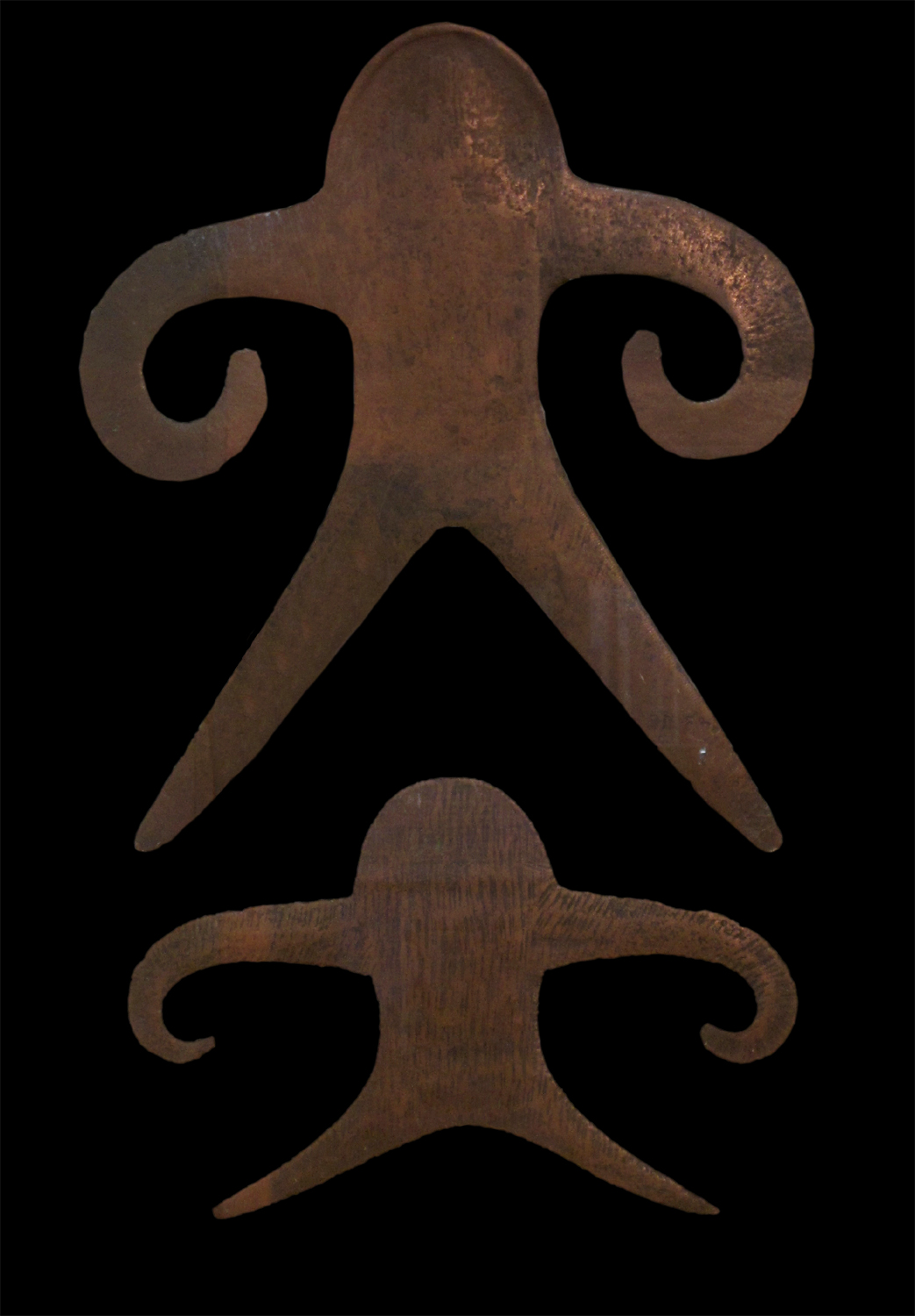
Anthropomorphic figures. Chalcolithic, Ganges-Yamuna basin, 2800-1500 BCE. Provenance: Bisauli (212 km from New Delhi), Badaun district, Uttar Pradesh

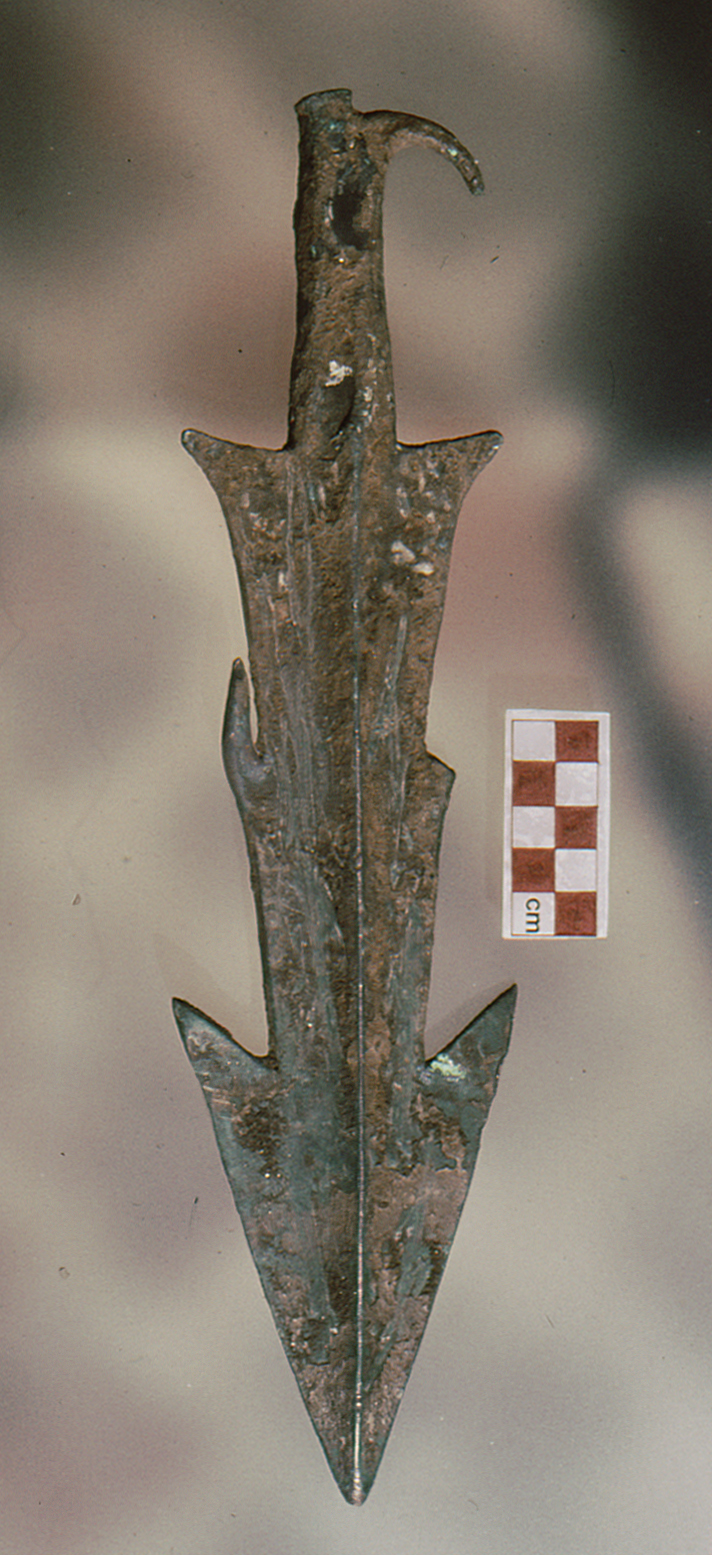
Indian Copper hoard artifact from Rewari

The raw material may have been derived from a variety of sources in Rajasthan (Khetri), Bihar, West Bengal, Odisha (especially Singhbhum), and Madhya Pradesh (Malanjkhand).

== Harappan Civilization and Indo-Iranians ==
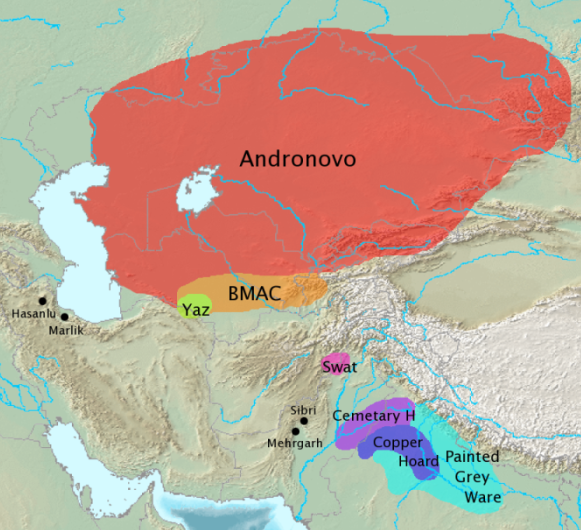
Archaeological cultures associated with Indo-Iranian migrations (after EIEC). The Andronovo, BMAC and Yaz cultures have often been associated with Indo-Iranian migrations. The GGC, Cemetery H, Copper Hoard and PGW cultures are candidates for cultures associated with Indo-Aryan movements.

Artefacts of this culture show similarities with both the Late Harappan culture and the Vedic culture.

Various opinions exist on the origins of the OCP. There are relations with the Late Harappan phase, and some consider it as a token of this culture. Others regard it to be an independent cultural style. Archaeologist Akinori Uesugi dates Ochre Coloured Pottery culture to c. 1900-1300 BCE, considering it as a Late Harappan expansion and archaeological continuity of the previous Bara style (c. 2300 and 1900 BCE), which was a regional culture of the Ghaggar valley rooted in the Indus Civilization, calling it the Bara-OCP cultural complex.

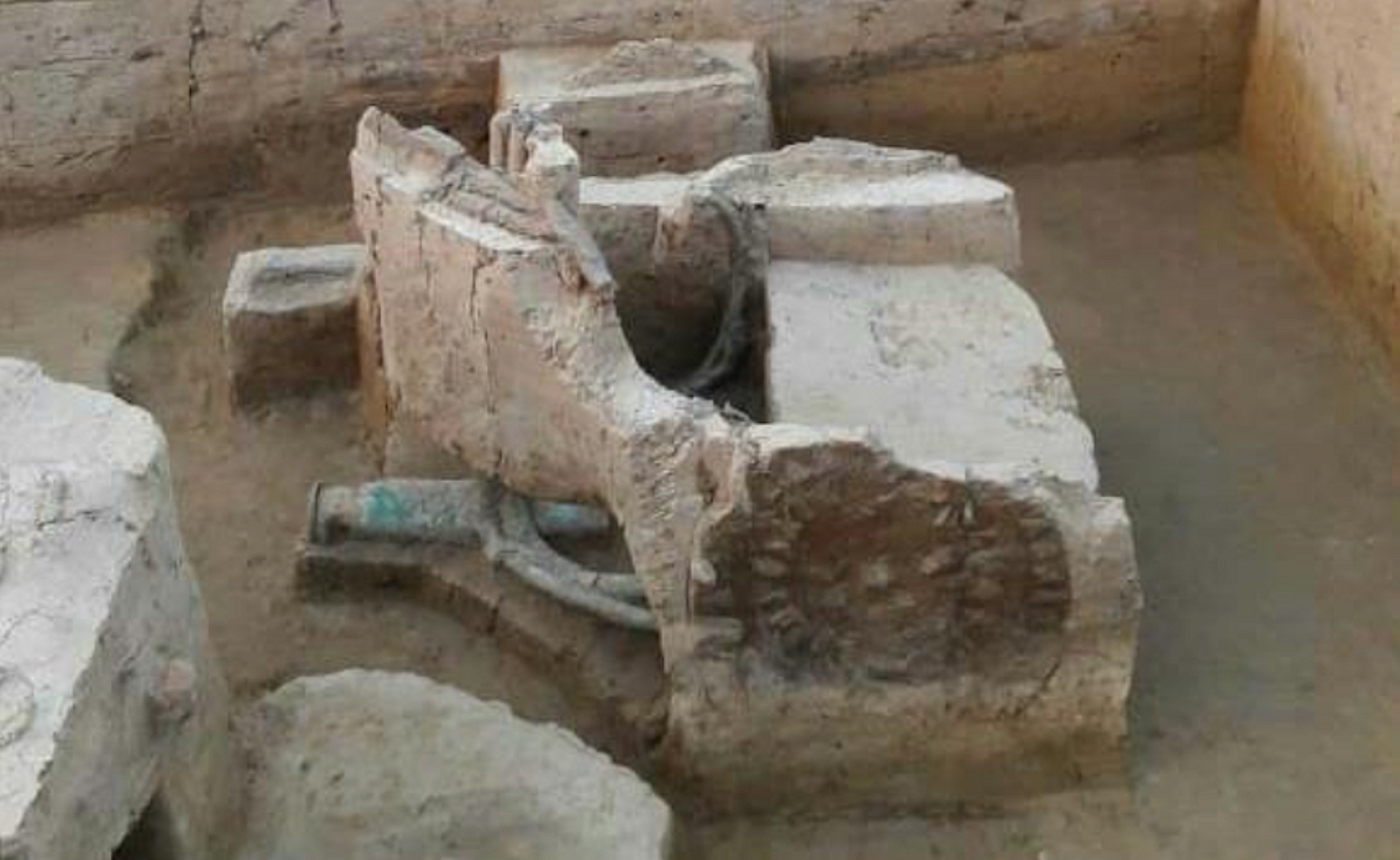
Sinauli ox cart, photograph of the Archaeological Survey of India.

While the ASI-archaeologists conducting the investigation describe the chariots buried as horse drawn chariots, similarities have been noted by Parpola between the use of carts, as attested in burial practices at Sinauli, and Indo-Iranian culture. Reflecting on these finds, Parpola rejects the identification of these carts as horse-pulled chariots, instead considering them to be ox-pulled carts and part of an early wave of Indo-Iranian settlers, coming into contact with Late Harappan culture:

It seems, then, that the earliest Aryan-speaking immigrants to South Asia, the Copper Hoard people, came with bull-drawn carts (Sanauli and Daimabad) via the BMAC and had Proto-Indo-Iranian as their language. They were, however, soon followed (and probably at least partially absorbed) by early Indo-Aryans.

According to Kumar, while the eastern OCP did not use Indus script, the whole of OCP had nearly the same material culture and likely spoke the same language throughout its expanse. OCP culture was a contemporary neighbor to Harappan civilization, and between 2500 BC and 2000 BC, the people of Upper Ganga valley were using Indus script.

== See also ==
- Kallur archaeological site
- Pottery in the Indian subcontinent

== Sources ==
- Gupta, S.P., ed. (1995), The lost Sarasvati and the Indus Civilization, Jodhpur: Kusumanjali Prakashan
- Gupta, Vinay; Mani, B.R. (2017). "Painted Grey Ware Culture: Changing Perspectives". Journal of Multidisciplinary Studies in Archaeology: 377–378.
- Kumar, Vijay (October 2017). "Archaeological Gazetteer of Aligarh & Hathras Districts with special reference to OCP & Other Proto-Historic Cultures of Indo-Gangetic Plains" (PDF). Indian Journal of Archaeology. 2 (4): 55–394. Archived from the original on 22 February 2021.
- Parpola, Asko (2020). "Royal "Chariot" burials of Sanauli near Delhi and Archaeological correlates of Prehistoric Indo-Iranian languages". Studia Orientalia Electronica. 8: 176. doi:10.23993/store.98032. S2CID 226331373.
- Sharma, Deo Prakash (2002), Newly Discovered Copper Hoard, Weapons of South Asia (C. 2800-1500 B.C.), Delhi: Bharatiya Kala Prakashan
- Singh, Upinder (2008), A History of Ancient and Early Medieval India From the Stone Age to the 12th Century, Pearson Education India, ISBN 9788131711200
- Yule, P. (1985), Metalwork of the Bronze Age in India, Munich: C.H. Beck, ISBN 3-406-30440-0
- Yule, P.; Hauptmann, A.; Hughes, M. (1992) [1989], "The Copper Hoards of the Indian Subcontinent: Preliminaries for an Interpretation", Jahrbuch des Römisch-Germanischen Zentralmuseums Mainz: 36, 193–275, ISSN 0076-2741
- Yule, Paul (2014), A New Prehistoric Anthropomorphic Figure from the Sharqiyah, Oman, in: 'My Life is like the Summer Rose' Maurizio Tosi e l'Archeologia come modo de vivere, Papers in Honour of Maurizio Tosi on his 70th Birthday, Oxford: BAR Intern. Series 2690
