= Southeast Asia Institute =

US research institute

The Southeast Asia Institute was an early academic institute devoted to Southeast Asian studies. It is said to be the first United States institution employing the term "Southeast Asia".

== History ==
The Institute was originally organized as the East Indies Institute of America, with Austrian scholar Robert Heine-Geldern playing a lead role in the formation. It was established on July 31, 1941, in New York City with a branch in Berkeley. Margaret Mead, Claire Holt, Raymond Kennedy, and Arthur Schiller served on its board.

By 1946 the Institute claimed a total of 326 members, and had changed its name by majority vote to make it "clear that the Institute's area of research and study comprises the East Indies, the Philippines, Malaya, Burma, Siam and Indo-China", as recorded in a special issue of the Far Eastern Quarterly (1946).

The Institute was later absorbed into the Association for Asian Studies.
