= Hulas =

- Archeological site
- Location within Uttar Pradesh
- Coordinates: 29°41′25″N 77°21′37″E
- State: Uttar Pradesh
- Time zone: UTC+5.30 (Indian Standard Time)

Hulas, located in the Saharanpur district of Uttar Pradesh, India, is a late Indus Valley Civilization archeological site.

== Historical significance ==
Hulas is one of the 70 odd sites belonging to Chalcolithic Culture Phase in Doab which are located mostly along the higher banks of tributaries of Yamuna, namely, Hindon River, Krishni, Kathanala and Maskara. Most of these settlements are small, the largest one measuring 200x200 m, and three of these sites are excavated (Hulas, Alamgirpur and Bargaon). Occupation of this late Harappan site goes back to 2000 BC and it seems it continued up to 1000 BC.

== Architecture ==
Rectangular mud structures with rammed floors, post-holes and hearths were identified in the earliest phase. In the Middle phase, clusters of two or three circular storage bin–type structures were found inside some of rectangular mud houses. Five round furnaces were found in some of the structures belonging to final phase.

== Artefacts found ==
Hand made and wheel made pottery with geometric or naturalistic designs painted in black, chert blades, bone points etc. Terrecotta inscribed sealing was also recovered from Hulas.

== Agricultural activity ==
Horse gram, Cow pea (which is of African origin), walnuts, oats, lintel, pea, chickpea, ragi, rice (both wild and cultivated variety) were grown at Hulas. Fruits of pipal tree (ficus religiosa) were also recovered from this site.

== See also ==
- Indus Valley Civilization
- List of Indus Valley Civilization sites
- List of inventions and discoveries of the Indus Valley Civilization
- Hydraulic engineering of the Indus Valley Civilization
