= Sinauli =

Archaeological site in Uttar Pradesh, India

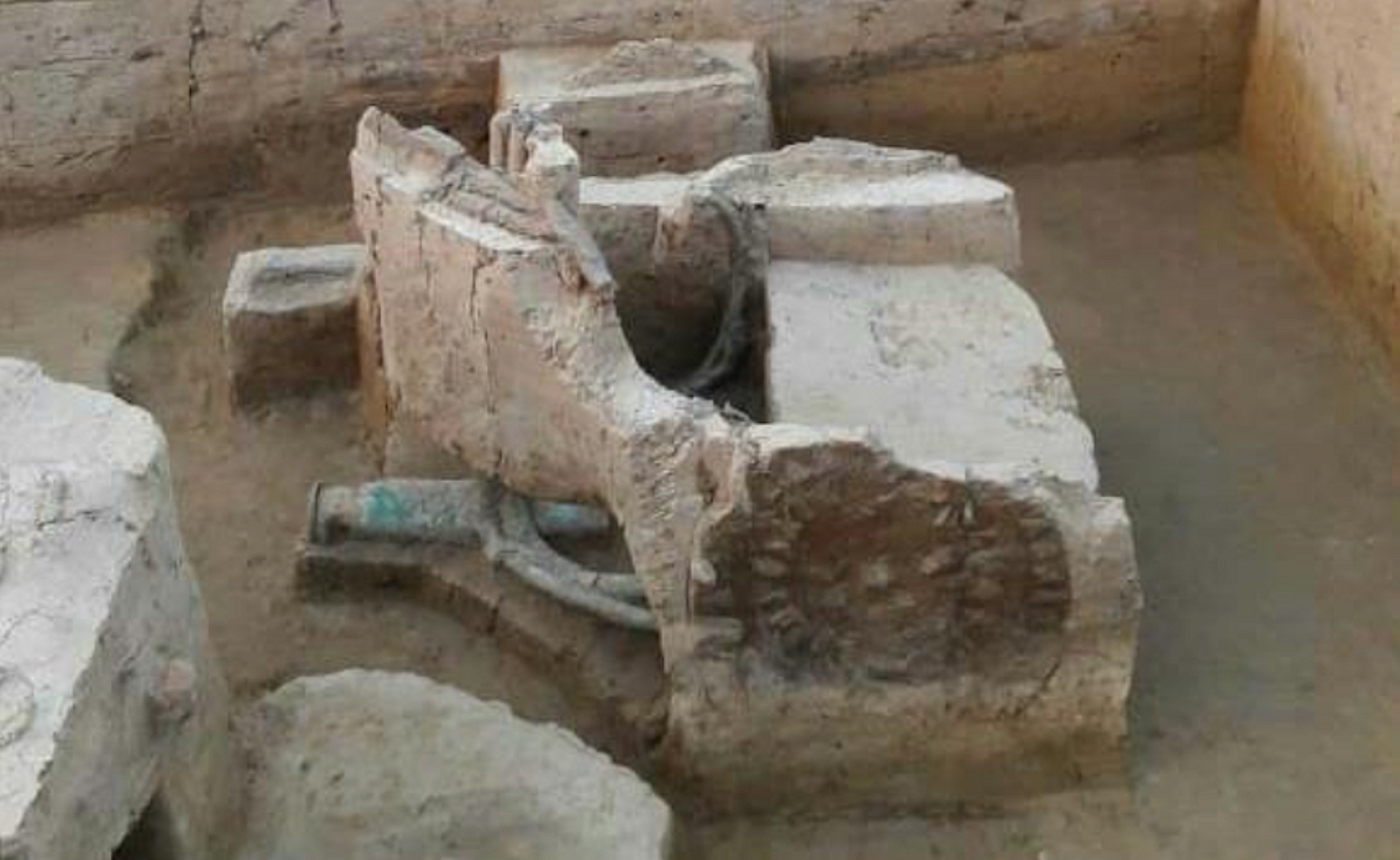
- Sinauli vehicle, photograph of the Archaeological Survey of India

- Location in Uttar Pradesh, India
- 29°14′46″N 77°21′03″E
- Type: Archaeological site
- Cultures: Late Harappan, Ochre Coloured Pottery culture/Copper Hoard Culture (Note: While S. K. Manjul regards the OCP to be a culture which developed independent from the (Late) Harappan culture, according to archaeologist Akinori Ochre Coloured Pottery culture (c. 1900-1300 BCE), to which Sinauli's burials belong, was a Late Harappan expansion of the previous Bara style (c. 2300-1900), a regional culture of the Harappan civilization from the Ghaggar valley, calling it the Bara-OCP cultural complex (Uesugi 2018, p. 6) Uesugi: "During the early second millennium BCE, the Bara-OCP (Ochre-Coloured pottery) cultural complex expanded from the Ghaggar valley to the western part of the Ganga valley. This cultural complex [...] has its origin rooted in the Indus Civilization in the preceding period, its eastward expansion indicates the colonization of the western Ganga valley probably giving great impetus to the Neolithic-Chalcolithic communities in the Ganga valley to transform into a more complex society" (Uesugi 2018, p. 6). On the origins of the Bara pottery, see also: Akinori Uesugi and Vivek Dangi (2017), A Study on the Developments of the Bara Pottery in the Ghaggar Plains. In K. Hetu (ed.), Essays in Prehistory, Protohistory and Historical Archaeology, Festschrift to Shri. K. N. Dikshit: 176–197. New Delhi New Bharatiya Book Corporation.)
- Location: Uttar Pradesh, India

History
- Founded: c. 2000 BCE
- Abandoned: c. 1500 BCE

Site notes
- Excavation dates: 2005-2006, 2018
- Archaeologists: D. V. Sharma; Sanjay Manjul
- Management: Archaeological Survey of India

Sinauli is an archaeological site in western Uttar Pradesh, India, at the Ganga-Yamuna Doab. The site gained attention for its Bronze Age solid-disk wheel vehicles, found in 2018, which were interpreted by some as horse-pulled "chariots". (Note: These carts dubbed as "chariots" does not however have any spokes on the wheels like the chariots (Sanskrit: Ratha) mentioned in Vedic literature (Parpola 2020, p. 185).)

The excavations in Sinauli were conducted by Archaeological Survey of India (ASI) from 2005-2006 and in mid-2018. The remains found in 2005–2006 season, the "Sanauli cemetery", belong to the Late Bronze Age, and were ascribed by excavation director Sharma to the Harappan civilisation, though a Late Harappan Phase or post-Harappan identification is more likely.

Major findings from trial excavations are dated from c. 2000 - c. 1500 BCE, and ascribed to the Ochre Coloured Pottery culture (OCP)/Copper Hoard Culture, which was contemporaneous with the Late Harappan culture. They include several wooden coffin burials, copper swords, helmets, and wooden carts, with solid disk wheels and protected by copper sheets. The carts were presented by Sanjay Manjul, director of the excavations, as chariots, (Note: Jyoti (2018): "On being asked whether bull or horse was used in chariots, Manjul said, “This is debatable, it could be a bull or a horse, but having said that the preliminary understanding points to the horse. The chariot is a lookalike of the ones found in its contemporary cultures like Mesopotamia. It is a solid wheel with no spokes.") and he further notes that "the rituals relating to the Sanauli burials showed close affinity with Vedic rituals."

Several scholars have noted that solid wheels belong to carts, not chariots. According to Asko Parpola, these finds were ox-pulled carts, indicating that these burials are related to an early Aryan migration of Proto-Indo-Iranian speaking people into the Indian subcontinent, "forming then the ruling elite of a major Late Harappan settlement."

== Excavations ==
The site at Sinauli was accidentally discovered by people levelling agricultural land. The farmers came across human skeletons and ancient pottery. The ASI began excavations at the site in September 2005.

=== 2005–2006 excavations ===
The 2005-2006 excavation headed by D. V. Sharma, ASI found more than a hundred burials (no coffins) tentatively dated c. 2200–1800 BCE. Sharma associated the finding with the Indus Valley Civilisation, which has been contested, as a Late Harappan or post-Harappan identification is more likely. (Note: Eram Agha: "The horse driven chariots are known in the Vedic period, said historian DN Jha. "However, iron makes appearance in the post Vedic or not earlier than the late Vedic period. This find cannot be dated to the pre-Vedic/Harappa phase," said Jha.") Carbon dating has now confirmed that the burials date back to c. 1865-1507 BCE, based on three samples: 3,500, 3,815, and 3,457 BP, with a margin of error of 295 years.

The burials are all oriented in a NW-SE direction and most are identified as primary burials. Some of the burials are identified as secondary, multiple and symbolic burials. The age of the buried starts from 1–2 years and includes all age groups and both male and female. Grave goods generally consisted of odd number of vases/bowls (3, 5, 7, 9, 11 etc.) placed near the head, with dish-on-stand usually placed below the hip area as well as flask-shaped vessels, terracotta figurines, gold bracelets and copper bangles, beads of semi-precious stones (two necklaces of long barrel shape), steatite, faience, and glass.

The two antennae swords from Sinauli, one found in situ in a grave with a copper sheath, has similarities to the Copper Hoard Type in a Late Harappan context. A dish-on-stand and a violin-shaped flat copper container (having nearly 35 arrowhead shaped copper pieces placed in a row) are included in other important grave goods from Sinauli. The survey found that a dish-on-stand was usually placed below the hip area, but in some cases was placed near the head or feet. The stand is holding the head of a goat in one case.

Remains of a burnt brick wall with a finished inner surface ran along the eastern side of the burial.

=== 2018 excavations ===
"The [2018] artefacts probably belong to a period between 2000-1800 BCE. It can help us determine how those people lived... It may help re-evaluate how we understood the Late Harappan contemporary culture."

— S. K. Manjul, ASI director (excavations)

Trial excavations conducted at Sinauli in March–May 2018 (about 100 m from the 2005-2006 site) have yielded the remains of several coffin burials and three full-sized carts. Prior to obtaining C-14 dates, Sanjay Manjul, ASI director (excavations), surmised the burials belonged to the period c. 2000 - 1800 BCE, contemporaneous with, but different from, the Late Harappan culture but belonging to the Ochre-coloured pottery (OCP)/Copper Hoard Culture. Carbon dating later confirmed the organic matter from the burial site to be 3,500 ± 127 years old while the oldest soil-sediments were 4,798 ± 34 years old, most likely due to mixing of older carbon from the lower levels of cultural sequence, as this was the burial site and had more probability of sediment relocation due to burial activities. Other discoveries include copper helmets, copper antenna swords, copper swords, a ladle made of copper, grey-ware pottery, large terracotta pots, red vases with flaring rims, copper nails and beads. Wooden coffins were first discovered at Harappa in Punjab and then from Dholavira in Gujarat. Local youths, after being given a basic training, were also enlisted into the excavation activities by the ASI.

==== Coffin Burial finds ====
Seven human burials - including three coffin burials - have been excavated by the ASI at Sinauli in 2018. In all burials the head was found to be on the northern side, with pottery beyond the head and on the south after the feet. The copper objects are kept below the "sarcophagi."

Coffin Burial I: Primary burial (2.4 meters long and 40 cm high). Alongside two full-sized carts. No remains of a draught animal(s) - horse or bull - is found. The wooden parts of the coffin are decomposed. The wooden coffin stands on four wooden legs. The entire coffin, including legs, is covered with copper sheets (3mm thickness) on all sides. The sides of the coffin have running floral motifs. The copper sheet on the legs also has intricate carvings. The coffin lid has eight motifs carved (high relief) on it. It depicts either a person with a headgear (made of two bull horns and a pipal leaf in the centre) or a bull head.

Body of an adult man inside the coffin: oriented in NW-SE direction (head facing NW).

Vehicles: the vehicles have two solid wheels (not spoked), which has led to some scholars interpreting them as carts. The wheels rotated on a fixed axle linked by a shaft to the yoke. The chassis of the two cart are made of wood and covered with thick copper sheets. The wheels are decorated with triangles made of copper (fastened on the wheel with copper nails). The triangles are distributed in three concentric circles from the hub flange of the wheel. The seat seemed to semi-circular. The frame of the seat is made of copper pipes. A pipe for the attachment of the umbrella is also visible.

Coffin Burial II: The third cart was found with another wood coffin burial. The pit also included a shield (decorated with geometrical patterns in copper), a torch, an antenna sword, a digger, hundreds of beads and a variety of pots. The cart, unlike the ones found in the other two, has (copper triangle) decorations on the pole and yoke.

Coffin Burial III: Skeleton of a woman (primary burial, coffin burial with no copper lid): wearing an armlet (made of banded agate beads around the elbow). Burial goods: 10 red vases with flared rims, four bowls, two basins, a thin "symbolic" antenna sword, bow and arrows.

==== Interpretation of the Coffin Burial finds ====
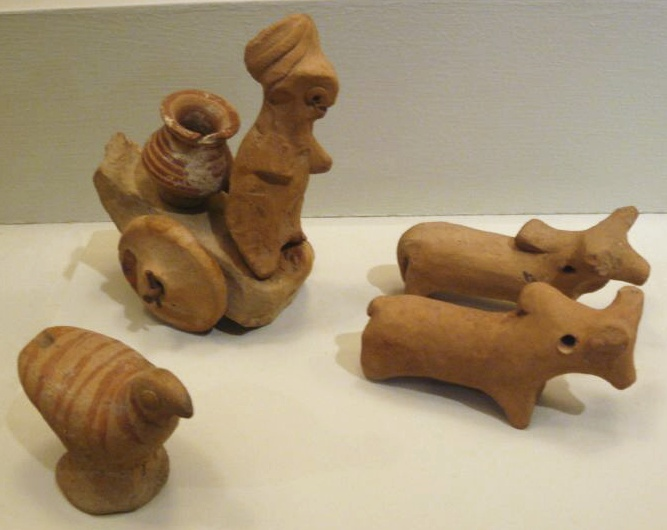
Miniature votive images or toys from Harappa, c. 2500 BCE. Clay figurines of zebu oxen, a cart, and a chicken.

The vehicles were presented by Sanjay Kumar Manjul, director of the excavations and of ASI, as chariots used in war, similar to Indo-Aryan technology. According to Manjul, "For the first time in the Indian subcontinent, chariots have been recovered from any excavation," coming from a royal burial from the Ochre Coloured Pottery (OCP)/Copper Hoard Culture. Manjul further noted that "the rituals relating to the Sanauli burials showed close affinity with Vedic rituals," and stated that "the dating of the Mahabharata is around 1750 BCE."

Suggesting the presence of horses in India before the arrival of the Indo-Aryans, some see this as a challenge to the Indo-Aryan migration theory. (Note: Bhatnagar et al. (2024) refer to the Indo-Aryan migration theory as "the Aryan invasion theory", an outdated name typically used in a rhetoric and misleading way by proponents of Indigenous Aryanism.) However, the identification as "chariot" is problematic, since the wheels were solid, not spoked as in chariots. This would require oxen to pull the heavy carts, which were unfit for use in battle, in contrast to the horse-pulled chariots introduced by the Indo-Aryans. (Note: There is a strong scholarly consensus that horses were brought to India, and the claim that horses were present in India before the arrival of the Indo-Aryans is widely disbelieved by scholars.)

According to Michael Witzel, rejecting the identification as chariots, "[t]his find may point to the survival of an extra-Harappan organized society." According to Asko Parpola, the carts must have been ox-pulled, and are indications of an early Aryan migration of Proto-Indo-Iranian speaking people from the Sintashta culture into the Indian subcontinent, "forming then the ruling elite of a major Late Harappan settlement," predating the migrations of pre- and proto-Rig Vedic people. Parpola:

It seems, then, that the earliest Aryan-speaking immigrants to South Asia, the Copper Hoard people, came with bull-drawn carts (Sanauli and Daimabad) via the BMAC and had Proto-Indo-Iranian as their language. They were, however, soon followed (and probably at least partially absorbed) by early Indo-Aryans [...] The dramatic new discovery of cart burials dated to c. 1900 at Sanauli [...] support my proposal of a pre-Ṛgvedic wave (now set of waves) of Aryan speakers arriving in South Asia and their making contact with the Late Harappans.

According to historian Ruchika Sharma, Jawaharlal Nehru University,

We should first obtain clarity on why ASI is calling them 'chariots'. It isn't uncommon for a Late Harappan site to have bullock carts. There is already evidence of such terracotta carts [...] ASI has a tendency to colour their discoveries from the lens of Hindutva. They had earlier interpreted female figures as 'mother goddesses', even though there was no evidence to suggest it. (Note: See also Friese (2019, p. 127-128): "In march 2018, a Reuters report revealed details of a meeting of a 'History Committee' convened by Mahesh Sharma at the office of the Director General of the Archeological Survey of India (ASI) in january 2017. Its task, according to the committee chairman K.N. Dixit, was 'to present a report that will help the government rewrite certain aspects of ancient history'. The minutes of the meeting apparently 'set out its aims: to use evidence such as archaeological finds and DNA to prove that today's Hindus are directly descended from the land's first inhabitants many thousands of years ago, and make the case that ancient Hindu scriptures are fact, not myth.'" The Reuters report refers to Rupam Jain, Tom Lasseter (march 6, 2018), Special Report: By rewriting history, Hindu nationalists aim to assert their dominance over India. For the influence of Hindutva-thought on Indian archaeology, see also: * Humes, Cynthia Ann (2012), "Hindutva, Mythistory, and Pseudoarchaeology", Numen, 59 (2/3): 178–201, doi:10.1163/156852712X630770, JSTOR 23244958 * Etter, Anne-Julie (2020), "Creating Suitable Evidence of the Past? Archaeology, Politics, and Hindu Nationalism in India from the End of the Twentieth Century to the Present", South Asia Multidisciplinary Academic Journal, 24/25, doi:10.4000/samaj.6926)

The finds have also been popularly associated with the Hindu Epics, as the carts evoke similarities with chariots in the Epic narratives, and local legends tell that Sinauli is one of the five villages that Krishna unsuccessfully negotiated with the Kaurava princes to avoid the War at Kurukshetra.

== See also ==
- Chandayan
- Mahabharata

== Works cited ==
- Agha, Eram (5 June 2018). "In a First, Chariot From Pre-Iron Age Found During Excavation in UP's Sanauli". news18.com.
- "Excavations - 2006–2007". Archaeological Survey of India. 2007.
- Bhatnagar, Manoj Kumar; Manjul, Sanjay Kumar; Parmar, Rina; Kumar, Dharmendra (2024). "Restoration, preservation, and interpretation of the royal chariot from the Sinauli excavation in India: Safeguarding a remarkable discovery" (PDF). Arts & Communication. 2024;2(4):2437: 2437. doi:10.36922/ac.2437.
- Daniyal, Shoaib (14 June 2018). "Putting the horse before the cart: What the discovery of 4,000-year-old 'chariot' in UP signifies". Scroll.in.
- Friese, Kai (2019). "The Complications of Genetics". Which Of Us Are Aryans. ALEPH.
- Jyoti, Archana (5 June 2018). "2000BC chariots set to redefine Mahabharata age". Daily Pioneer.
- Kumar, Vijay (2020). "A note on Chariot Burials found at Sinauli district Baghpat U.P." (PDF). Indian Journal of Archaeology: 735–755. Archived from the original (PDF) on 23 January 2022.
- Narayanan, P. M. (11 June 2018). "ASI-Excavated Sanauli Chariots Have Potential To Challenge Aryan Invasion Theory". Outlook India.
- Parpola, Asko (2020). "Royal "Chariot" Burials of Sanauli near Delhi and Archaeological Correlates of Prehistoric Indo-Iranian Languages". Studia Orientalia Electronica. 8: 175–198. doi:10.23993/store.98032.
- Sharma, Shalini; et al. (30 September 2024). "Royal burials and chariots from Sinauli (Uttar Pradesh, India): Radiocarbon dating and isotopic analysis based inferences". Radiocarbon. 66 (4): 774–782. Bibcode:2024Radcb..66..774S. doi:10.1017/RDC.2024.89.
- Singh, Upinder (2008). A History of Ancient and Early Medieval India: From the Stone Age to the 12th Century. Delhi: Pearson Education India. ISBN 9788131711200.
- Subramanian, T. S. (12 September 2018). "From the Bara culture: R.S. Bisht". Frontline. The Hindu.
- Subramanian, T. S. (28 September 2018). "Royal burial in Sanauli". Frontline. The Hindu.
- Uesugi, Akinori (2018), "An Overview on the Iron Age in South Asia", Abstracts for the International Symposium on the Iron Age in South Asia, June 2 and 3, 2018, at Kansai University, Osaka
- Venugopal, Vasudha (20 October 2019). "Mahabharata much older, say ASI Archaeologists". The Economic Times.
- "ASI Claims to Have Found Harappan-Era 'Chariots' at Excavation Site in UP". The Wire. 8 June 2018.
- Witzel, Michael (2019). "Early ' Aryans' and their neighbors outside and inside India". Journal of Biosciences. 44 (3) 58: 1–10. doi:10.1007/s12038-019-9881-7. PMID 31389347. S2CID 195804491.
