= Kallur archaeological site =

- Village
- Location within Karnataka
- Coordinates: 16°8′23.54″N 77°12′17.47″E
- Country: India
- State: Karnataka
- District: Raichur district
- Taluk: Manvi
- Founder: Anil kumar M

Government
  - Type: Panchayati raj
  - Body: Gram panchayat

Population (2001)
  - Total: 10,447
- Demonym: kallurigaru

Languages
  - Official: Kannada
- Time zone: UTC+5:30 (IST)
- PIN: 584118
- Telephone code: 08538
- ISO 3166 code: IN-KA
- Vehicle registration: KA-36
- Website: karnataka.gov.in

Kallur or Kallūru is an archaeological site and village located in the Manvi taluk of Raichur district in the state of Karnataka, India. It belongs to Gulbarga division. The site came into prominence with the discovery of antennae swords in the 1930s, which was the first instance of the Copper Hoard culture being discovered in South India. The earliest finding here has been dated to the Neolithic period.

== Etymology ==
The word Kallur is formed from two Kannada words: kallu which means "stone" and ooru which means "town". The number of granite hillocks that surround Kallur, may have given the place its name. Some of the hillocks that are present here are Yammigudda, Pirbannur, Agsargudda, Kampangudda and Polannagudda.

== Excavation history ==
The site was first excavated in 1939–40 by M. Khwaja Ahmed of the Archaeological Department of Hyderabad state. It was later explored by F. Raymond Allchin in 1952.

== Findings ==
=== Swords ===
Villagers living around Kallur discovered three antennaed swords under a boulder on Pirbannur hillock in the 1930s. The swords were made of cast copper with the longest sword being 38 1/2 inches (98 cm) in length and the shortest sword being 26 3/4 inches (68 cm) in length. The antennae of these swords was about 6–7 cm in length. These swords are similar to the ones found in the sites of Copper Hoard culture in North India, like Fatehgarh, and hence provide the first instance of such a site being found in South India. Robert von Heine-Geldern postulated that these swords were influenced by the Koban culture, but the Indian archaeologist B. B. Lal disagreed.

=== Paintings ===
On the Yammigudda hillock; buffaloes, miniature bulls and a man have been found painted over a rock face. Russet-coated painted ware have also been found here.

=== Objects ===
Other objects found here include cores of chert, jasper and chalcedony, stone axes, red ware, shell bangles and beads of semi precious stones. Presence of iron ore and quartzite provide the evidence that iron smelting in a crude form was performed here. Coins of the Satavahana period have also been found here.

== See also ==
- Pottery in the Indian subcontinent
- Raichur district
- Manvi
