= Bargaon (archaeological site) =

Bargaon is an archaeological site of the Indus Valley Civilisation. It is in Saharanpur District, Uttar Pradesh, India.

== Late Harappan ==
This site belongs to the late Harappan period, with a mixture of Ochre Coloured Pottery.

== See also ==
- Indus Valley Civilization
- List of Indus Valley Civilization sites
