= Copper Hoard culture =

Find-complexes in the western Ganges-Yamuna doab in the Indian subcontinent

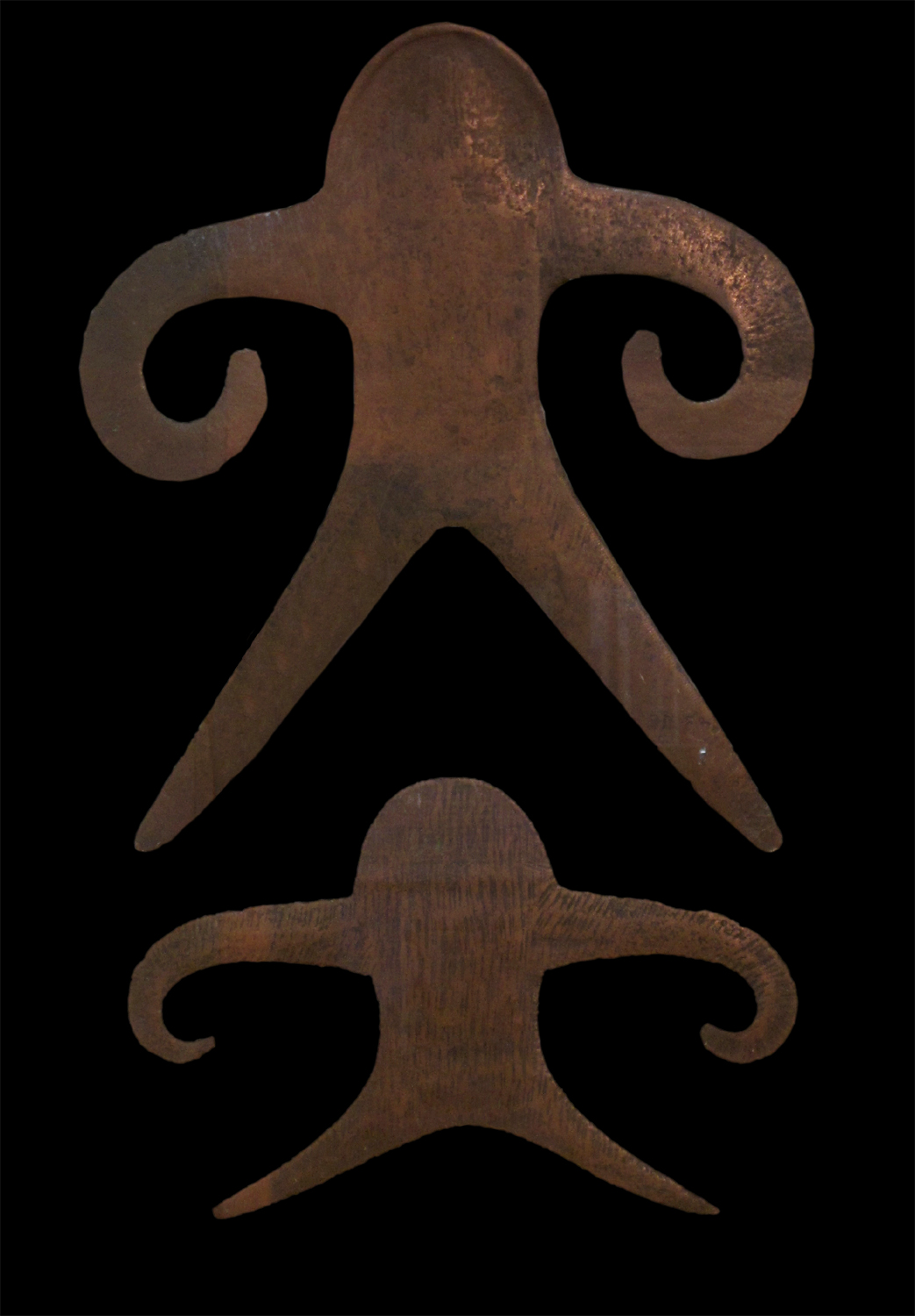
Anthropomorphic figures. Chalcolithic, Ganges–Yamuna basin, 2800–1500 BCE. Provenance: Bisauli (212 km from New Delhi), Badaun district, Uttar Pradesh

Copper Hoard culture describes find-complexes which mainly occur in the western Ganges–Yamuna doab in the northern part of the Indian subcontinent. They occur in hoards large and small, and are dated to the first half of the 2nd millennium BCE, (Note: Also published as Yule (2004) and Yule (2014).) although very few derive from controlled and dateable excavation contexts. The copper hoards are associated with the Ochre Coloured Pottery (OCP), which is closely associated with the Late Harappan (or Posturban) phase of the IVC. Associations with the Indo-Aryan of the second millennium BCE have also been proposed, though association with the Vedic Aryans is problematic, since the hoards are found east of the territory of the Vedic Aryans.

== Artefacts ==
=== Historical finds ===
The Copper Hoard finds occur mainly in Yamuna–Ganges doab of the northern part of the Indian subcontinent, and are dated to the first half of the 2nd millennium BCE, As early as the 19th century, stray hoard objects became known and established themselves as an important find group in the two-river land of northern India. The first Indian Copper Hoard harpoon was published in 1822. In 1951 B. B. Lal published 35 artefacts from the Gangetic basin, from the central peninsula and the eastern part of India. In 1985 Paul Alan Yule published 1083 examples from 'Copper Hoards' but also other peninsular prehistoric metal finds. These added a new group: those from southern Haryana and northern Rajasthan. By 1992, 284 further examples followed specifically of the Copper Hoard types.

Several hoard artifacts have turned up without an archaeological context, which raises doubts about their authenticity. Although on their discovery frequently questioned, today few voice doubts about the four Daimabad copper finds.

The different assemblages are known mostly by only their metallic artifacts, and thus the term 'culture' is misleading. Many finds are deposited in the Kanya Gurukul museum in Narela/Haryana.

Selected hoard artifacts from 1-2 South Haryana, 3-4 Uttar Pradesh, 5 Madhya Pradesh, 6-8 South Bihar-North Orissa-Bengalen.

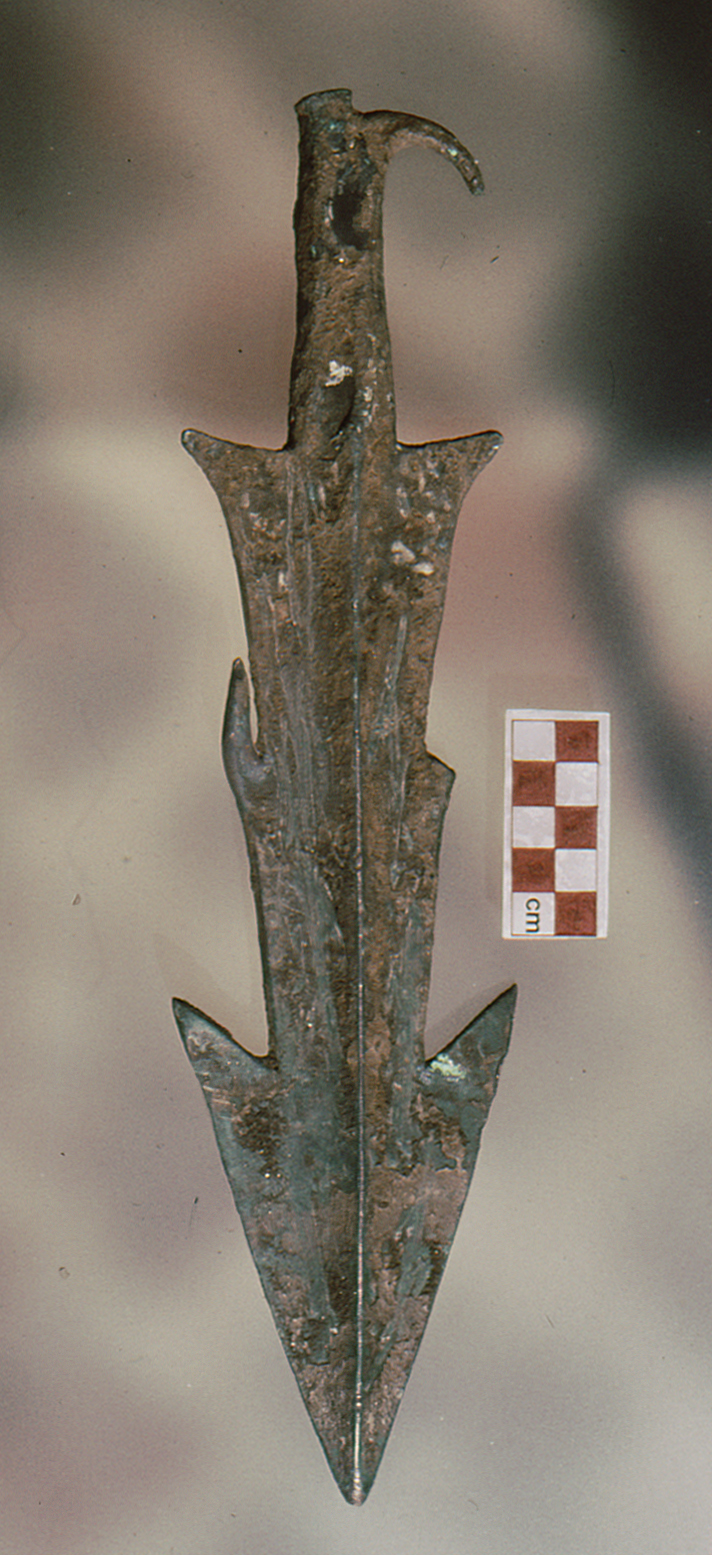
Indian Copper hoard artifact from Rewari, Haryana is probably not a use-object but more likely had a religious function.

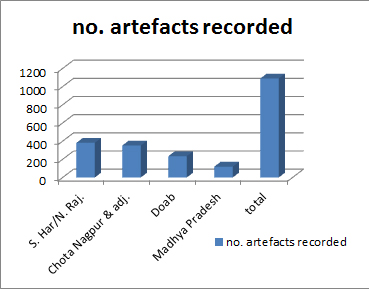
Recorded Indian Copper hoards objects, statistic.

=== Regional find-groups ===
Four regional find-groups are identifiable with their characteristic find-types:

- Characteristic hoard-finds from South Haryana/North Rajasthan (recorded: 383) include flat axes, harpoons, double axes, swords with so-called antenna grips and others.
- In the Ganges-Yamuna Doab (235) related types occur.
- Those from Chota Nagpur differ (235) entirely from these. They include finely worked pieces, and mostly look at first like axe-heads but are probably ingots.
- Fewer are those known from Madhya Pradesh (120), although originally there were some 424 from the Ghangharia hoard alone.

Of the four find groups, the largest number derives from southern Haryana, especially from Hansi, 120 km west of Delhi These are purchases and are not excavated. R.A.E. Coningham believes that one of the largest hoards is that from Daimabad with 60 kg. It is an isolated contemporary phenomenon with little to do with the four main find-groups. Several writers do not distinguish between any early copper-based artefacts and the more narrowly defined Copper Hoards.

Artifacts from Al-Aqir, Oman, Lothal, Gujarat and Kallur, Karnataka also comprise other finding spots of the copper hoard culture.

=== Characteristics of the artefacts ===
The copper ore used derives from different ore ranges in Rajasthan (Khetri), southern Haryana, Bihar/West Bengal/Orissa (especially Singhbhum) as well as Madhya Pradesh (Malaj Khand), to judge from the proximity to the find spots.

Hoard objects contain from 78 to 99% copper. Six contain up to 32.9% iron. Artefacts from Haryana show the greatest chemical variation. Those from Ghangharia are chemically the most homogeneous. Variations in the amount of different constituent metals are considered to be unintentional. Harappan metallurgists seem better able to produce usable alloys.

Certain copper artifacts from the late 3rd millennium contexts in Oman resemble the anthropomorphs of the Indian Copper Hoards.

== Interpretations of the artefacts ==
Cemetery H, Late Harappan, OCP, Copper Hoard and Painted Grey ware sites.

Indus Valley Civilization, Late Phase (1900-1300 BCE)

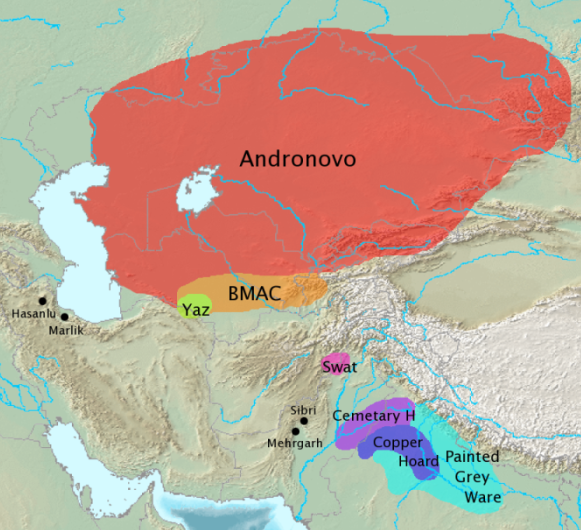
Archaeological cultures associated with Indo-Iranian migrations (after EIEC). The Andronovo, BMAC and Yaz cultures have often been associated with Indo-Iranian migrations. Some connection with the Copper Hoard culture is possible.

The copper hoards are associated with the Ochre Coloured Pottery (OCP), which is closely associated with the Late Harappan (or Posturban) phase of the IVC. They may also be associated with the Indo-Aryan migrants of the second millennium BCE, or with the BMAC, from where the Indo-Aryans came into India. The association with the Vedic Indo-Aryans is problematic, since the hoards are mostly found east of the territory of the Vedic Indo-Aryans. Falk proposes an association with the middle Vedic period and the realm of the Kuru-Pancalas, who had expanded eastwards. Asko Parpola associates the copper hoards with a first wave of Indo-Iranian migration into the Indian subcontinent, who reached farther east than the later Vedic Aryans.

An interpretation by D.P. Agrawal explains the anthropomorphs as throwing weapons, and they have been posited by Das Gupta to the basis of the vajra, a divine weapon of Indo-European origins fashioned for the Vedic and later Hindu deity Indra. However, these interpretations ignore the find circumstances of associated hoard objects, not to mention the weight (up to 7 kg) of certain examples. Considering the find circumstances and constituent hoard patterns, Yule found no evidence for a functional use, but interprets them as ritualistic objects.

Alternatively, Harry Falk associated the bar celts with the vajra. P. Kuznetsov also associates this artefact with the vajra of Indra, noting similarities with a symbolic cudgel-scepter found in a burial of the Yamnaya culture of the Eurasian steppes.

Zin acknowledges the possibility that CHC-objects may be related to Indo-European culture, stating "Falk’s identification of the vajra as a bar-celt seems to be the right one; the Avestan word vazra means a ‘hammer’." She disputes the association with Indra's vajra, noting that when in the 1st century BCE the iconography of Indra took form, the memory of Vedic weapons had since vanished. Thus the vajra of Hindu art corresponds to the keraunos (thunderbolt) of the Greek deity Zeus, and "[t]he iconography may have been transported via coins and small objects of art."

== See also ==
- Kallur archaeological site
- Pottery in the Indian subcontinent

== Sources ==
- Falk, H. (1993), "Copper Hoard Weapons and the Vedic vajra", South Asian Archaeology 1993, Proceedings of the 12th International Conference of South Asian Archaeologists in Helsinki
- Lal, B.B. (1951), "Further Copper Hoards from the Gangetic Basin and a Review of the Problem", Ancient India, 7, 1951, 20-39
- Mallory, J. P.; Adams, Douglas Q. (1997). Encyclopedia of Indo-European Culture. Taylor & Francis. ISBN 9781884964985.
- Parpola, Asko (2020). "Royal "Chariot" Burials of Sanauli near Delhi and Archaeological Correlates of Prehistoric Indo-Iranian Languages". Studia Orientalia Electronica. 8: 176. doi:10.23993/store.98032.
- Yule, Paul Alan (1985), The Bronze Age Metalwork of India, Prähistorische Bronzefunde XX,8, C.H.Beck, ISBN 3-406-30440-0, archived from the original on 2021-04-10
- Yule, Paul Alan (2002), "Addenda to "The Copper Hoards of the Indian Subcontinent: Preliminaries for an Interpretation", Man in Environment, 26 (2): 117–120, doi:10.11588/xarep.00000510
- Yule, Paul Alan (2003), "Beyond the Pale of Near Eastern Archaeology: Anthropomorphic Figures from al-Aqir near Baḥlāʾ, Sultanate of Oman, Man and Mining", in Stöllner, T. (ed.), Mensch und Bergbau Studies in Honour of Gerd Weisgerber on Occasion of his 65th Birthday, Bochum, pp. 537–542, doi:10.11588/propylaeumdok.00000109
- Yule, Paul Alan (2004), "Beyond the Pale of Near Eastern Archaeology: Anthropomorphic Figures from al-Aqir near Baḥlāʾ, Sultanate of Oman, Man and Mining", Pragdhara, 14, 2004, 231–239
- Yule, Paul Alan (2014), "A New Prehistoric Anthropomorphic Figure from the Sharqiyah, Oman", in Lamberg-Karlovsky‒B., C.; Cerasetti, Genito‒B. (eds.), 'My Life is like the Summer Rose' Maurizio Tosi e l'Archeologia come modo de vivere, Papers in Honour of Maurizio Tosi on his 70th Birthday. BAR Intern. Series 2690, Oxford, pp. 759–60, ISBN 978-1-4073-1326-9
- Zin, Monika (2005), "Vajrapāṇi in the Narrative Reliefs", in Fröhlich, C. (ed.), Migration, Trade and Peoples, Part 2: Gandharan Art, The British Association for South Asian Studies, (Proceedings of the 18th International Conference of the European Association of South Asian Archaeologists in London 2005) 73-83, ISBN 978-0-9553924-5-0
