= Robert von Heine-Geldern =

Austrian anthropologist and ancient historian (1885–1968)

Robert Freiherr von Heine-Geldern (16 July 1885 - 25 May 1968), known after 1919 as Robert Heine-Geldern, was an Austrian anthropologist, ethnologist, archaeologist and prehistorian who studied in particular the cultures and civilisations of Southeast Asia. He taught as a professor of ethnology and archaeology of India and Southeast Asia at the University of Vienna and, during his emigration from 1938 to 1949, in the United States. Heine-Geldern is considered a pioneer in the field of Southeast Asian Studies.

== Biography ==
Heine-Geldern was a grandson of the journalist and author Gustav Heine von Geldern who had been elevated to the hereditary rank of Freiherr (baron) by the Austrian emperor (all noble ranks and titles were abolished in Austria in 1919). The German poet Heinrich Heine was his great-uncle. Robert von Heine Geldern was born in Grub (Wienerwald) and attended school in Vienna which was then the capital of the Austro-Hungarian Empire. After his Matura diploma in 1903, he studied philosophy and art history first at the Ludwig-Maximilians-Universität München, then transferred to the University of Vienna. In 1910, he traveled to the India–Burma border region to study local cultures. Upon his return to Vienna, he switched to ethnology (under Father Wilhelm Schmidt), anthropology and prehistory, completing his doctoral thesis in 1914 on The Mountain Tribes of Northern and Northeastern Burma.

Heine-Geldern performed military service during World War I, then worked at the ethnographic department of the Natural History Museum in Vienna (which later became the Museum of Ethnology) from 1917 to 1927. His research combined ethnological, pre-historical and archaeological concepts, and in 1923 pioneered the field of Southeast Asian anthropology with his chapter "Sϋdostasien" in G. Buschan's Illustrierte Völkerkunde. In 1925 he completed his habilitation thesis and was awarded the venia legendi (licence to teach at universities) in the field of "ethnology with special consideration of Southeast Asia and India". He began teaching at the University of Vienna in 1927, where he was appointed associate professor for Ethnology and Archaeology of India, Southeast Asia and Oceania in 1931.

After the annexation of Austria to Nazi Germany in March 1938, his licence to teach was revoked for antisemitic motives. Therefore, he did not return from a lecture tour to the United States on which he had embarked two months earlier. Through World War II, he lived as a refugee in New York City, where he worked at the anthropological department of the American Museum of Natural History and lectured at New York University and Columbia University. Heine-Geldern was active in anti-fascist Austrian emigrants' organisations, creating the Austrian-American League together with Irene Harand in 1939 and later joining the Free Austrian Movement. Together with Margaret Mead, Ralph Linton, Adriaan J. Barnouw and Claire Holt he founded the East Indies Institute of America in 1941 which later became the Southeast Asia Institute. In 1943 Heine-Geldern was appointed professor at the Asia Institute in New York.

He returned to Vienna in 1949 where he was reinstated as associate professor of Asian prehistory, art history and ethnology a year later. Heine-Geldern was instrumental in rebuilding the University of Vienna's Institute of Ethnology, but was only awarded a full professorship in 1955, three years before his retirement. As Emeritus he continued to work at the institute until his death in Vienna in 1968.

Heine-Geldern was active in starting Southeast Asian studies as an academic field, and his essay on "Conceptions of State and Kingship in Southeast Asia," (1942) is now classic. He was awarded a medal by the Viking Fund, and was a member of the Austrian Academy of Sciences, Royal Asiatic Society, Royal Anthropological Institute, and the École française d'Extrême-Orient.

== Selected works ==
- "Gibt es eine austroasiatische Rasse?", Archiv für Anthropologie (XLVI), 1921, pp. 79–99.
- "Südostasien," in G. Buschan (ed.), Illustrierte Völkerkunde, (Stuttgart: Strecker und Schröder, 1923), II, i, pp. 689–968.
- Altjavanische Bronzen aus dem Besitz der Ethnographischen Sammlung des Naturhistorischen Museums in Wien, (Wien: C. W.Stern,1925), Artis Thesaurus I.
- "Eine Szene aus dem Sutasoma - Jataka auf hinterindischen und indonesischen Schwertgriffen," IPEK, Jahrbuch für Prahistorische und Ethnographische Kunst (1), 1925, pp. 198–238.
- "Die Steinzeit Südostasiens," Mitteilungen der Anthropologischen Gesellschaft in Wien (LVII), 1927, pp. 47–54.
- "Ein Beitrag zur Chronologic des Neolithikums in Südostasien," in W. Koppers (ed.), Publication d'Hommage Offerte au P. W. Schmidt (Wien: Mechithaπsten-Congregations-Buchdruckerei, 1928), pp. 809–843.
- "Die Megalithen Südostasiens und ihre Bedeutung für die Klärung der Megalithenfrage in Europa und Polynesien," Anthropos (XXIII), 1928, pp. 276–315.
- "Weltbild und Bauform in Südostasien," Wiener Beiträge zur Kunst und Kultur Asiens (IV), 1928-1929, pp. 28–78.
- "Urheimat und früheste Wanderungen der Austronesier," Anthropos (XXVII), 1932, pp. 543–619.
- "Vorgeschichtliche Grundlagen der kolonialindischen Kunst," Wiener Beiträge zur Kunst- und Kulturgeschichte (VIII), 1934, pp. 5–4θ.
- "The Archeology and Art of Sumatra," in E. M. Loeb (ed.), Sumatra: Its History and People (Vienna: University of Vienna, 1935), pp. 305–331.
- "L'art prébouddhique de la Chine et de l'Asie du Sud-Est et son influence en Océanie," Revue des Arts Asiatiques (XI), 1937, pp. 177–206.
- "Conceptions of State and Kingship in Southeast Asia," Far Eastern Quarterly (II), 1942, pp. 15–30. Revised version: Ithaca: Southeast Asia Program Data Paper #18, Cornell University, 1956.
- A Survey of Studies on Southeast Asia at American Universities and Colleges (New York: East Indies Institute of America, 1943).
- "Prehistoric Research in the Netherlands Indies," in P. Honig and F. Verdoorn (eds.), Science and Scientists in the Netherlands Indies (New York: Board for the Netherlands Indies, Surinam and Curaçao, 1945). Reprint: (New York: Southeast Asia Institute, 1945), pp. 129–167.
- "Research on Southeast Asia: Problems and Suggestions," American Anthropologist (XLVIII), 1946, pp. 149–174.
- "The Drum named Makalamau," in India Antigua. A Volume of Oriental Studies Presented to J. P. Vogel (Leyden: E. J. Brill, 1947), pp. 167–179.
- "Indonesian Art," United Asia (I), 1949, pp. 402–411.
- Significant parallels in the symbolic arts of Southern Asia and Middle America, 1951.
- "Bronzegeräte auf Flores," Anthropos (XLIX), 1954, pp. 683–685.
- "Herkunft und Ausbreitung der Hochkulturen," Almanach der Österreichischen Akademie der Wissenschaften, 1955, p. 105.
- "The Coming of the Aryans and the End of the Harappa Civilization," Man, Vol 56, pp136–140, October 1956.
- "Zwei alte Weltanschauungen und ihre kulturgeschichΐliche Bedeutung," Anzeiger der phil.- hist. Klasse der Österreichischen Akademie der Wissenschaften (No. 17), 1957, pp. 251–262.
- "Steinurnen- und Tonurnenbestattung in Südostasien," Der Schlern (No. 32), 1958, pp. 135–138.

== See also ==
- Heine
