= Gustav Heine von Geldern =

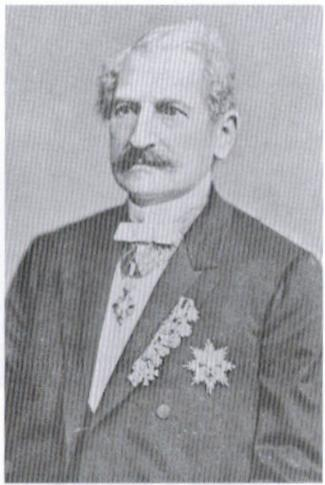
Gustav Heine von Geldern.

Gustav Heine, after 1870 Gustav Freiherr Heine von Geldern also Gustav von Heine-Geldern (18 June 1812, in Düsseldorf – 15 November 1886, in Vienna), was a German-Austrian journalist and press publisher.

He was born into a Jewish family in Düsseldorf; one of his brothers was Heinrich Heine. On completing his preliminary education at Hamburg he studied at the universities of Halle and Göttingen. He first engaged in agriculture, then in business, and then entered the Austrian army, rising to the rank of first lieutenant. In 1847 he founded in Vienna Das Fremdenblatt, a periodical that became the official organ of the Austrian Foreign Office. In 1867 he was made a member of the Order of the Iron Crown 3rd class and, as provided by the statutes of this order, made a hereditary knight within the Austrian Nobility. In 1870 he was elevated to the rank of Freiherr, with the cognomen Geldern, his mother's family name. He was also decorated with the Order of Franz Joseph of the second class.

== Marriage and family ==
He was married to Emilie Kaan von Albest (1824–1859) with whom he had five children. After his wife's death he was briefly engaged to Countess Bertha Kinsky von Wchinitz und Tettau, who later became first woman to be awarded the Nobel Peace Prize, but she broke off an engagement before the marriage occurred.

One of his sons, Maximilian (Max) Freiherr von Heine-Geldern (1849–1929), wrote under the name "Heldern", and was the author of the libretto to the operetta Mirolan. Through his daughter Maria von Heine-Geldern (1848–1911) he was maternal grandfather of Count Gustav Heinrich Maria Sizzo de Noris.
