= Jorwe =

Village in Maharashtra

Coordinates: 19.54388°N 74.27621°E

Jorwe (also spelled Jorve) is a village and an archaeological site located on the Pravara, a tributary of the Godavari River in Sangamner taluka of Ahmednagar district of Maharashtra state in India. This site was excavated in 1950-51 under the direction of Hasmukh Dhirajlal Sankalia and Shantaram Bhalchandra Deo.

== Archaeology ==
In the middle of the second millennium (c. 1500 BCE), the Jorwe culture, a Deccan Chalcolithic culture, derived from the name of this site in Ahmednagar district where it was first discovered, flourished in the whole of Maharashtra, except the districts in Konkan and certain parts of Vidarbha. As in the preceding culture, it was characterised by a distinct type of painted pottery, a blade-flake industry of chalcedony, as well as tools and ornaments of copper. Their mixed economy was based on agriculture, stock-raising, hunting and fishing. They cultivated a variety of crops, including cereals. They practised crop rotation - clear evidence of that has been unearthed at Inamgaon, near Pune.

The people of Jorwe lived in large rectangular houses with wattle and daub walls and thatched roofs. They stored grain in bins and pit silos and cooked food in two armed chulas (hearths). They interred the dead inside the house under the floor. Children were buried in two urns that were joined mouth-to-mouth, while adults were placed in a supine position with the head towards the North.

Multiple houses that have been found at the Jorwe have been larger, rectangle shaped houses with some even featuring a courtyard. The pottery was made of clay, and painted with a maximum of two colors, including black paint. Some pottery had a spout. The pottery shows trade with Navdatoli, Ghargaon, and another site near Sangamner. Other artifacts found in the Jorwe sites include bangles with intricate designs.

== Notable residents ==
Jorve has historical background in Indian independence movement. Bhausaheb Thorat, known freedom fighter and milestone of Late Bhausaheb Thorat Sahakari Sakhar Karkhana Ltd, Sangamner was from here. Balasaheb Thorat, minister in the Maharashtra state lives in Jorve.

== See also ==
- History of Maharashtra
- Daimabad
- Inamgaon
