= History of Madhya Pradesh =

History of the Indian state

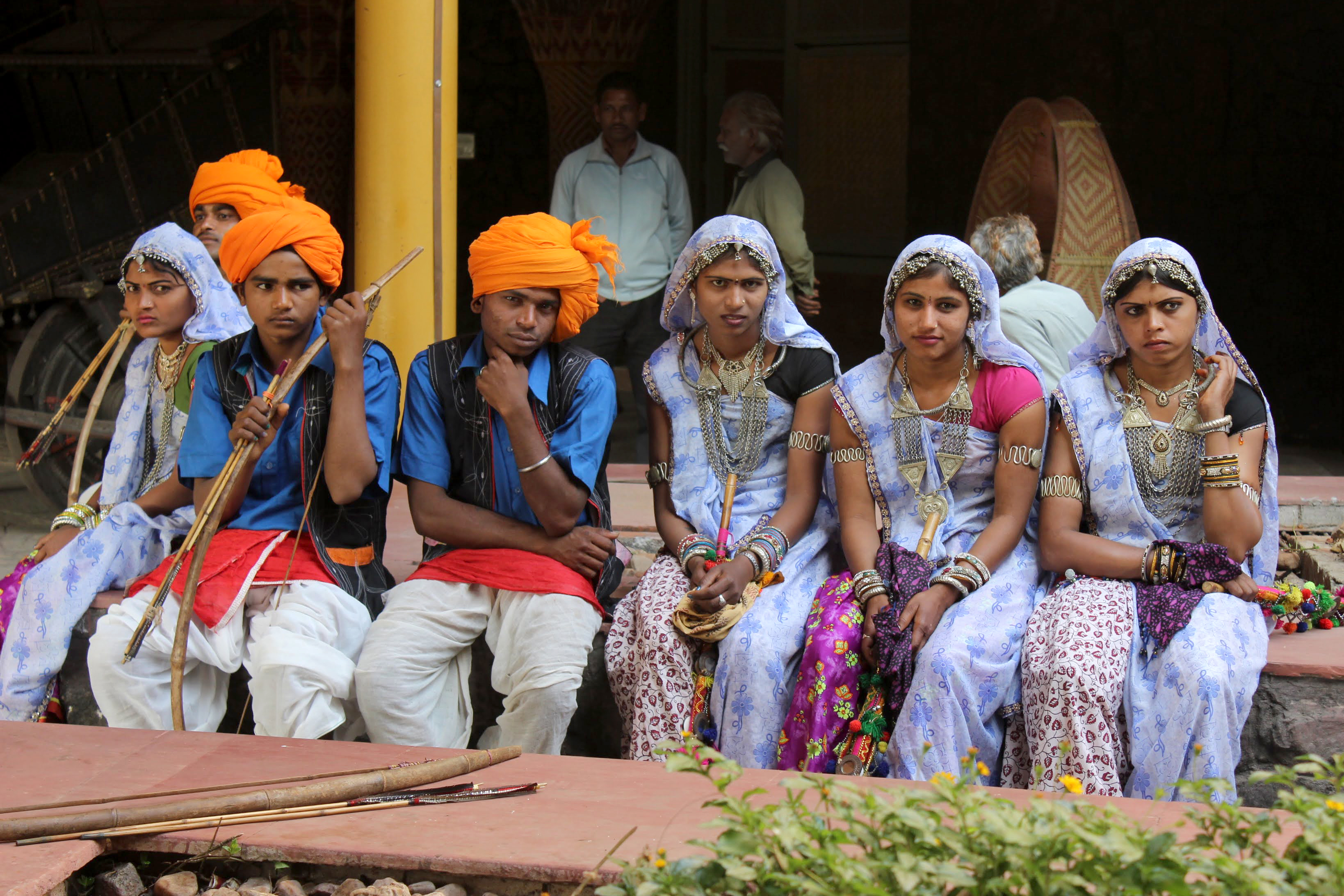
Tribes of Madhya Pradesh

The history of Madhya Pradesh can be divided into three periods - the ancient period, the medieval period and modern period.

During the ancient period, the region was dominated by the Nanda Empire, the Maurya Empire, and the Gupta Empire.

The medieval period saw the rise of Rajput clans including the Paramara and Chandela Tomar clans, the latter is known for constructing the temples of Khajuraho. By the 14th century, the Malwa Sultanate ruled the region.

The modern period in Madhya Pradesh saw the rise of the Mughal Empire, Maratha Empire, and the British Empire. The princely states of Gwalior, Indore, and Bhopal, became a part of modern Madhya Pradesh. India gained independence in 1947 from the British, and British influences ceased then. The state of Madhya Pradesh was formed in 1956, and Chhattisgarh was carved out from the state in 2000.

== Ancient history ==
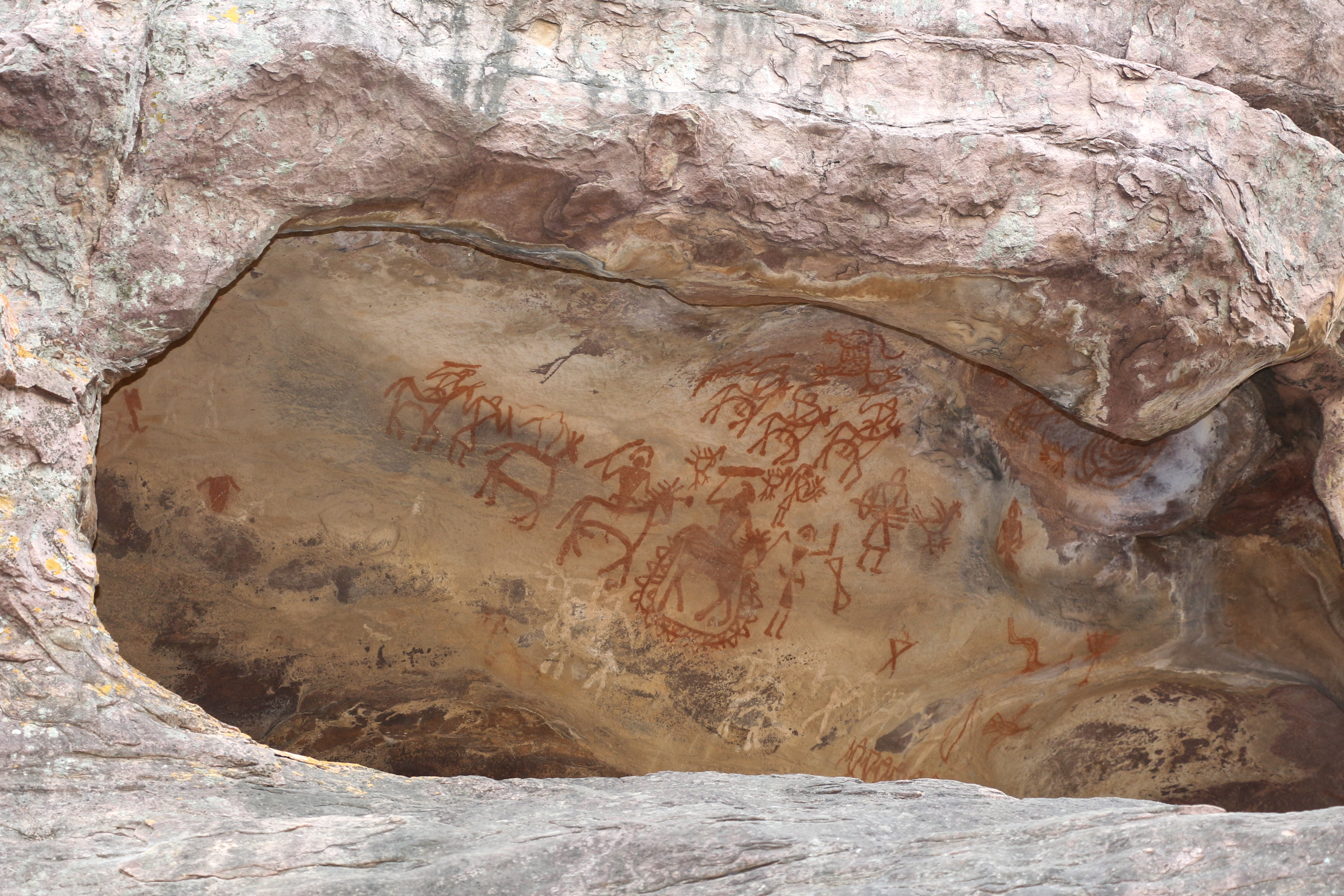
The rock shelters of Bhimbetka exhibit the earliest traces of human life on the Indian subcontinent.

The Bhimbetka caves show evidence of Paleolithic settlements in present-day Madhya Pradesh. Stone Age tools have also been discovered at various places along the Narmada river valley. Rock shelters with cave paintings, the earliest of which can be dated to 30,000 BCE, have also been discovered at a number of places. The settlements of humans in present-day Madhya Pradesh developed primarily in the valleys of rivers such as Narmada, Chambal, and Betwa. Chalcolithic sites of the Malwa culture have been discovered at a number of places including Eran, Kayatha, Maheshwar, Nagda, and Navdatoli.

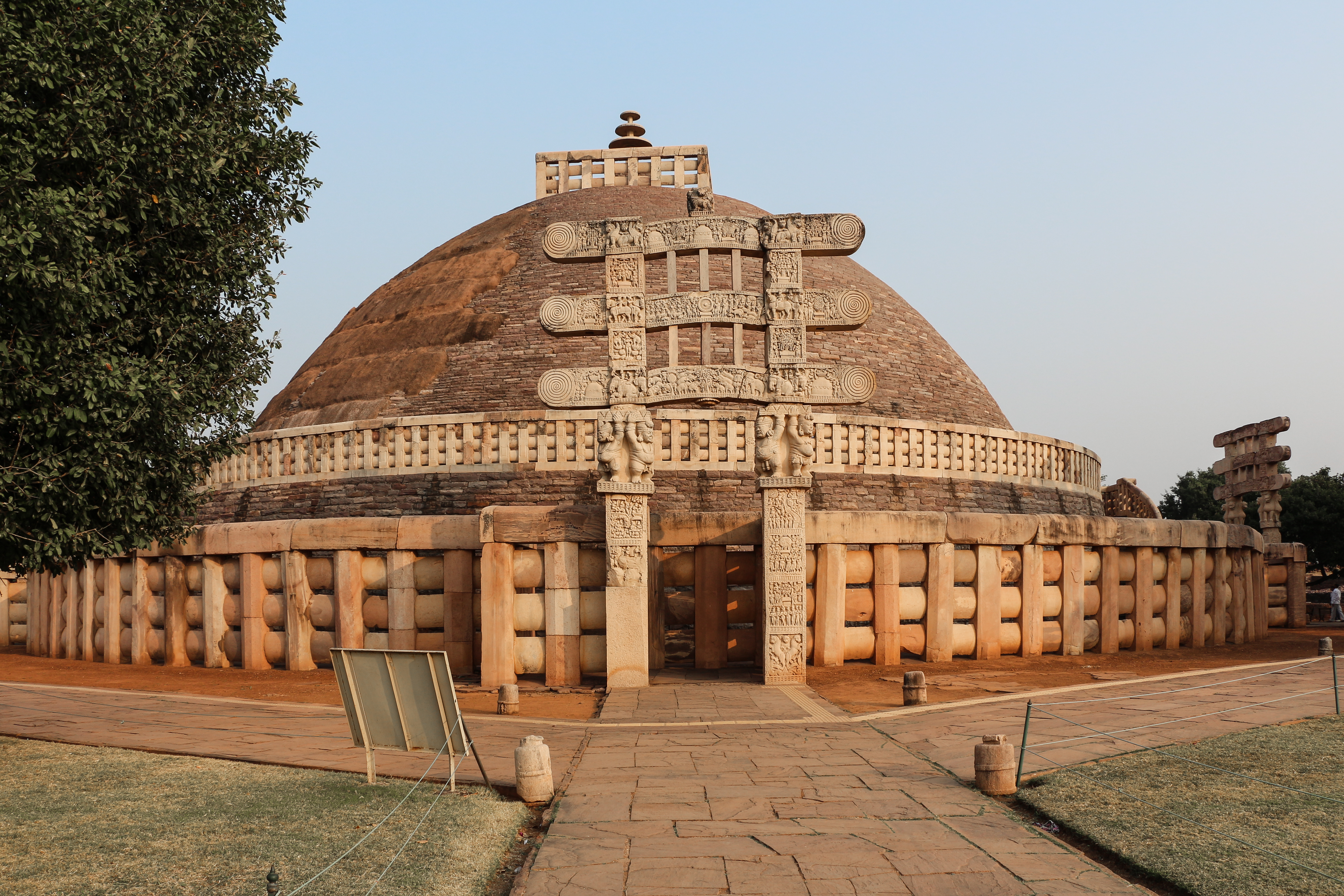
The Sanchi Stupa at Sanchi, Madhya Pradesh built by emperor Ashoka in the third century BCE.

During the early Vedic period, the Vindhya mountains formed the southern boundary of the Indo-Aryan territory. Rigveda, the earliest extant Sanskrit text, does not mention the Narmada River. The 4th century BCE grammarian Pāṇini mentions the Avanti janapada in central India. It mentions only one territory lying to the south of Narmada: the Ashmaka. The Buddhist text Anguttara Nikaya names the sixteen mahajanapadas, of which Avanti, Chedi and Vatsa occupied parts of Madhya Pradesh. The Mahavastu mentions another kingdom called Dasharna in the eastern Malwa region. The Pali language Buddhist works mention several important cities in central India, including Ujjeni (Ujjayani), Vedisa (Vidisha) and Mahissati (Mahishmati).

According to ancient texts, Avanti was ruled successively by the Haihaya dynasty, the Vitihotra dynasty (a branch of the Haihayas) and the Pradyota dynasty. Under the Pradyotas, Avanti became a major power of the Indian subcontinent. It was later annexed by Shishunaga into the Magadha empire. The Shishunaga dynasty was overthrown by the Nandas, who were replaced by the Mauryans.

== Mauryans and their successors ==
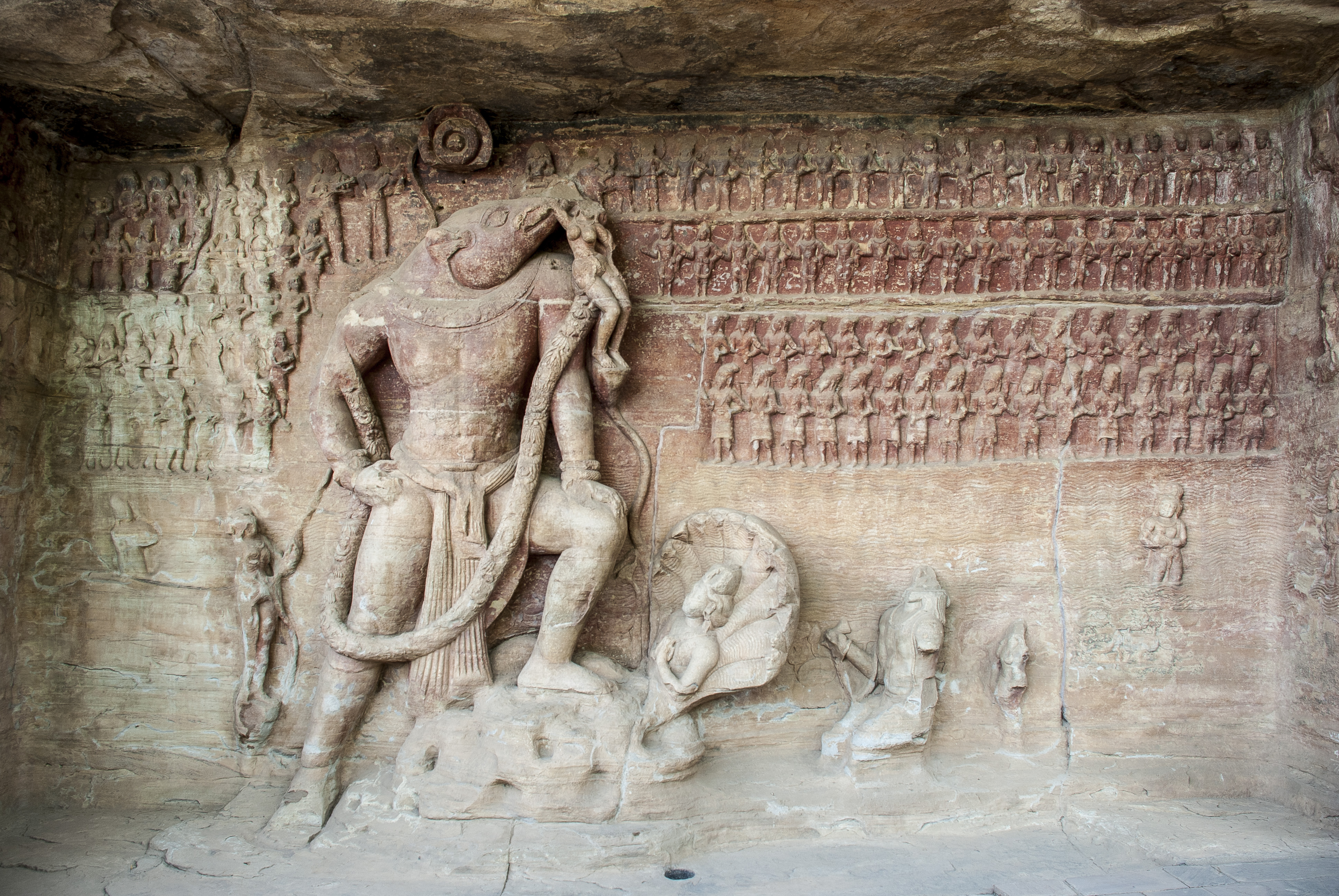
The Udayagiri Caves date back to the fifth century CE.

Pataini temple is a Jain temple built during the Gupta period, 5th century

The city of Ujjain arose as a major center in the second wave of Indian urbanization in the sixth century BC, and served as the chief city of the kingdom of Malwa or Avanti. Further east, the kingdom of Chedi lie in Bundelkhand. Chandragupta Maurya united northern India c. 326-27 BCE, establishing the Maurya Empire (327 to 185 BCE), which included all of modern-day Madhya Pradesh. King Ashoka's wife was said to come from Vidisha- a town north of today's Bhopal. The Maurya Empire went into decline after the death of Ashoka, and Central India was contested among the Sakas, Kushanas, and local dynasties during the 3rd to 1st centuries BCE. Ujjain emerged as the predominant commercial center of western India from the first century BCE, located on the trade routes between the Ganges plain and India's Arabian Sea ports. It was also an important Hindu and Buddhist center. The Satavahana dynasty of the northern Deccan and the Saka dynasty of the Western Satraps fought for the control of Madhya Pradesh during the 1st to 3rd centuries CE.

The south Indian king Gautamiputra Satakarni of the Satavahana dynasty inflicted a crushing defeat upon the saka rulers and conquered parts of Malwa and Gujarat in the 2nd century CE.

Northern India was conquered by the Gupta Empire in the 4th and 5th centuries, which was India's "classical age". The Parivrajaka and the Uchchhakalpa dynasties ruled as feudatories of the Guptas in Madhya Pradesh. The Vakataka dynasty were the southern neighbors of the Guptas, ruling the northern Deccan plateau from the Arabian Sea to the Bay of Bengal. These empires collapsed towards the end of the 5th century.

== Middle Kingdoms and Late Medieval period (c. 230 BCE – 1526 CE) ==
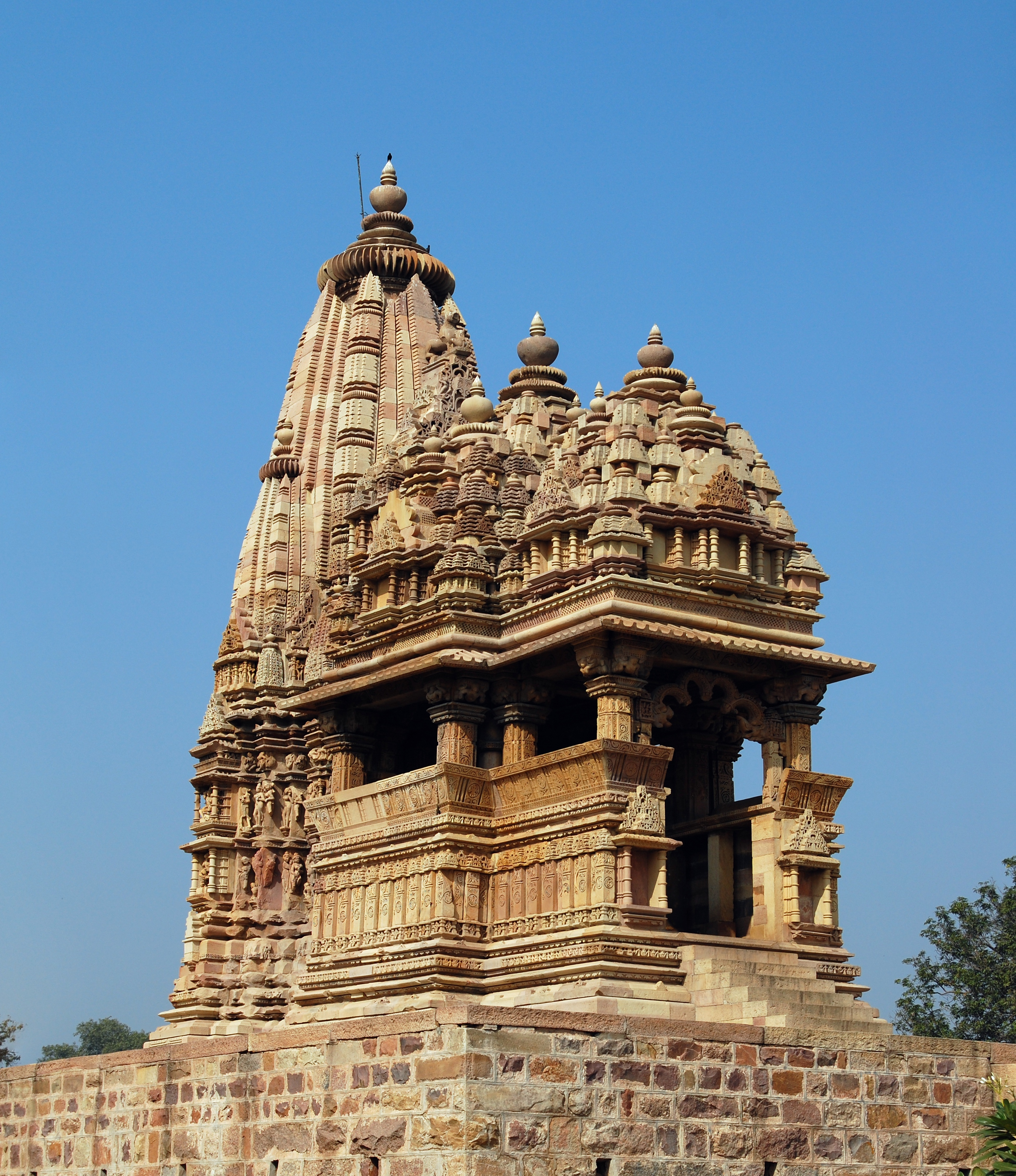
Javari Temple at Khajuraho. The temples at Khajuraho were built by the Chandela kingdom in the 10th and 11th centuries.

The attacks of the Hephthalites or White Huns brought about the collapse of the Gupta empire, and India broke up into smaller states. A king Yasodharman of Malwa defeated the Huns in 528, ending their expansion. King Harsha of Thanesar reunited northern India for a few decades before his death in 647. Malwa was ruled by the South Indian Rashtrakuta Dynasty from the late 8th century to the 10th century. The Medieval period saw the rise of the Rajput clans, including the Paramaras of Malwa and the Chandelas of Bundelkhand.

=== Rajput clans ===
==== Paramaras ====
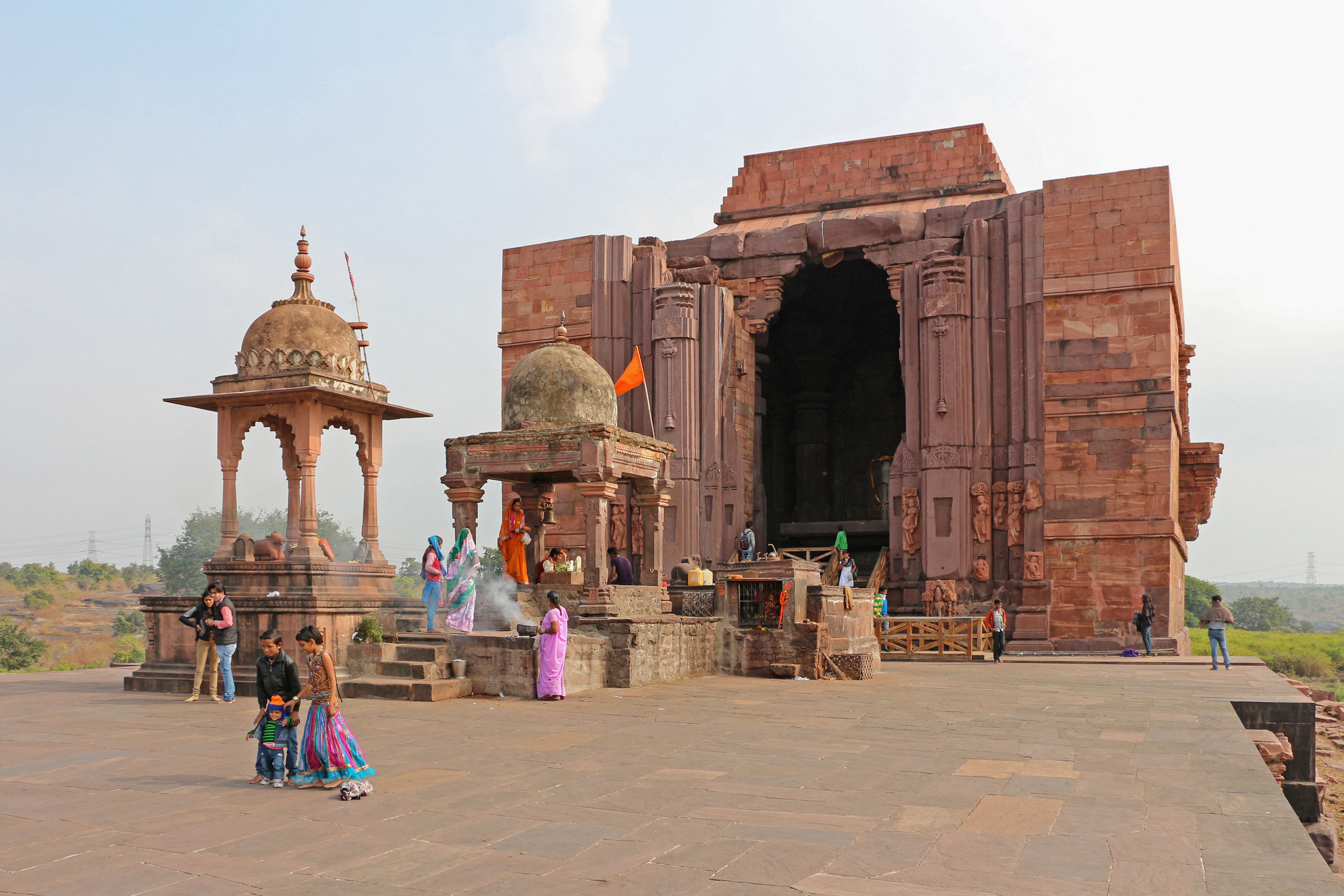
The Bhojeshwar Temple in Bhojpur built by the Raja Bhoj.

The Rajput Paramaras ruled between the 9th and 14th centuries CE. The Paramara king Bhoja (c. 1010–1060) was a brilliant polymath and prolific writer. He is famous for his patronage of the arts, and for commissioning inscriptions found all over the region. The last known Paramara king, was defeated and killed by the forces of Alauddin Khalji of Delhi in 1305 CE.

==== Chandelas ====
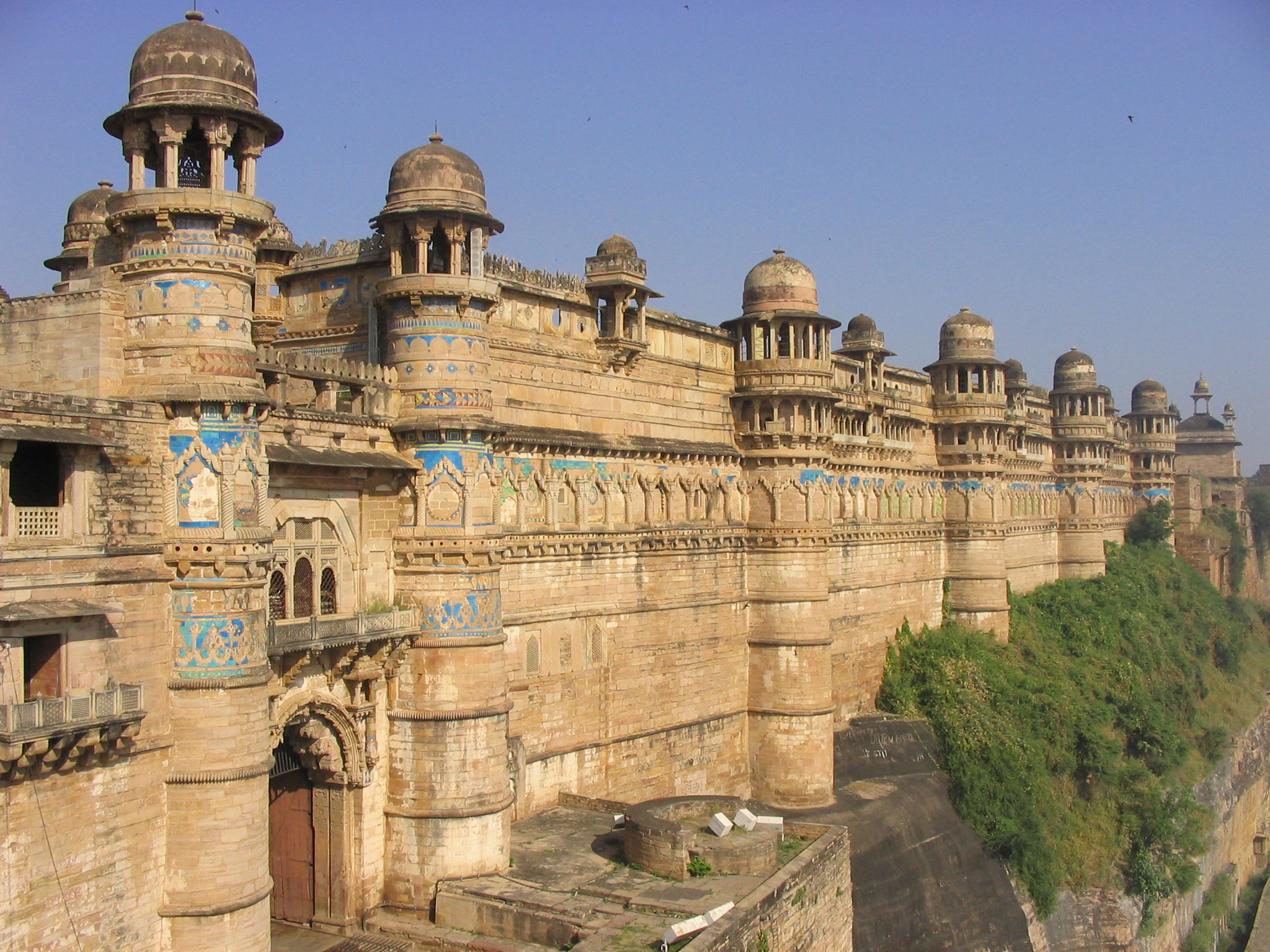
The Gwalior Fort at Gwalior was expanded by several dynasties during the medieval and early modern periods.

The Chandelas ruled between the 9th and the 13th centuries CE. They created the temple city of Khajuraho between c. 950 and c. 1050. The temple complex is famous for their erotic sculptures. The Khajuraho group of temples were built together but were dedicated to two religions, Hinduism and Jainism, suggesting a tradition of acceptance and respect for diverse religious views.

The Chandela power effectively ended around the beginning of the 13th century, following Chahamana and Ghurid invasions.

Northern Madhya Pradesh was conquered by the Turkic Delhi Sultanate in the 13th century. After the collapse of the Delhi Sultanate at the end of the 14th century, independent regional kingdoms reemerged, including the Tomara kingdom of Gwalior and the Sultanate of Malwa, with its capital at Mandu.

=== Malwa Sultanate ===
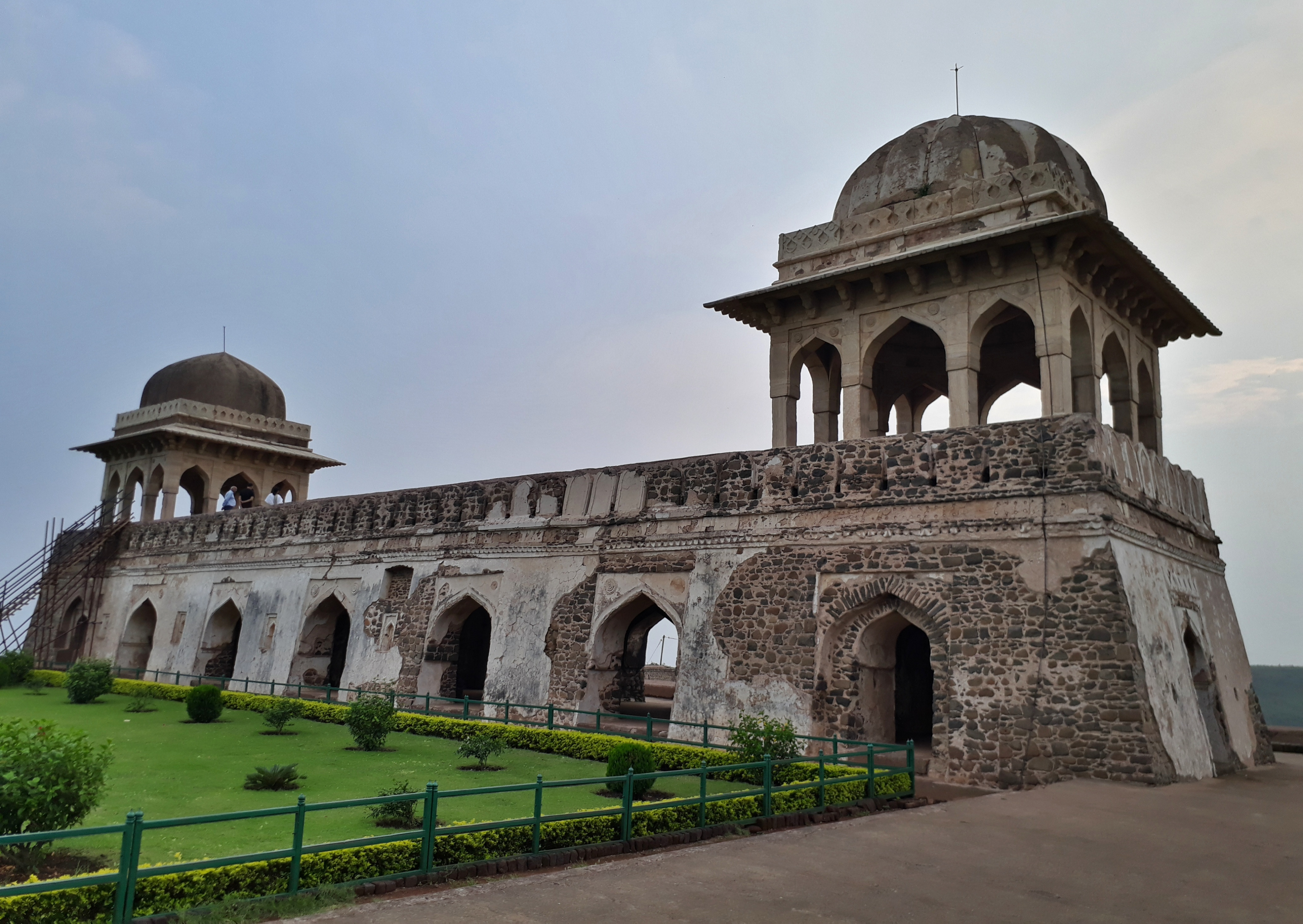
Rupmati Pavilion at Mandu, built during the 15th century CE.

The sultanate of Malwa was founded by Dilawar Khan Ghuri, the governor of Malwa for the Delhi Sultanate, who asserted his independence in 1392, but did not actually assume the ensigns of royalty till 1401. Initially Dhar was the capital of the new kingdom, but soon it was shifted to Mandu. The Malwa Sultanate was conquered by the Sultanate of Gujarat in 1531. Malwa painting originated during this period.

== Modern period ==
=== Mughal rule ===
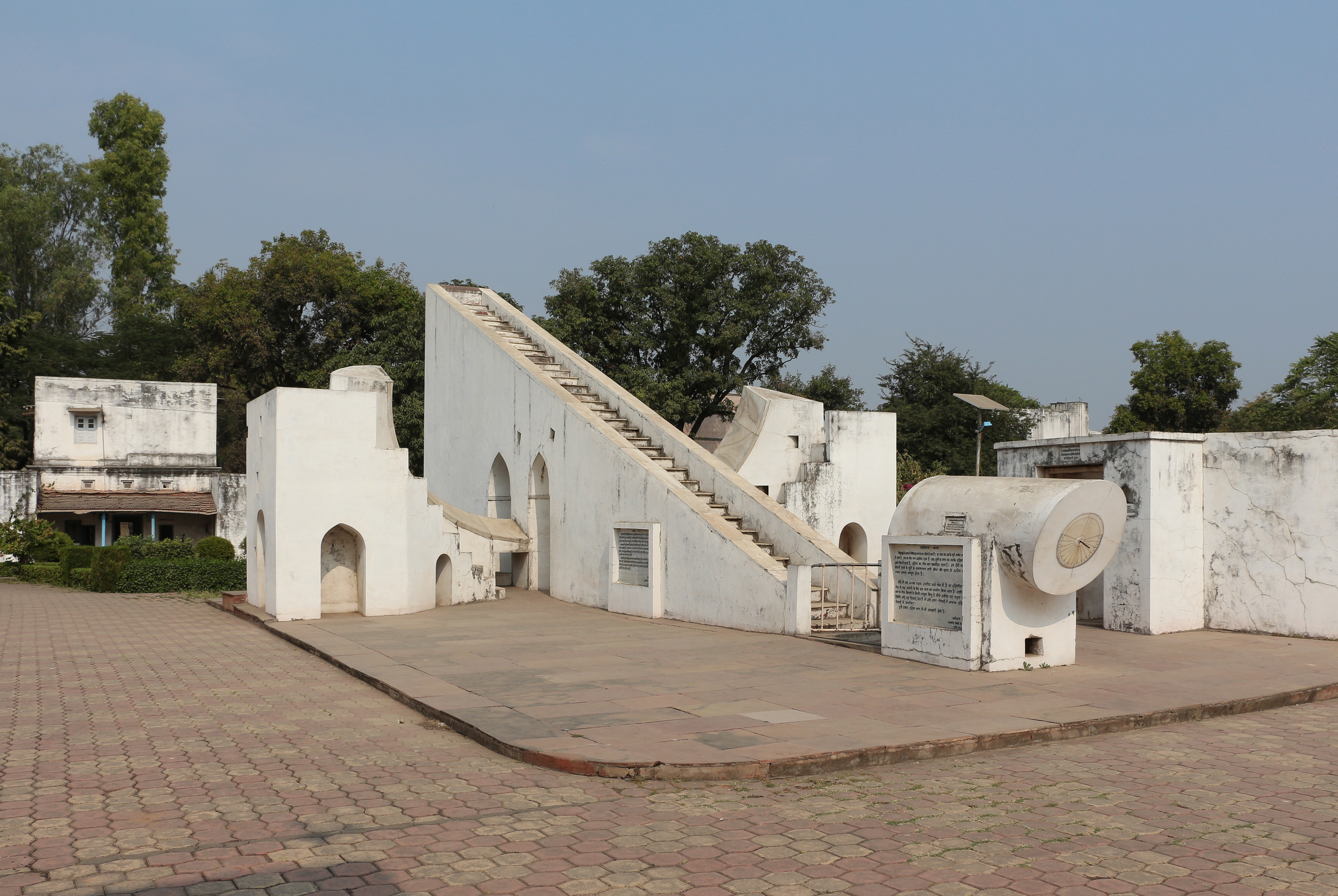
Jantar Mantar, an 18th-century observatory at Ujjain.

Most of Madhya Pradesh came under Mughal rule during the reign of the emperor Akbar (1556–1605). Gondwana and Mahakoshal remained under the control of Gond kings, who acknowledged Mughal supremacy but enjoyed virtual autonomy. During the Mughal period, Gwalior became a center for music, and the home of the famous Gwalior Gharana.

After the death of the Mughal emperor Aurangzeb in 1707, Mughal control began to weaken, and the Marathas began to expand from their base in central Maharashtra.

=== Maratha rule ===
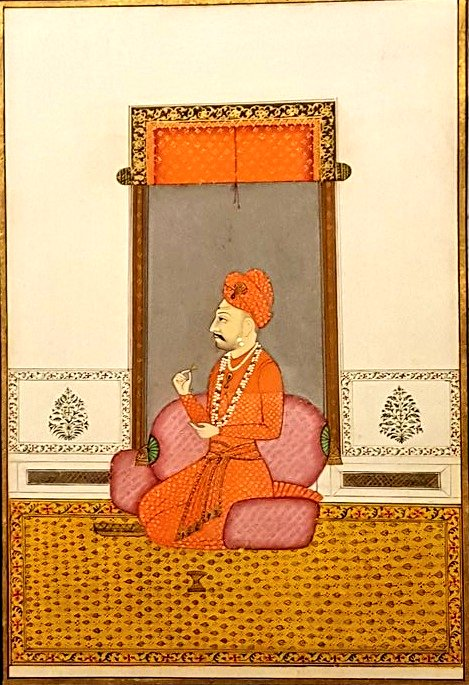
Peshwa Bajirao I led the majority of Maratha campaigns against the Mughals in Madhya Pradesh

In the 18th century, the Maratha Empire began to expand and gained large amounts of territory, especially under the leadership of Peshwa Bajirao I and Peshwa Balaji Bajirao. The Battle of Bhopal was fought in Bhopal in 1737, where the Marathas defeated the Mughal forces. Large tracts of land in Malwa were ceded to the Marathas.

The Shindes (Scindia) of Gwalior ruled most of Gird region, the Holkars of Indore ruled much of Malwa, and the Bhonsles of Nagpur dominated Mahakoshal and Gondwana as well as Vidarbha in Maharashtra. Jhansi was founded by a Maratha general. Bhopal was ruled by a Muslim dynasty descended from the Afghan General Dost Mohammed Khan, but they paid large amounts of tribute to the Marathas. After the Third Battle of Panipat in 1761, and especially after the death of Peshwa Madhavrao in 1772, Maratha expansion slowed down, yet the Marathas kept ruling all of present-day Madhya Pradesh until they were defeated by the British in 1818.

=== British influences ===
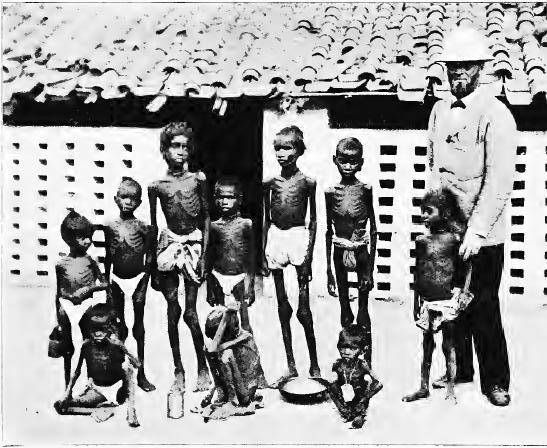
Famine-stricken children at Jubbalpore, c. 1898. There were numerous preventable famines during British rule in India, resulting in millions of deaths.

The British were expanding their Indian dominions from bases in Bengal, Bombay, and Madras, and the three Anglo-Maratha Wars were fought between 1775 and 1818. The Third Anglo-Maratha War left the British controlling large parts of India. Despite this, the Shinde dynasty of Gwalior and the Holkar dynasty of Indore ruled large parts of Madhya Pradesh until 1947. Yet both kingdoms signed treaties with the British allowing for tribute payments.

In 1853, the British annexed the state of Nagpur, which included southeastern Madhya Pradesh, eastern Maharashtra and most of Chhattisgarh, which were combined with the Saugor and Nerbudda Territories to form the Central Provinces in 1861. The princely states of northern Madhya Pradesh were governed by the Central India Agency.

British rule was marked by large scale poverty and numerous famines. The first railway lines were built during this period, but they were primarily used to ship raw materials to seaside ports.

== Post-Independence (1947 CE – present) ==
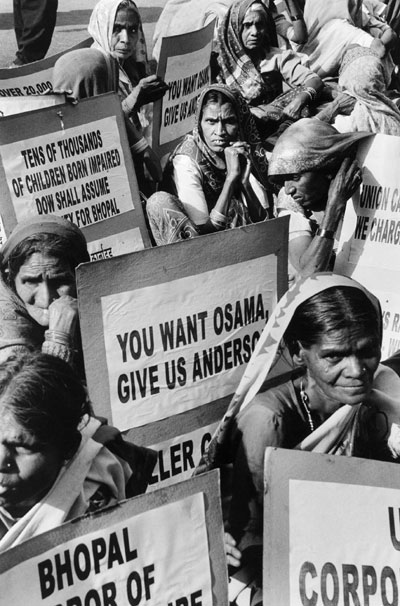
Victims of the 1984 Bhopal disaster march in September 2006, demanding the extradition of the American businessman Warren Anderson.

The new states of Madhya Bharat, Vindhya Pradesh, and Bhopal were formed out of the Central India Agency.

In 1956, according to the States Reorganization Act, the states of Madhya Bharat, Vindhya Pradesh, and Bhopal were merged into Madhya Pradesh, and the Marathi-speaking southern region Vidarbha, which included Nagpur, was ceded to Bombay State. Bhopal became the new capital of the state, and Ravishankar Shukla was elected as the first Chief Minister.

In December 1984, the Bhopal disaster killed more than 3,787 people and affected more than 500,000 people. A Union Carbide India Limited pesticide plant in Bhopal leaked around 32 tons of toxic gases, including methyl isocyanate (MIC) gas which led to the world's worst industrial disaster in history.

In November 2000, as part of the Madhya Pradesh Reorganization Act, the southeastern portion of the state split off to form the new state of Chhattisgarh.

== See also ==
- List of forts in Madhya Pradesh

== Bibliography ==
- Pranab Kumar Bhattacharyya (1977). Historical Geography of Madhya Pradesh from Early Records. Motilal Banarsidass. ISBN 978-0-8426-9091-1.
