= Ghodganga Sugar Factory =

Sugar factory in Pune, India

Ghodganga Sahakari Sakhar Karkhana
- Type: Cooperative
- Industry: Sugar factory
- Founded: 16 May 1990
- Founder: Raosahebdada Pawar
- Headquarters: Nhavare Parisar Shirur, Maharashtra
- Area served: Shirur, Maharashtra and Worldwide
- Key people: Ashok Pawar (chairman and CEO)
- Products: Sugar, Molases and Bagasse

Ghodganga Sahakari Sakhar Karkhana Ltd is an establishment set up around 70 km east to Pune. Factory is recently named after founder Raosahebdada Pawar Ghodganga Sahakari Sakhar Karkhana Ltd (RPGSSKL). This project turned out to be the best achievement of Cooperative sugar factories and rural development. This set up is being conducive as sugar production is prime business for region. The project brings employment and social development. Sugarcane grower/farmers in the region are really encouraged by the establishment. The project started with capital share of local farmers.

== History ==
Cooperative sugar factories and rural developments set up in Maharashtra state. The establishment was started with the capital shares of local farmers, Pune District Central Cooperative Bank and support by Raosahebdada Pawar on 16 May 1990 with a crushing capacity of 2500 TCD. Cooperative movement for sugar industry started in 1960s in Maharashtra with announcement of the potential 12 locations in the states where sugar factories could be established. The then-called Bombay state government announced a capital share of Indian Rupee 1 million, for the cooperatives societies to come forward and establish sugar factories at these potential locations. A central committee was formed by Bombay State Cooperative Bank under the chairmanship. The factory caters to the Shirur, Maharashtra sugarcane growers, as well as other states. This is prominently conducive to the local region.

== Harvesting ==
Harvesting of sugarcane is done with the help of machine and for this bank also provided the fund to farmers. Currently factory has owned four harvester machines. Taking into account scarcity of workers in future factory has taken this initiative.

== Sugarcane development programme ==
For increasing production of sugarcane factory provides guidance, field work training to the farmers. In last year factory appointed officials from research centre to do this work. This implementation is followed & monitored completely.

== Power unit ==
Raosahebdada Pawar Ghodganga Sahakari Sakhar Karkhana Ltd, which had set up a co-generation power unit at Shirur in Pune district of Maharashtra. The Bagasse based power unit with a capacity of 20 MW is expected to entail a cost of Rs 2 billion. The power project raised request to upgrade capacity to 20.5 MW. This Project is economically strong by converting its own waste in useful product and power generation. The pollution generated from this unit can be successfully managed through EMP implementation or be converted to useful irrigation water with nutrients and electricity. This project justifies as to curb electricity issue and wastage of cane trash and bagasse lead to environment risk.

== Breweries and distilleries ==
The Raosahebdada Pawar Ghodganga Sahakari Sakhar Karkhana Ltd to set up distilleries at their existing setup with INR 99.5 million, approximately US$15.5 million. The project involves setting up to 30 KLPD Molasses based distillery unit for production of 30 KLPD of rectified spirit of 27 KLPD of Extra Neutral Alcohol of 27.5 KLPD absolute Alcohol. The project have proposed to establish distillery unit within same premises adopting continuous fermentation process.

== Awards ==
Factory stands ahead in the queue from the first couple of years of its establishment.

The project achieved Best Cooperative sugar factory award on its fourth year.

The establishment set itself in first position for the Maharashtra Energy Development Agency award for the year 2012–13 in the Sugar Cooperative category.
