= Lota (vessel) =

Vessel used in South Asia

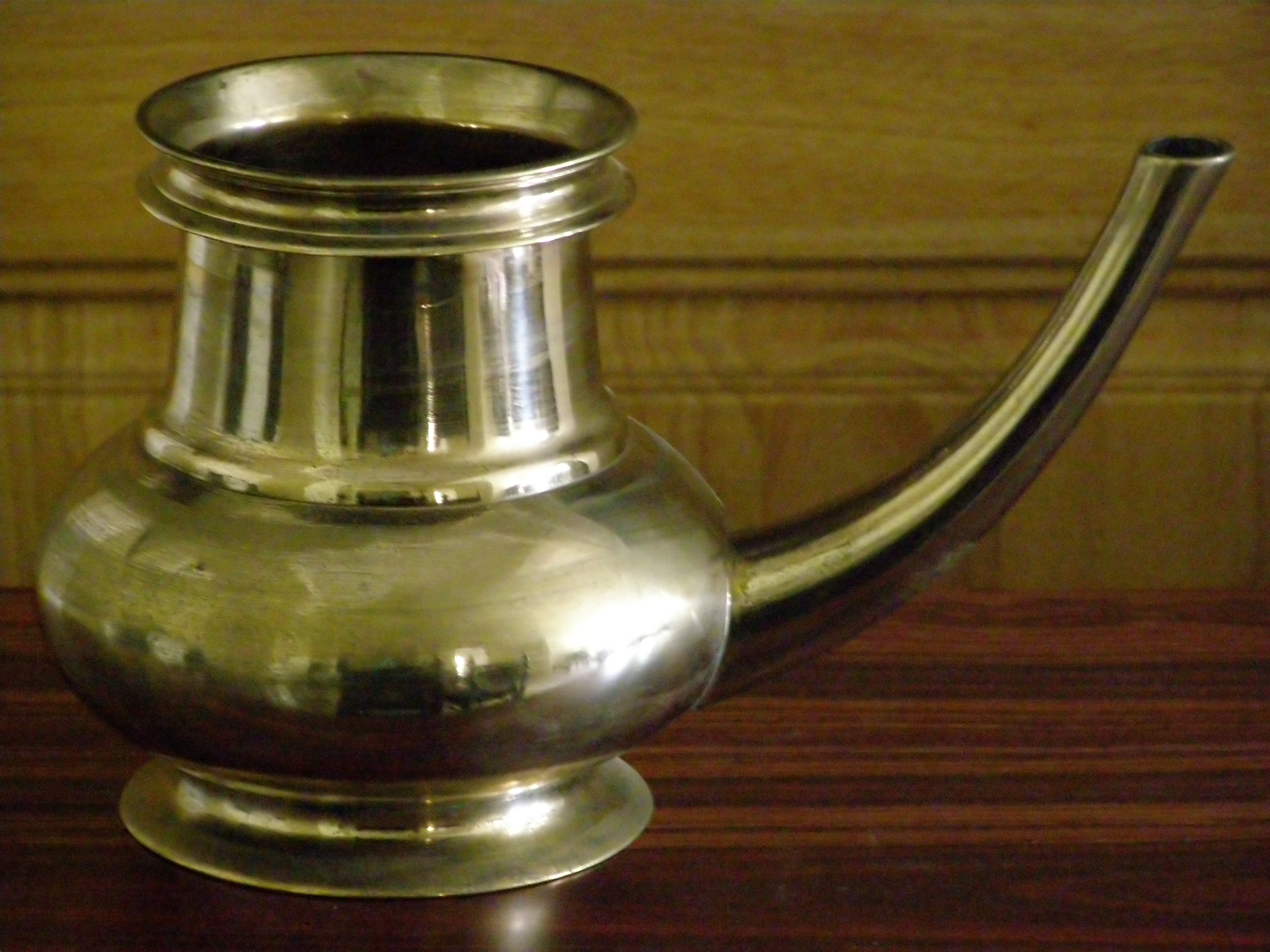
The kindi, a spouted copper vessel traditionally used in Kerala, India.

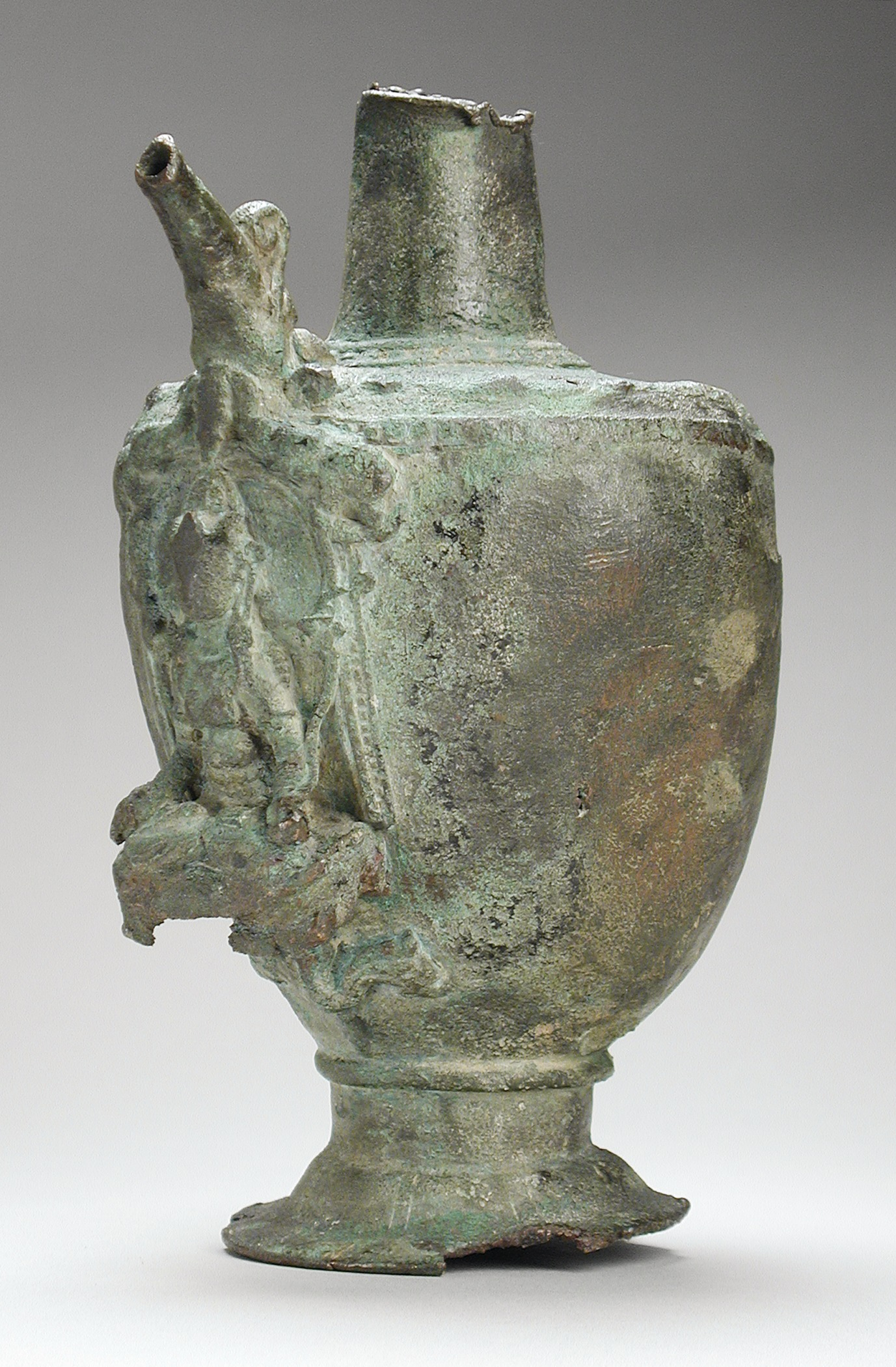
9th-century spouted vessel, India

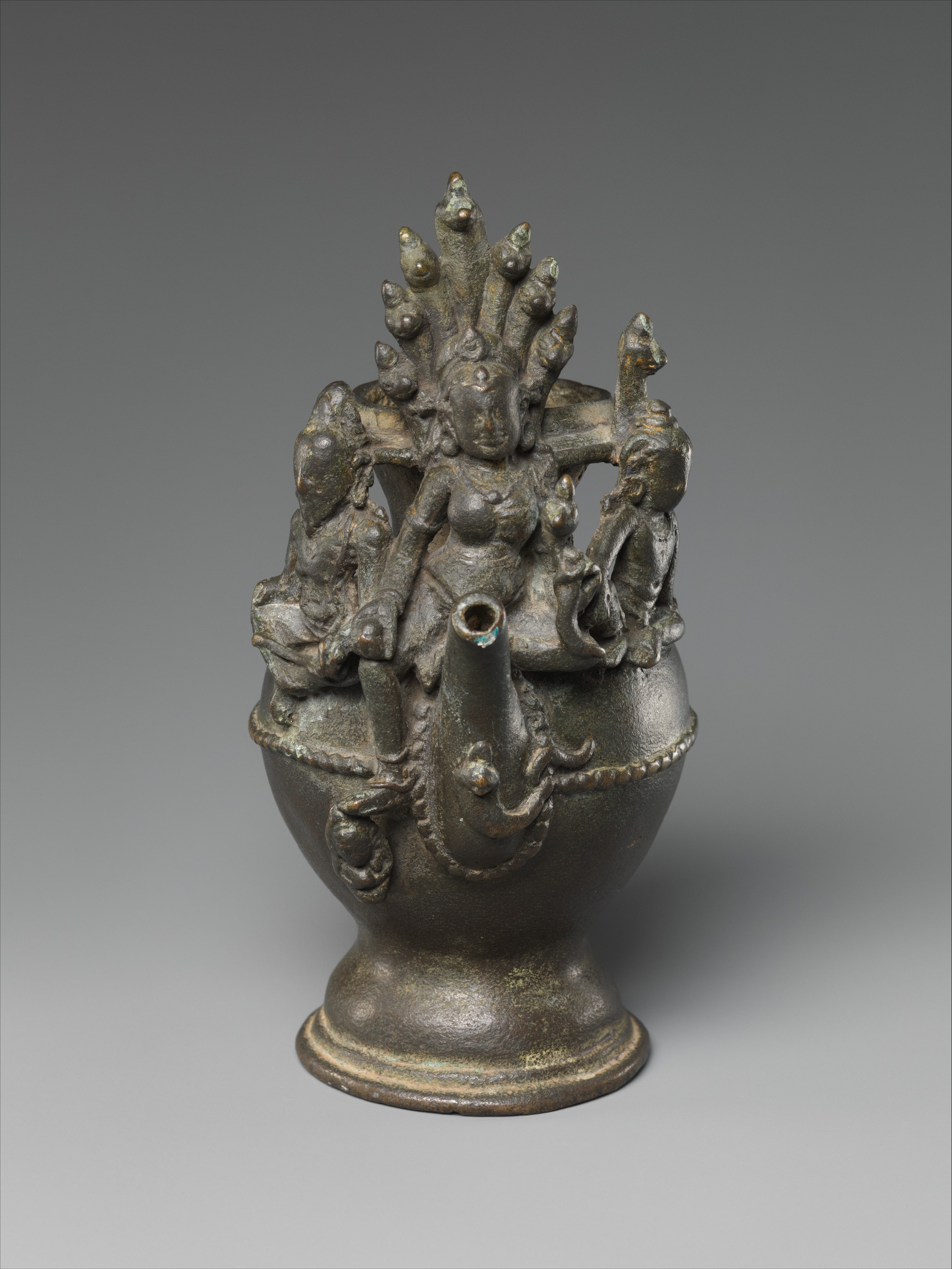
10th-century spouted vessel with deities, India

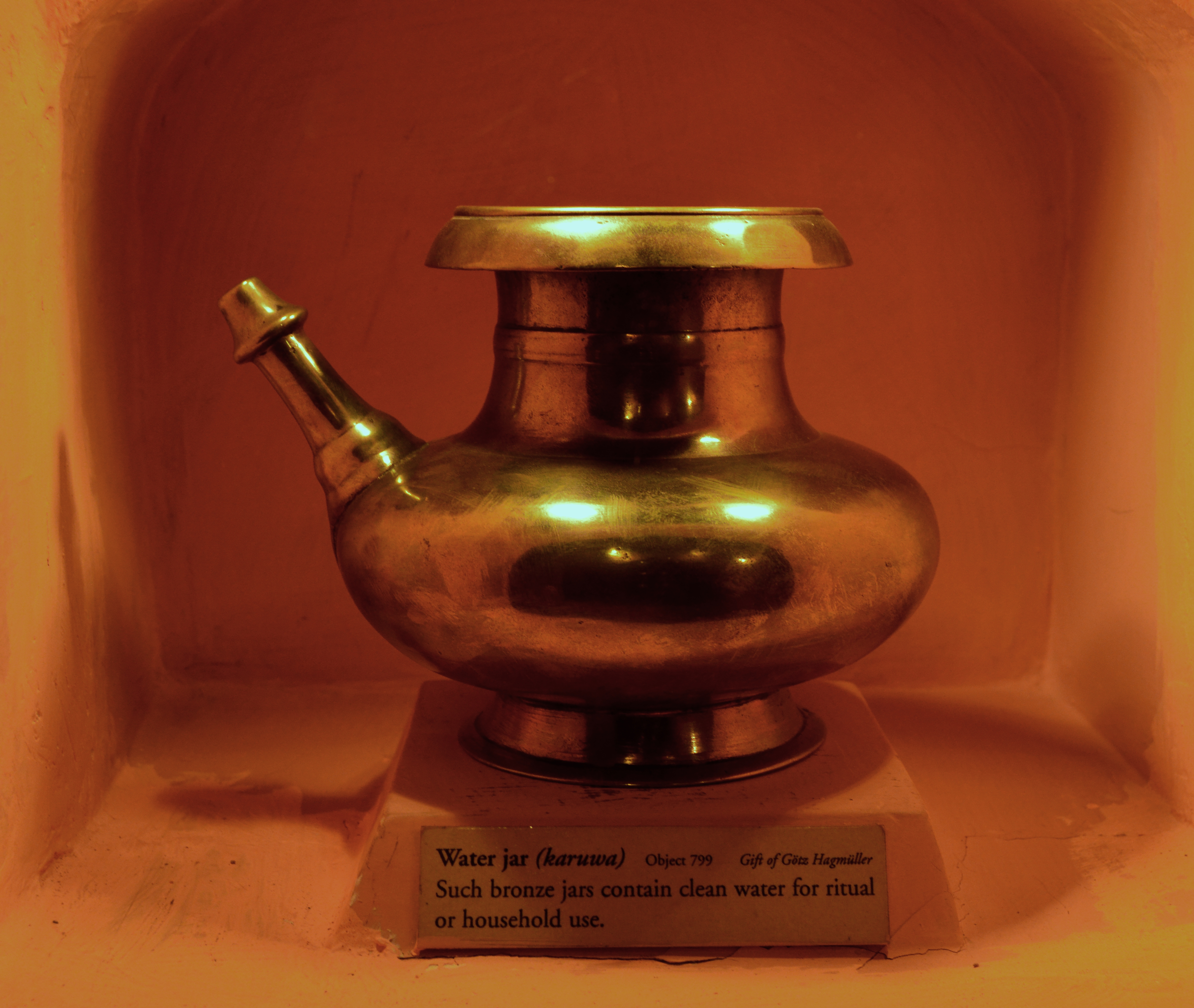
The karuwa, a lota-like spouted vessel commonly used for religious rituals and serving water and liquor in Nepal.

A lota (Bengali: লোটা; Hindi: लोटा; Urdu: لوٹا; Odia: ଲୋଟା/ନୋଟା) is a small, spouted, and rounded jug that has been used in India since the 2nd millennium BCE or earlier. Normally there is no handle. The design itself serves multiple purposes; a copper lota is commonly used in Indian religious ceremonies, such as yajna during puja, for wedding rituals, and other sacred traditions. It is also used for serving water and liquor. According to the ancient Indian/Hindu-origin traditional medicine system of ayurveda, drinking water stored in the copper lota has health and nutritional benefits.

The vessel's regional variations include the bodna (Bengali: বদনা) in Bengal (called garu or jhari in West Bengal (Bengali: গাড়ু/ঝারি)), the kindi in Kerala, and the Karuwa in Nepal.

In the Western World, where the supply of the lota is restricted, the South Asian diaspora has often used watering cans for the same purposes.

== History ==
The earliest known examples of lota and kindi in ancient India are from the Chalcolithic period, notably in the Savalda Culture and two well-preserved examples from the pottery of the Jorwe Culture, dating back to the 2nd millennium BCE. Highly decorative spouted vases with floral motifs are also known from Chandraketugarh, dating back to around the 2nd century BC to the 1st century CE. The earliest lotas were made of clay or teracotta while modern versions are notably metal.

== Design ==
=== Regional variations ===
In West Bengal and parts of Bangladesh, the term bôdnā (Bengali: বদনা) describes spouted (teapot-like) vessels, and the vessels used for puja are called ghôt or ghôti, while lotā is used for cleansing mugs. In Odisha, vessels without the spout is also known as lota, while spout vessels are known as Badu and Jeri, used for prayer rituals and serving liquor. They are also known as Karwa, Jharis and Achaman Jharis (utensils with spouts) in Hindi Belt and Gujarat in northern and western India, used for prayer rituals. It is also known as Mooku sombu and Pal Kindi used as milk feeder for babies in southern parts of India. In Nepal, it is known as Karuwa which is used for religious rituals, serving water and liquor.

=== Reception ===
American designers Charles and Ray Eames in their The India Report expressed a great admiration for the lota, saying about its design, "Of all the objects we have seen and admired during our visit to India, the Lota, that simple vessel of everyday use, stands out as perhaps the greatest, the most beautiful."

== Usage ==
=== Idioms and literature ===
In some parts of the Indian subcontinent, the use of the phrase "bependi ka lota" (a "lota without a base") is colloquially used to refer to a person who may switch their loyalties. This comes from the observation that a spherical lota without a base tends to roll over in unpredictable directions when kept on uneven ground. The neologism "lotacracy" was coined in Pakistan to describe politicians who switch parties for their convenience.

=== Ayurveda ===
According to the ancient Indian/Hindu-origin traditional medicine system of ayurveda, drinking water stored in the copper lota has health and nutritional benefits. It is used for jala neti, a traditional ayurvedic and yogic practice that is used for cleansing the nose and sinus passages through nasal irrigation.

=== Sacred ceremonies ===
In the Indian-origin religions, the lota is a multi-purpose utensil. It is also used in the sacred rituals, such as yajna, puja, for wedding rituals, and other sacred ceremonies.

=== Cleansing ===
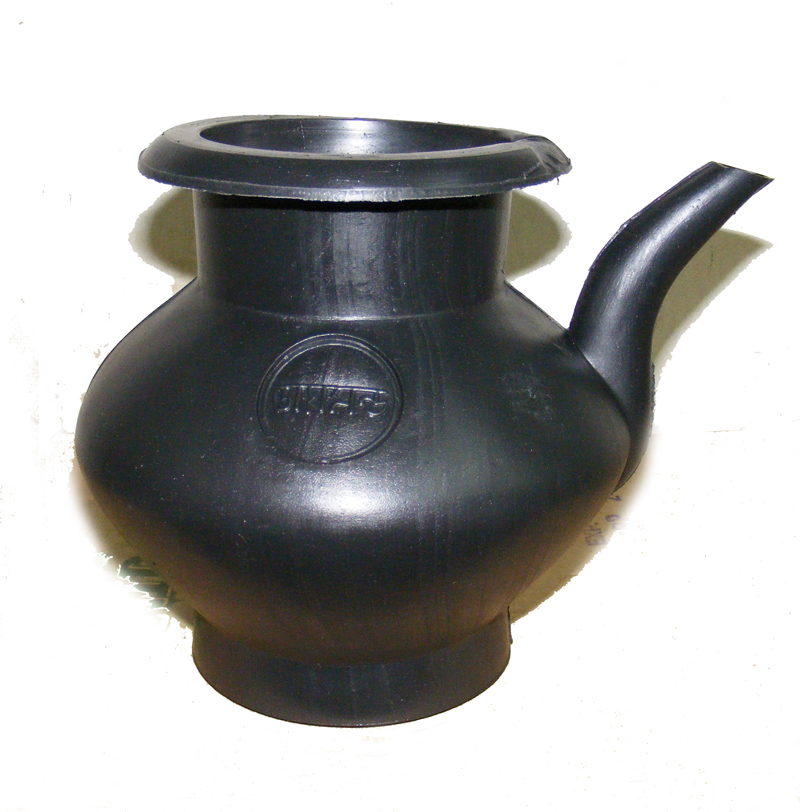
The bodna, a spouted lota variation used in Bengal.

Throughout the Indian subcontinent, the lota is commonly used to assist with hygiene, such as during baths or anal cleansing.

In Bengali, the term lotā is used for bath mugs.

== See also ==
- Aftabeh, a similar vessel used in Iran, Azerbaijan, and Central Asia
- Ghatam, a large water pot related to the lota design
- Kalasha, a metal pot used in Hindu rites—the lota is a type of falsha
- Anal cleansing, for which a lota is commonly used
