= Madhukar Keshav Dhavalikar =

Indian archaeologist (1930–2018)

- Born: 16 May 1930; Patas, Pune, Bombay State
- Died: 27 March 2018 (aged 87)

Madhukar Keshav Dhavalikar (M. K. Dhavalikar; 16 May 1930 – 27 March 2018) was an Indian historian and archaeologist.

== Life and career ==
Dhavalikar was born in 1930 at Patas, Bombay State (now Maharashtra). He received B.A. in Economics and Political Science in 1952 and M.A. in 1958. He received Ph.D. in Archaeology in 1964 from University of Poona for work in ancient Indian Culture and Archaeology,

He served the Archaeological Survey of India as Technical Assistant from 1953 to 1965. He was a lecturer in Ancient Indian History Culture and Archaeology at the Nagpur University from 1965 to 1967. He served Deccan College, Pune, as Reader in Ancient Indian History Culture and Archaeology from 1967 to 1980, and as Professor from 1980 to 1990. He held the positions of Joint-Director (1982–1985) and Director (1985–1990).

Along with Z. D. Ansari, he conducted excavations at Kayatha during 1967-68. Dhavalikar dated the discovered site to a period spanning from 2400 BCE to 2000 BCE (though Gregory Possehl places it between 2200 BCE and 2000 BCE).

The master archaeologist undertook excavations at Paunar (Maharashtra), Kayatha (Madhya Pradesh), Guwahati (Assam), Inamgaon (Maharashtra), Hoggadehalli (Karnataka), Prabhas Patan and Kuntasi (Gujarat), Ape-gaon, Kandhar, Kaothe and Walki (Maharashtra), which encompassed the past from Harappan to medieval history. (Sites are cited chronologically.) All these excavations were followed by comprehensively published reports, some of which are recognised as classics of the field. (Shreenand L. Bapat, Obituary Notice, Annals of the Bhandarkar Oriental Research Institute, Vol. 95, pages 173-175.)

Fifteen researchers received their doctoral degrees under his guidance.

Prof. Dhavalikar was elected a Trustee of the Bhandarkar Oriental Research Institute in 1987. He was unanimously re-elected five times and served in that office till 2013.

== Honours ==
He was awarded the fellowship of the Bombay Branch of the Royal Asiatic Society (2010) and the first Tagore National Fellowship of the Government of India in the same year. In 2011 he received Padma Shri, the fourth highest civilian award of the country. The Indian History Congress elected him its General President in 1999. He was a member of the Culture Group of the Planning Commission, and member of a number of committees and cultural delegations of the Government of India. His consultancy was sought by various apex bodies like the ASI, National Museum, National Institute of Design, Chhatrapati Shivaji Maharaj Vastu Sangrahalaya (Mumbai), etc. He was invited by several institutions of international and national repute to deliver learned lectures.

== Publications ==
- The Aryans: Myth and Archaeology 2007
- Archaeology of Western India 2003
- Environment and Culture: a Historical Perspective 2002
- Historical archaeology of India 1999
- Indian Protohistory 1997
- Kuntasi, a Harappan Emporium on West Coast 1996 (Co-authors: M. R. Raval and Y. M. Chitalwala)
- Cultural Imperialism: Indus Civilization in Western India 1995
- The First Farmers of the Deccan 1988
- Excavations at Inamgaon Volume 1, Part 1 1988 (Co-authors: H. D. Sankalia and Z. D. Ansari}
- Studies in Indian Archaeology 1985 (Co-authors: H. D. Sankalia and S. B. Deo)
- Late Hinayana Caves of Western India 1984
- Excavations at Kayatha 1975 (Co-author: Z. D. Ansari)
