= Malwa culture =

Archaeological culture in India

The Malwa culture was a Chalcolithic archaeological culture which existed in the Malwa region of Central India and parts of Maharashtra in the Deccan Peninsula. It is mainly dated to c. 1600 – c. 1300 BCE, but calibrated radiocarbon dates have suggested that the beginning of this culture may be as early as c. 2000-1750 BCE.

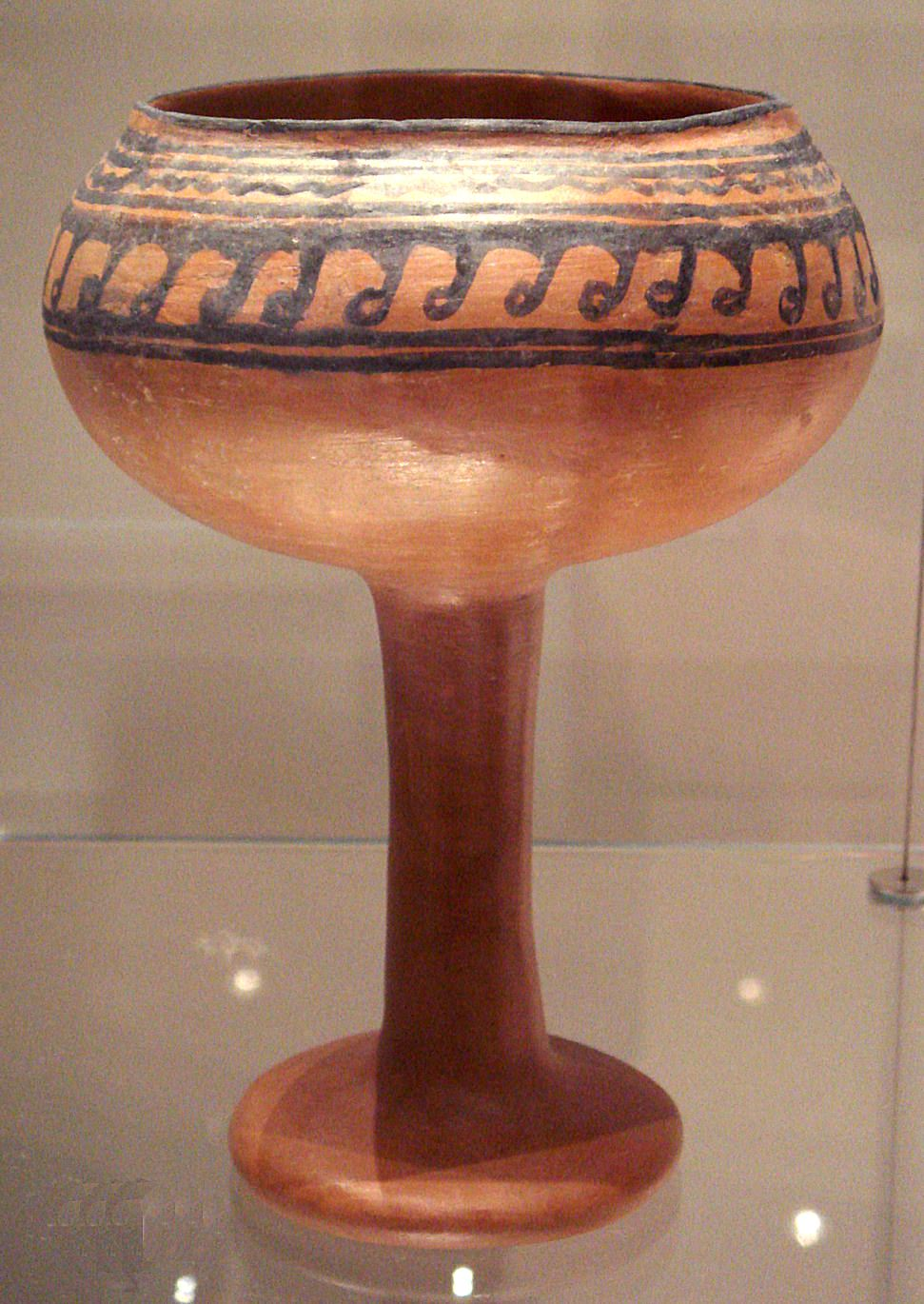
Ceramic goblet from Navdatoli, Malwa, 1300 BCE.

This culture is characterized by the increasing dominance of the agricultural way of life, but also incorporated pastoralist and hunting groups. The people cultivated wheat, barley, legumes, and later rice, and domesticated cattle, sheep, goats, and pigs. At most of the settlements, there is no evidence of urban planning, rather a "haphazard" distribution of houses, but some of the largest sites have evidence of planned settlement, large houses, and public architecture. Most dwellings were round huts made from wattle-and-daub. There are also small round huts used for storing grain, and large rectangular structures which may have been used for religious performances.

Their pottery was red or orange, and painted with geometric, floral, animal, and human designs in black. Copper and stone were used to make tools. Beads of semi-precious stones have been found. Objects made from seashells indicate trade with coastal communities in Gujarat, such as Bharuch. Evidence of religion includes bull idols, worship of trees, snakes, and goddesses, and altars for fire sacrifices.

Sites of the Malwa Culture include Daimabad, Inamgaon, Kayatha, Nagda, Vidisha, Eran, Mandsaur, and Navdatoli (near Maheshwar).

It is preceded by the Kayatha, Ahar-Banas, and Savalda cultures, and succeeded by the Jorwe culture and the Black and red ware culture.

== See also ==
- History of Madhya Pradesh
- Pottery in the Indian subcontinent
