= Kindi (vessel) =

Type of pitcher found in india

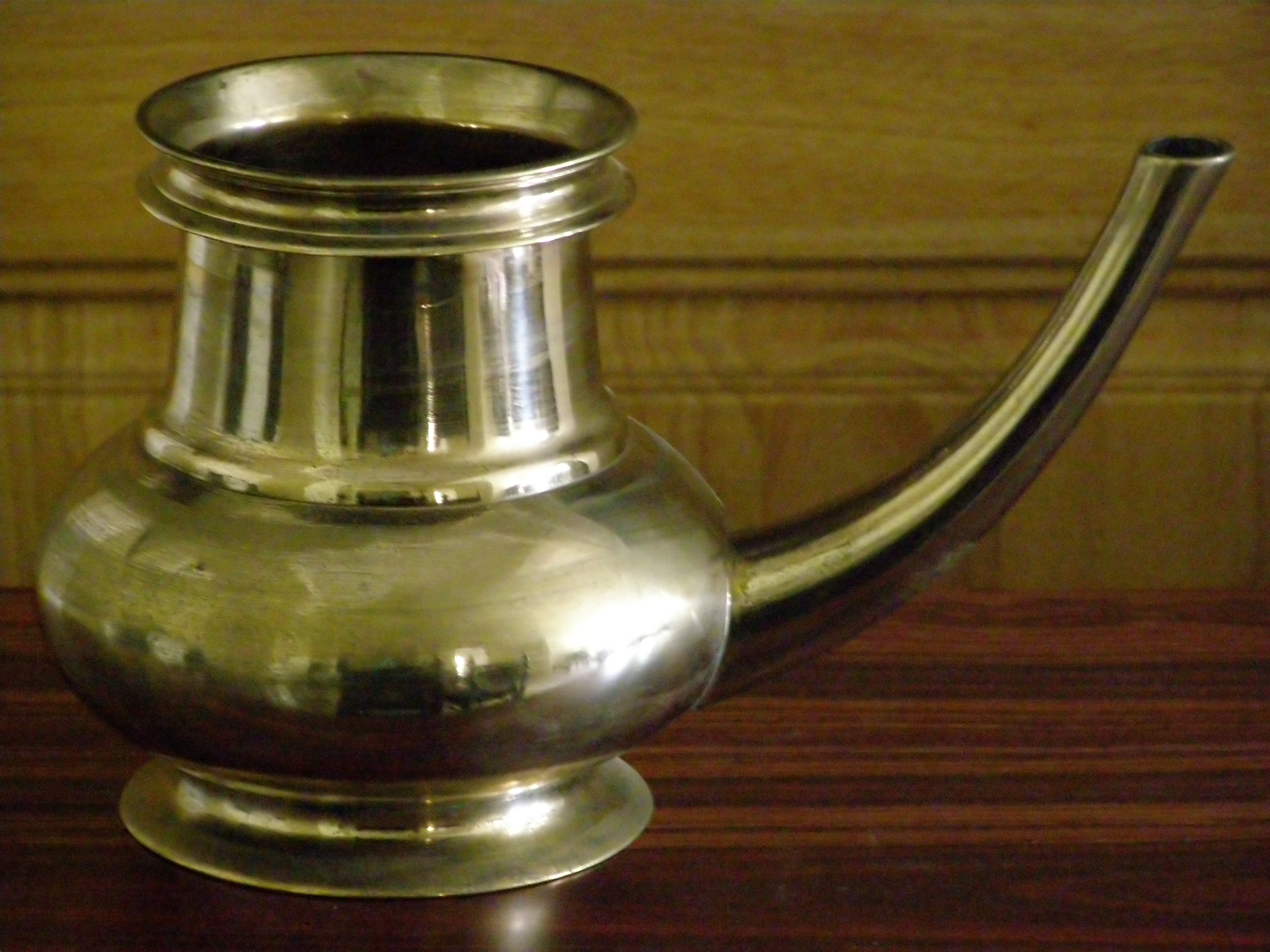
Kindi

A Kindi is a type of pitcher usually found in old houses in Kerala and other parts of India.

The word Kindi is derived from the word kuṇḍikā, kuṇḍa, kuṇḍī, kuṇḍaka meaning "water pot" or "water sprinkler".

Early examples of Kindi first appear in the Chalcolithic period cultures of South Asia, notably in the Savalda Culture. There are two well-preserved examples from the Jorwe culture pottery dating to 2nd millennium BC.

Kindi is usually made of bell metal. It is commonly used during puja to dispense holy water. They are also used to keep water at the entrance of a house so that visitors can wash their feet, and also to wash hands after meals.

The shape is very effective to minimize water loss while washing the feet or hands, as it has only a small aperture to pour water. Its shape is also very attractive. While using a Kindi, the hands of the user never touch the water inside the Kindi, so that water never gets contaminated.

== Material and manufacture ==
In Kerala the kindi is usually cast in bell metal, an alloy of copper and tin. The main centres of the craft are Mannar in Alappuzha district and Kunhimangalam in Kannur district. At Kunhimangalam the alloy is mixed at roughly four parts copper to one of tin. The vessels are made by lost-wax casting: a clay core is coated with beeswax and shaped, covered with more clay, and heated so the wax drains away, after which molten metal is poured into the hollow and left to cool before the mould is broken. The same workshops cast other household pieces such as the uruli, lamps and temple bells.

== See also ==
- Lota (vessel)
- Kundika Upanishad
- Kamandalu
- Kalasha
