= Sachida Nagdev =

Indian artist (1939–2017)

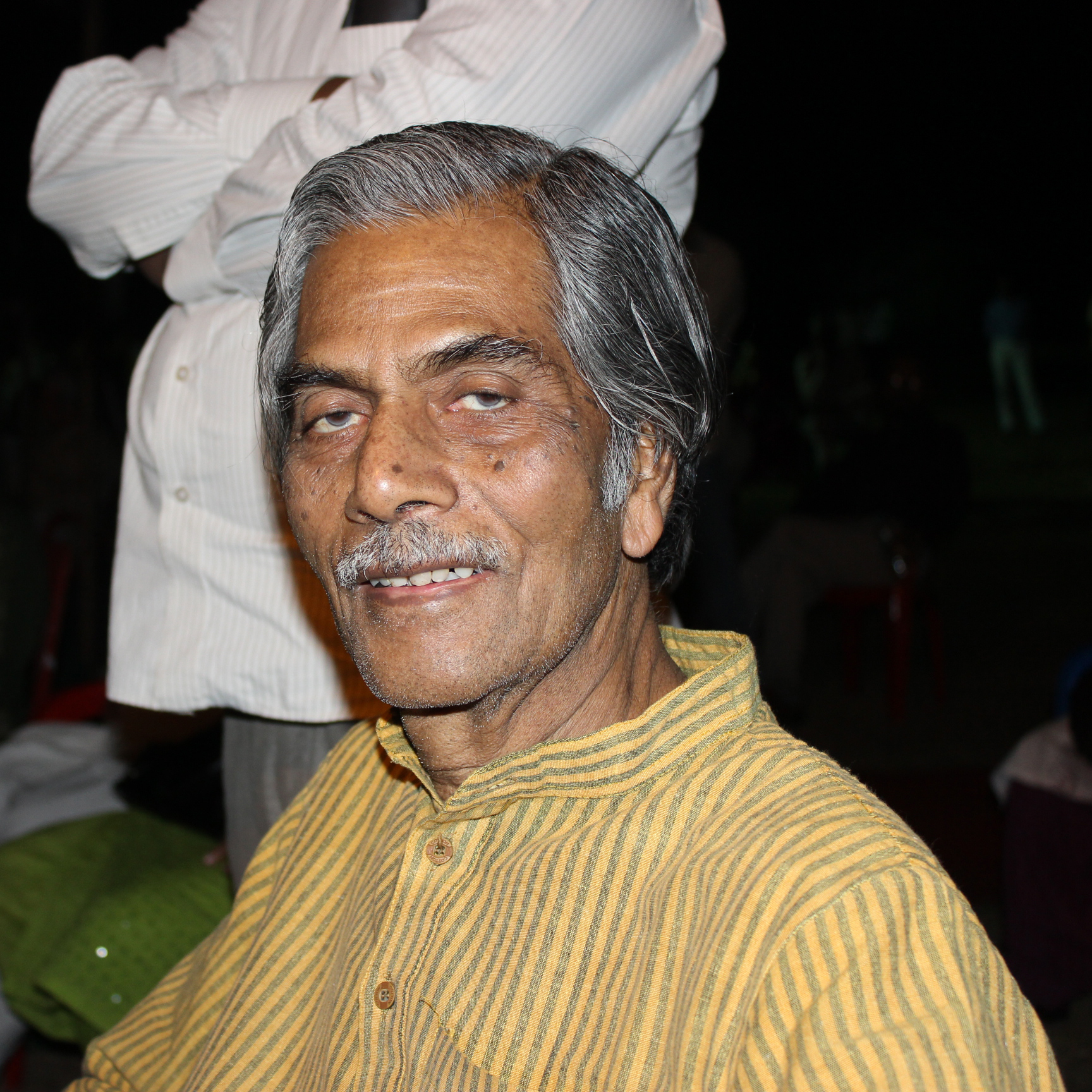
- Sachida Nagdev
- Born: 25 October 1939; Ujjain, Central India Agency, British India (now in Madhya Pradesh, India)
- Died: 29 May 2017 (aged 77); Bhopal, India
- Known for: Painter
- Awards: Shikhar Samman (1997)
- Website: www.sachidanagdev.com

Sachida Nagdev (25 October 1939 – 29 May 2017) was an Indian painter based in central Indian town of Bhopal.

Nagdev is best known for his abstract oil paintings in harmonious colors, though his later works include some representational art including human figures. He was one of the first few Indian artists to experiment fusion of Indian miniature Painting style with modern abstract style. He is a recipient of Shikhar Samman – highest civilian honor bestowed by MP Government.

Nagdev died on 29 May 2017, at the age of 77.

== Early life and education ==
At the age of 9, Nagdev started learning from signboard painters and assisting them, often working on movie hoardings and advertisement banners. He then studied fine art at Bharti Kala Bhavan, Ujjain, under the guidance of Dr. V.S. Wakankar, renowned archaeologist and artist. He assisted Dr. Wakankar in discovering and cataloging cave paintings of Bhim Betka – a UNESCO World Heritage Site. Nagdev graduated from Sir J. J. School of Art, Bombay in 1961 and received an M.A. in ancient Indian History and Culture in 1962. In 1970, he was awarded an M.A. in Painting from Vikram University, Ujjain.

- 1961 J.J. School of Arts, Bombay
- 1962 M.A. in Ancient Indian History and Culture, Vikrarm University, Ujjain
- 1970 M.A. in Painting, Vikrarm University, Ujjain

== Art career ==
Nagdev participated in around 40 solo and group exhibitions, in India, Nepal, Germany, Japan, and the UAE. His art works are in many important collections, including the National Gallery of Modern Art, Delhi, India and Osaka Contemporary Art Center, Japan.

== Solo exhibitions ==
- 1976 All India Artist Camp, Bhopal
- 1986 Mandu
- 1992 Mussorie
- 1993 Bijapur
- 1993 International Artist Camp Gulbarga
- 1981 Gallery Kasahara Osaka, Japan
- 1974 Gallery in Amtsgericht Bad Vilbel. W. Germany
- 1987 Continental Hotel, Sharjah, U.A.E.
- 1973 Maison Des Jeunes, Chamonix, France
- 1969 Indian Cultural Centre, Kathmandu
- 1967 Royal Art Academy, Kathmandu
- 1989 Prague. Czechoslovakia
- 1990–93 Osaka Triennale, Japan
- 1994 12 Artists, Pao Galleries – Hong Kong Art Centre, Hong Kong organized by Sarala's Art International

== Participation in Artist Camps ==
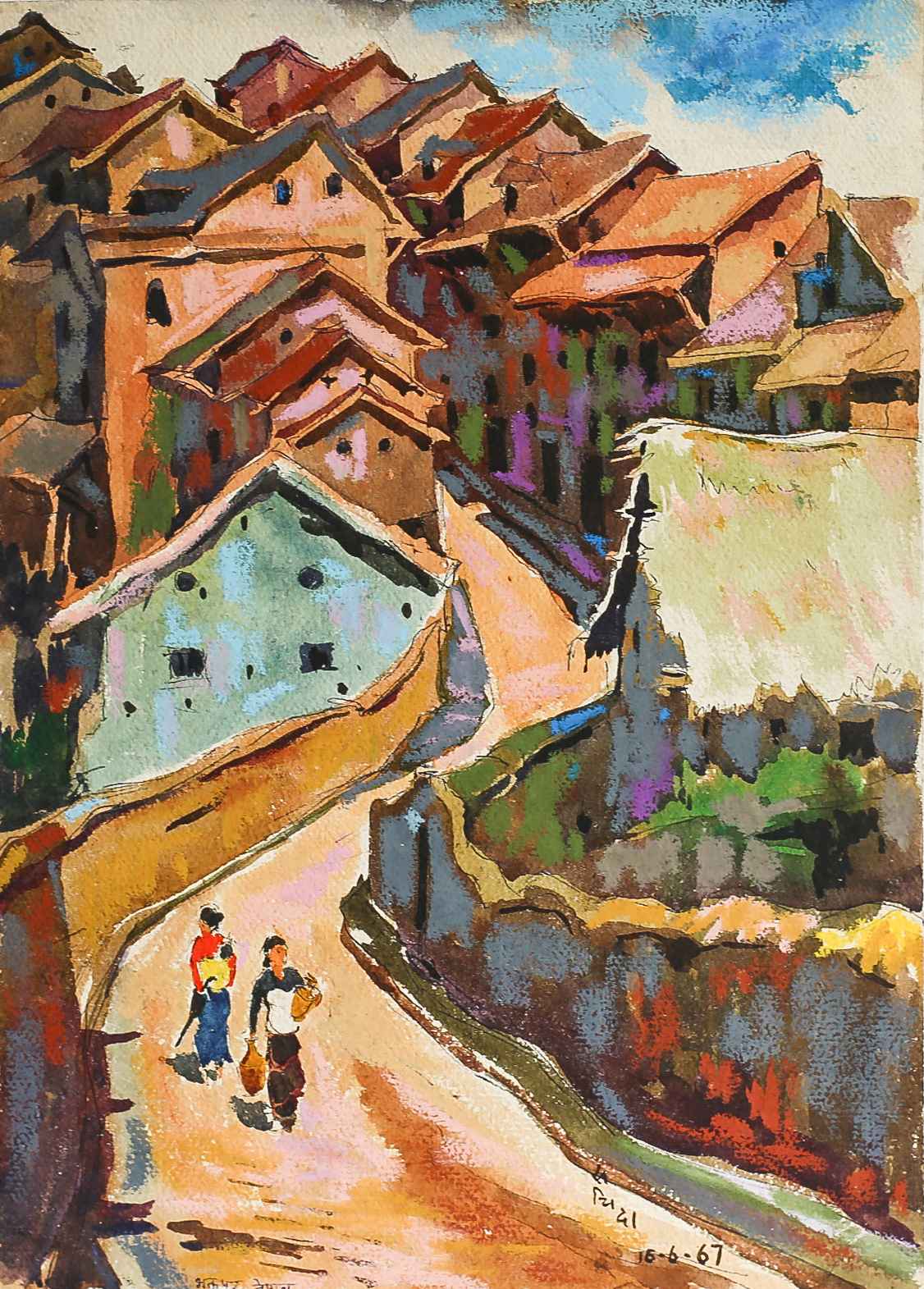
Bharatpur, Nepal. Gouache on Paper. (1967)

- All Indian Artist's Camp Bhopal 1976
- Mandu 1986
- Masoorie, 1992
- Bijapur 1994
- Bharat Bhawan, Bhopal 1996
- Artists Circle Camp at Taj Hotel, Chennai 1997
- Art in Industry Camp, Tata Nagar, Jamshedpur 1998
- International Camp, Gulberga, Karnataka 1993
- Aurodhan Gallery and Shereton Hotel, Chennai 2000
- Aurodhan Gallery and Taj Krishna, Hyderabad 2001
- Art World and Rotary Club as Pondicherry 2001
- Kala Parishad Bhopal 2001
- All India Camp Kurkshetra University, 2003
- India French Artist Camp, Pondicherry, 2005
- National Art Fair, Indore 2005
- National Art Fair, Gwalior 2006

== Commissions and collections ==
- Osaka Contemporary Art Center, Japan
- National Gallery of Modern Art, New Delhi
- Lalit Kala Academy, New Delhi
- Gallery of Modern Art, Jaipur
- Birla Art Academy, Calcutta
- Citi India Corporate Collection
- State Art Gallery, Bhopal & Gwalior, M.P.
- Sri Chitralayam Art Museum, Kerala
- Roopankar Museum of Modern Art, Bharat Bhawan, Bhopal
- Air India Collection, Bombay
- U.B. House TITAN, Bangalore
- Madhya Pradesh Legislative Assembly, Bhopal

== Awards ==
- Shankar's International Children's Art Competition, New Delhi 1954, 1955
- All India Tagore Art Exhibition, Indore 1961 (Silver Plaque)
- Scene Art-Exhibition, M.P. 1960, 1962 (Merit Award)
- All India Art Exhibition, Gwalior 1959 (Merit Award)
- All India Kalidas Exhibition, Ujjain 1967 (Merit Award)
- State Art Exhibition, Bhopal 1973 (Best Painting Award)
- All India Ram Charit Manas Exhibition, Bhopal 1976 (Merit Award)
- Yomiuri Telecasting Award, Osaka Triennale, Japan 1990
- Shikhar Samman – highest civilian honor conferred by M.P. Government, 1997 (Lifetime Achievement)
