= V. S. Wakankar =

Indian archaeologist (1919–1988)

Vishnu Shridhar Wakankar
- Born: 4 May 1919; Neemuch, Madhya Pradesh
- Died: 3 April 1988 (aged 68); Singapore
- Education: G. D. (Art), M. A. and Ph. D.
- Known for: Discovering the Bhimbetka rock caves.
- Awards: Padmashree in 1975

Vishnu Shridhar Wakankar (4 May 1919 – 3 April 1988) was an Indian archaeologist. Wakankar is credited with the discovery of the Bhimbetka rock caves in 1957 and the Kayatha culture in 1964, among others. In 2003, UNESCO inscribed the Bhimbetka rock caves as a World Heritage Site. The Bhimbetka rock caves exhibit one of the earliest traces of human life in India.

== Activities of Wakankar Shodh Sansthan ==
=== Rock arts ===
Wakankar (honorifically called the "Pitamaha" i.e. grandfather of Rock Art School in India) had carried out extensive work on Rock Art in India and abroad since 1954. In this connection, he studied rock arts in UK, Austria, France, Italy, Germany, Spain, Greece, Mexico, Egypt and USA.

With co-workers including Surendrakumar Arya, Daljit Kaur, Girish Chandra Sharma, Narayan Vyas, Giriraj, Kailash Pande, Pancholiji, Jitendradutta Tripathi, Bharati Shrotri, Dubey as well as U. N. Mishra, Lothar Banke, Irwin Mayer and Robert Brooks he did extensive research in the field of rock arts.

Wakankar discovered and studied more than 4000 rock caves in India and also discovered rock shelter paintings in Europe and America, dating of Indian artists activities date back to 40,000 years ago.

Today "Wakankar Shodh Sansthan" boasts of a private collection of about 7500 sketches of Rock art paintings sketched by Wakankar of which about 4000 are those discovered by Wakankar.

=== Archeological surveys ===
Beginning in 1954, Wakankar along with his students Sachida Nagdev, Muzaffar Qureshi, Rahim Guttiwala, explored the ravines of Chambal and Narmada rivers and carried out excavations at Maheshwar (1954), Navada Toli (1955), Manoti (1960), Awara (1960), Indragadh (1959), Kayatha (1966), Mandsaur(1974, 1976), Azadnagar(1974), Dangawada (1974, 1982), Verconium Roman site in England (1961) and Incoliev in France (1962), Runija (1980).

=== Numismatics and epigraphy ===
An expert in the field of numismatics and epigraphy Wakankar collected and studied about 5500 coins ranging from 5th Century B. C. onwards. These are today the pride collection of the "Wakankar Shodh Sansthan".

Jagannath Dubey, Murali Reddy, Narayan Bhatiji have contributed immensely to this Herculean task of collection and painstaking study. Apart from this, he studied more than 15000 coins at Ujjain.

Similarly, ranging from 2nd Century B. C. is a collection of about 250 inscriptions in Sanskrit, Prakrit, Brahmi languages which enriches the collection of "Wakankar Shodh Sansthan".

=== Epilogue ===
Wakankar continued his research in ancient archaeology and ancient Indian history. He was responsible for tracing the basin of the now-dried-up Saraswati river, that is said to hold secrets to much of the Indian civilization. The institutions he founded are alive today and can be visited in Ujjain.
