= Jorwe culture =

Chalcolithic culture in India

The Jorwe culture was a Chalcolithic archaeological culture which existed in large areas of the Deccan region in what is now Maharashtra state in Western India, and also reached north into the Malwa region of Madhya Pradesh. It is named after the type site of Jorwe. The early phase of the culture is dated to c. 1400-1000 BCE, while the late phase is dated to c. 1000-700 BCE.

Over 200 settlements of the Jorwe culture have been found, ranging from several large and medium-sized farming villages, to many small villages, as well as temporary and seasonal camp-sites used by pastoralists. It likely reflects a chiefdom level of social organization. The largest settlement was Daimabad, which had a mud fortification during this period, as well as an elliptical temple with fire pits. Some settlements show evidence of planning in the layout of rectangular houses and streets or lanes. Most dwellings were small, single-room dwellings, but the chiefs lived in large houses with multiple rooms, and had granaries to store grain.

The pottery is red and orange, and painted with geometric patterns in black. Agriculture was largely the same as the earlier Malwa culture, including wheat, barley, and legumes, but with the addition of new kinds of millet. The people traded with Karnataka for gold and ivory, and with coastal India (Gujarat and Konkan) for fish, conch shell, and haematite. Their dead were typically buried with the feet cut off, in urns which were placed under house floors or courtyards. Most Jorwe culture sites were abandoned around 1000 BCE, possibly due to famine or drought, and the remaining sites show signs of increased poverty until their abandonment c. 700 BCE.

Sites of the Jorwe culture include Jorwe, Daimabad, Inamgaon, Prakashe, Navdatoli (near Maheshwar), Walki (in Pune District).

The Jorwe culture was preceded by the Malwa culture and succeeded by the Iron Age megalithic culture of the Deccan, and the Northern Black Polished Ware culture.

== See also ==
- History of Maharashtra
- Pottery in the Indian subcontinent
