= Navdatoli =

Navdatoli नव्दातोदी Nawdatodi
- Ancient Village
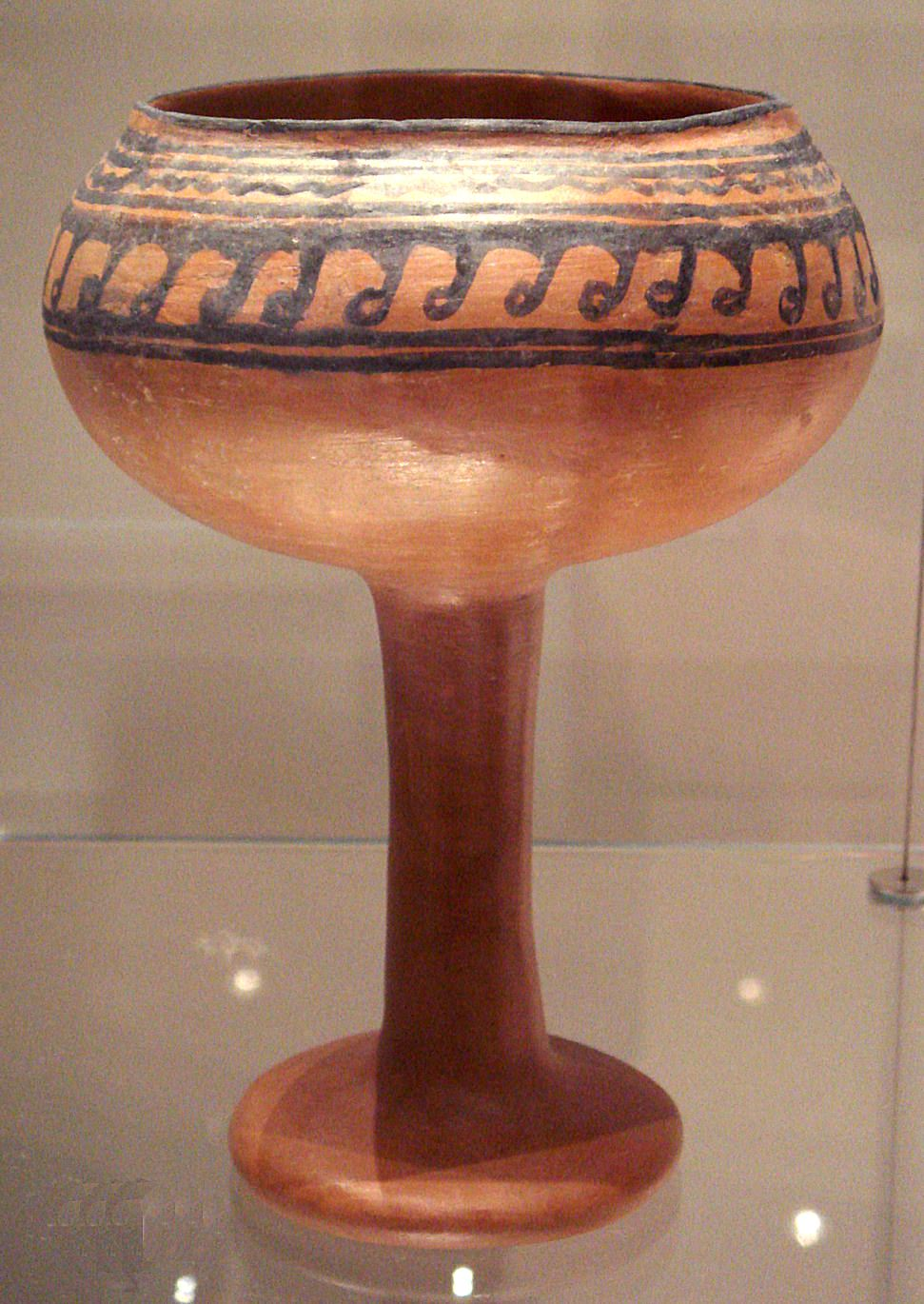
- Ceramic goblet from Navdatoli, Malwa, 1300 BCE; Malwa culture

- Location within Madhya Pradesh
- Coordinates: 22.162°N 75.583°E
- Country: India
- State: Madhya Pradesh

Navdatoli is the name of a modern day village, but can also refer to a Chalcolithic era settlement located on the Narmada River in Madhya Pradesh in central India. The ancient village was inhabited through four temporal stages, each defined by distinct types of pottery. The site was originally excavated between 1957 and 1959 over two seasons. Both the village and the site are located roughly a mile south of the modern day town of Maheshwar.

== History ==
It is an important chalcolithic site located on the opposite side of the Narmada River dating back to 2nd millennium BCE. The region was a stronghold of Buddhism since 2nd century BCE. Kasrawad (6 km southeast of Navdatoli) has many Buddhist remains and stupas which are considered sites of national importance.

== Archaeological Site ==
The archaeological site was defined by 4 distinct mounds and excavated by researchers from Deccan College. Mounds I, II, and III were partially excavated in 1957-1958. Mound IV was completely excavated over two seasons between 1957 and 1959. Numerous rectangular and circular structures were uncovered; These contained most of the artifacts that were found. The houses mostly consisted of a single room and were made of wattle and daub. Lime was used on the floors and walls in an effort to prevent insects from entering the living space. The wattle of the houses were made of either acacia or conifer and were interwoven with bamboo. Most houses had a fireplace and a stone slab that was used for grinding and mashing grain. Pottery of varying styles including Malwa, Jorwe, Black and Red Ware, Cream-Slipped Ware, and Grey-Ware were also commonly found within the houses . Similarities between Navdatoli pottery and certain Iranian ceramics have led some to believe the area was colonized by immigrants from the Northwest. Given the size and number of residences found, along with the length of time the area was occupied, it is estimated that on average roughly 150 individuals lived in the village in its earliest stage. Evidence of domestic animals including Indian cattle, sheep, goats, pigs, and dogs were also found.

== Lithic Production ==
Throughout the roughly 20,000 square feet of area that was excavated, over 30,000 blades, cores, and flakes were found, leading archaeologists to believe the site was a production area for lithic tools. Nearly all of the tools were made of chalcedony from the nearby Narmada River. The same methods of production were used throughout the occupation of the site and it appears that each household was responsible for making their own tools, often the case for contemporary sites. Blades found at Navdatoli were often longer than those found at other sites within the same time period.

== See also ==
- Maheshwar
- Kasrawad
- Inamgaon
