= Kaytha =

Kaytha Kayatha
- village
- Location within Madhya Pradesh
- Coordinates: 23.237°N 76.0189°E
- Country: India
- State: Madhya Pradesh
- District: Ujjain
- Tehsil: Tarana
- Elevation: 495 m (1,624 ft)

Population (2011)
  - Total: 8,040

Language
  - Official: Hindi
- Time zone: UTC+5:30 (IST)
- ISO 3166 code: MP-IN
- Census code: 471803

Kaytha or Kayatha is a village and an archaeological site in the Ujjain district of Madhya Pradesh, India, in the Tarana tehsil, near the city of Ujjain, on the banks of Choti-Kali Sindh river.

In 1964, V. S. Wakankar discovered the archeologically important Kayatha culture here, dating back to more than 4000 years.

== Archaeology ==
Several Chalcolithic sites, with four occupational phases, have been discovered in the Malwa region of central India. The site at Kayatha, situated on the right bank of the Choti Kali Sindh river (a tributary of Chambal river), is the type site of this culture, known as "Kayatha culture".

Excavations conducted by V. S. Wakankar (1965–66), and by M. K. Dhavalikar and Z. D. Ansari (1968) revealed layers from five different periods:

1. Period I: Kayatha culture
2. Period II: Ahar culture
3. Period III: Malwa culture
4. Period IV: Early historical culture
5. Period V: Sunga-Kushan-Gupta culture

Of these, period I to III are Chalcolithic. There are four C-14 dated from period I and three from period III giving a range from 2000 BC to 1200 BC to the Chalcolithic culture at Kayatha.

The Kayatha culture represents the earliest known agriculture settlement in the present-day Malwa region. It also featured advanced copper metallurgy and stone blade industry. Using calibrated radiocarbon, Dhavalikar dated this culture to a period spanning from 2400 BCE to 2000 BCE. However, calibrated dates by Gregory Possehl place it between 2200 BCE and 2000 BCE.

Excavation at Kayatha in 1964-65, revealed the Kayatha culture dates much earlier than the Malwa culture. An interesting aspect is that the earliest occupants used triangular terracota cake-like objects, stone weights, buff ware etc. Depictions of bull, deer, panther and elephants have been discovered later. Interestingly, a clay figure of horse has also been discovered. Dhavalikar also reported that a femoral head bone of a horse has been discovered at the site, and according to him, this strengthens the view that the horse was present at Kayatha Also of archeological and anthropological significance is the parallel between the bull forms from Kayatha and south European sites. Though not much is known about the religious practices of the Kayatha culture but it is suggested that they must have been in contact with OCP people in North and the Harappans.

== Demographics ==
According to the 2011 census of India, Kaytha has a population of 8040, including 4143 males and 3897 females. The sex ratio of the village is 955. The effective literacy rate (excluding children below 6) is 70.5%.
