= Ghargaon =

Village in Maharashtra

Ghargaon (Shrigonda)
- Village
- Location in Maharashtra, India Ghargaon (Shrigonda) (India)
- Coordinates: 18.616°N 74.698°E
- Country: India
- State: Maharashtra
- District: Ahmadnagar
- Established: Unknown
- Founder: Unknown
- Elevation: 561 m (1,841 ft)

Population (2001)
  - Total: 10,000

Languages
  - Official: Marathi
- Time zone: UTC+5:30 (IST)
- PIN: 413728
- Telephone code: 912487
- Vehicle registration: MH-16

Ghargaon is an old village in a Tehsil Shrigonda in Ahmednagar District in the Indian state of Maharashtra. It is located 260 km (160 mi) from its state capital, Mumbai, and 110 km (68 mi) from Pune.

== Geography ==
Located at 18.616°N 74.698°E, the village has an average elevation of 561 m (1840 ft).

Nearby towns are Ahmednagar (41 km (25 mi)), Rahuri (71.5 km (44.4 mi)), Pathardi (73.9 km (45.9 mi)), Nevasa (93.8 km (58.3 mi)), Pune (110 km (68 mi)).

== Transport ==
The village is on State Highway 10 and can be reached by the following means of transportation:

- from Ahmednager – Ghargaon (State Transport Bus)
- From Shirur, Pune – Belwandi (State Transport Bus) – Belwandi Phata – Ghargaon.
- From Daund – Belwandi bk (railway station) by any passenger rail.
