= Karuwa =

Traditional water vessel of Nepal

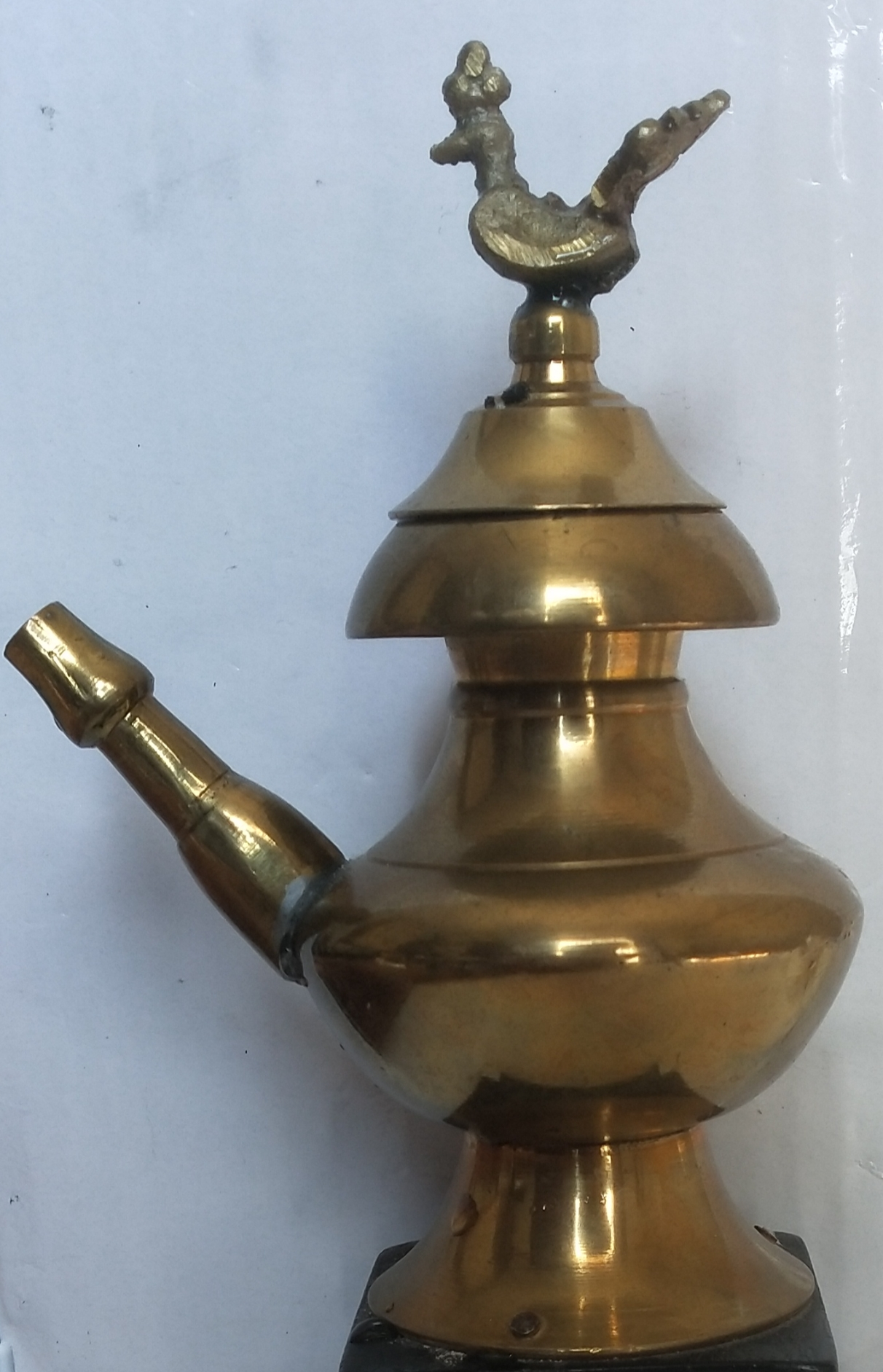
Karuwa, a traditional Nepalese water jar with a spout

Karuwa (Nepali: करुवा) is a traditional vessel used in Nepali households to serve water and liquor. Generally, a karuwa is made of brass for daily use. However, decorative karuwas are made from precious metals such as silver and gold.

== Construction ==
Karuwas have a curved body and a neck to pour liquid, like a kettle. The mouth of the karuwa is covered with a cap that has various artefacts welded to it. To allow smooth pouring when locked, a small hole is also made in the cap to balance air pressure.

== Traditional uses ==
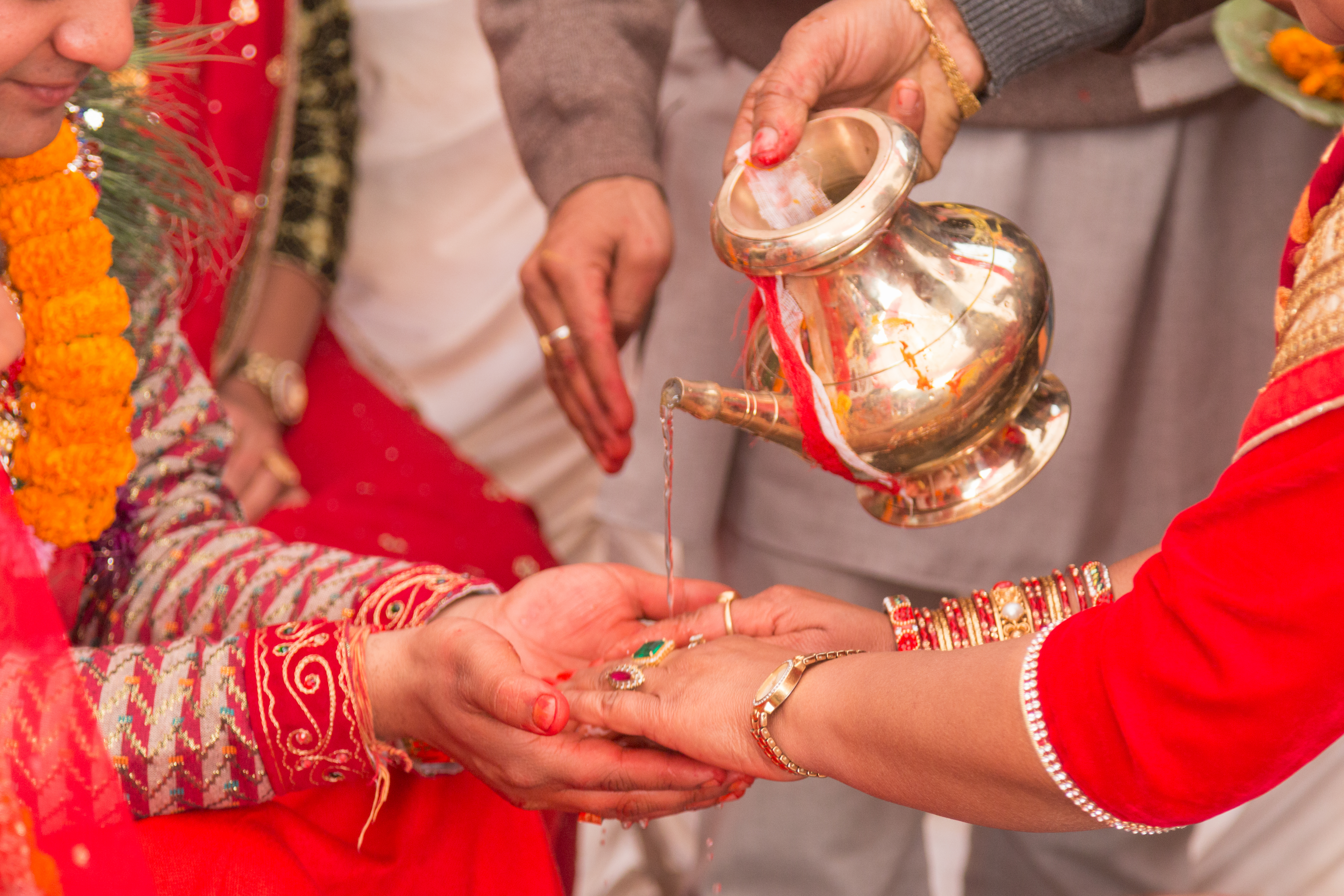
Karuwa, used as a part of ritual in Nepalese Hindu wedding

Karuwa is required in various Nepalese rituals, events and festivals. It is used in various functions such as weddings, bratabandha, Pasni (celebration), etc.

In Newari culture, karuwa is worshipped on the day of Mha Puja, alongside other household utensils and appliances.

== Major manufacturing places ==
Most karuwas in Nepal are manufactured in the Palpa, Sankhuwasabha and Bhojpur districts. However, the industry has shrunk due to lack of demand.

One of the biggest karuwas is found in Palpa district of Nepal and it is considered the biggest of its kind in world. The karuwa is installed outside the Tansen municipality office. The same district has also built the world's largest portable karuwa, which is cast in bronze and weighs 150 kg.

== Gallery ==
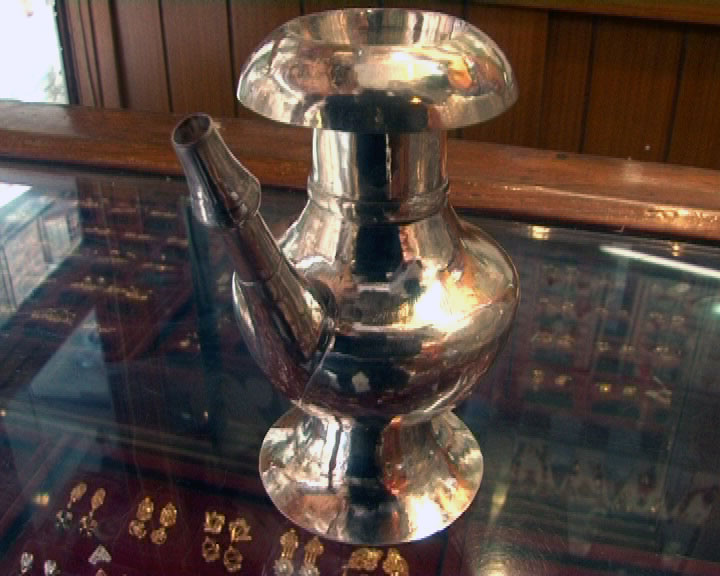
A small karuwa

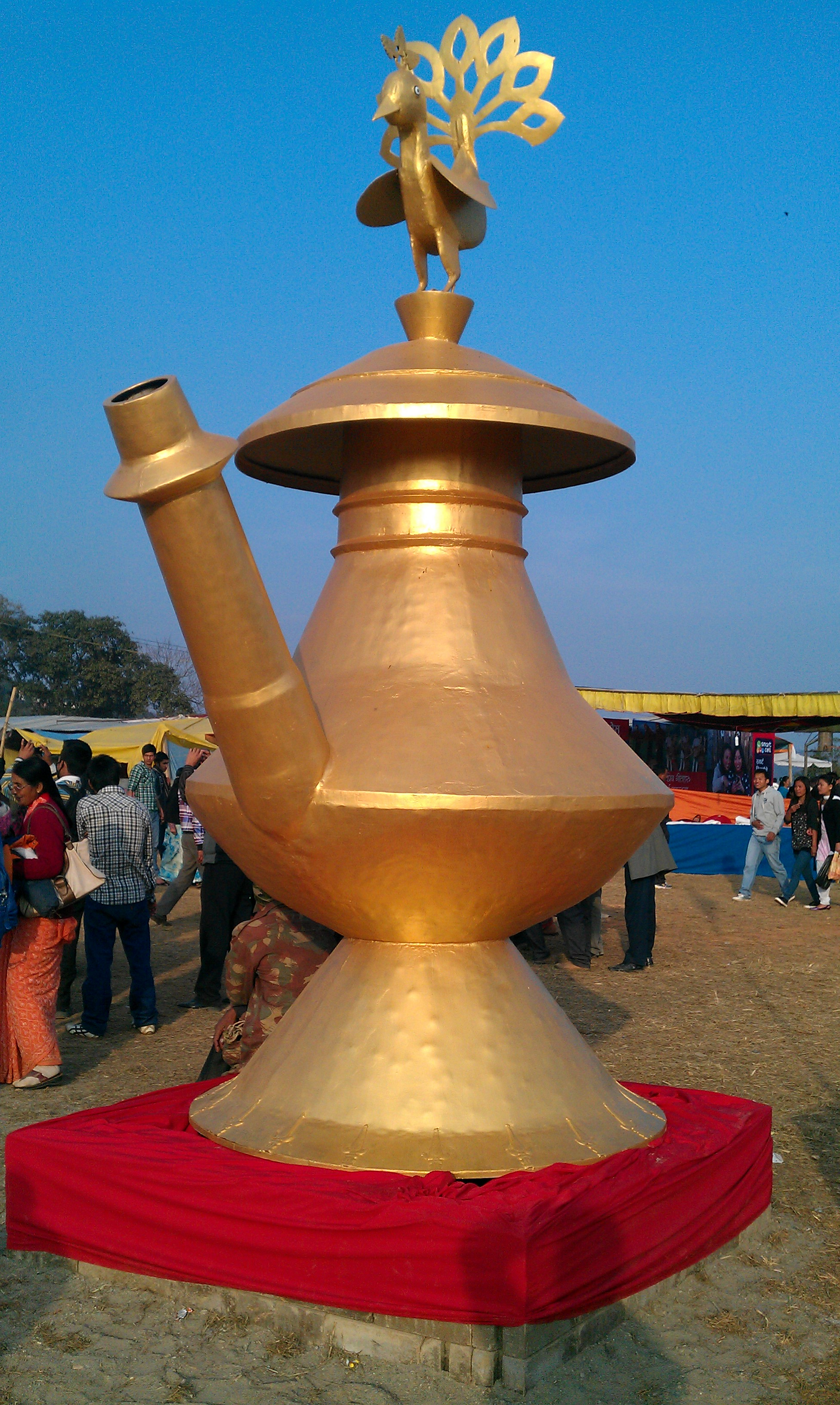
World's largest bronze Karuwa located at Tansen, Nepal

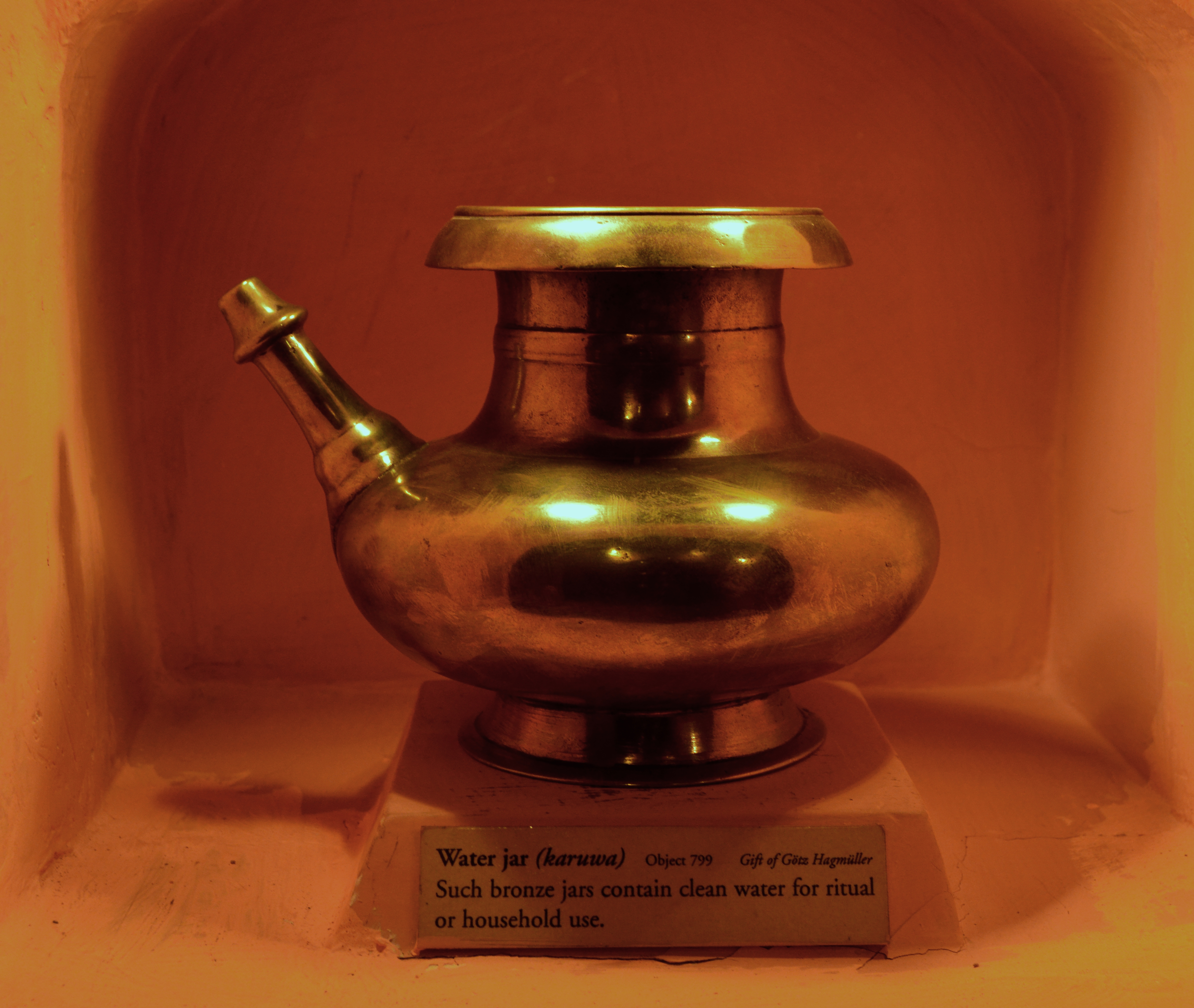
Karuwa in Patan Museum

== See also ==
- Dhaka topi, traditional cap of Nepal
