= Maharashtra Energy Development Agency =

Government agency in Maharashtra, India

Maharashtra Energy Development Agency महाराष्ट्र ऊर्जा विकास प्राधिकरण - महाऊर्जा
- Company type: Public Sector
- Industry: Formulation of the comprehensive State Energy Policy, Implementation of an Energy Sector Improvement Project
- Founded: 26 July 1985
- Headquarters: Aundh, Pune, Maharashtra, India
- Area served: Maharashtra
- Key people: Shri Subhash Dumbare I.A.S (Director-general)
- Products: Energy, Energy resource Management, Renewable Energy & Management
- Parent: Government of Maharashtra
- Website: www.mahaurja.com

Maharashtra Energy Development Agency - MEDA is a Maharashtra government institute run with the Federal Government of India, to regulate energy conservation and to promote the development of renewable energy in Maharashtra State, including solar energy, bio-energy and wind energy. MEDA is working as a State Nodal Agency (SNA) under the aegis of Energy Department, the State of Maharashtra. MEDA is also working as a State Designated Agency (SDA) for implementation of Bureau of Energy Efficiency (BEE),

Ministry of Power, Govt. of India and Government of Maharashtra. the State of Maharashtra. MEDA is also working as a State Designated Agency (SDA) for implementation of Energy Conservation Act, 2001 under the guidance of Bureau of Energy Efficiency (BEE), Ministry of Power, Govt. of India and Government of Maharashtra.

Maharashtra has installed capacity of 6959.76 MW renewable energy projects as on 31 March 2016 (Wind-4661.91 MW, Small Hydro-284.30 MW, Bagasse based co-gen.-1414.75 MW, Biomass Power - 200 MW, MSW & liquid Waste- 3 MW, Industrial Waste - 33.55 MW, Solar Power - 362.25 MW) which & retains its second position in the country. Considering the unique importance of generation of electricity from new and renewable energy sources, MNRE has declared the target for installation of 175 GW RE electricity generation projects in India by 2022. In line with this, comprehensive RE policies has been recently declared for promotion of grid connected & off-grid renewable energy projects in the State. Capacity addition of 14,400 MW is targeted through grid connected projects & various targets are set for installation of off-grid renewable energy projects in the State for next 05 years i.e. by 2020. These steps will definitely increase the contribution of renewable energy sources in the basket of electricity.

MEDA continues its wind monitoring exercise - the largest in the country, with 409 wind monitoring stations installed by March 2016. MEDA has also initiated the solar resource assessment programme in the state. We are the first state in the country to set up Solar Radiation Resource Assessment Stations (SRRA) on its own. SRRA will generate accurate and investment-grade solar radiation data. So far 15 SRRA station have been setup in the state. Also, there is a continuous emphasis on exploiting the potential of other renewable energy sources like solar PV and Industrial Waste.

MEDA has been promoting the Off-grid RE sector as well, along with the grid connected RE power generation. The solar thermal programme has witnessed big strides, with installation of 12.24 lakh sq.m. of solar collector area of solar water heating systems till the date. The other ambitious programme implemented is of common solar study room at gram panchayat level. So far, more than 18603 gram panchayats have been provided with solar home lighting systems which are installed at community places, enabling students to study during night time. It is also worth noting that the largest number of wind-solar hybrid systems with a total of 2074.04 kW capacity have been installed in the state till the year 2015–16. Under Bio-energy segment, till the date 26 off-grid industrial waste to energy projects totaling capacity of 35.388MW, 04 Bio-CNG projects of 46,900 m3/day capacity are commissioned. Along with this, 35 biogas based power generation projects of capacity 489.5 kW (4715 m3) are commissioned & 10 biogas based power generation projects of capacity 417 kW (3475 m3) are likely to be commissioned soon. As a result of promotional policy of MEDA, biomass briquette sector in the state is growing gradually, thereby developing new entrepreneurs, increased income to the farmers & generating employment for rural youths. Till the date 120 briquette projects are benefitted.

   MEDA is also working as the State Designated Agency for energy conservation / energy efficiency activities in the State. The energy conservation activities are being promoted through various schemes from the state budget, including the scheme of installation of energy efficient street lights. Till now, over 138456 street lights in various gram panchayats have been replaced with CFL. The two important schemes launched by MEDA, which give financial assistance for demonstration projects of energy efficiency in government buildings and in urban local bodies, have been receiving enthusiastic response. The schemes relating to energy audit have also gained momentum. These schemes have introduced and strengthened the concept of energy audit in the industry and government sector.

MEDA has received National award for best performance State in Renewable Energy Power addition during period from 1 April 2010 to 31 March 2014 in February 2015. Award was conferred by the Hon’ble Union Minister of State for Power, Coal and New and Renewable Energy (Independent Charge) Govt. of India. Along with this, MEDA has received National Award as the Best State Designated Agency for energy conservation activities for the years 2011–12, 2012–13 and 2013–14, National Awards for excellence in the field of Renewable Energy in various 12 categories from AREAS, National Excellence Award 2016 for Rooftop Solar Power Projects in the Innovations in Solar Energy Category, National Excellence Award for highest number of CST installations in the state of Maharashtra- 2016. It is indeed a matter of pride for MEDA.
