= Inamgaon =

Village in Maharashtra

- village
- Location in Maharashtra, India Inamgaon (India)
- Coordinates: 18°35′20″N 74°32′20″E
- Country: India
- State: Maharashtra
- District: Pune

Population
  - Total: 5,311

Language
  - Official: Marathi
- Time zone: UTC+5:30 (IST)
- PIN: 412210
- Telephone code: 02137
- Vehicle registration: MH 12
- Nearest city: Pune, Shirur
- Sex ratio: 52 : 48 ♂/♀
- Literacy: approx. 80%
- Lok Sabha constituency: Shirur
- Vidhan Sabha constituency: Shirur
- Website: Official Website

Inamgaon is a post-Harappan agrarian village and archaeological site located in Maharashtra, western India. Situated along the right bank of the Ghod River, it is considered to be the 'regional centre' of the Bhima Valley.

Inamgaon is one of the most intensively and extensively excavated and well reconstructed Chalcolithic sites of the Deccan Plateau.

== Geography ==
The village is located around 89 kilometres (55 mi) to the east of the city of Pune. The region, situated within the lower reaches of the Ghod, is characterized by Cretaceous-Eocene Deccan Trap basalt.

== Archaeological site ==
An ancient sites, measuring approximately 550 metres (1,800 ft) by 430 metres (1,410 ft), are located about 3 kilometres (1.9 mi) north of Inamgaon.

There are five mounds at the site. The largest mound is called 'Inamgaon I', and it has been extensively excavated, and studied for its archaeological finds. The site was occupied between 3800-3200 B.P. (calibrated), or 1800-1200 BC.

The Chalcolithic settlement was excavated in order to better understand the early and later Jorwe culture. There are 3 phases of the Chalcolithic that are found at Inamgaon.

The excavation was a landmark in India's archaeology history due to its extensive and systematic process. The excavations revealed multiple cultural phases including Late Jorwe Culture, Early Jorwe Culture, and Malwa Culture. Archaeology findings are available at different museums such as Deccan College Post-Graduate and Research Institute, and Chhatrapati Shivaji Maharaj Vastu Sangrahalaya.

== Current social life ==
The modern day Inamgaon is on developing verge. Farming and Allied business are prime income source for Inamgaon. The Ghod River is being conducive for the cultural and social buildings. Inamgaon have been allotted with two Reservoirs & Small Dams for water storage projects by Maharashtra Water Resources Regulatory Authority. These Reservoirs & Small Dams for water storage helps to store water and ease the water availability. The settlement has all types of Preschool, Primary school & Secondary school. The New English School Inamgaon is a secondary school. Inamgaon farmers have the capital shares in two different cooperative Sugar factory. The Shrigonda Sahakari Sakhar Karkhana and Ghodganga Sugar Factory. The industrial establishments are closer and are conducive for the villager's employment. Inamgaon is catered by Petrol station and Social gathering hall. The settlement is being served by various national banks, however only Pune District Central Cooperative Bank scores the presence. The united capital shares of villagers and Pune District Central Cooperative Bank support have established Cooperative society, which, indeed contributes to needy farmers to have monitory support when requires. This Cooperative society governing body is formed by elective people by the villagers.
