= Daimabad =

Village in Maharashtra

- Archeological site
- Daimabad
- Location within Maharashtra Location within India
- Coordinates: 19°30′37″N 74°42′3″E
- Country: India
- State: Maharashtra
- District: Ahmednagar

Population
  - Total: 9
- Time zone: UTC+5.30 (Indian Standard Time)

Daimabad is a deserted village and archaeological site on the left bank of the Pravara River, a tributary of the Godavari River in Shrirampur taluka in Ahmednagar district of Maharashtra state in India. This site was discovered by B. P. Bopardikar in 1958. It has been excavated three times so far by the Archaeological Survey of India teams. The first excavation in 1958-59 was carried out under the direction of M. N. Deshpande. The second excavation in 1974-75 was led by S. R. Rao. Finally, the excavations between 1975-76 and 1978-79 were carried out under the direction of S. A. Sali. Discoveries at Daimabad suggest that Late Harappan culture extended into the Deccan Plateau in India. Daimabad is famous for the recovery of many bronze goods, some of which were influenced by the Harappan culture.

== Phases of occupation ==
The excavations carried out in 5 m thick occupational deposit exposed evidence of five distinct Chalcolithic cultural phases, based on their characteristic painted ceramics:

- Phase I: Savalda culture (before c.2300/2200 BCE)
- Phase II: Late Harappan culture (c.2300/2200-1800 BCE)
- Phase III: Daimabad culture (black on buff/cream ware) (c.1800-1600 BCE)
- Phase IV: Malwa culture (c.1600-1400 BCE)
- Phase V: Jorwe culture (c.1400-1000 BCE).

There is a break in occupation for about half-a-century between the Phase II (Late Harappan period) and Phase III (Daimabad period).

=== Phase I: Savalda culture ===
The houses of this phase in Daimabad were of mud walls with rounded ends, trilateral, of single room, two rooms and three rooms, with hearths, storage pits and jars. Sometimes there were courtyards in front and in one place, a lane has been traced. The plant remains included barley, lentil, common pea, grass pea and black gram/green gram. The excavation yielded copper-bronze rings, beads of shell, terracotta, carnelian and agate, microliths, tanged arrowheads of bone and stone mullers and querns. A phallus-shaped object made of agate was found inside a house. The ware of this phase was of medium-to-coarse fabric, made on slow wheel and treated with a thick slip showing crackles and turned light-brown, chocolate, red and pink in colour. It was mostly painted in ochre-red colour and only a few cases in black and white pigments. The burnished grey ware, the black burnished corrugated ware and the handmade thick coarse red ware with incised and applied decorations were the other ceramics found.

=== Phase II: Late Harappan culture ===
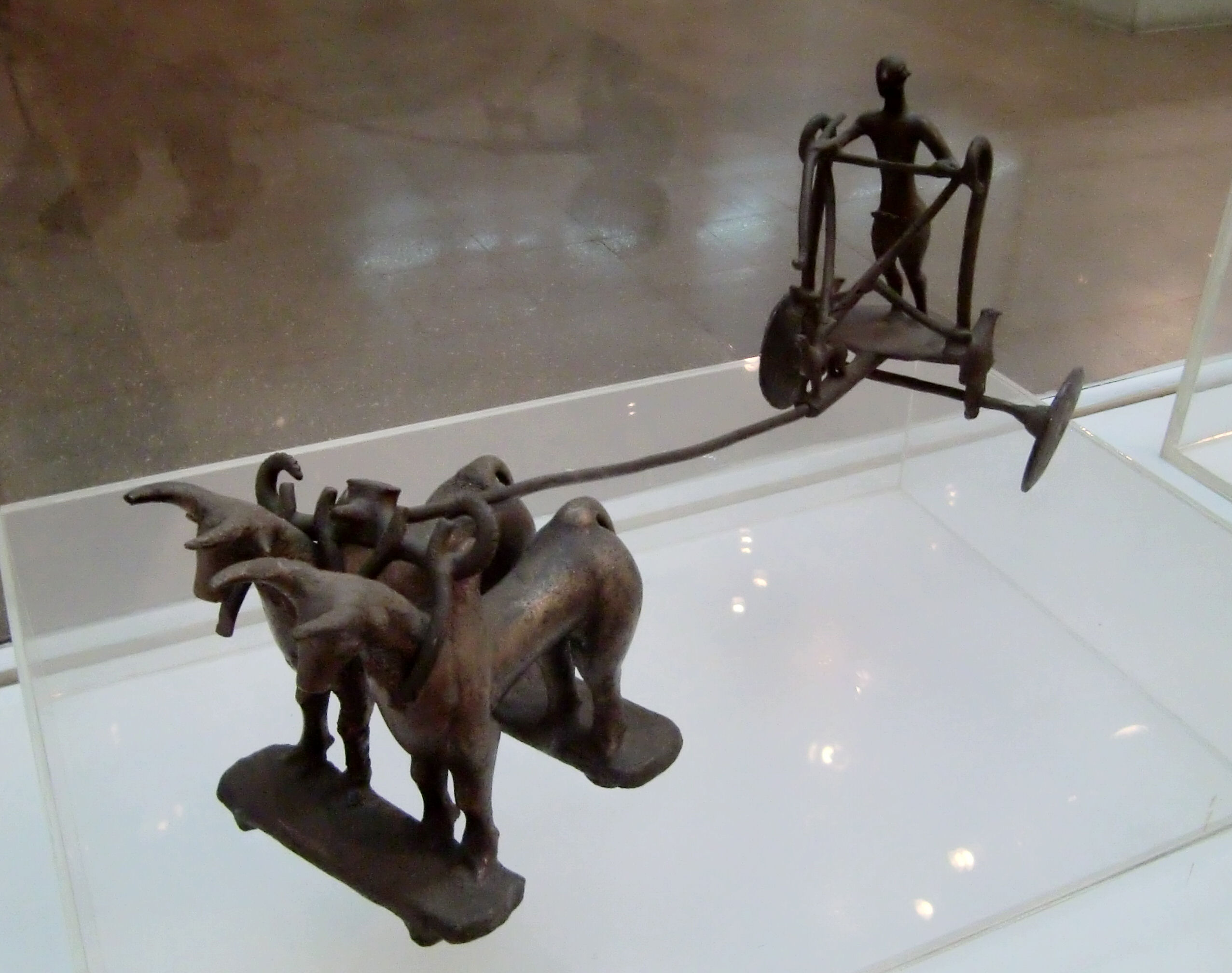
Bull cart, late Harappa figure from Daimabad hoard, c.2000 BCE

During this phase, the size of the settlement increased to about 20 ha. Most of the walls of the houses were destroyed by later disturbances. The walls were made of black clay with their foundations in the black soil. Large patches of finely plastered floors were found in some of the houses. The houses were arranged on either side of a 30–50 cm thick wall made of black clay. A mud-brick lined grave was found within the occupational deposit, consisting of a skeleton laid out in an extended position. The body seems to have been originally covered with reeds of fibrous plants, the fibres of which were found sticking to the skeleton. The main ware was a fine red ware with linear and geometric designs painted on it in black pigment. Its shape included dishes-on-stand, bowls-on-stand, dishes and vases. The most significant discoveries from this phase were two terracotta button-shaped seals with Harappan writings and four inscribed potsherds. Other artifacts found included stone tools such as microlithic blades, beads of gold, stone and terracotta, bangles of shell and a terracotta measuring scale. The plant remains were same as Phase I, except horse gram, which made its appearance for the first time in this phase.

=== Phase III: Daimabad culture ===
The typical pottery of this phase was a black-on-buff-and-cream ware, mainly a slow-wheel-made ceramic, fast-wheel-turned examples. It was treated on the outside with thin slip, flaked off at places, and was painted in black with chiefly geometric designs. Microlithic blades, bone tools, a single piece of worked elephant tusk, beads and a couple of fragments of graduated terracotta rings used perhaps as the measuring devices are the significant finds from this phase. Hyacinth bean was added to the plant remains in this phase. Part of a copper-smelting furnace was found. Three burials found from this phase were of three different types, one pit burial, one post-cremation urn burial and one symbolic burial.

=== Phase IV: Malwa culture ===
A number of structural remains of this phase have been identified. Mud houses in this phase were spacious, usually rectangular, with mud-plastered floors, wooden posts embedded in the thick mud walls and steps leading up to the doorway from outside. A house with furnaces, one with a copper razor, was identified as a coppersmith's workshop. On the basis of the occurrence of fire altars, certain structures were tentatively identified as religious structures. An elaborate structural complex, which besides the residential houses or rooms closely connected with it, included a mud platform, about 18 m long, with fire altars of different shapes and an apsidal mud-wall structure, probably a temple associated with sacrificial activity were also identified. There were 16 burials in this phase, either pit or urn burials. Twigs of a fibrous plant were laid out at the bottom of the pits. The artifacts found in this phase included microlithic blades, copper objects, faience beads, terracotta and bone objects, The plant remains included barley, three types of wheat, finger millet, lentils and pulses. Sugandha bela (Pavonia odorata) probably was used for preparing perfumes. The shapes of the pottery which occurred in this phase, such as the carinated bowl, the handi-type vase with tubular spout, incurved bowl and the lota continued in the Jorwe phase.

=== Phase V: Jorwe culture ===
The settlement increased to about 30 ha during this period. Total 25 houses were uncovered in this phase. The excavators identified the houses of a butcher, lime maker, potter, bead maker and merchant. There were five structural phases within this phase. 11 houses, two kilns and a butcher's hut were found in the first structural phase. Two houses were found in the second structural phase. Five houses were found in both the third and fourth structural phases. Two structures were found in the fifth structural phase. Traces of a mud fortification wall with bastions were discovered. The Jorwe Ware found in the lower levels of this phase, with all its characteristic types and painted designs, was deep-red in colour and had a shining surface similar to the Lustrous Red Ware. The associated wares were the burnished grey ware and the thick coarse handmade ware. The artifacts found from this phase included microliths, copper objects, beads and terracotta figurines. A cylinder seal of terracotta depicting a scene of procession through forest, a horse-drawn cart, followed by a deer looking majestically at the back and in front an animal with a long neck, probably a camel was also found. The crop remains found in this phase included almost similar to the earlier phase, with the addition of three new types of millets, kodon millet, foxtail millet and jowar. Out of the total 48 burials found in this phase, 44 were urn burials, 3 were extended pit burials and one was an extended burial in an urn.

== Daimabad hoard ==
The most interesting discovery from the site is a hoard of four bronze objects by a local farmer, Chhabu Laxman Bhil, in 1974. He found these artifacts while digging at the base of a shrub in Daimabad village. Then he gave them to the reputed person of the village, Lal Hussein Patel (social Worker). Lal Patel informed Archaeological survey of India later hoard was acquired by the Archaeological Survey of India and presently are in the Chhatrapati Shivaji Maharaj Vastu Sangrahalaya in Mumbai. The Sculpture of a chariot is presently in National Museum, New Delhi.

The hoard comprises:

1. a sculpture of a chariot, 45 cm long and 16 cm wide, yoked to two oxen, driven by a man 16 cm high standing in it;
2. a sculpture of a water buffalo, 31 cm high and 25 cm long standing on a four-legged platform attached to four solid wheels;
3. a 25 cm high sculpture of an elephant on a platform 27 cm long and 14 cm wide similar to the water buffalo sculpture, but axles and wheels missing;
4. a sculpture of a rhinoceros 19 cm high and 25 cm long standing on two horizontal bars, each attached to an axle of two solid wheels.

The archaeologists are not unanimous about the date of these sculptures. On the basis of the circumstantial evidence, M. N. Deshpande, S. R. Rao and S. A. Sali are of view that these objects belong to the Late Harappan period. But on the basis of analysis of the elemental composition of these artifacts, D. P. Agarwal concluded that these objects may belong to the historical period. His conclusion is based on the fact these objects contain more than 10% Arsenic, while no Arsenical alloying has been found in any other Chalcolithic artifacts.

== See also ==
- Indus Valley civilisation
- List of Indus Valley Civilisation sites
- List of inventions and discoveries of the Indus Valley Civilisation
- Hydraulic engineering of the Indus Valley Civilisation
