= Pune District Central Cooperative Bank =

Public sector bank in Pune, India

Pune District Central Cooperative Bank पुणे जिल्हा मध्यवर्ती सहकारी बँक पुणे
- Company type: Public
- Industry: Banking
- Founded: September 4, 1917
- Headquarters: Pune, Maharashtra, India
- Key people: Dr. Digambar Durgade (chairman); Ajit Pawar (executive director) Dilip Walse-Patil (Director) Dattatray Vithoba Bharne(Director)
- Products: corporate banking, finance and insurance, investment banking, mortgage loans, private banking, private equity, savings,
- Revenue: ▲₹1,059 million (US$11 million)
- Total assets: ₹ 1085 million
- Website: Official website

Pune District Central Cooperative Bank is a major state government public sector bank in Pune district. The establishment is a capital shares around the region.

== History ==
The Co-Operative Societies Act led to the foundation of the PDCC on September 4, 1917. The establishment started with manager and clerk only with ₹ 51,000 capital.
