= Kot Bala =

Archaeological site in Pakistan

Coordinates: 25°26′50.28″N 66°43′38.28″E

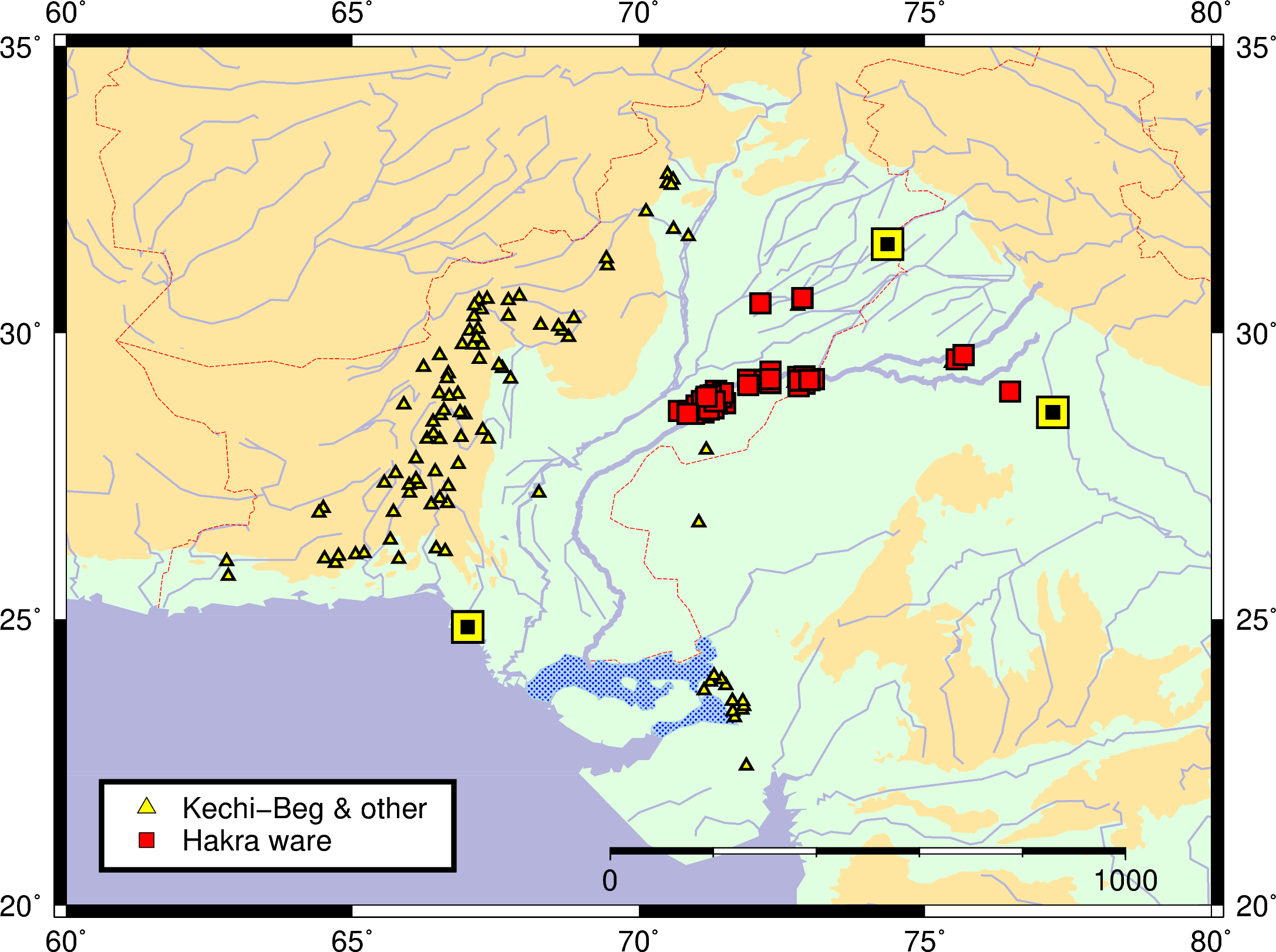
- Pre-Harapan cultures map ca 3600–3200 BC. The big yellow squares are the modern-day Karachi, Lahore, and Delhi. Map includes the ceramics of Kechi Beg and Hakra phases. Sites included are Rehman Dheri, Kunal, Haryana, and early Harappa/pre-Harappan pottery on Makran coast of Pakistan
- Interactive map of Kot Bala
- Type: Archaeological site
- Periods: Pre-Harappan to Indus Valley Civilization
- Location: Lasbela District, Balochistan, Pakistan

Site notes
- Excavation dates: 1970s

Kot Bala, or Balakot is an archaeological site located in Lasbela District, Balochistan, Pakistan. It is near the Makran coast of the Arabian Sea, and goes back to around 4000 BC.

The settlement of Balakot precedes the Indus Valley civilization by many centuries. It is located in the interior of the Sonmiani Bay, along the Lasbela coast (the Plain of Las Bela). This site is of importance due to its proximity to the Arabian Sea, and is believed to have been a main harbour, from which the Indus traders sailed to the coasts of the Arabian Peninsula.

== Excavations ==
The site was excavated by Professor George F. Dales of the University of California, Berkeley in the 1970s, but full details were not published. It is the only site in the region that was professionally excavated.

The upper levels of the site belong to Indus Civilization, while the lower levels feature a culture of its own. The arrival of Indus influence was rather sudden.

== Balakot culture ==
The ancient Balakot culture flourished only in this coastal area. The Balakot Phase pottery is known from excavations at Balakot. Three radiocarbon dates from later occupations of this phase indicate the period of 3500–3000 BC. Other archaeologists give the date of 4000 BC for the start of this settlement.

Kech-Makran culture flourished in the Kech River Valley in protohistoric times as early as the fifth millennium BC. Balakot was part of that settlement network.

Pottery of Balakot was all wheel-made red ware, although some storage jars were hand-made. It features complex floral and zoomorphic motifs. There are similarities to the Nal pottery of Baluchistan. Sometimes the use of red or green paint produced a polychrome effect.

A later Balakot Phase pottery closely resembles the style of Amri culture.

== Early furnaces ==
Excavations at pre-Indus levels of Balakot have yielded evidence of an early furnace. The furnace was most likely used for the manufacturing of ceramic objects. Ovens, dating back to the civilization's mature phase (c. 2500–1900 BCE), were also excavated at Balakot.

== See also ==
- Indus Valley civilization
- List of Indus Valley Civilization sites
- List of inventions and discoveries of the Indus Valley Civilization
- Hydraulic engineering of the Indus Valley Civilization

== Literature ==
- Franke-Vogt, U., Balakot Period I: A review of its stratigraphy, and cultural sequence, in South Asian Archaeology 2001
- Franke-Vogt, U., Reopening Research on Balakot: A Summary of Perspectives and First Results. 217–235. in South Asian Archaeology 1995, Edited by Raymond Allchin & Bridget Allchin, The Ancient India and Iran Trust, London (1997)
- Dales, G.F. 1974. Excavations at Balakot, Pakistan, 1973. Journal of Field Archaeology 1: 3–22.
- Dales, G.F. 1979. The Balakot Project: Summary of Four Years Excavations in Pakistan. Pages 241–274 in Taddei, M.(ed.), South Asian Archaeology 1977. (Seminario di Studi Asiatici, Series Minor VI) (Naples, Istituto Universitario Orientale)
- Dales, G.F. 1981. Reflections on five years of Excavations at Balakot. Pages 25–32 in Dani, A.H. (ed.), Indus Civilisation: New Perspectives (Islamabad, Quaid-I-Azam University)
- History of Civilizations of Central Asia: The Dawn of Civilization: Earliest Times to 700 B.C. (Volume 1) / Eds.: A. H. Dani; V. M. Masson (1992)
