= Killi Kechi Beg =

Archaeological site in Balochistan, Pakistan

Killi Kechi Beg, also known as Kechi Beg, is an archaeological site located in the Quetta Valley of Balochistan, Pakistan. The site can be traced back to 3800–3200 BCE, during the developed Neolithic era of the pre–Harappan Indus Valley Civilizations. Based on ceramics from the region that are on exhibit at the Central Asian Antiquities Museum in New Delhi, India, it was found by British archaeologist Stuart Piggott during his explorations in the region in 1943–1944. Killi Kechi Beg is one of several Chalcolithic period sites found in Balochistan dating back to 4500 to 1500 BCE.

== Excavation and finding ==
As part of the American Museum of Natural History's archaeological explorations to Balochistan in the early 1950s, American archaeologist Walter A. Fairservis excavated Killi Kechi Beg. After giving the site the code Q14, Fairservis dug an 8-by-3-meter trench that was 2.5 meters deep and reached virgin soil. The excavated area was reduced to 6.5 by 3 meters because of a partial disturbance of the trench caused by a later Muslim burial chamber. Fairservis's excavations uncovered a single cultural horizon or period, which he named the Kechi Beg culture after the site. This period corresponds with Period IV at the neighboring site of Kili Gul Muhammad.

== Culture ==
According to Naseer and Jan (2018), the Kechi Beg civilization is an advanced Chalcolithic (Copper Age) phase in the Balochistan cultural sequence. Kechi Beg I (KB I) and Kechi Beg II (KB II) are the site's two principal cultural stages. Cultural similarities between KB I and the Kili Gul Muhammad IV (KGM IV) phase indicate a close cultural and material relationship between the people living at these two locations. The Balochistan Tradition's Kechi Beg II (KB II) phase corresponds to the Regionalization era from 5500 to 3300 BCE.

With stone slab foundations and mud-brick walls for the top structures, Kechi Beg's architecture is very straightforward. This architectural style, which reflects the building materials and methods accessible at the time, is prevalent among the Chalcolithic sites in the area.

== Pottery ==
One unique aspect of the culture at Killi Kechi Beg is the pottery discovered. It is a part of the Quetta Culture, which includes other archaeological sites from Iranian Sistan and the Helmand Valley to the Baloch and Sarawan districts of Balochistan, and what Piggott called the "Buff-ware cultures" of Balochistan. Painted patterns reminiscent of the Amri ceramic decoration history define the Kechi Beg pottery style. Wide bands with geometric motifs like sigmas, hachures, cross-hatchings, and designs painted in black on a red or buff slip characterize the exquisite, well-decorated KB I ceramics. KB II is well known for its polychrome ceramics, which have striking color combinations and geometric patterns.

Kechi Beg pottery is one of the three primary pottery styles of the Balochistan Tradition, the other two being Quetta Ware and Nal Pottery. Black-on-buff slip, bichrome (black patterns and red bands painted on buff ware), and white-on-dark slip are characteristics of Kechi Beg Ware, also called Togau Ware. In the late fifth and early fourth millennia BCE, this ceramic style was commonly used throughout Balochistan.

== Regional significance ==
Killi Kechi Beg is part of the Kechi Beg complex, one of several cultural complexes that emerged around Balochistan during the second period of the developed Neolithic era. Evidence indicates that wheat replaced barley as the main crop in the Kechi Beg complex, which created a shift in subsistence patterns that may have been made possible by improvements in irrigation. There may be evidence of an irrigation canal from this era close to the Mehrgarh site.

Important insights into the material culture and trade networks of the pre-Harappan Indus Valley Civilizations can be gained from artifacts unearthed from Killi Kechi Beg and other sites within the Kechi Beg complex. A total of 670 artifacts from 112 sites have been attributed to the Kechi Beg complex. In the Quetta Valley alone, there are about twenty locations where Kechi Beg cultural artifacts have been discovered. These discoveries provide insight into the regionalization and expansion of village life in the Indus Valley region during the Developed Neolithic period, which paved the way for the emergence of the mature Harappan phase of the Indus Valley Civilization in the ensuing centuries, along with contemporaneous sites of the Hakra Ware and Anarta complexes.

== Chronology and interconnections ==
Understanding the interactions between the ancient cultures of Balochistan and the Indus Valley during the Chalcolithic period requires an awareness of the Kechi Beg painted pottery style. The Kechi Beg style pottery first appears in Period IV of the archaeological sequence at the Kili Ghul Mohammad site in the Quetta Valley. Period III included wheel-made pottery with black-on-red slip ornamentation that was probably from northern Iran. Kili Ghul Mohammad Period IV pottery in the Kechi Beg style subsequently develops into the polychrome painted Amri-like style found in Period I pottery at the neighboring site of Damb Sadaat.

Archaeologists can trace the historical sequence and evolution of pottery styles in this region during the 4th and 3rd millennia BCE because of the stratigraphic position of the Kechi Beg pottery style. According to Fairservis (1956), it shows the first obvious stylistic connections between the Quetta Valley's ceramic traditions and the Indus Valley's Amri culture.
