= Amri-Nal culture =

4th and 3rd millennia BC Pakistani culture

Amri–Nal
- Geographical range: Sindh and Balochistan, Pakistan
- Dates: 5000-3000 BCE
- Major sites: Amri, Sohr Damb area in Naal, Balochistan

Amri–Nal culture is attributed to archaeological sites in Sindh and Balochistan provinces of Pakistan. It flourished in the 4th and 3rd millennia BC. The dual typesites are Amri and Sohr Damb area in Naal, Balochistan.

== Location ==
Several settlements attributed to the Amri culture have been discovered, mainly in lower Sindh. They are often distributed along the terraces of old and active river courses and consist of sites of different size and shape, which are sometimes stratified below settlements of later periods. Among these, that of the Tharro Hills, near the town of Gujo (in Thatta district), is one of the most famous of lower Sindh.

== Cultural context ==
Kot Diji and Amri are close to each other in Sindh. They earlier developed indigenous culture which had common elements, later they came in contact with Harappan culture and fully developed into mature phase of Indus Valley Civilisation.

== Amri-Nal cultural artifacts ==
Amri-Nal culture: Based on the pottery found here, it is classified as a separate archaeological culture / subculture.

The Amri culture is a characteristic Chalcolithic cultural aspect of Lower Sindh. It does not exist in Balochistan and also in the Las Bela province where, in contrast, are known many sites of the Nal culture. Unfortunately both these two cultural aspects are very insufficiently radiocarbon dated, though we suggest that they flourished around the middle of the fourth millennium cal BC. Amri is a stratified mound located in Upper Sindh, along the right (western) bank of the Indus. The Amri sequence is quite thick here, suggesting that the site was settled for a few centuries.

The Amri culture fine ware is light buff with linear geometric motifs painted in dark brown and black, while the coarse one, though not so coarse at all, is slipped in red (see Casal 1964). The knapped stone assemblage is also very typical and does not find parallels in that of the following early Bronze Age Kot Diji aspect. It is characterised by a blade assemblage, with implements detached by pressute flaking, with semi-abrupt retouch. The most typical tool is a triangle retouched along three sides, otherwise called "Amri Triangle" (see Biagi 2005). There are many sites of this cultural aspect in Sindh. The late Professor A.R. Khan discovered many, that are systematically weathered and very often fortified, like the Tharro Hills or Kot Raja Manjera (see Khan 1979).

== See also ==
- Indus Valley civilization
- List of Indus Valley civilization sites
  - Bhirrana, 4 phases of IVC with earliest dated to 8th-7th millennium BCE
  - Harappa
  - Kalibanga, an IVC town and fort with several phases starting from Early harappan phase
  - Kunal, Haryana pre harappan cultural ancestor of Rehman Dheri
  - Mohenjo Daro
  - Rakhigarhi, one of the largest IVC city with 4 phases of IVC with earliest dated to 8th-7th millennium BCE
- List of inventions and discoveries of the Indus Valley civilization
  - Hydraulic engineering of the Indus Valley civilization
  - Sanitation of the Indus Valley civilisation
- Periodisation of the Indus Valley civilisation
- Pottery in the Indian subcontinent
