= Amri, Sindh =

Ancient settlement in Sindh province of Pakistan

Amri
- آمری (Urdu)
- Amri, Sindh
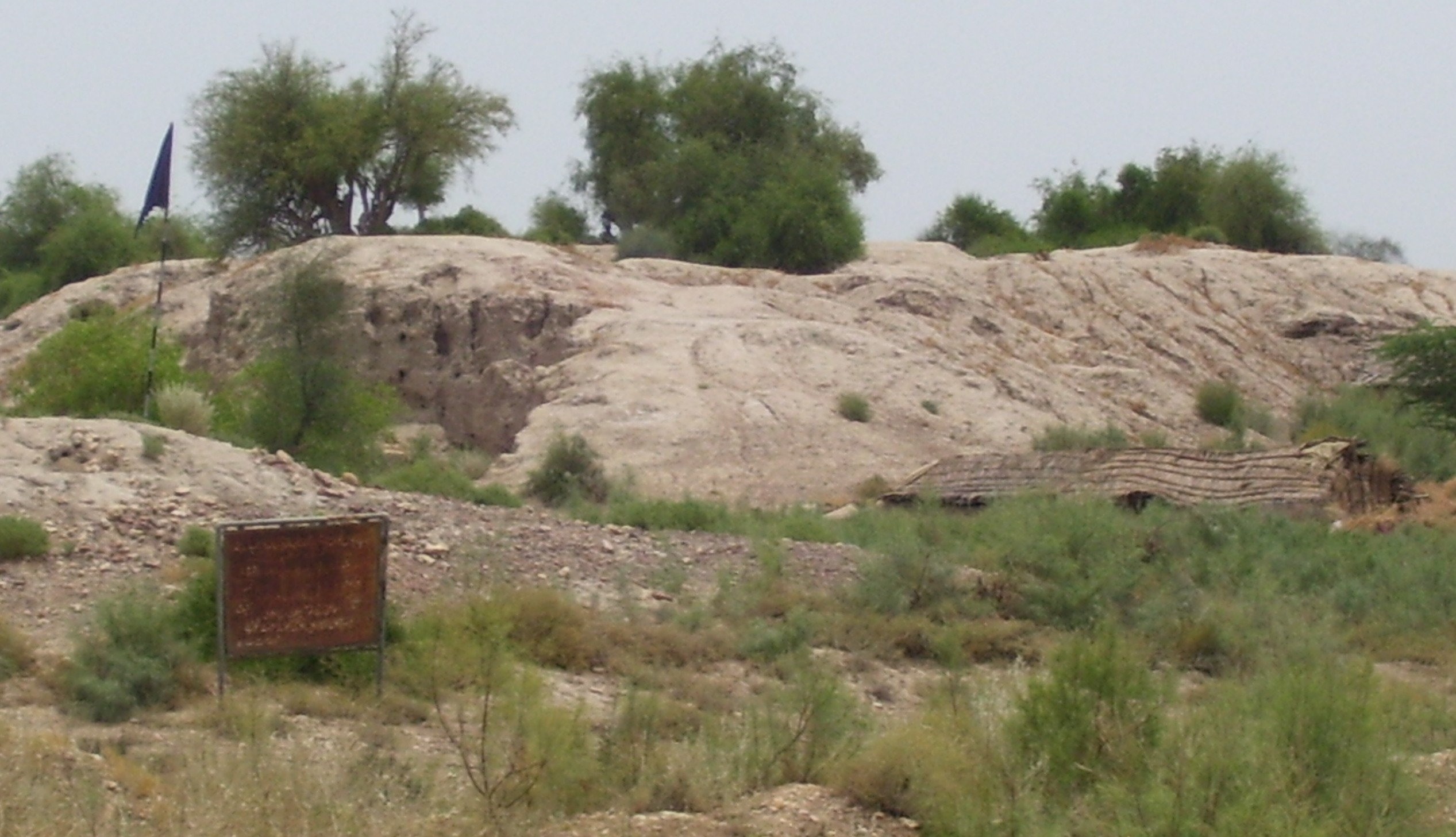
- A mound of Amri
- Interactive map of Amri
- 25°54′35″N 67°55′25″E
- Type: Ancient settlement
- Periods: Pre-Harappan, Indus Valley, Jhukar, Jhangar
- Location: Sindh, Pakistan

History
- Built: 3600 BC

Site notes
- Area: 8 ha (20 acres)
- Condition: Archaeological site

Amri is an ancient settlement in modern-day Sindh, Pakistan, that goes back to 3600 BCE. The site is located south of Mohenjo-daro on Hyderabad-Dadu Road more than 100 kilometres north of Hyderabad.

== Cultural context ==
Amri is a type site for Amri culture which developed in Sindh during 4th millennium BCE. Kot Diji and Amri are close to each other in Sindh, they earlier developed indigenous culture which had common elements, later they came in contact with Harappan culture and fully developed into mature phase of Indus Valley Civilisation.

== Archaeology ==
Prehistoric Amri-Nal culture is attributed to the dual typesites of Amri and Nal. This site had multi-level structures, although it was never a big city.

=== Pre-Harappan stage ===
Situated near the foothills of Kirthar Mountains, this was an important earlier urban center in Lower Sindh. Amri is close to Balochistan where development of earlier farming communities from 6000 BC to 4000 BC ultimately led to urbanization. The ancient mounds of 8 hectares on the west bank of Indus River have been extensively excavated. The earliest phase was a fortified town that flourished from 3600 to 3300 BC, and belonged to the Pre-Harappan stage of the Indus Valley civilization. Amri is dated after Rehman Dheri. The pottery discovered here had its own characteristics and is known as Amri Ware. Sohr Damb (Nal) is a related site in Balochistan to the west of Amri. Their pottery is sometimes collectively described as 'Amri-Nal ware'. Like other Pre Harappa towns, no writings were found at this site. Evidence indicates widespread fire at the town around 2500 BCE.

=== Later phases ===
- In period II (ca. 2750-2450 BC), more and more elements of Indus Valley culture appear.
- Period III (ca. 2450-1900 BC) belongs almost entirely to Indus Valley culture.
- Period IV (ca. 1900-1300 BC) is marked by the mingling of cultural traditions. Elements of the Jhukar culture appear, and co-exist with the last phase of the Indus Valley culture. Later, the elements of Jhangar culture appear.
- Period V is Muslim and dated much later.

Based on the evidence from this site, Indus culture was probably not developed directly from Amri culture. Also, at least at this location, rather than suddenly being replaced by the Amri culture, there was a co-existence of both cultures.

== See also ==
- List of Indus Valley Civilization sites
  - Bhirrana, 4 phases of IVC with earliest dated to 8th-7th millennium BCE
  - Harappa
  - Kalibanga, an IVC town and fort with several phases starting from Early harappan phase
- List of inventions and discoveries of the Indus Valley Civilization
  - Hydraulic engineering of the Indus Valley Civilization
  - Sanitation of the Indus Valley Civilisation
- Periodisation of the Indus Valley Civilisation
- Pottery in the Indian subcontinent
  - Black and red ware, belonging to Neolithic and Pre-Harappan phases
  - Kunal culture, subtype of Pre-Harappan Phase
  - Sothi-Siswal culture, subtype of Pre-Harappan Phase
  - Cemetery H culture (2000-1400 BC), early Indo-Aryan pottery at IVC sites later evolved into Painted Grey Ware culture of Vedic period
