= Sohr Damb =

Archaeological site in Pakistan

Coordinates: 27°41′20″N 66°18′30″E

Sohr Damb سُھر ڈَمب
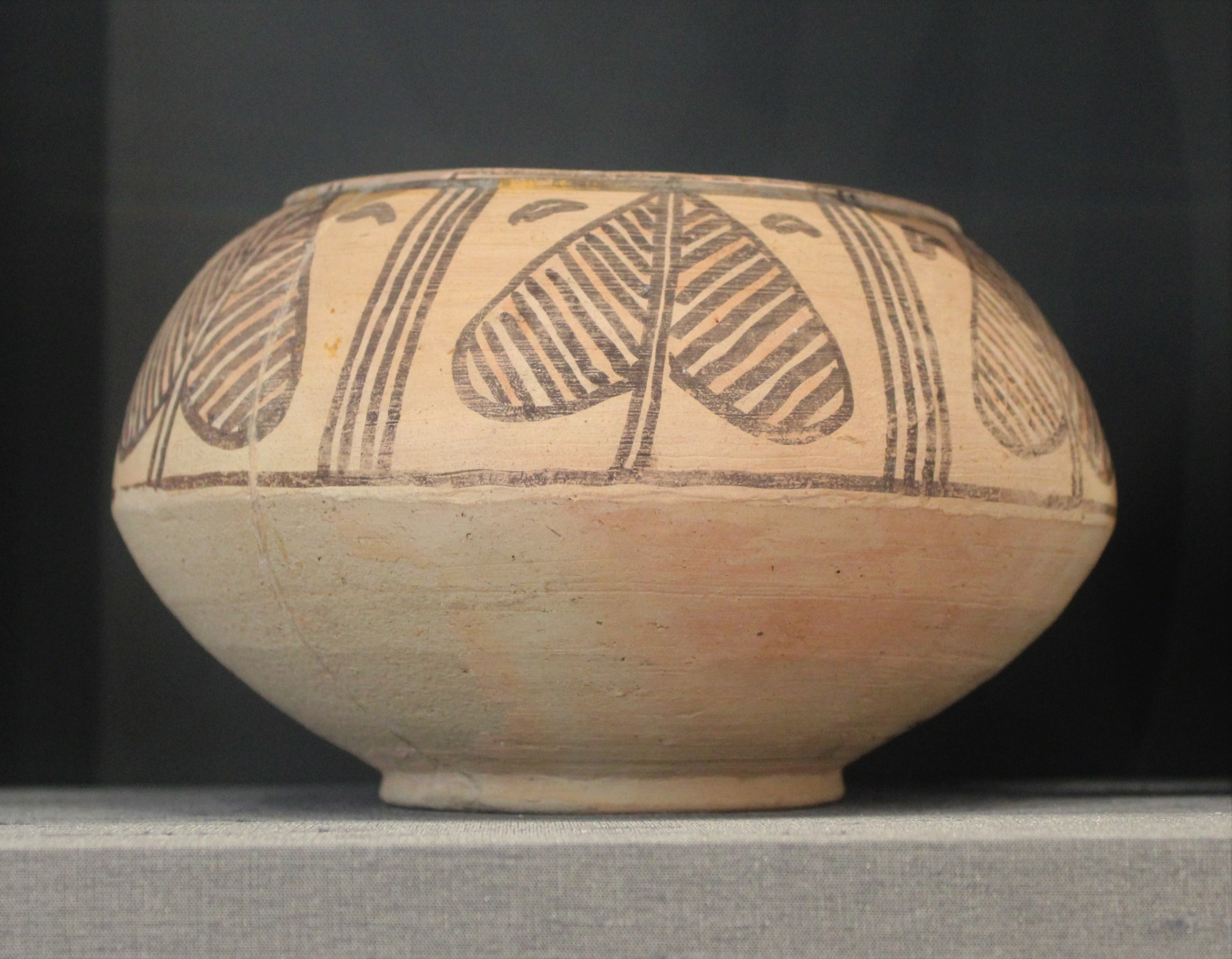
- Bowl decorated in brown paint on off-white. Nal pottery, Baluchistan. From Sohr Damb mound, Pakistan. 3rd millennium BC. British Museum, London
- Type: Archaeological site
- Periods: c. 3800–2300 BC
- Cultures: Amri-Nal culture
- Location: Near Nal, central Balochistan, Pakistan

Site notes
- Height: Mound is 13 meters high
- Length: Around 4.5 hectares
- Excavation dates: First discovered in 1903, systematic excavations since 2001 by the German Archaeological Institute and Department of Archaeology and Museums, Government of Pakistan

Sohr Damb ('Red Mound'), (Balochi: سُھر ڈَمب) c. 3800–2300 BC, is an archaeological site near Nal in central Balochistan, Pakistan that begins before the Indus Valley Civilization featuring Togau, Kili Ghul Mohammad, and Kechi Beg pottery styles. It has also been known as Naal, Balochistan, and gave its name to the prehistoric Amri-Nal culture, which is attributed to the dual typesites of Amri and Nal.

The site extends around 4,5 hectares; the mound (mostly geologically formed) is 13 m high. The cultural stratum is less than 2 m deep. The excavations reveal four periods of occupation, and they could be further divided into several sub-periods.

== Excavations ==
The locality was first discovered in 1903. In the following years, various minor excavations took place, including by Sir Aurel Stein. Another excavation was led by Harold Hargreaves in 1924. Since 2001, the site has been systematically excavated by the German Archaeological Institute and the Department of Archeology and Museums, Government of Pakistan.

== Findings ==
=== Periodisation ===
Amri-Nal culture: Based on the pottery found here, it is classified as a separate archaeological culture / subculture.

=== Period I ===
The oldest period (Period I) belongs to the cultural complexes called Togau, Kili Ghul Mohammad, and Kechi Beg, but new research is needed to establish the exact sequence of them, and until now, 16 skeletons were found in 11 burials, some of them located in small chambers. The grave goods included ceramics, pearls, and semi-precious stones like carnelian, agate, lapis lazuli, also steatite beads, shells with red pigment and grinding stones. In Tomb 739/ 740, more than 12 bodies and 60 complete pots were found. All chambers contain multiple fractional burials, deposited some time after death. The pottery belongs to different cultural styles, such as Togau A–D, Kili Ghul Mohammad, and Kechi Beg, which were previously believed to represent development through time. The assemblage is comparable to Mehrgarh III–IV and Shahi Tump in Makran, but the differences in burial customs and grave goods are pronounced. Some parallels can also be drawn to the Sialk III horizon in Iran, so a date between 4000/3800 and 3200 BC is proposed.

=== Period II ===
During Period II, we see the appearance of the Nal culture complex. The dead were now buried in individual graves. There are only a few vessels offered as grave goods. The excavated mud-brick houses are usually small. There was a lot of utility ceramics, but also some brightly painted ceramics typical of the Nal culture. There were also millstones, bone implements, and pearls. The settlement reached its present size of 4.5 ha. The Togau pottery, which was so common in Period I, was no longer produced and was replaced by the typical Nal pottery which is buff and carries complex geometric and figurative motifs painted in black, and often with turquoise, yellow, and red as additional colors. The calibrated dates are between 3100 BC and 2700 BC.

=== Period III ===
Period III is closely related to the other cultures of the area, such as Mehrgarh, and Mundigak in Afghanistan. The mud-brick architecture has now become larger; copper makes its appearance, while the ceramics become simpler. Copper and ceramics were probably processed/produced on site. The calibrated results for Period III are from ca. 2700 to 2500/2400 BC, leaving no doubt that the terminal date of Period III is not much later than ca. 2400 BC. From this period onwards, and throughout the borderlands, Mundigak IV reached its largest size, Shahr-i Sokhta (II–III) grew into an urban center with monumental architecture, and in the Indus Valley, after 2600 BC, a centralized state took shape that gradually expanded over a huge area

=== Period IV ===
The Period IV layers are badly eroded. Overall, this period belongs to the Kulli culture, as well as the Indus culture. Period IV occupation is very eroded and only attested at the surface, often just by gravel foundations. The pottery resembles so-called Kulli-Harappan types, and combines features of the indigenous Kulli complex with those of the Indus civilization and reflects the westerly expansion into the Kulli domain of this civilization, the calibrated dating results of the few samples available from Period IV fall to between 2500 and 2300 BC.

=== Agriculture ===
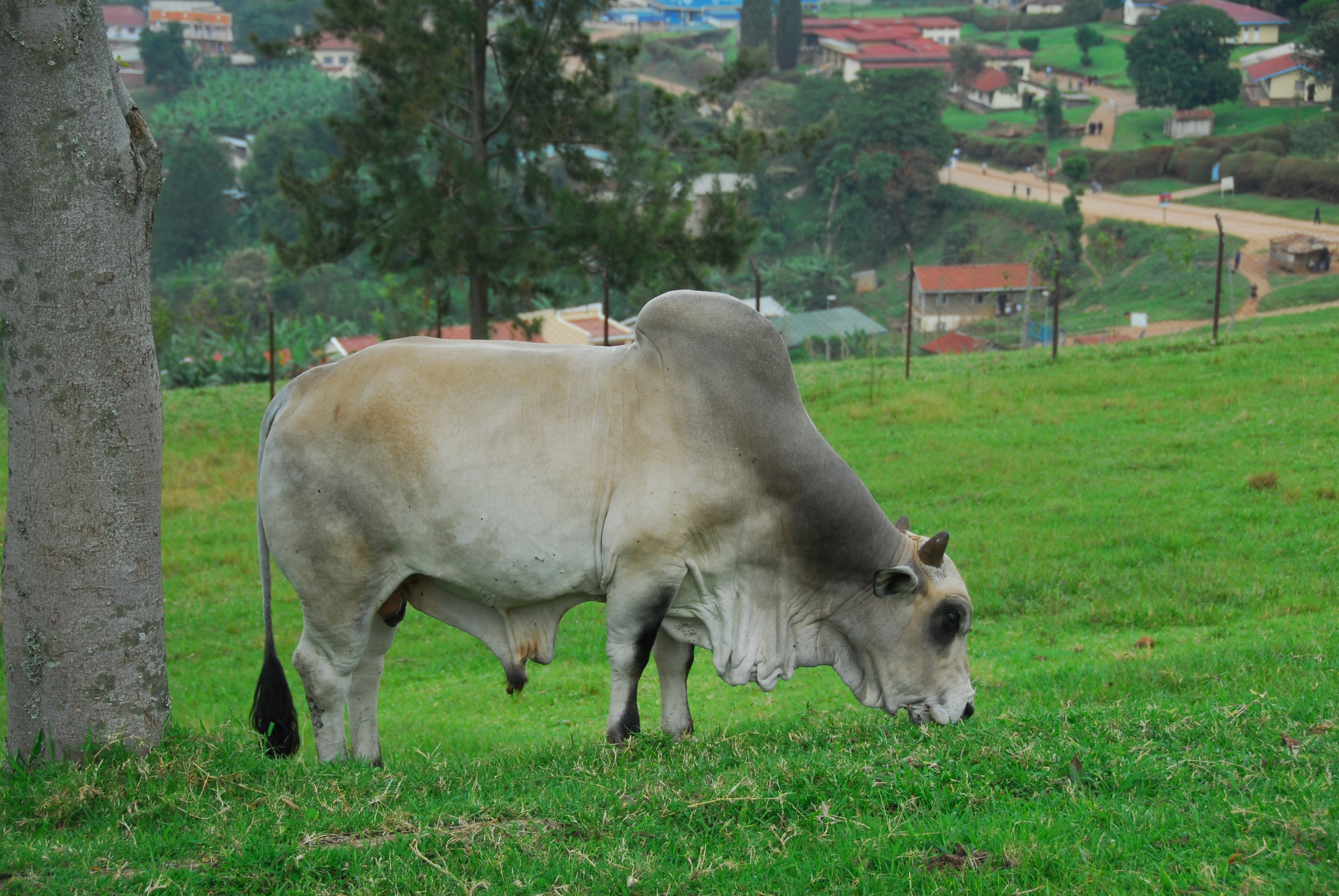
Humped Zebu cattle – originally domesticated in Balochistan

Domesticated cattle bones are plentiful in the settlement, and bull figurines are also found. The bones were identified as coming from humped or Zebu cattle.

Sheep and goats were also kept. The inhabitants also had dogs. Wild mammals account for only 5% of the bone remains.

Crops like wheat, and hulled and naked barley were used from the earliest period. Later, the crops indigenous to the Indian subcontinent, like sesame, and millet became more popular.

The sesame sample from Period III is the oldest, stratified record from this crop until now.

Both wild and cultivated fruits were exploited. Fig, jujube, dwarf palm and grape vine were quite popular.

=== Sohr Damb in context ===
Sohr Damb/Nal is stratigraphically earlier than the Kulli culture phase. Also, at Surab, Nal occupations are later than the Kili Gul Mohammad phase.

In the past, the Nal cemetery was understood as belonging to the Kulli Culture. But more recently, Nal is rather understood as belonging to its own pottery tradition, linked more to Baluchistan.

Sohr Damb ceramics, wheel-turned, and with polychrome decoration, shows some parallels with Mundigak period III1-6.

There's some controversy about the absolute chronological framework of the transition from Period II to III at Nal. This transition has a bearing on the chronology of both Shahr-e Sokhta, and of the Indus civilization. The transition can be dated either to the mid-3rd millennium, or to the late 3rd millennium BC.

Early Nal has an affinity with Amri, Sindh. Their pottery is quite similar.

Kulli-Mehi culture is in some ways a continuation of Nal.

== See also ==
- Indus Valley Civilization
- List of Indus Valley Civilization sites
  - Bhirrana, 4 phases of IVC with earliest dated to 8th–7th millennium BCE
  - Harappa
  - Kalibanga, an IVC town and fort with several phases starting from Early harappan phase
  - Kunal, Haryana pre harappan cultural ancestor of Rehman Dheri
  - Mohenjo Daro
  - Nindowari
  - Rakhigarhi, one of the largest IVC city with 4 phases of IVC with earliest dated to 8th–7th millennium BCE
- List of inventions and discoveries of the Indus Valley Civilization
  - Hydraulic engineering of the Indus Valley Civilization
  - Sanitation of the Indus Valley civilisation
- Periodisation of the Indus Valley Civilisation
- Pottery in the Indian subcontinent
  - Bara culture, subtype of Late-Harappan Phase
  - Black and red ware, belonging to Neolithic and Pre-Harappan phases
  - Kunal culture, subtype of Pre-Harappan Phase
  - Sothi-Siswal culture, subtype of Pre-Harappan Phase
  - Cemetery H culture (2000–1400 BC), early Indo-Aryan pottery at IVC sites later evolved into Painted Grey Ware culture of Vedic period
