= Damb Sadat =

Type of archaeological mound

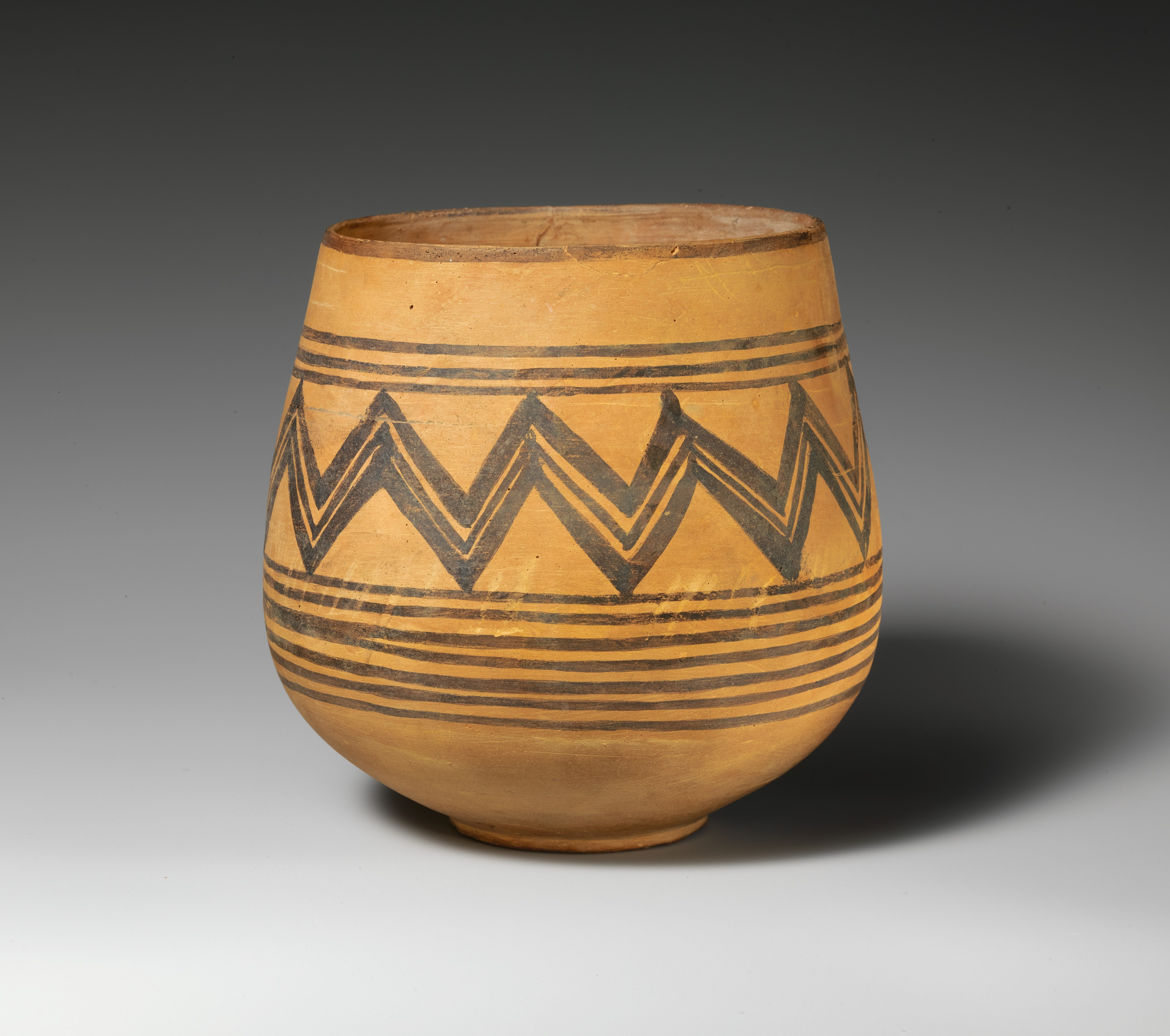
- Bowl with painted decoration from Damb Sadat. Early to mid-3rd millennium BC. Metropolitan Museum of Art
- Type: Archaeological mound and ancient settlement
- Periods: 3500 BCE
- Cultures: Damb Sadat culture
- Location: Baluchistan region, Pakistan

Damb Sadat culture sites (marked with black crosses) amidst contemporary cultures

Damb Sadat (also Damb Sadaat, Damb Saadat) is an archaeological mound and ancient settlement in the Baluchistan region of Pakistan.

Damb Sadat is related to the early phases of the Indus Valley Civilisation, and dates to 3500 BCE; it is located in Quetta Valley, which is a rich agricultural environment, and was home to several earlier Neolithic cultures.

== Damb Sadat culture ==
Based on the pottery found here, Damb Sadat culture is classified as a separate archaeological culture / subculture.

Quetta pottery (black-on-buff type) is the general term for the ceramic tradition in the valley. Damb Sadat pottery comes as a part of this tradition. It dates to the middle and last half of the third millennium B.C.

This pottery is also found at Said Qala Tepe, Deh Morasi Ghundai, Mundigak periods III–IV, and Shahr-i Sokhta periods I–III, all of which date to the last half of the third millennium B.C.

=== Cultural sites ===
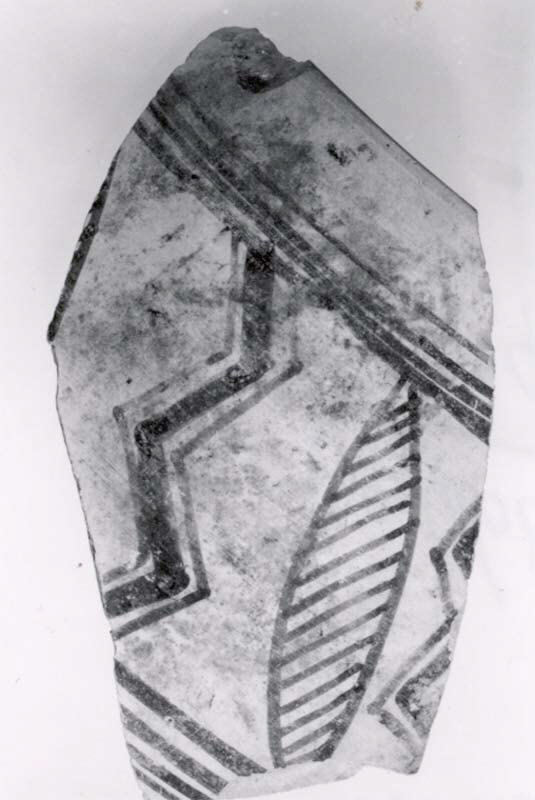
Decoration of Damb Sadat ceramic. Early to mid-3rd millennium B.C. Metropolitan Museum of Art

There are multiple settlements of this culture in Pakistan and in Iran.

Gregory Possehl sees Mundigak, in the Helmand River basin of Afghanistan, as part of the Damb Sadat Phase of Central Baluchistan, dated to 4500-2000 BCE.

"Contemporary with the Kot Diji and Amri-Nal Phases is a smaller, more localized cultural phase of the early Harappan, centered on the Quetta Valley. ... This valley is also the center of a natural corridor linking southern Afghanistan to the Indus Valley via the Bolan and Khojak Passes.

According to him, there are thirty-seven Dumb Sadat sites averaging 2.64 hectares. The largest of them is the Quetta Miri (23 hectares).

=== Periodisation ===
The first habitation period of Damb Sadat (Damb Sadat I) coincided with the last of Kili Ghul Mohammad. Kechi Beg pottery has been found in both sites.

This earliest phase of Damb Sadat lasted from 3500 to 2600 BC, with settlements remaining small but growing in number. It was related also to Kot Diji culture and Sothi-Siswal culture.

During Damb Sadat II period, multi-room dwellings were built of mudbrick with limestone foundations. The radiocarbon dates for this period is about 3000 BC.

Faiz Mohammed gray pottery comes after Damb Sadat pottery.

== See also ==
- Periodisation of the Indus Valley Civilisation
