= Tharro Hills =

The Tharro Hills are located in Thatta district, Sindh, Pakistan. Important archaeological sites relating to the Amri culture have been discovered in the area.
