= Kot Diji =

Archeological site that predates the Indus Civilization

- ڪوٽ ڏیجي (Sindhi) کوٹ ڈیجی (Urdu)
- Location within Sindh Location within Pakistan
- 27°20′44″N 68°42′24″E
- Type: Settlement
- Periods: Harappan 1 to Harappan 2
- Cultures: Indus Valley civilisation
- Location: Khairpur District, Sindh, Pakistan

Site notes
- Excavation dates: 1955, 1957

Kot Diji (Sindhi: ڪوٽ ڏیجي; Urdu: کوٹ ڈیجی, IPA: [koːʈ ɖiːdʒiː]) is an ancient site which was part of the Indus Valley Civilisation, estimated to have been occupied around 3300 BCE. Located about 45 km (28 mi) south of Khairpur in the modern-day province of Sindh, Pakistan, it is on the east bank of the Indus River opposite Mohenjo-daro. The remains consist of two parts: the citadel area on the high ground (about 12 m [39 ft]), and the area around it. The Pakistan Department of Archaeology excavated at Kot Diji in 1955 and 1957. The excavation at Kot Diji during 1954-55 by F. A. Khan revealed convincing evidence of the early or formative stage of the Indus civilisation in the cultural assemblage called Kot Dijian.

The site is situated at the foot of the Rohri Hills, where Kot Diji Fort was built around 1790 by the Talpur dynasty ruler of Upper Sindh, Mir Suhrab, who reigned from 1783 to 1830 AD. This fort, built on the ridge of a steep narrow hill, is well-preserved.

== Cultural context ==
Kot Diji is the type site, i.e. the first excavated site of this type of culture, for the Kot Diji Culture which belongs to the Early Harappan Phase of the Indus Valley Civilisation, c.3300-2800 BCE. Rehman Dheri (near Dera Ismail Khan in Khyber Pakhtunkhwa province), has generally been considered the oldest example of this culture. Kunal (in Haryana) was excavated and found to be another old site with similar cultural artifacts.

Kot Diji and Amri, located near each other in Sindh, initially developed indigenous cultures with shared elements. Later, these cultures came into contact with the Harappan culture and evolved into the Mature Harappan culture. The earliest examples of artifacts belonging to this culture were found at Rehman Dheri and Kunal, which are cultural ancestors to the site at Harappa. These sites have pre-Harappan indigenous cultural levels, distinct from the culture of Harappa, at Banawali (level I), Kot Diji (level 3A), and Amri (level II). Rehman Dheri also has a pre Kot Diji phase (RHD1 3300-28 BCE) which is not part of the IVC culture. Kot Diji has two later phases that continue into and alongside Mature Harappan Phase (RHDII and RHDII 2500-2100 BCE). Fortified towns found here are dated as follows.

- Kot Diji (3300 BCE), is the type site, located in Sindh in Pakistan.
- Amri (3600–3300 BCE), also has non-Harappan phases dating 6000 BC to 4000 BC, and later Harappan Phases till 1300 BCE.
- Kalibangan (3500 BC – 2500 BC), in northwest Rajasthan in India on Ghaggar River.
- Rehman Dheri, 3300 BCE, near Dera Ismail Khan and close to River Zhob Valleyin Khyber Pakhtunkhwa in Pakistan.
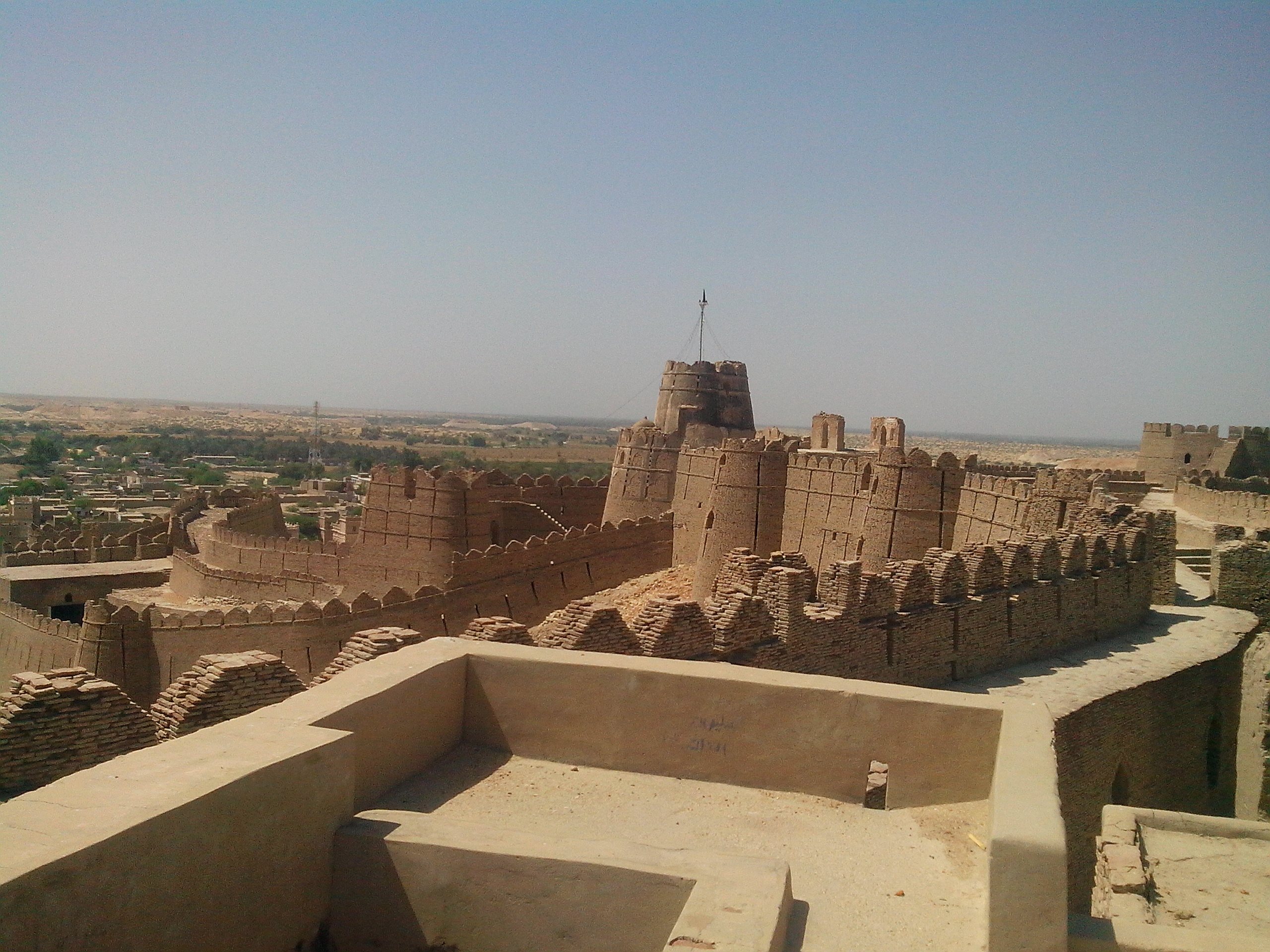
  Kot Diji fort top
- Kunal in Hisar district of Haryana in India has a similar culture to the Pre-Harappan site of Rehman Dheri. A button seal was discovered at Kunal during the 1998-99 excavations by Archaeological Survey of India. The seal is similar to the Rehman Dheri examples. It contained a picture of two deer on one side, and a geometrical pattern on other side.

== Kot Diji culture (3300–2600 BCE) ==
Kot Diji culture': Based on the pottery found here, it is classified as a separate archaeological culture / subculture.

The site covers 2.6 hectares (6.4 acres). The earliest occupation of this site is termed 'Kot Dijian', which is pre-Harappan, or early formative Harappan.

At the earliest layer, Kot Diji I (2605 BC), copper and bronze were not used. The houses and fortifications were made from unbaked mud-bricks. Lithic material, such as leaf-shaped chert arrowheads, shows parallels with Mundigak layers II-IV. The pottery seems to anticipate Harappan Ware. Later, bronze was used, but only for personal ornaments. Also, use of the potters wheel was already in evidence.

The Early Harappan phase construction consists of two clearly defined areas. There is a citadel on high ground for the elites separated by a defensive wall with bastions at regular intervals. This area measures about 500 by 350 feet (150 m × 110 m). The outer area, or the city proper, consisted of houses of mud bricks on stone foundations.

Pottery found from this site has designs with horizontal and wavy lines, or loops and simple triangular patterns. Other objects found are pots, pans, storage jars, toy carts, balls, bangles, beads, terracotta figurines of mother goddess and animals, bronze arrowheads, and well-fashioned stone implements. A particularly interesting find at Kot Diji is a toy cart, which shows that the potter's wheel permitted the use of wheels for bullock carts. The Kot Diji ceramic style is usually identified by wheel-thrown globular jars of red ware with everted or flanged rims and with geometric decorations including fish-scale patterns and itersecting circles, as well as depictions of bulls' heads, fish and pipal leaves (a type of Indian fig).

=== Progress towards Harappa Phase ===
Glazed steatite beads were produced. There was a clear transition from the earlier Ravi pottery to what is commonly referred to as Kot Diji pottery. Red slip and black painted designs replaced polychrome decorations of the Ravi Phase. Then, there was a gradual transformation into what is commonly referred to as Harappa Phase pottery.

Early Indus script may have appeared at Kot Diji on pottery and on a sealing. The use of inscribed seals and the standardization of weights may have occurred during the Kot Diji period.

Late Kot-Diji type pots were found as far as Burzahom in Jammu and Kashmir.

=== Massive burning ===
There are obvious signs of extensive burns over the entire site, including both the lower habitation area and the high mound (the fortified town), which were also observed at other Early Harappan sites: Period III at Gumla, Period II at Amri, Period I at Naushero. Signs of cleavage were observed at Early Harappan phase Period I at Kalibangan. The cause of the disruptions and/or abandonment of these sites toward the end of the Early Harappan phase remains unexplained.

== Rani Kot (600-1843 AD) ==
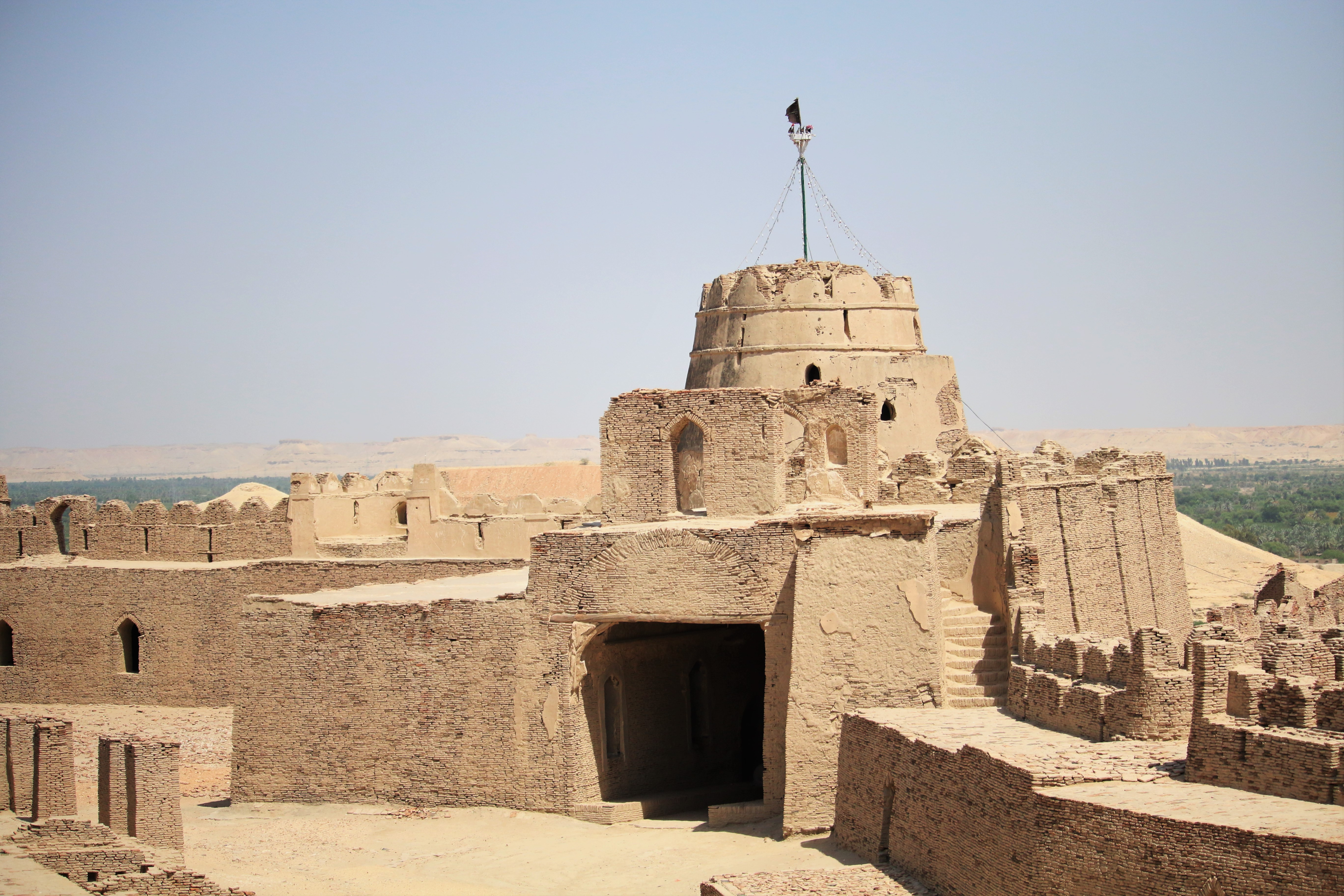
Fort of Rani Kot

According to legends, the wall existed during Umayyad rule and later under the Abbasid rule. The Soomro tribe inhabited the fort and later the Samma tribe positioned large infantry formations inside the fort.

The Mughal Emirs armed the walls of the fort with cannons and muskets. They were the first to renovate the entire structure. The Kalhora tribe later gained control of the fort, and finally the Talpurs saw the fort as a strategic asset especially during the reign of Mir Fatih Ali Khan Talpur, until they were defeated and overthrown by the British Empire, in 1843 AD.

The first radiocarbon date from charcoal included in the mortar of a collapsed pillar lying overturned in the riverbed at Sann (Eastern) Gate, Ranikot, confirms that at least this sector of the fort was built, or repaired, between the beginning of the 18th century and the beginning of 19th century, that is between the beginning of the Kalhoras and the beginning of the Talpurs rule. The present note, without positively solving the much debated issue of the age of the fort, points to a new line of research on the topic, which deserves future work, in order to collect more organic material for absolute dating. An Acacia charcoal sample collected from the above exposed surface was sent to Groningen Radiocarbon Laboratory (NL) for AMS dating. It yielded the following result 160±30 uncal BP (GrA-44671). Although its calibration is rather problematic, given that the curve at this point is highly fluctuating with several interceptions, most probabilities indicate that the pillar was erected between cal AD 1720 and 1828 (47.6% at 2 sigmas, according to OxCal 4.10: BRONK RAMSEY, 2009), although another interception suggests a much more recent date (fig.6).

== See also ==
- Sothi
- Indus Valley Civilization
- List of Indus Valley Civilization sites
- List of inventions and discoveries of the Indus Valley Civilization
- Hydraulic engineering of the Indus Valley Civilization

== Bibliography ==
- P. Biagi and E. Starnini 2021 - Indus Civilization. In Smith, C. (ed.) Encyclopedia of Global Archaeology. Springer Nature, Switzerland: 1-26. https://doi.org/10.1007/978-3-319-51726-1_3491-1
- Khan, F. A. 2002. The Glory that was Kot Diji Culture of Pakistan. An Archaeological Outline. Khairpur, Shah Abdul Latif University, Department of Archaeology.
- Occomano C. 1995 - Kot Dihi: stratigraphic and micromorphological features of the west section of the citadel area. Ancient Sindh, 2: 85–92.
- Madella M. 1995 - A preliminary study of phytolith analysis, agriculture and use of plants at Kot Diji (Sindh-Pakistan). Ancient Sindh, 2: 93–108.
