= Kulli culture =

Prehistoric culture in southern Balochistan (ca. 2500 - 2000 BCE)

Kulli
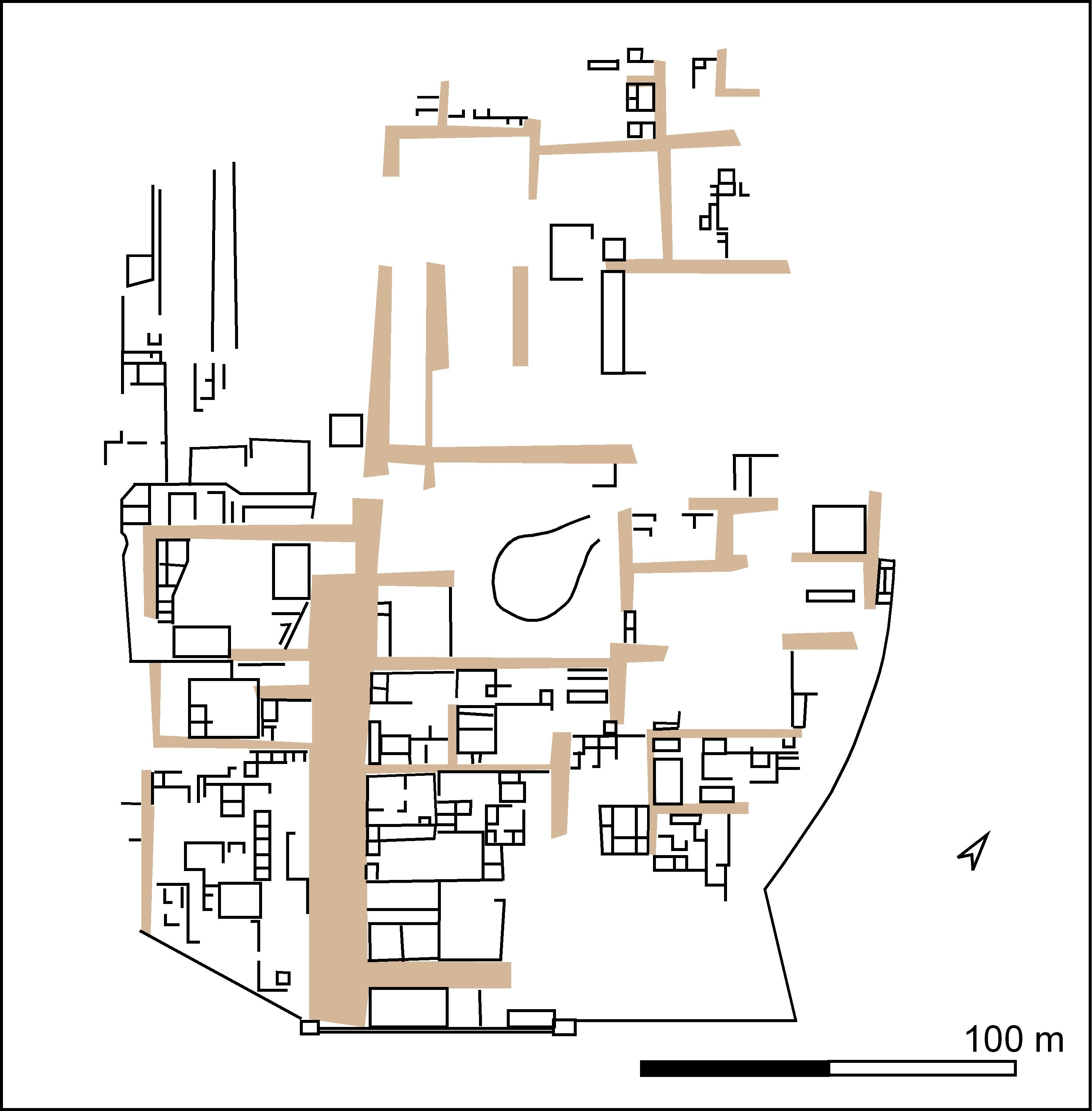
- Plan of the Kulli settlement Kasota Qila Mound II
- Geographical range: Balochistan (Gedrosia) in Pakistan
- Dates: ca. 2500 - 2000 BCE
- Major sites: Nindowari

The Kulli culture was a prehistoric culture in southern Balochistan (Gedrosia) in Pakistan ca. 2500 - 2000 BCE.

== Settlements ==
More than 100 settlement sites are known but very few are excavated. Some of them have the size of small towns and are similar to those of the Indus Valley civilization. The houses are built of local stone along streets. The latter are sometimes paved. There are stairs on the street for getting access to higher levels. The settlements are often placed at important strategic positions on small hills overlooking the surrounding country side. Most settlements are close to dams. Murda Sang is one town, about 35 ha big. The latest occupation level belongs to the Kulli culture.

Nindowari is an important settlement of the Kulli culture.

Kulli culture ware is also found in the latest stratum of Sohr Damb (Nal), so, in the past, Sohr Damb was understood as belonging to the Kulli culture. But more recently, this site is rather seen as mostly belonging to its own, earlier, pottery tradition (also known as 'Nal pottery'), linked more to Baluchistan.

== Economy ==
Agriculture was the economical base of this people. Several Kulli culture sites dams were found, providing evidence for a highly developed water management system.

== Material culture ==
Kulli culture: Based on the pottery found here, it is classified as a separate archaeological culture / subculture.

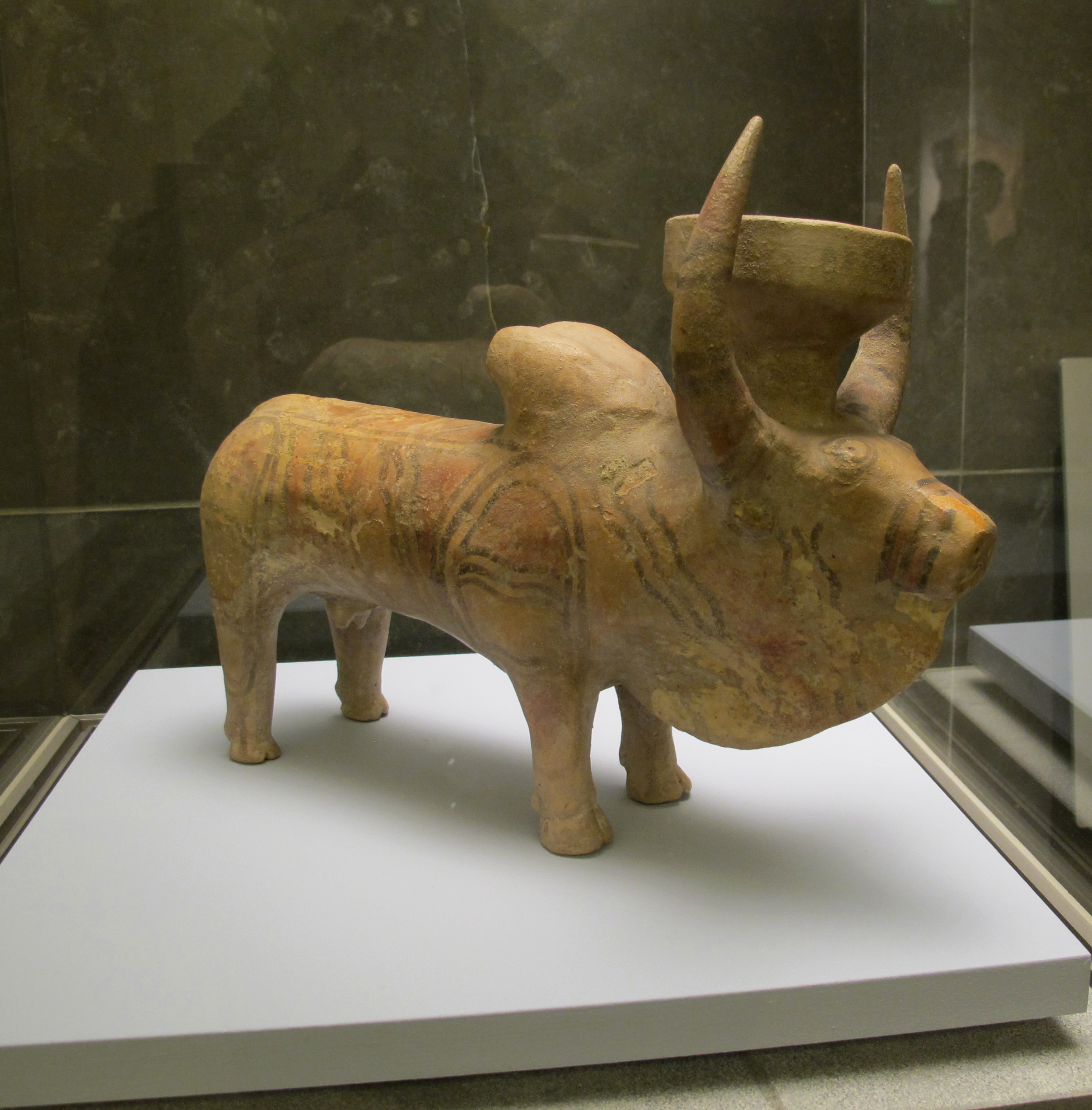
Rhyton (drinking vessel), zebu shaped. Painted terracotta. Pakistan, Nindowari site, 2300-2000 BCE, Kulli culture, the time of the Indus civilization. Guimet Museum, Paris.

The pottery of the Kulli culture shows different forms. There are globular beakers, small flasks, tall vases, cups and dishes. Large storage jars are sometimes painted. The only types in common with the Indus Valley Civilization are dishes on a stand and perforated vessels. Kulli culture pottery bears sometimes a painted decoration. The paintings are arranged in horizontal bands over the vessels. There are geometrical patterns and sometimes bands with figures of animals with plants. A popular motif is the zebu-bull. The figures appear highly stylised. The paint used is always black on the red surface of the vessels. This is similar to the decorated pottery of the Indus Valley Civilization, although the red of the Kulli pottery appears brighter. Other typical Kulli culture objects are rough clay figurines of zebu bulls and women. The women figurines are again highly stylized but show elaborate hair styles and many personal ornaments, such as necklaces and bangles. The bull figures are often painted. There were also found clay carts for the bulls. At Mehi were found several decorated chlorite vessels, imported from Tepe Yahya and attesting trade contacts with the Eastern Iran. Copper and bronze was known.

== See also ==
- Indus Valley civilization
- Gedrosia
- Nindowari

== Bibliography ==
- Possehl, Gregory L. (1986) Kulli: An exploration of ancient civilization in South Asia. Carolina Academic Press, Durham, North Carolina. ISBN 0-89089-173-7
- Stuart Piggott: Prehistoric India to 1000 B. C., Harmondsworth 1961 (3rd reprint), 98-114

== External links and references ==
- 2005 article by Feiyan Zhou Kulli culture as trading partners of the Indus Valley civilization
- on the Kulli culture on Harappa.com (essay no. 6)
