= Nindowari =

Archaeological site

- نندو ڈَمب (Urdu)
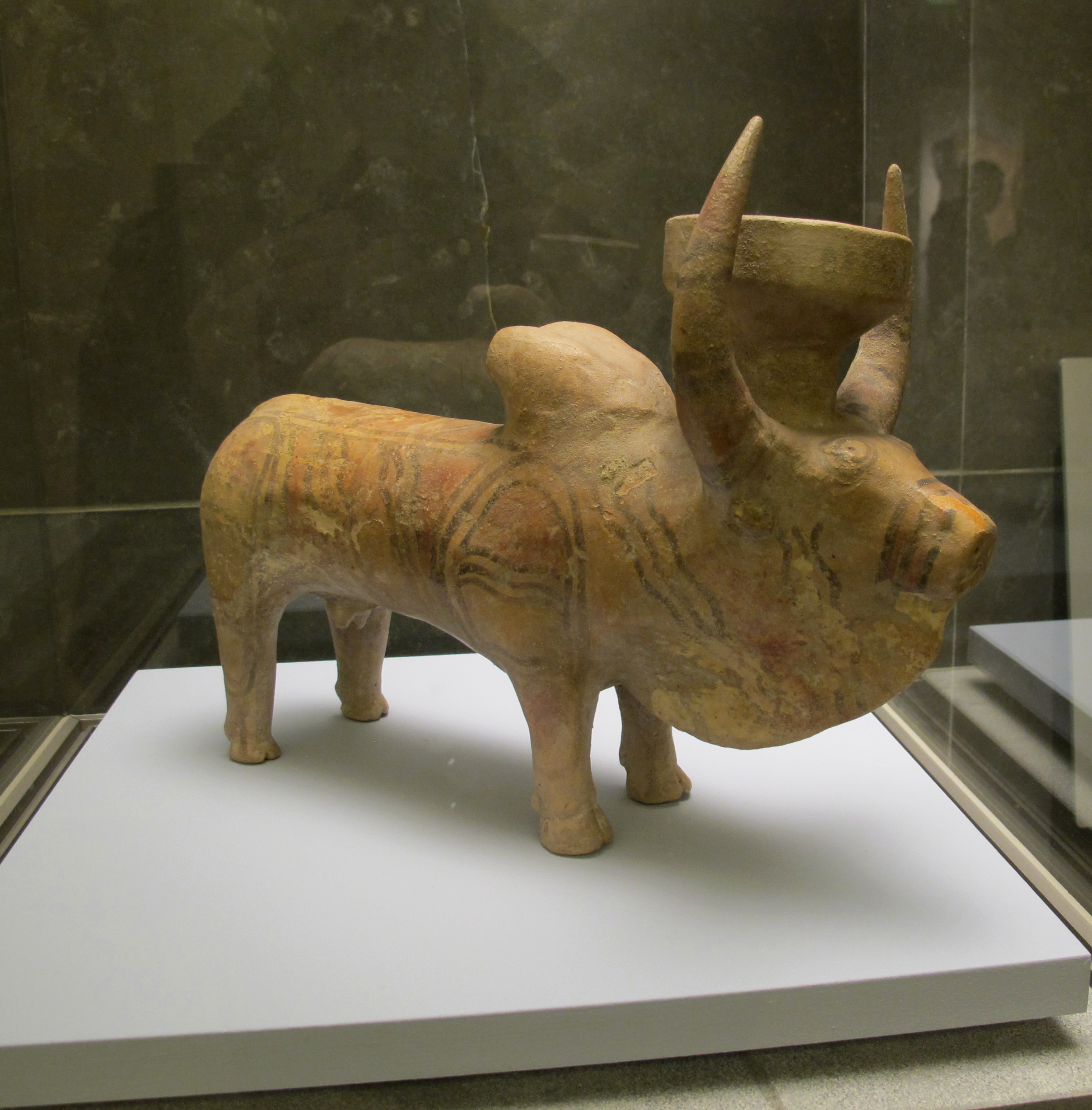
- Rhyton (drinking vessel), zebu shaped. Painted terracotta. Pakistan, Nindowari site, 2300-2000 BCE, Kulli culture, the time of the Indus civilization. Guimet Museum, Paris.
- 27.221°N 66.793°E
- Type: Archaeological site
- Location: Ornach Valley, Wadh Tehsil, Khuzdar District, Balochistan, Pakistan
- Region: Indus Valley Civilization

History
- Built: Chalcolithic period

Site notes
- Height: 75 ft (23 m)
- Area: 124 acres (50 ha)
- Excavation dates: 1962–1965
- Condition: Ruins
- Owner: Federal Government of Pakistan

Nindowari (Balochi: نندو ڈَمب, Urdu: نندارہ) also known as Nindo Damb, is an archaeological site associated with the Kulli culture, dating back to Chalcolithic period. It is located in the Khuzdar District of Balochistan, Pakistan, approximately 240 kilometres (150 mi) northwest of Karachi. The site lies on the right bank of the Kud River, a tributary of the Porali River. Excavations at Nindowari indicate that the area was initially inhabited by the Harappans, with subsequent occupation by the Kulli civilisation. Archaeological evidence suggests that the Kulli culture may have developed as a regional variant or offshoot of the Harappan civilisation, reflecting cultural continuity and interaction between these prehistoric societies.

== History ==
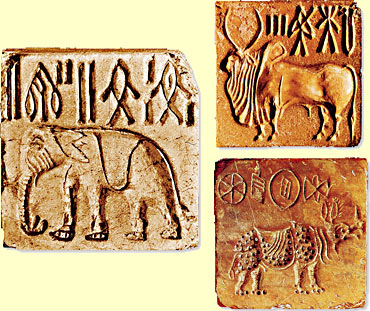
Nal ware and terracotta figurines with drawings of bulls (similar to the seals above) showed that Nindowari was once occupied by the Harappans

Nindowari is a site of the prehistoric Kulli culture of Balochistan with links to the Harappan Civilization. The site, spread over an area of 124 acres and 75 feet (23 m) high, is the largest Kulli complex site discovered so far. The settlement was built on a flat schist bed with a central quadrangular platform which was surrounded by buildings on one side. Mounds of various heights were located in the area. The central mound near the platform rose to a height of 82 feet (25 m) and consisted of large stones and boulders. The summit of the mound was accessed via a staircase from the platform showing this mound was considered a monument. Another mound, called Kulliki-an Damb (Mound of Potteries), was located 590 feet (180 m) south of the main mound. The site offers evidence that Kulli culture might be strongly associated with the Harappan Civilization if not directly derived from it. Artifacts excavated from the site show that the two cultures had close interaction.

The site was probably abandoned due to a major uplift which resulted in cutting off of the water source from the Kud River.

== Excavations ==
The site was discovered by Beatrice De Cardi in 1957. French Archaeological Mission, led by Jean-Marie Casal, and Department of Archaeology, Pakistan later carried out the Nindowari excavations from 1962 till 1965, uncovering traces of a Kulli settlement dating back to the third millennium BC. These excavations unearthed Kulli-Harappan pottery and vases with animal figures, mostly bulls and birds. Terracotta figurines of women adorned with jewelry with elaborate details were also discovered. Nal ware (old pottery from Indus Civilization) excavated from the site suggested a pre-Kulli occupation and that the Harrapans were settled in the area in early periods (3200 - 2500 BC).

== Status ==
Nindowari is one of the 27 notified Archaeological Sites and Monuments in Balochistan and protected by the Federal Government under the Federal Antiquities Act.
