= Great Bath =

Structure at the ruins of Mohenjo-daro in Pakistan

Coordinates: 27°19′31.29″N 68°7′58.34″E

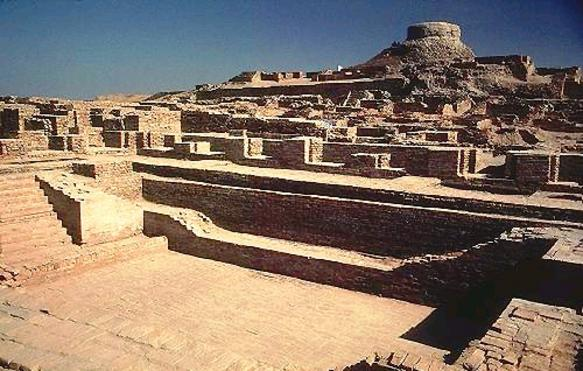
The Great Bath was found in 1926 during archaeological excavations

The Great Bath is one of the best-known structures among the ruins of the Harappan Civilization, excavated at Mohenjo-daro in present-day Sindh province of Pakistan. Archaeological evidence indicates that the Great Bath was built in the third millennium BCE, soon after the raising of the "citadel" mound on which it is located.

== Features ==
The Great Bath of Mohenjo-Daro is called the "earliest public water tank of the ancient world". It measures approximately 12 metres (40 ft) by 7 metres (23 ft), with a maximum depth of 2.4 metres (8 ft). Two wide staircases, one from the north and one from the south, served as the entry to the structure. A ledge 1.4 metres (4 ft 7 in) high extending the entire width of the bath is at the lower ends of these stairs. The sloping floor leads to a small outlet at the southwestern corner of the tank, connecting corbelled arch drain, which led the used water out of the bath.

The floor of the tank was watertight due to finely fitted bricks laid on edge with a gypsum plaster, and the side walls were constructed in a similar manner. To make the tank even more watertight, a thick layer of bitumen (waterproof tar) was laid along the sides of the pool and presumably also on the floor. Brick colonnades were discovered on the eastern, northern and southern edges. The preserved columns had stepped edges that may have held wooden screens or window frames. Two large doors lead into the complex from the south and other access was from the north and east. A series of rooms were located along the eastern edge of the building and in one room was a well that may have supplied some of the water needed to fill the tank. Rainwater also may have been collected for the purpose, but no inlet drains have been found. It may have had a long bathing pool built with waterproof bricks.

"Most scholars agree that this tank would have been used for special religious functions where water was used to purify and renew the well being of the bathers. This indicates the importance attached to ceremonial bathing in sacred tanks, pools and rivers since time immemorial." J. M. Kenoyer

The fresh water supply at Mohenjo-Daro was fed by a system of wells that were lined with wedge-shaped bricks.

=== College of Priests ===
Across the street of The Great Bath, there was a large building with several rooms and three verandas, and two staircases leading to the roof and upper floor. Considering the size of the Great Bath, this building is tentatively termed as the House of Priests and labelled as "College of Priests".

== Gallery ==
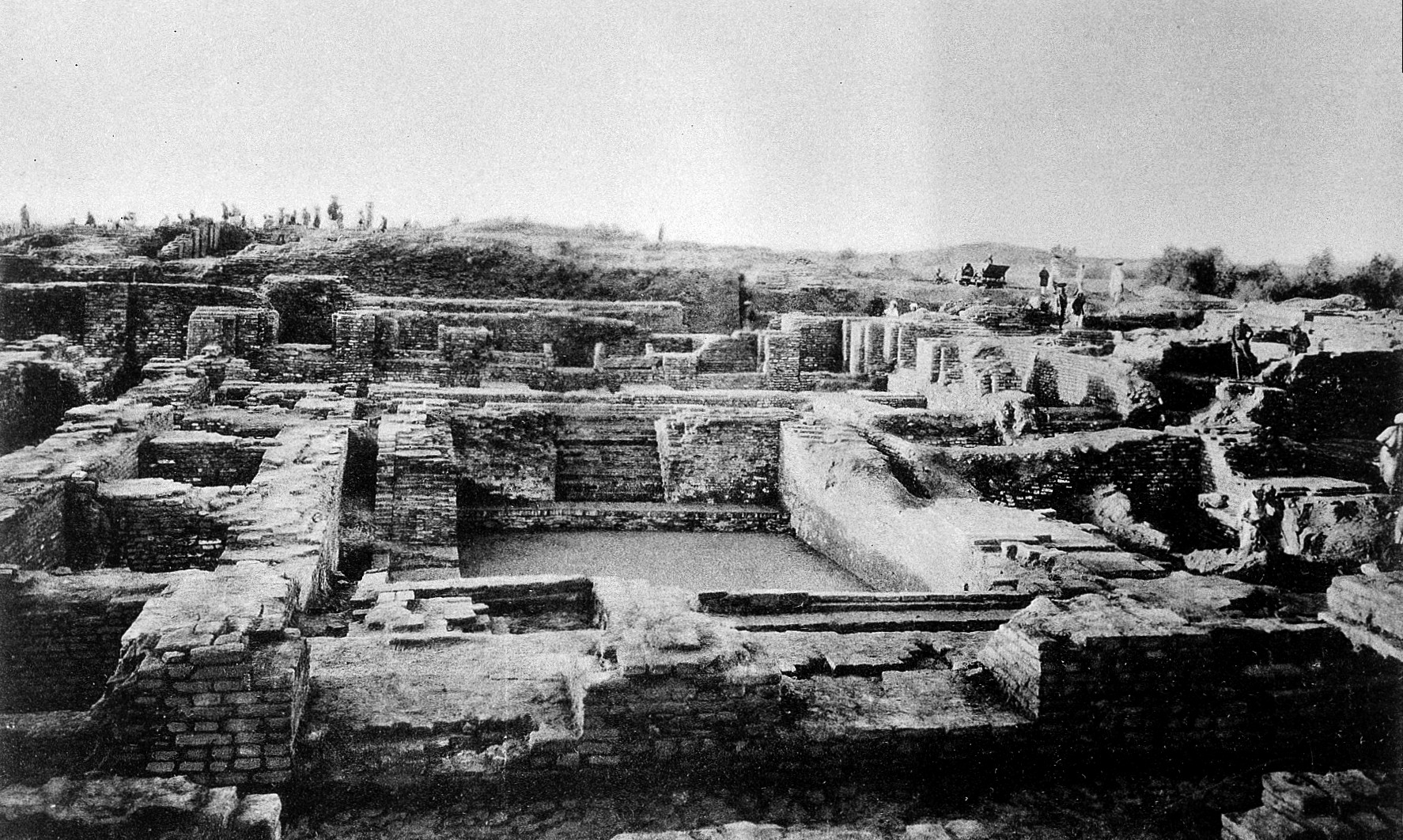
During 1922-1927 archaeological excavations

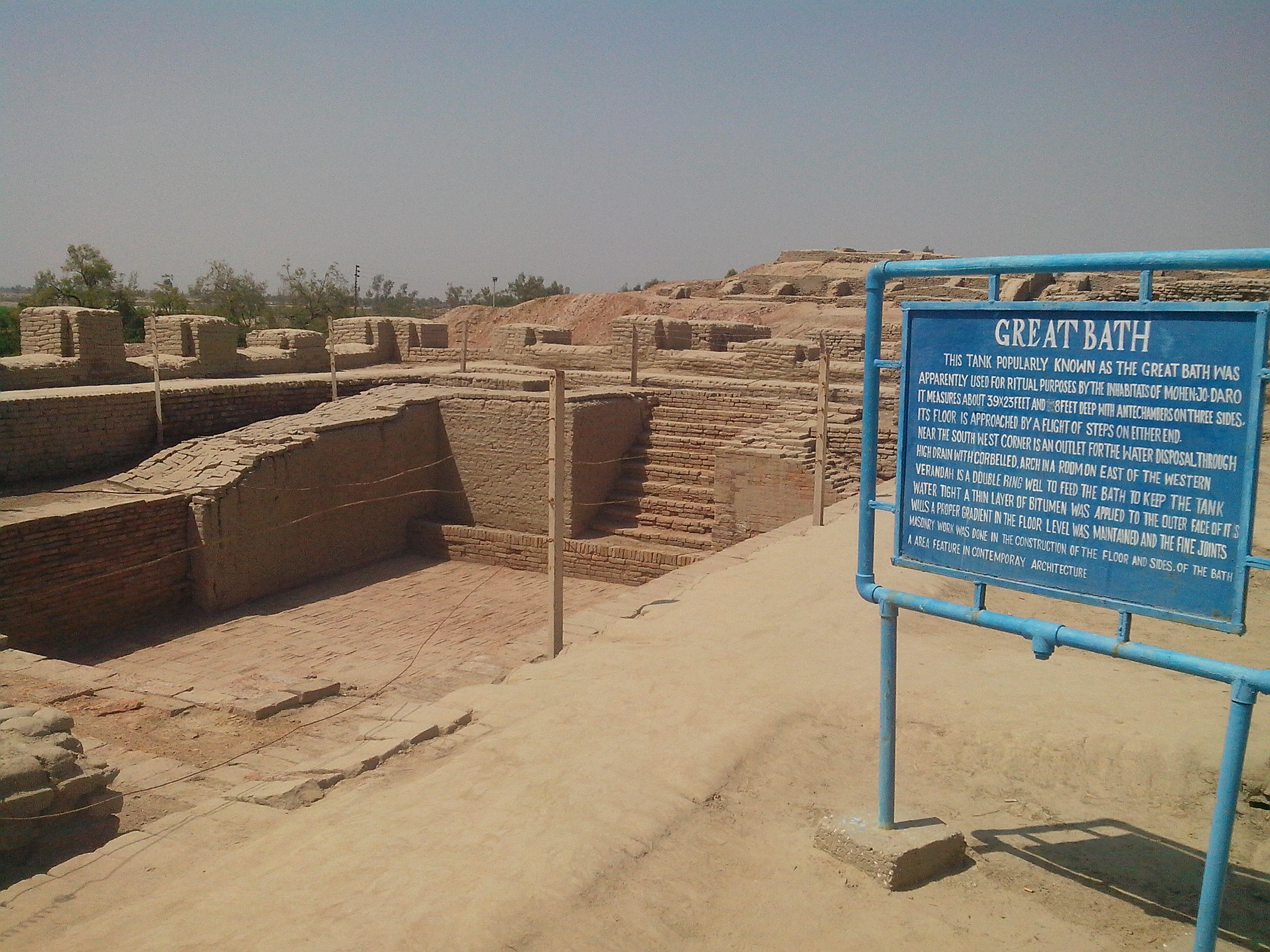
Explanatory sign

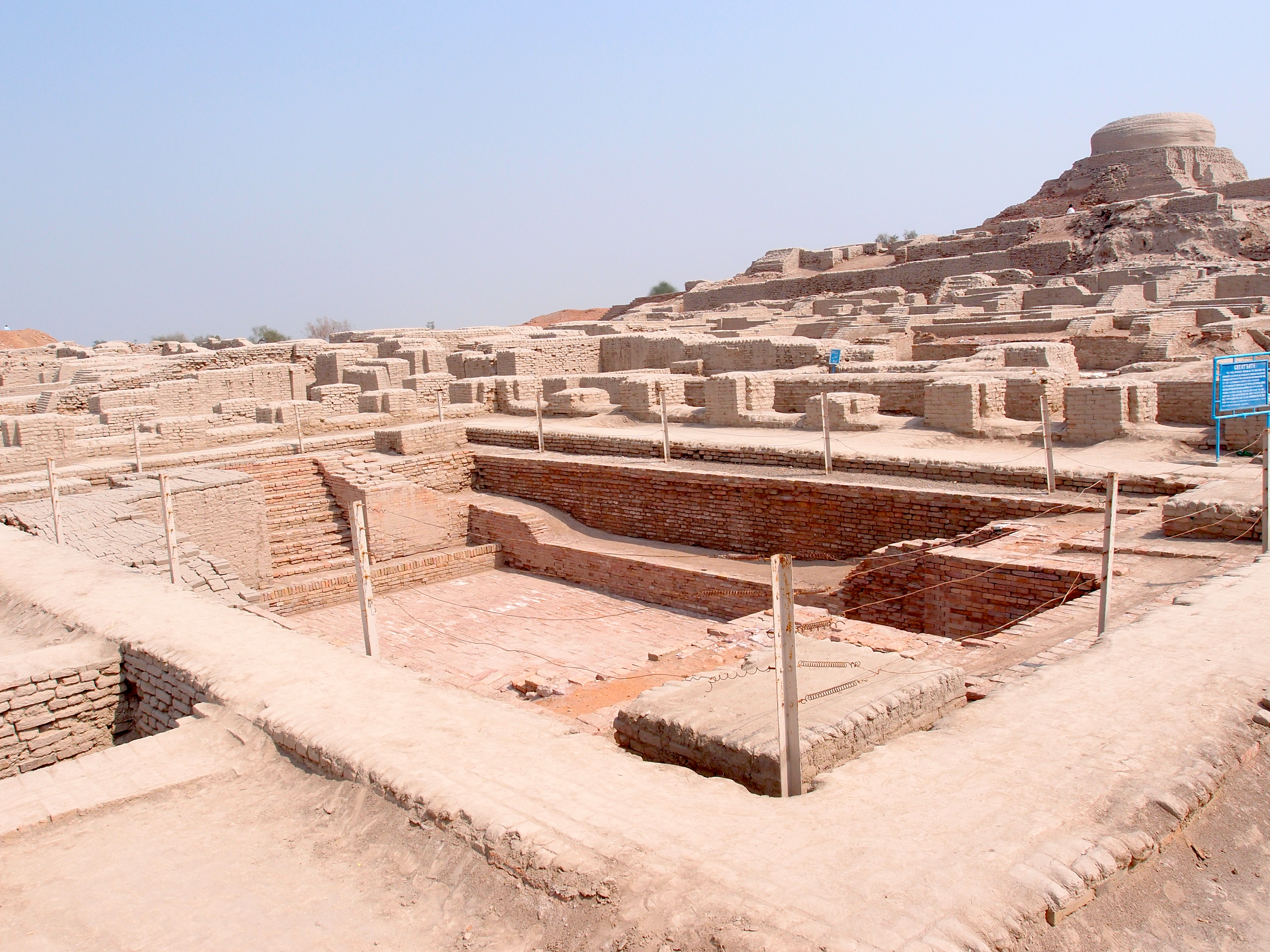
General view

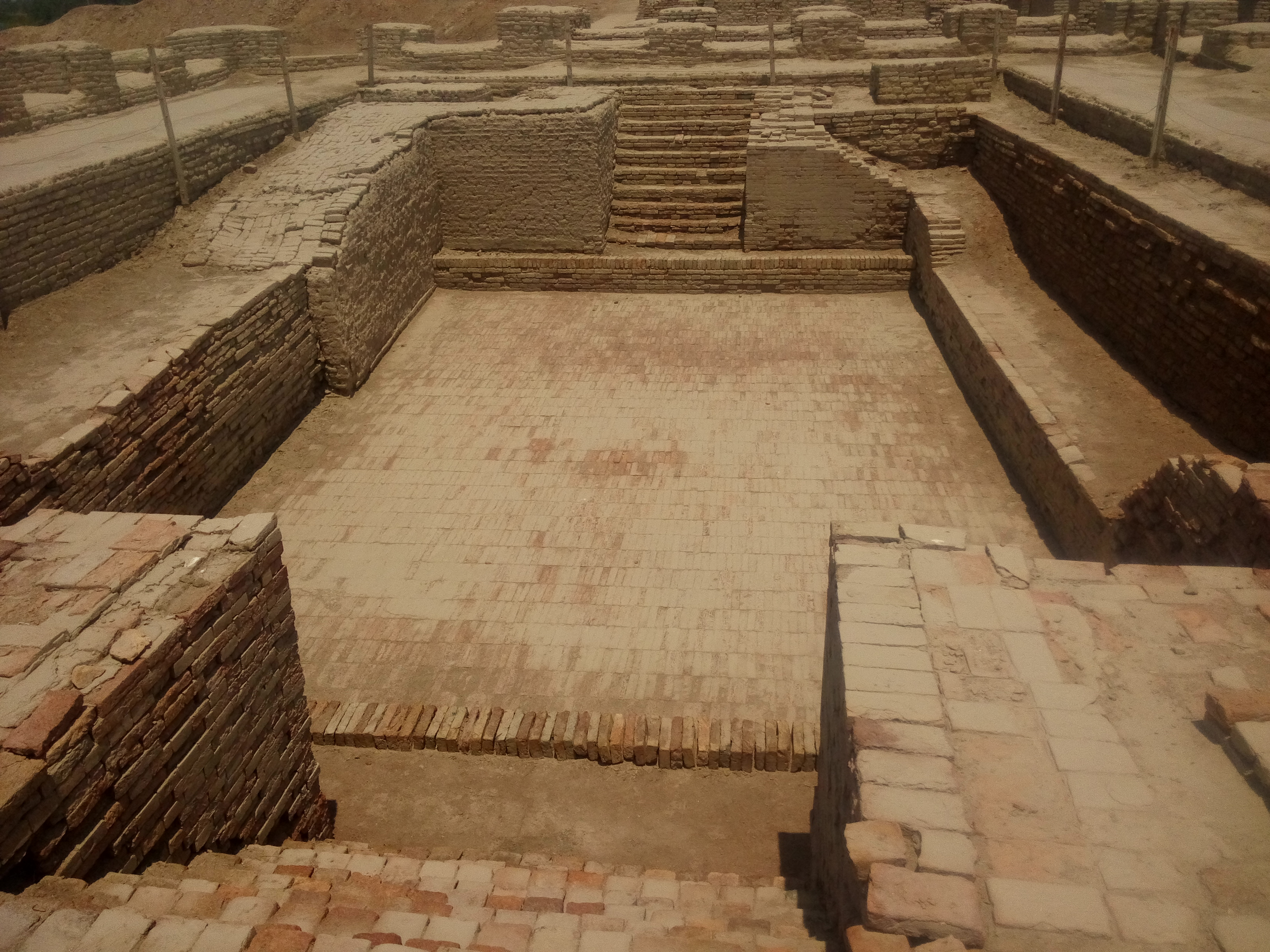
View of tank with both staircases

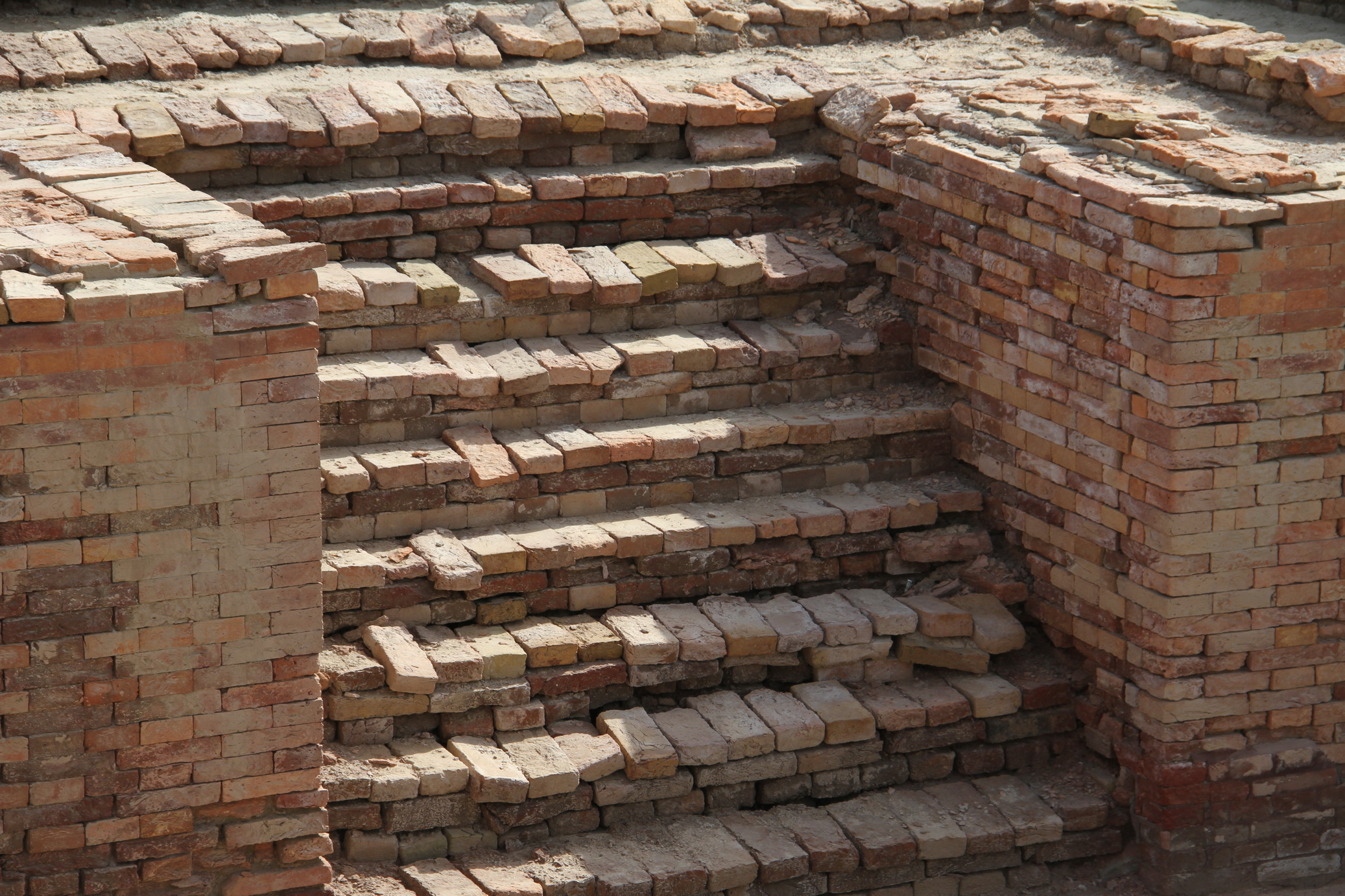
Staircase

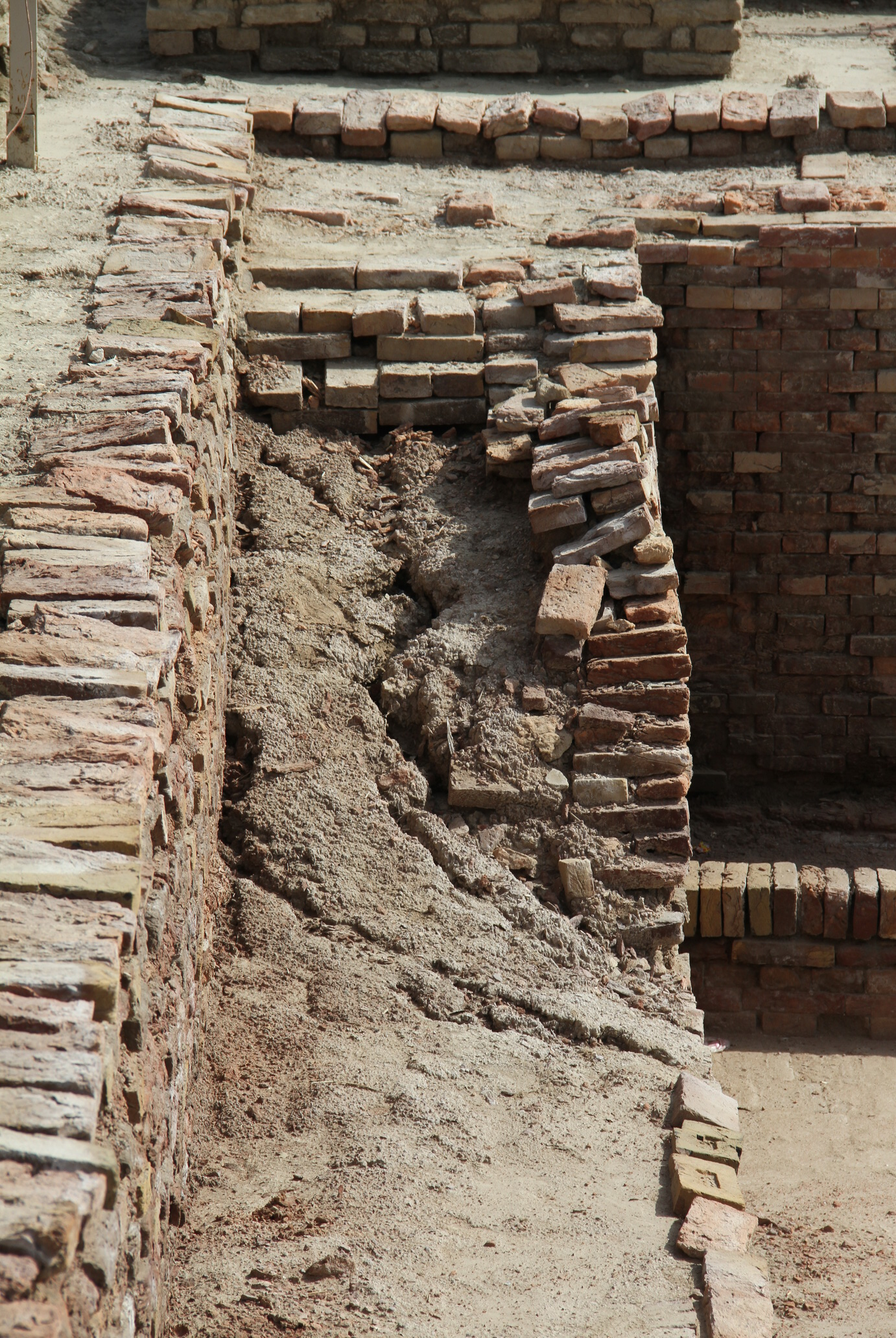
Masonry detail

== Bibliography ==
- Kenoyer, Jonathan Mark. Two sets of indexed images: Mohenjo-daro!, 103 slides. See "Great Bath, SD Area", slides 23-32; and Around the Indus in 90 Slides, introduction and slides 8-9 & 12. 1995–2022. Accessed 2 July 2012, re-accessed 11 July 2022.
