= Rehman Dheri =

Ancient settlement in Pakistan

Rehman Dheri رحمان ڈھیری
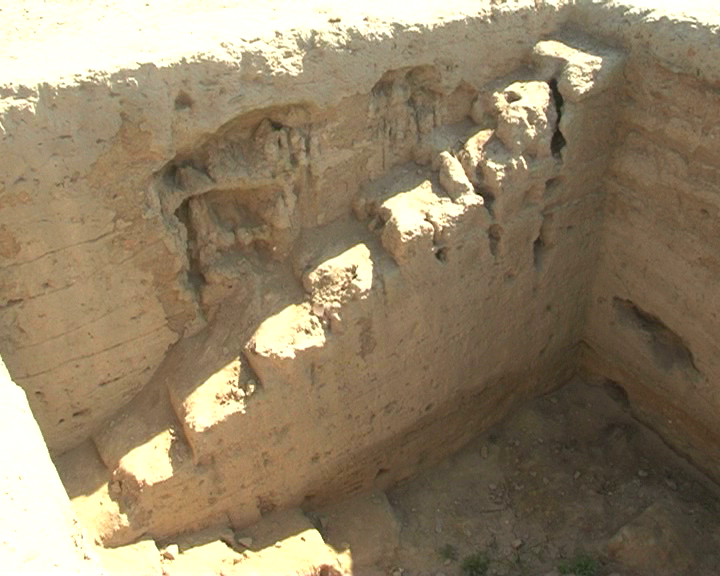
- The site in 2016

- Location in Khyber Pakhtunkhwa, Pakistan
- 31.945870°N 70.885090°E
- Type: Settlement
- Location: Khyber Pakhtunkhwa, Pakistan

History
- Built: c. 3300 BC
- Abandoned: c. 1900 BC

Rehman Dheri or sometime Rahman Dheri (Urdu: رحمان ڈھیری) is a Pre-Harappan Archaeological Site situated near Dera Ismail Khan in the Khyber Pakhtunkhwa province of Pakistan. This is one of the oldest urbanised centres found to date in South Asia. Dated (c. 3300 - c. 1900 BC), the site is situated 22 kilometres (14 mi) north of Dera Ismail Khan. It is on the Tentative List for future World Heritage Sites in Pakistan.

== Location ==
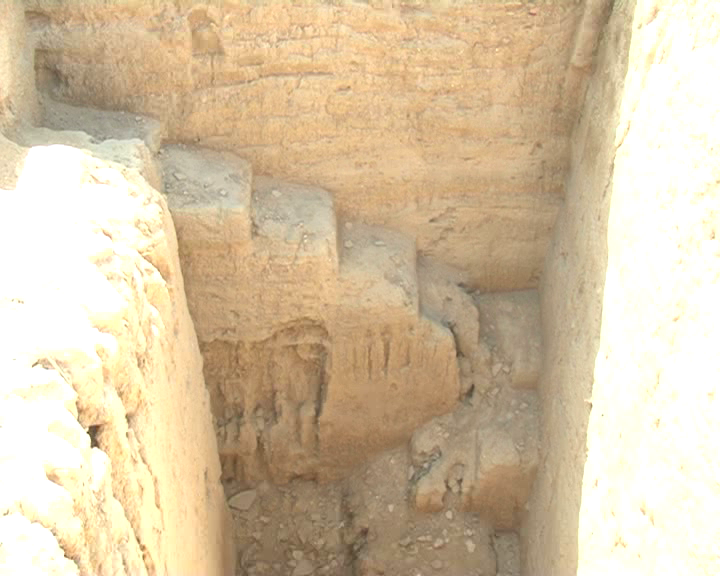
A well with descending steps in Rehman Dher

The site is located on the Gomal River Plain, which is part of the Indus River watershed. It is close to where the Zhob River flows into the Gomal River. Since the earliest occupation, except for the extension outside the city in the south, the entire habitation area was enclosed by a massive wall, built from dressed blocks made from clay slabs. The low rectangular mound is covering about 22 hectares and standing 4.5 meters above the surrounding field.

Near Rehman Dheri, there's an unexcavated Harappan site of Hisham Dheri. This indicates that, in some regions, Kot Dijian (such as Rehman Dheri) and Harappan communities coexisted side by side.

== Cultural context ==
The first excavated site of this type of culture is Kot Diji. Rehman Dheri, is considered oldest example of this culture. Kot Diji and Amri are close to each other in Sindh, they earlier developed indigenous culture which had common elements, later they came in contact with Harappan culture and fully developed into Harappan culture. Earliest examples of artifacts belonging to this culture were found at Rehman Dheri. These sites have pre-Harappan indigenous cultural levels, distinct from the culture of Harappa, these are at Banawali (level I), Kot Diji (level 3A), Amri (level II). Rehman Dheri also has a pre Kot Diji phase (RHD1 3300-2800 BC) which are not part of IVC culture. Kot Diji has two later phases that continue into and alongside Mature Harappan Phase (RHDII and RHDII 2500-2100 BC). Fortified towns found here are dated as follows.

- Kot Diji (3300 BC), is the type site, located in Sindh in Pakistan.
- Amri (3600–3300 BC), also has non-Harappan phases daring 6000 BC to 4000 BC, and later Harappan Phses till 1300 BC.
- Kalibangan (3500 BC – 2500 BC), in northwest Rajasthan in India on Ghaggar River.
- Rehman Dheri, 3300 BC, 3300-2800 BC is pre Kot Diji phase.

== Cultural finds ==
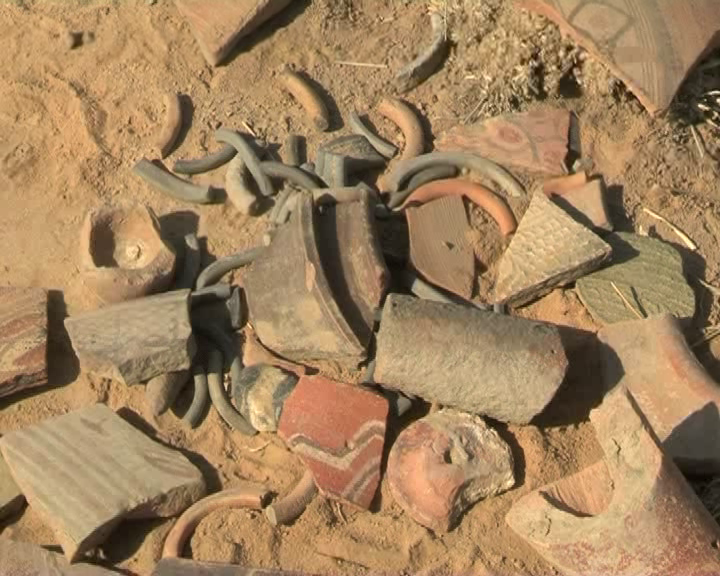
Pottery at the archaeological site of Rehman Dheri

The mound is rectangular is shape with a grid-like street network. The walls demarcating individual buildings and avenue frontages are still clearly visible, and it’s easy to recognize some small-scale industrial areas; within the site, eroded kilns and scatters of slag have been found.

- The fortified town shows sign of town planning. Pottery, and stone and metal tools were found.
- Beads were made from lapis lazuli and turquoise. Terracotta figurines were similar to Gumla and Mehrgarh IV forms at the early stages, but later developed their own distinctive style.
- Seals have been found made from ivory, from fired steatite and shell. Some square seals from Rehman Dheri were designed for hanging on a string. This type of steatite seal became common in the later Indus cities.
- No writing was discovered, though some type of notations on the pottery were observed. These 'potter’s marks', engraved or painted, are "strikingly similar to those appearing in the Mature Indus symbol system".

== Archeological phases ==
In Rehman Dehri the archeological sequence is over 4.5 meters deep and it covers a series of over 1,400 years that was begun c. 3300 BC. Reham Dehri characterizes different periods which includes the period from c. 3300-2850 BC, c. 2850-2500 BC, and the last is from c. 2500-1900 BC.

In its earliest phases it is accepted that the settlement receives its formal planning and that consequent stages extended the plan over time. Even though the excavators have cut a number of deep trenches into the lower levels, the uncovered area was too limited to study the spatial sharing of craft activities. So the occupation of Rehman Dheri may have been more ancient than is presently attested.

In the middle of the third millennium BC, at the beginning of the mature Indus phase, the site was abandoned. There was limited reoccupation.

Some more records are found at the neighbouring archaeological mound Hisham Dheri.

Due to the recent developments, the plans of the Early Harappan settlement were disturbed.

This site represents the earliest urban settlement on the sub-continent, with a very rich bead industry. It was earlier than the Kot Diji-Sothi complex.

== Tochi-Gomal Cultural Phase ==
Recent research has revealed a Tochi-Gomal Cultural Phase in the Gomal Plain of Northwest Pakistan. Rehman Dheri was a part of that cultural sequence.

This was the culture that flourished in the Bannu Basin and Dera Ismail Khan region of Khyber Pakhtunkhwa at the end of Neolithic Age.

"Typological and chronological sequence suggests that the Tochi-Gomal Phase co-existed for a certain period with other contemporaneous regional cultures of South Asia such as the Ravi (Ravi-Hakra) Phase in the Punjab; Amri-Nal culture in Sindh; Togau & Kechi Beg Phases in Baluchistan, and Sothi-Siswal culture in Rajasthan, India."

The Tochi-Gomal Phase followed the local Neolithic phase, as represented in this area at Jhandi Babar. After Tochi-Gomal, the Kot Diji culture followed, and it was also represented at Rehman Dheri, as well as at nearby Gumla.

The inscribed seals and sherds of Tochi-Gomal phase may have contributed significantly to the development of the writing system of the mature Indus Civilization. The animals and the symbols depicted on the earliest seal found at Rehman Dheri remind us of the animals and symbols as were portrayed later during the Mature Indus Civilization.

Also, it was during the Tochi-Gomal phase that the progress from handmade to wheel thrown pottery had occurred.

== See also ==
- Indus Valley civilization
- Hydraulic engineering of the Indus Valley Civilization
- List of Indus Valley Civilization sites
- List of inventions and discoveries of the Indus Valley Civilization
- Periodisation of the Indus Valley Civilisation
