= List of inventions and discoveries of the Indus Valley Civilisation =

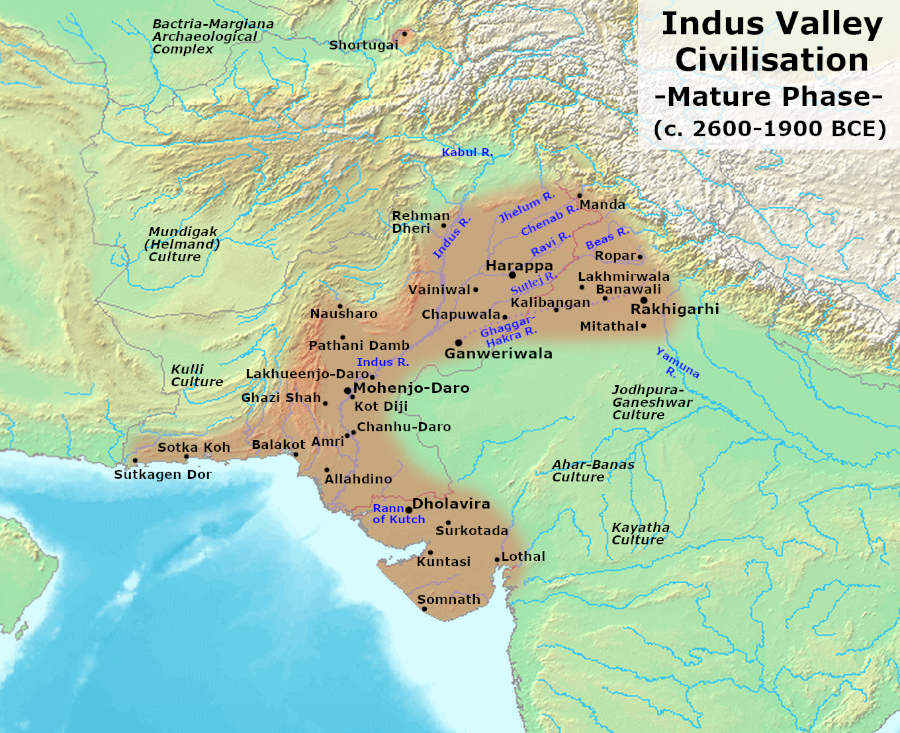
The extent of the Indus Valley Civilisation

This list of inventions and discoveries of the Indus Valley Civilisation lists the technological and civilisational achievements of the Indus Valley Civilisation, an ancient civilisation which flourished in the Bronze Age around the general region of the Indus River and Ghaggar-Hakra River in what is today Pakistan and northwestern India.

== Inventions ==
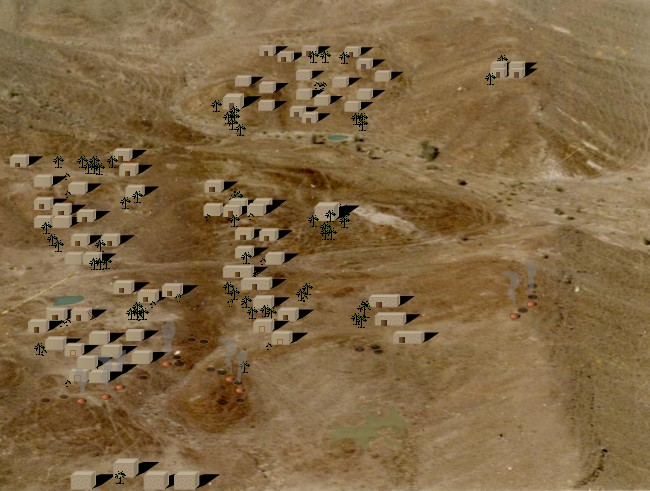
Computer-aided reconstruction of Harappan coastal settlement in Pakistan on the westernmost outreaches of the civilisation

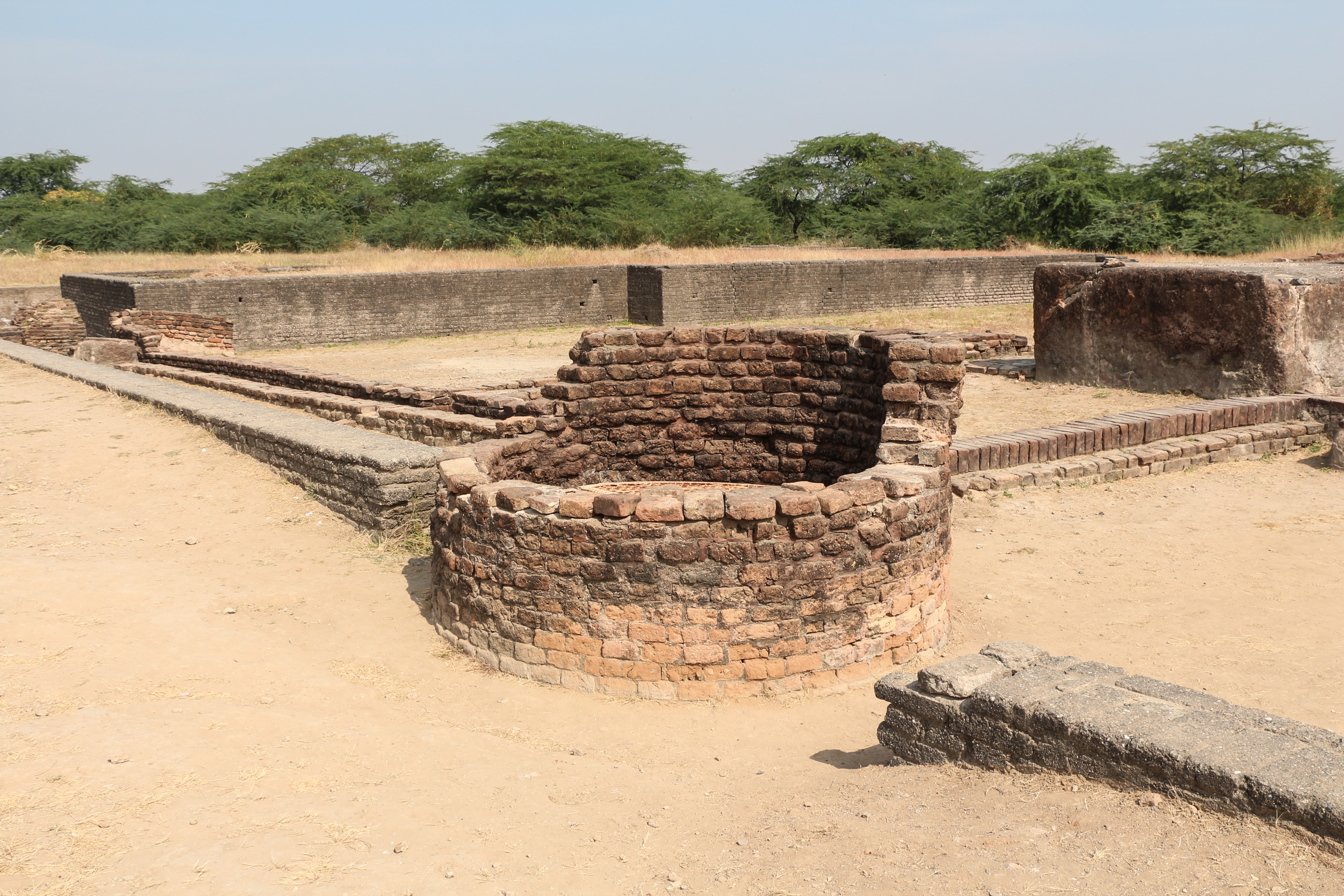
An ancient well, and the city drainage canals, in Lothal.

- Button, ornamental: Buttons—made from seashell—were used in the Indus Valley Civilisation for ornamental purposes by 2000 BCE. Some buttons were carved into geometric shapes and had holes pierced into them so that they could be attached to clothing by using a thread. Ian McNeil (1990) holds that: "The button, in fact, was originally used more as an ornament than as a fastening, the earliest known being found at Mohenjo-daro in the Indus Valley. It is made of a curved shell and about 5000 years old."
- Shipyard: The world's oldest shipyard has been found in Lothal. It is situated 80 km south of Ahmedabad in Gujarat.
- Cockfighting: Cockfighting was a pastime in the Indus Valley Civilisation in what today is Pakistan by 2000 BCE and one of the uses of the fighting cock. The Encyclopædia Britannica (2008)—on the origins of cockfighting—holds: "The game fowl is probably the nearest to the Indian red jungle fowl (Gallus gallus), from which all domestic chickens are believed to be descended...The sport was popular in ancient times in the Indian subcontinent, China, the Persian Empire, and other Eastern countries and was introduced into Greece in the time of Themistocles (c. 524–460 BCE). The sport spread throughout Asia Minor and Sicily. For a long time the Romans affected to despise this "Greek diversion," but they ended up adopting it so enthusiastically that the agricultural writer Columella (1st century CE) complained that its devotees often spent their whole patrimony in betting at the side of the pit."
- Stepwell: Earliest clear evidence of the origins of the stepwell is found in the Indus Valley Civilisation's archaeological site at Mohenjo Daro in Pakistan and Dholavira, India. The three features of stepwells in the subcontinent are evident from one particular site, abandoned by 2500 BCE, which combines a bathing pool, steps leading down to water, and figures of some religious importance into one structure. The early centuries immediately before the common era saw the Buddhists and the Jains of India adapt the stepwells into their architecture. Both the wells and the form of ritual bathing reached other parts of the world with Buddhism. Rock-cut step wells in the subcontinent date from 200-400 CE. Subsequently, the wells at Dhank (550-625 CE) and stepped ponds at Bhinmal (850-950 CE) were constructed.
- Circular saw: Excavated in Lothal.
- Bow Drill: Bow drills were used in Mehrgarh between the 4th and 5th millennium BC. This bow drill—used to drill holes into lapis lazuli and carnelian—was made of green jasper. Similar drills were found in other parts of the Indus Valley Civilisation and Iran one millennium later.

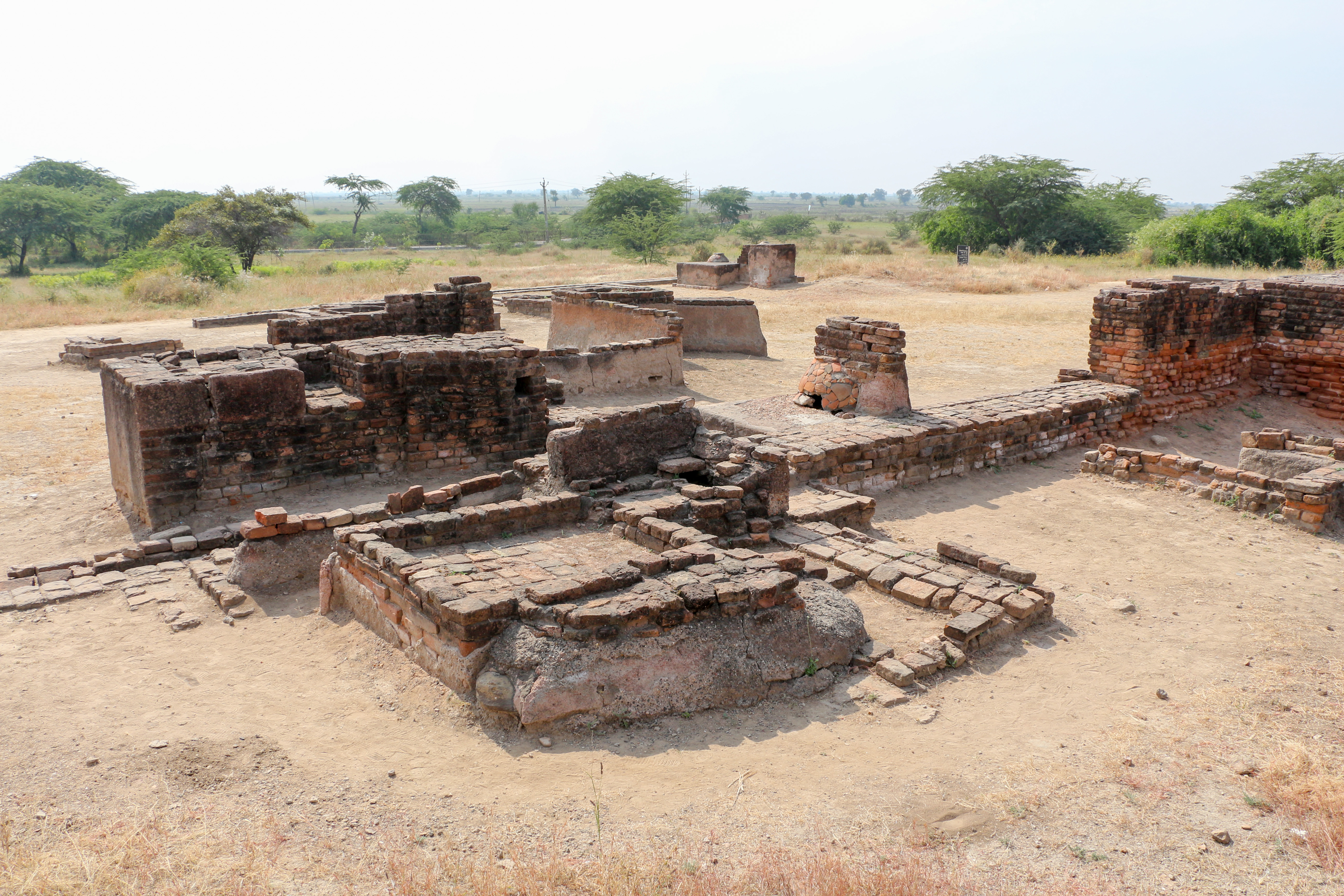
Bathing platform, with squat toilet (to the top right of square platform), connectod to brick drain, city of Lothal, c.2350 BC.

- Public Baths: The earliest public baths are found in the ruins in of the Indus Valley Civilisation. According to John Keay, the "Great Bath" of Mohenjo Daro in present-day Pakistan was the size of 'a modest municipal swimming pool', complete with stairs leading down to the water at each one of its ends.
- Grid Plan: Rehman Dheri contains the earliest evidence of a grid-planned city in south Asia dated c. 3300 BCE. By 2600 BC, Mohenjo-daro and Harappa, and other major cities of the Indus Valley Civilisation, were built with blocks divided by a grid of straight streets, running north–south and east–west. Each block was subdivided by small lanes.
- Toilet: Mohenjo-Daro circa 2800 BC is cited as having some of the most advanced, with toilets built into outer walls of homes. These dry toilets had chutes, that fed waste into cesspits or street drains.
- Drainage System: The Indus Valley Civilisation had advanced sewerage and drainage systems. All houses in the major cities of Harappa and Mohenjo-daro had access to water and drainage facilities. Waste water was directed to covered gravity sewers, which lined the major streets.
- Distillation: A terracota distillation apparatus in the Indus Valley in West Pakistan dates from around 3000 BCE.
- Cotton industry: The Indus cotton industry was well-developed and some methods used in cotton spinning and fabrication continued to be used until the industrialization of India.
- Public Litter bins: Archaeologists have found several brick containers that were strategically located along the street junctions of Mohenjo-Daro specifically for garbage disposal.
- Dentistry: The evidence of dentistry being practised as far back as 7000 BCE. An IVC site in Mehrgarh indicates that this form of dentistry involved curing tooth related disorders with bow drills operated, perhaps, by skilled bead crafters. The reconstruction of this ancient form of dentistry showed that the methods used were reliable and effective.
- Touchstone: Found in excavations from Banawali, Haryana.
- Signboard: One of the most significant discoveries at Dholavira was made in one of the side rooms of the northern gateway of the city, and is generally known as the Dholavira Signboard. The Harappans had arranged and set pieces of the mineral gypsum to form ten large symbols or letters on a big wooden board. At some point, the board fell flat on its face. The wood decayed, but the arrangement of the letters survived. The letters of the signboard are comparable to large bricks that were used in nearby walls. Each sign is about 37 cm (15 in) high and the board on which the letters were inscribed was about 3 m (9.8 ft) long. The inscription is one of the longest in the Indus script, with one symbol appearing four times, and this and its large size and public nature make it a key piece of evidence cited by scholars arguing that the Indus script represents full literacy. A four-sign inscription with large letters on a sand stone is also found at this site, considered the first of such inscriptions on sand stone at any of the Harappan sites.
- Hydraulic Engineering:
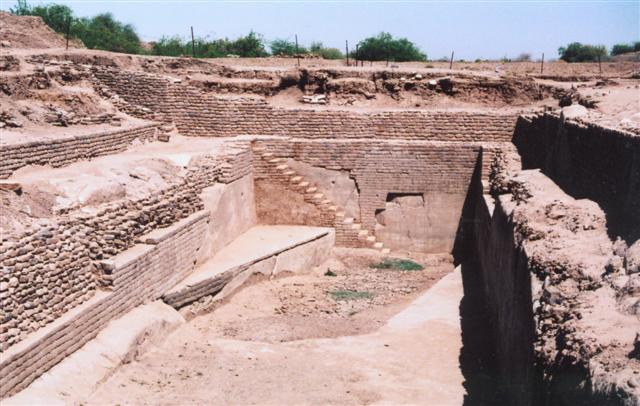
  One of the water reservoirs, with steps, at Dholavira
  "The kind of efficient system of Harappans of Dholavira, developed for conservation, harvesting and storage of water speaks eloquently about their advanced hydraulic engineering, given the state of technology in the third millennium BCE" says R.S.Bist, Joint Director General (Rtd.), Archaeological Survey of India. One of the unique features of Dholavira is the sophisticated water conservation system of channels and reservoirs, the earliest found anywhere in the world, built completely of stone. The city had massive reservoirs, three of which are exposed. They were used for storing fresh water brought by rains or to store water diverted from two nearby rivulets. This clearly came in response to the desert climate and conditions of Kutch, where several years may pass without rainfall. A seasonal stream which runs in a north–south direction near the site was dammed at several points to collect water.
- Dams: In Neolithic Mehrgarh pre-Harappan phase (7000-3200 BCE) people had developed a water storage system called Bund to trap rain and torrential waters in the semi-arid region of Kach between the Indus river and Balochistan mountains where the seasonal Bolan river flows. Stone walls were built along the slope of torrential river beds to serve as reservoir dams, restrict flow of water and for diverting water into canals for irrigation.
- Stadium: the world's earliest stadium with terraced stands was constructed at Dholavira and Juni Kuran. Two stadiums have been identified at the ancient site, one is considered a ceremonial ground, another, a small stadium. At Juni Kuran, two separate stadiums for commoners and the elite have been discovered.
- Bronze sculpture: Dancing Girl from Mohenjo-daro belonging to the Harappan civilisation dating back to 2500 BCE is said to be the first bronze statue.
- Lost wax casting: a detailed, full-field photoluminescence study of a 6,000 year old copper "wheel" amulet from Mehrgarh in Balochistan has opened the door to many new facts about this period of history. This study by Ipanema, the European center for the study of ancient materials, believes that this is the oldest known example of the "lost wax" casting technique, one of the most important innovations in the history of metallurgy
- Shampoo: Pre-Harappan level of Banawali (2750-2500 BCE), Haryana have revealed traces of a mixture of shikakai with soap nuts and Amla (Indian Gooseberry) of what would constitute herbal shampoo, exhibiting ancient roots of South Asian hygiene.
- Mordant (Dye Fixing): Mordants for fixing dyes were used since the Indus Valley Civilisation, it exhibited Indian mastery over clothes dyeing which was unrivalled until the invention of western chemical dyes.
- Stoneware: Earliest stonewares, predecessors of porcelain have been recorded at the Indus Valley Civilisation sites of Harappa and Mohenjo Daro, they were used for making stoneware bangles.
- Seven Stones: An Indian subcontinent game also called Pitthu is played in rural areas and has its origins in the Indus Valley Civilisation.
- English Bond: This bond has alternating stretching and heading courses, with the headers centred over the midpoint of the stretchers, and perpends in each alternate course aligned. Harappan architecture in South Asia was the first use, anywhere in the world, of so-called English bond in building with bricks.
- Saw, modern: True saws with modern teeth were a Harappan invention.
- Needle's eye: The eye of the needle was another Harappan contribution.
- Etched Carnelian beads: are a type of ancient decorative beads made from carnelian with an etched design in white. They were made according to a technique of alkaline-etching developed by the Harappans during the 3rd millennium BCE and were widely disperced from China in the east to Greece in the west.

== Discoveries ==
- Gemstones and Lapis Lazuli: Lapis lazuli artifacts, dated to 7570 BCE, have been found at Bhirrana, which is the oldest site of the Indus Valley Civilisation.
- Sesame oil: Sesame seeds were one of the first crops processed for oil as well as one of the earliest condiments. Sesame was cultivated during the Indus Valley Civilisation and was the main oil crop. It was probably exported to Mesopotamia around 2500 BC.
- Pashmina: Samples of wool fibres discovered from corroded copper artifacts from Harappa dating back to the Indus Valley Civilisation are extremely fine and resemble Pashmina and Shatoosh.

== See also ==
- Sanitation of the Indus Valley civilisation
- List of Indus Valley civilisation sites
- List of Indian inventions and discoveries
- List of Pakistani inventions and discoveries
- Indus Valley Civilisation
