= Sanitation of the Indus Valley Civilisation =

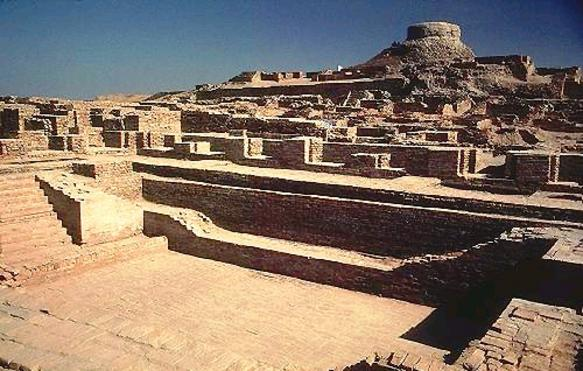
Great Bath, Mohenjo-daro

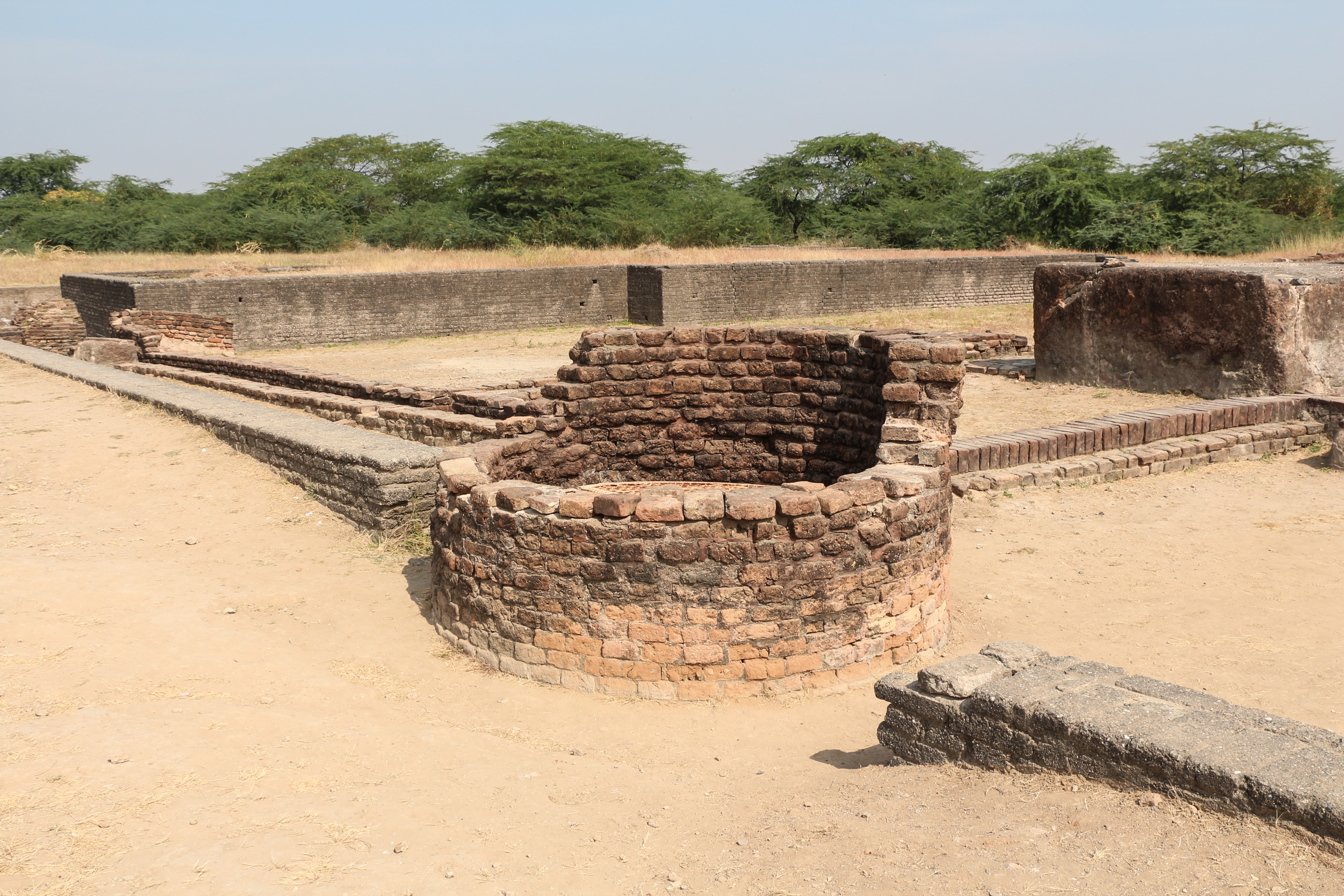
A water well in Lothal

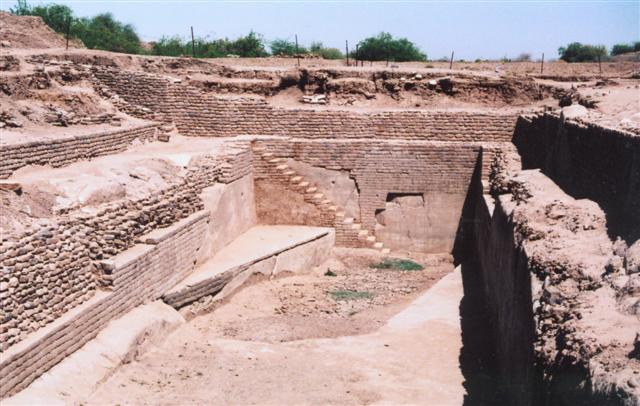
Water reservoir, with steps, at Dholavira, Gujarat, India

The Indus Valley Civilisation, located in the northwestern regions of South Asia, was prominent in infrastructure, hydraulic engineering, and had many water supply and sanitation devices that are the first known examples of their kind.

== General ==
Most houses of Indus Valley were made from mud, dried mud bricks, or clay bricks of a standardised size. The urban areas of the Indus Civilisation included public and private baths. Many of the buildings at Mohenjo-Daro had two or more stories. They also had a sophisticated drainage system to dispose waste materials out of town.

The earliest evidence of urban sanitation was seen in Harappa, Mohenjo-daro, and the recently discovered Rakhigarhi. This urban plan included the world's first urban sanitation systems. Within the city, individual homes or groups of homes obtained water from wells.

Devices such as shadoofs and sakias were used to lift water to ground level.

Stepwells have mainly been used in the Indian subcontinent.

Several courtyard houses had both a washing platform and a dedicated toilet/waste disposal hole. The toilet holes would be flushed by emptying a jar of water, drawn from the house's central well, through a clay brick pipe, and into a shared brick drain, that would feed into an adjacent soak pit (cesspit). The soak pits would be periodically emptied of their solid matter, possibly to be used as fertilizer. Most houses also had private wells. City walls functioned as a barrier against floods.

== Drainage system ==
Ruins like Mohenjo-Daro in Sindh and Dholavira in Gujarat had settlements with some of the ancient world's most sophisticated sewage systems. They included drainage channels, rainwater harvesting, and street ducts.

Sewage was disposed of through underground drains built with precisely laid bricks, and a sophisticated water management system with numerous reservoirs was established. In the drainage systems, drains from houses were connected to wider public drain laid along the main streets. The drains had holes at regular intervals which were used for cleaning and inspection. The water from bathrooms on the roofs and upper stories was carried through enclosed terracotta pipes or open chutes that emptied into the street drains. The Indus valley's drainage system existed 4,500 years ago.

== Mohenjo-daro ==
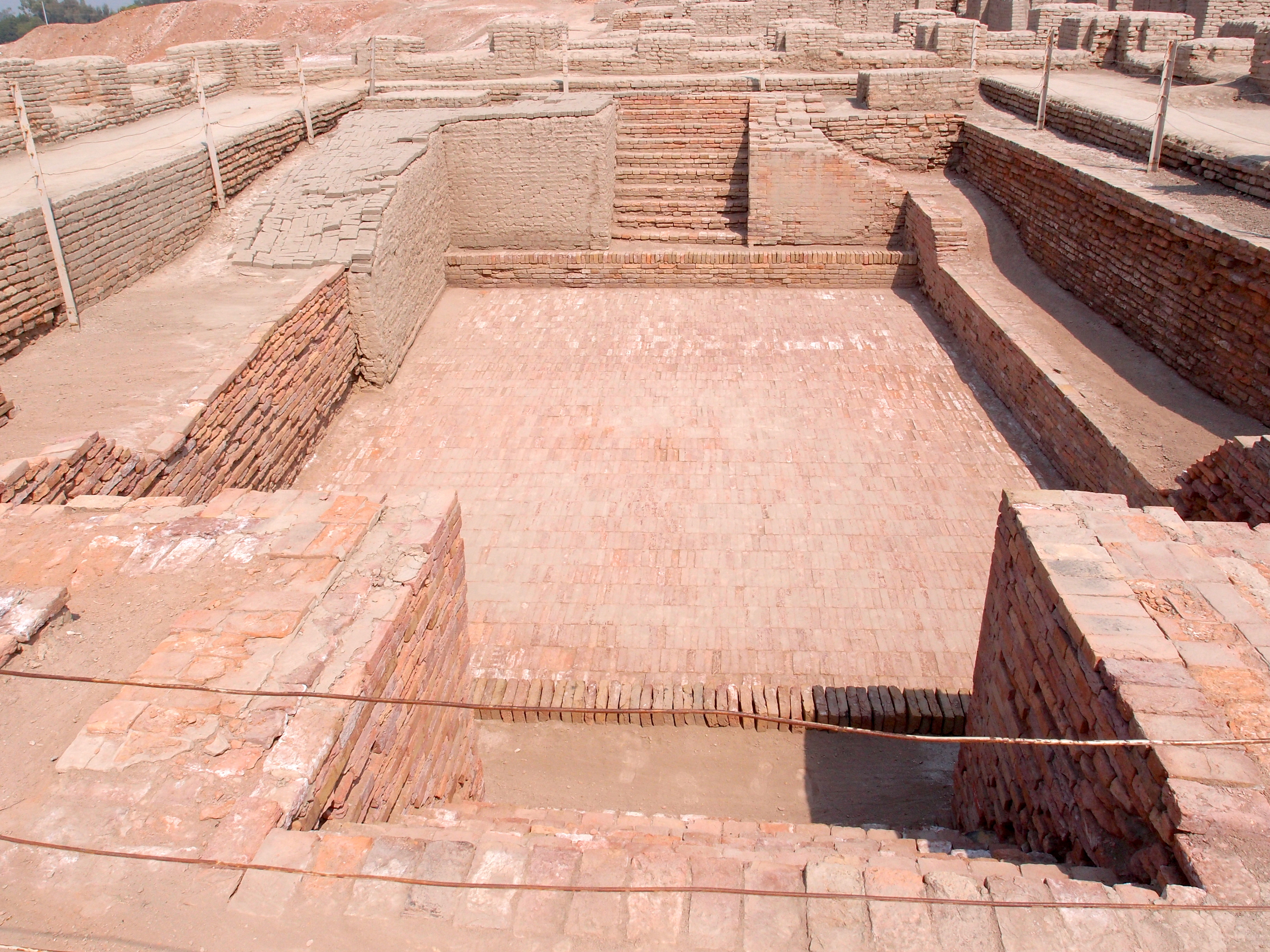
The Great Bath

Mohenjo-daro, located in Sindh, Pakistan, is one of the best excavated and studied settlements from this civilization. The Great Bath might be the first of its kind in the pre-historic period. This ancient town had more than 700 wells. The so-called "Great Granary" is the largest building at Mohenjo-daro and shows the use of granaries in the Indus Valley Civilisation.

== Dholavira ==
Layout of Dholavira

Dholavira, located in Gujarat, India (c. 3000-1500 BC), had a series of water storage tanks and step wells, and its water management system has been called "unique". Dholavira had at least five baths and the size of one is comparable with the Great Bath of Mohenjo-daro.

== Lothal ==
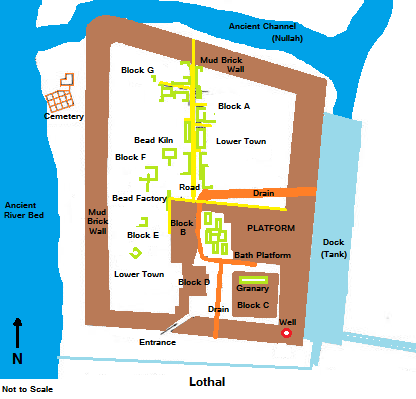
Plan of Lothal

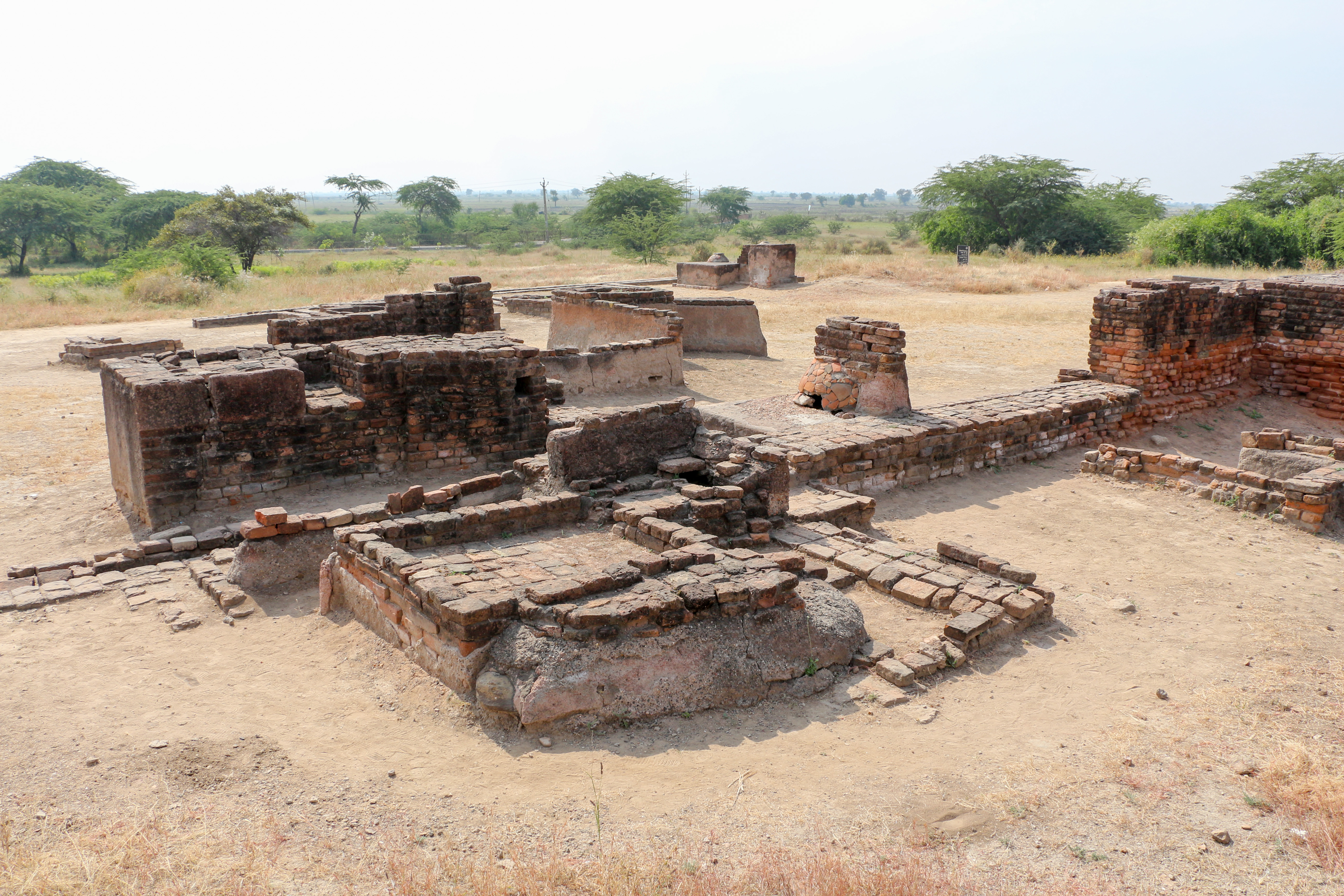
The bathroom-toilet structure of a house in Lothal

Lothal, Gujarat (c. 2350–1900 BC), excavation of the site has identified two wells in the city, one in the acropolis and the other by the dock. In addition, more than a dozen houses of the acropolis possessed their own internal bathing platform which drained into a covered communal sewer constructed of brickwork held together with a gypsum-based mortar and which emptied into a cesspit outside the town's wall. A relatively large house in the acropolis had a bathing platform with an attached latrine, that fed into a separate open drain, and discharged into the town's dock. The Lower town hosts a number of soak pots, large sunken jars with a hole in the bottom, to permit liquids to drain, which were regularly emptied and cleaned.

== See also ==
- Ancient water supply and sanitation
  - History of water supply and sanitation
  - Ancient water conservation in India
  - History of stepwells in Gujarat
  - Important water resource topics of India
- Indus Valley Civilisation
  - Indus Valley Civilisation architecture
  - List of Indus Valley Civilisation sites
  - List of inventions and discoveries of the Indus Valley Civilisation
