= Jhangar phase =

Archaeological culture in the Lower Indus Valley

The Jhangar phase was an archaeological culture, named after the type site Jhangar, that followed the Jhukar phase of the Late Harappan culture in Sindh (i.e., the Lower Indus Valley).

Jhukar and Jhangar phases are collectively called Jhukar and Jhangar culture (1900–1500 BCE). Cemetery H culture (subculture of Late Harrapan IVC phase) in Punjab was contemporaneous to Jhukar-Jhangar culture (subculture of Late Harrapan IVC phase) in Sindh, both have evidence of continuity and change. Rangpur culture in Gujarat, also part of late phase of IVC, was also contemporaneous to both.

It is a non-urban culture, characterised by "crude handmade pottery" and "campsites of a population which was nomadic and mainly pastoralist," and is dated to approximately the late second millennium BCE and early first millennium BCE. In Sindh, urban growth began again after approximately 500 BCE.

== See also ==
- Chronological dating
  - Phases in archaeology
  - Pottery in the Indian subcontinent
- Periodisation of the Indus Valley Civilisation
  - Ahar–Banas culture (3000–1500 BCE)
  - Late Harappan phase of IVC (1900–1500 BCE)
    - Cemetery H culture in Punjab
    - Jhukar–Jhangar culture in Punjab
    - Rangpur culture in Gujarat
- Vedic period
  - Kuru kingdom (1200 – c. 500 BCE)
  - OCP (2000–1500 BCE)
  - Copper Hoard culture (2800–1500 BCE), may or may not be independent of vedic culture
