= Pottery in the Indian subcontinent =

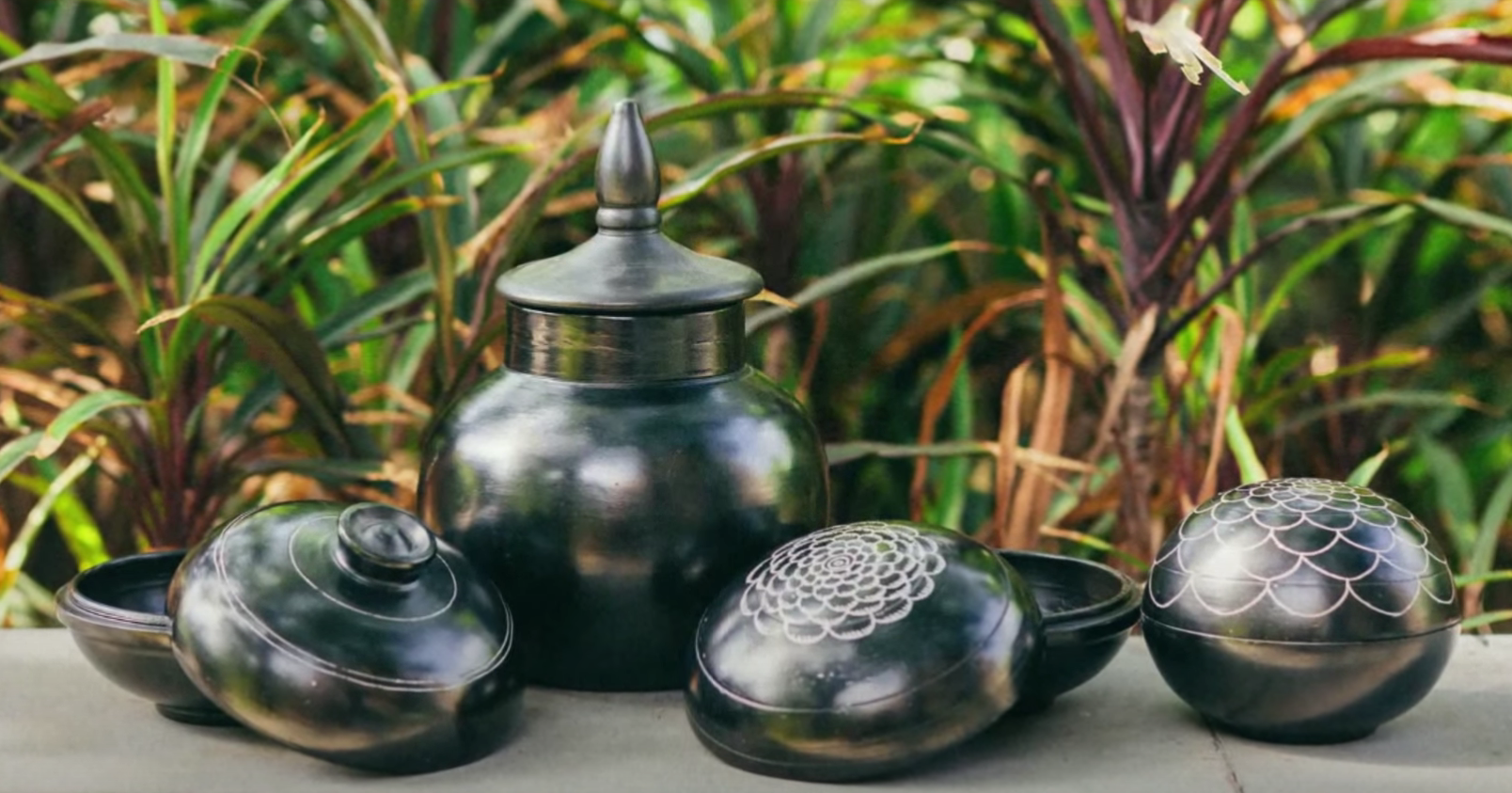
Traditional Nizamabad black pottery from Uttar Pradesh, India.

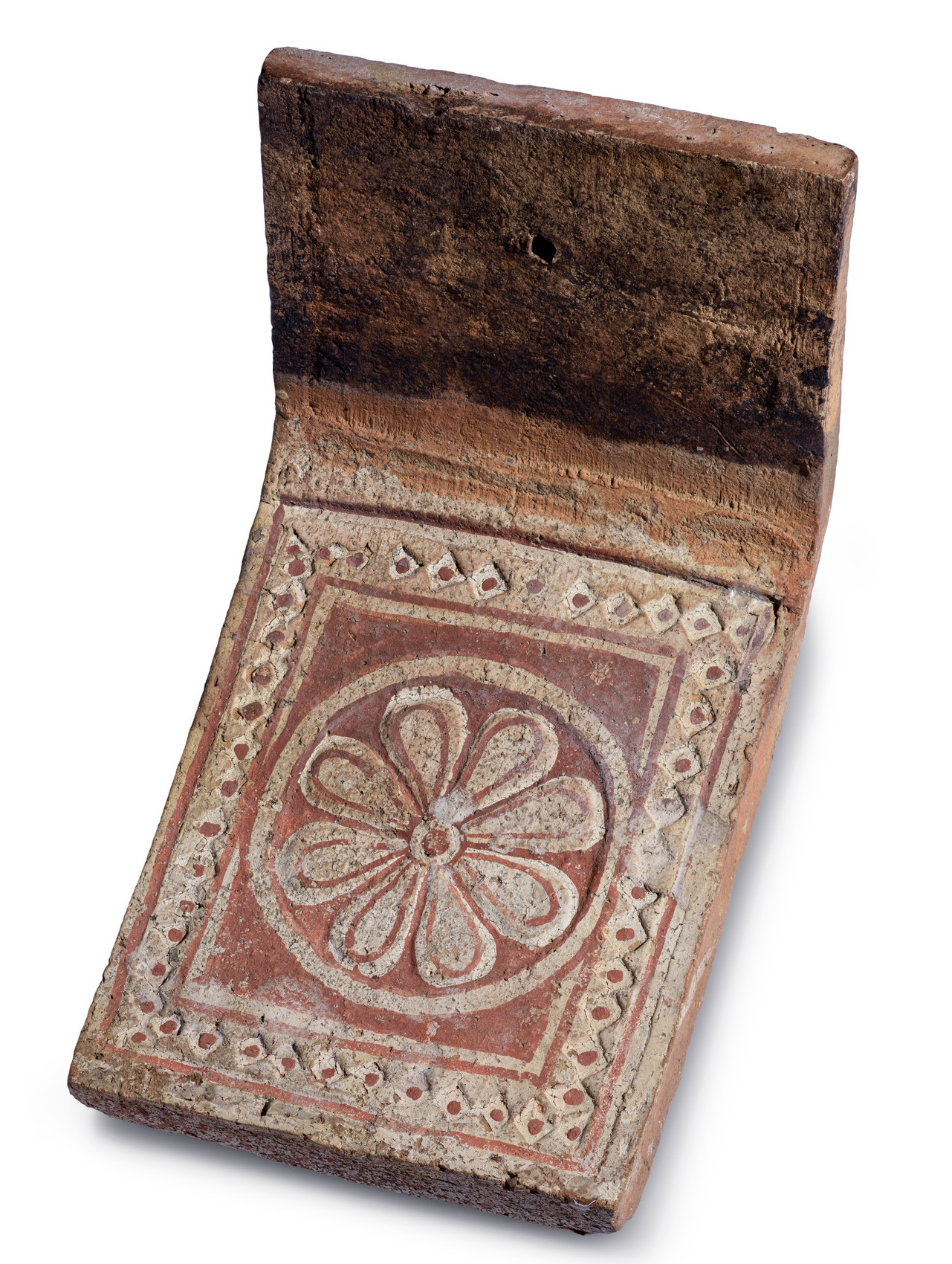
Painted under-eave roof-tile, Sri Lanka, 5th century.

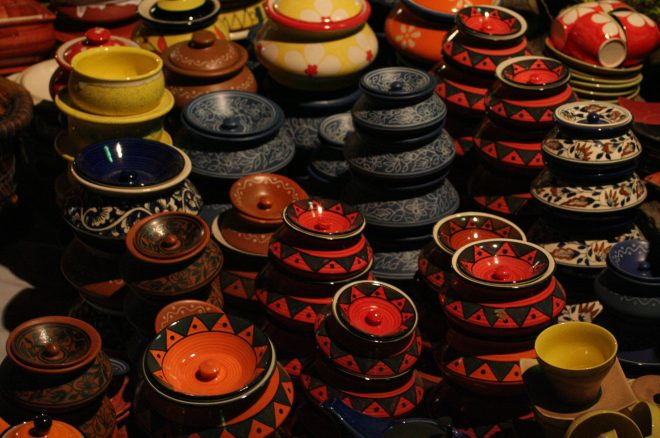
Potteries on display in Dilli Haat market, New Delhi, India.

Pottery in the Indian subcontinent has an ancient history and is one of the most tangible and iconic elements of Indian art. Evidence of pottery has been found in the early settlements of Lahuradewa and later the Indus Valley Civilisation. Today, it is a cultural art that is still practiced extensively in the subcontinent. Until recent times all Indian pottery has been earthenware, including terracotta.

Early glazed ceramics were used for making beads, seals, bangles during Neolithic period but these glazes were very rarely used on pottery. Hindu traditions historically discouraged the use of pottery for eating off, while large matki jars for the storage of water or other things form the largest part of traditional Indian pottery, as well as objects such as lamps. Small simple kulhar cups, and also oil lamps, that are disposable after a single use remain common. Today, pottery thrives as an art form in India. Various platforms, including potters' markets and online pottery boutiques have contributed to this trend.

This article covers pottery vessels, mainly from the ancient Indian cultures known from archaeology. There has also been much figurative sculpture and decorative tilework and roof tiles in ceramics in the subcontinent, with the production of terracotta figurines being widespread in different regions and periods. In Bengal in particular, a lack of stone produced an extensive tradition of architectural sculpture for temples and mosques in terracotta and carved brick. The approximately life-size figures decorating gopurams in South India are usually painted terracotta. Traditional pottery in the subcontinent is usually made by specialized kumhar (Sanskrit: kumbhakära) potter communities.

In 2018, the value of ceramics of all types produced in the Republic of India was projected to reach €7.5 billion in 2022. In 2022, annual production of ceramic tableware in India was estimated to be 40,000 tonnes.

== Mesolithic pottery ==
Mesolithic, also called Middle Stone Age, is an intermediate cultural stage between the Paleolithic (Old Stone Age) which had chipped stone tools and Neolithic (New Stone Age) with polished stone tools. The Mesolithic hunter gatherers had better efficiency than Paleolithic with ability to more diverse range of animal and vegetable food sources.

Cord-Impressed style pottery belongs to 'Mesolithic' ceramic tradition that developed among Vindhya hunter-gatherers during the Mesolithic period. This ceramic style is also found in later Proto-Neolithic phase in nearby regions. This early type of pottery, found at the site of Lahuradewa and Chopanimando, is currently the oldest known pottery tradition in South Asia, dating back to 7,000-6,000 BC.

== Neolithic cultures ==
Neolithic, also called New Stone Age, is "final stage of cultural evolution or technological development among prehistoric humans. It was characterized by stone tools shaped by polishing or grinding, dependence on domesticated plants or animals, settlement in permanent villages, and the appearance of such crafts as pottery and weaving."

=== Ahar-Banas culture (3000 – 1500 BCE) in Rajasthan ===
Ahar–Banas culture is a Chalcolithic archaeological culture on the banks of Ahar River of southeastern Rajasthan state in India, lasting from c. 3000 to 1500 BC, contemporary and adjacent to the Indus Valley Civilisation. Situated along the Banas and Berach Rivers, as well as the Ahar River, the Ahar-Banas people were exploiting the copper ores of the Aravalli Range to make axes and other artefacts. They were sustained on a number of crops, including wheat and barley. The design motifs of the seals are generally quite simple, with wide-ranging parallels from various Indus Civilization sites.

=== Amri-Nal culture (6000 – 1300 BCE) in Sindh and Balochistan ===
Amri-Nal culture: Dated to 4th and 3rd millennia BC the dual typesites are Amri in Sindh and Nal in Balochistan in Pakistan.

Amri, also has non-Harappan phases during 6000 BC to 4000 BC, and later Harappan Phases till 1300 BCE.

=== Bhirrana culture (7570 – 1900 BCE) along paleo Saraswati in Haryana, Punjab and Rajasthan ===
Bhirrana culture is likely the oldest pre-Harappan neolithic site dating back to 7570–6200 BCE. The pottery repertoire is very rich and the diagnostic wares of this period included Mud Applique Wares, Incised (Deep and Light), Tan/Chocolate Slipped Wares, Brown-on-Buff Wares, Bichrome Wares (Paintings on the exterior with black and white pigments), Black-on-Red Ware and plain red wares.

=== Kunal culture (4000 BCE) along in Haryana, Rajasthan, Punjab, Sindh, Khyber Pakhtunkhwa ===
Kunal culture is in Hisar district of Haryana in India, has distinct i.e. local pottery and house styles. Hoard, which is a pot containing gold-leaf, silver ornaments and beads of semi-precious stones indicate contact and trade with Harappan culture. Earliest phase is dated to 4000 BC, it is older than Early-Harappan site of Rehman Dheri which was dated to 3300 BC.

The earliest site of this culture is Kunal (4000 BCE) in Haryana which is older than Rehman Dheri (3300 BCE). The type site, the first excavated site of this type of culture is Kot Diji. Rehman Dheri, which was considered oldest example of this culture, is now the second oldest example of this culture after Kunal was excavated and found to be older than Rehman Dher with similar older cultural artifacts then the Rehman Dheri.

Kot Diji and Amri are close to each other in Sindh, they earlier developed indigenous culture which had common elements, later they came in contact with Harappan culture and fully developed into Harappan culture. Earliest examples of artifacts belonging to this culture were found at Rehman Dheri, however, later excavations found the oldest example of this culture at Kunal. These are cultural ancestor to site at Harappa. These sites have pre-Harappan indigenous cultural levels, distinct from the culture of Harappa, these are at Banawali (level I), Kot Diji (level 3A), Amri (level II). Rehman Dheri also has a pre Kot Diji phase (RHD1 3300-28 BCE) which are not part of IVC culture. Kot Diji has two later phases that continue into and alongside Mature Harappan Phase (RHDII and RHDII 2500-2100 BCE). Fortified towns found here are dated as follows.

- Kunal (5000/4000 BCE–), in Hisar district of Haryana in India is the earliest site found with layers in phase I dating back to 5000 BCE and 4000 BCE, site's culture is an older ancestry of the Pre-Harappan site of Rehman Dheri which was dated to 3300 BC. A button seal was discovered at Kunal during 1998-99 excavations by Archaeological Survey of India. The seal is similar to the Rehman Dheri examples. It contained a picture of two deer on one side, and geometrical pattern on other side. The similar specimen from Rehman-Dheri is datable to c. 4000 BCE, which makes Kunal site an older ancestor of Rehman Dheri. The second phase of Kunal corresponds to post-Neolithic phase of Hakra culture (also called Early Harappan Phase, c.3300-2800 BCE or c.5000-2800 BCE) was also found.
- Kot Diji (3300 BCE), is the type site, located in Sindh in Pakistan.
- Amri (3600–3300 BCE), also has non-Harappan phases during 6000 BC to 4000 BC, and later Harappan Phases till 1300 BCE.
- Kalibangan (3500 BC – 2500 BC), in northwest Rajasthan in India on Ghaggar River.
- Rehman Dheri, 3300 BCE, near Dera Ismail Khan and close to River Zhob Valleyin Khyber Pakhtunkhwa in Pakistan.

=== Mehrgarh culture (7000 – 2500/2000 BCE) in Balochistan ===
There is no pottery in Mehrgarh Period I but evidence of pottery begins from Period II. In period III, the finds become much more abundant as the potter's wheel is introduced, and they show more intricate designs and also animal motifs. The characteristic female figurines appear beginning in Period IV and the finds show more intricate designs and sophistication. Pipal leaf designs are used in decoration from Period VI. Some sophisticated firing techniques were used from Periods VI and VII and an area reserved for the pottery industry has been found at mound MR1. However, by Period VIII, the quality and intricacy of designs seem to have suffered due to mass production, and a growing interest in bronze and copper vessels.

=== Sothi-Siswal culture (4600 – 3200 BCE) along paleo Sarasvati in Haryana and Northwestern Rajasthan ===
Sothi-Siswal is the site of a Pre-Indus Valley Civilisation settlement dating to as early as 4600 BCE. Sothi culture may be as early as 4600 BCE, while the earliest Siswal A layer is dated 3800-3200 BCE, and is equivalent to the Middle and Upper layers of Sothi. Sothi culture precedes Siswal culture considerably, and should be seen as the earlier tradition.

Sothi-Siswal culture is named after these two sites, located 70 km apart. As many as 165 sites of this culture have been reported. There are also broad similarities between Sothi-Siswal and Kot Diji ceramics. Kot Diji culture area is located just to the northwest of the Sothi-Siswal area. Type sites are Siswal in Hisar district of haryana and Sothi in Rajasthan along the Ghaggar–Chautang rivers (identified with paleo Sarasvati-Drishadvati in Vedic texts) in the Ganga–Yamuna doab, with least 165 Sothi-Siswal sites identified with this culture including Nawabans, 2 sites are bigger than 20 hectares. Sothi-Siswal ceramics are found as far south as the Ahar-Banas culture area in southeastern Rajasthan.

=== Rangpur culture (3000 – 800 BCE) in Gujarat ===
Rangpur culture, near Vanala on Saurashtra peninsula in Gujarat, lies on the tip between the Gulf of Khambhat and Gulf of Kutch, it belongs to the period of the Indus Valley Civilisation, and lies to the northwest of the larger site of Lothal. Trail Diggings were conducted by Archeological Survey of India (ASI) during 1931 led by M.S.Vats(madho svarup vats). Later, Ghurye (1939), Dikshit (1947) and S.R.Rao (1953–56) excavated the site under ASI projects. S.R.Rao has classified the deposits into four periods with three sub periods in Harappan Culture, Period II with an earlier Period, Microlithic and a Middle Paleolithic State (River sections) with points, scrapers and blades of jasper. The dates given by S.R.Rao are:

- Period I - Microliths unassociated with Pottery : 3000 BC
- Period II - Harappan : 2000–1500 BC
  - Period II B - Late Harappan : 1500–1100 BC
  - Period II C - Transition Phase of Harappa : 1100–1000 BC
- Period III - Lustrous Red Ware Period : 1000–800 BC.

=== Culture overlap with Indus Valley Civilisation ===
These cultures developed separately from IVC. All of these cultures have distinct cultural traits, such as artifacts, pottery design and patterns, which are different from the typical 3 IVC Phases. These cultures have some overlap with Indus Civilisation. These are either sites older than IVC in and around core zone of IVC where IVC cultural phases were also found; or the sites contemporaneous to IVC, usually found around the periphery of IVC core zone, which exhibit distinct cultural characteristics with some cultural overlap with IVC. Some of these had cultural contact and trade with IVC, hence the pottery found on these sites has some cultural overlap with IVC. In many cases, where these sites are within IVC core zone, pottery belonging to IVC culture has been found in the higher layers of the mound. These cultures are usually classified in the following 3 ways:

- Separate older cultures before IVC period: These pre-date the IVC and originated in a period before the Early-Harappan Phase, though in some cases there may eb overlap with Early-Harappan Phase.
- Contemporaneous to IVC with distinct cultural characteristics': With trade and cultural links to IVC, found in and around the core IVC site zone.
- Subtypes of 3 IVC phases: These cultural are classified as part of IVC but with distinct characteristics. These are classified as subtypes of 3 IVC phases by stretching the scope of IVC wider in terms of geographical range, time span, the diversity of characteristics of artifacts. For example, some of these could be classified as subtype of Early-Harappan Phase by stretching the nomenclature of this phase to "Proto-Harappan Phase" or "Pre-Harappan Phase" by widening the time span of this phase. Depending on the contemporaneous period, some of these cultures are also classified as subtypes of Mature-Harappan or Late-Harappan Phase.

Cultures which were contemporaneous with the "Early Harappan Phase" (3300-2600 BCE) were the Ahar–Banas, Amri-Nal, Damb-Sadat, Kot Diji and Sothi-Siswal cultures. Harappa is its type site of this phase of IVC, which also had an early phase dating to 3500 BCE. IVC sites of this phase were village communities engaged in agricultural and domestication of animals, and specialised crafts. It late evolved into urbanised Mature Harappan Phase. Cultures which were contemporaneous with the "Mature Harappan Phase" (2600-1900 BCE) are Bara, Kunal, Rangpur cultures some of these pre-date IVC (Early-Harappan) culture.

== Indus Valley Civilisation (3300 – 1300 BCE) ==
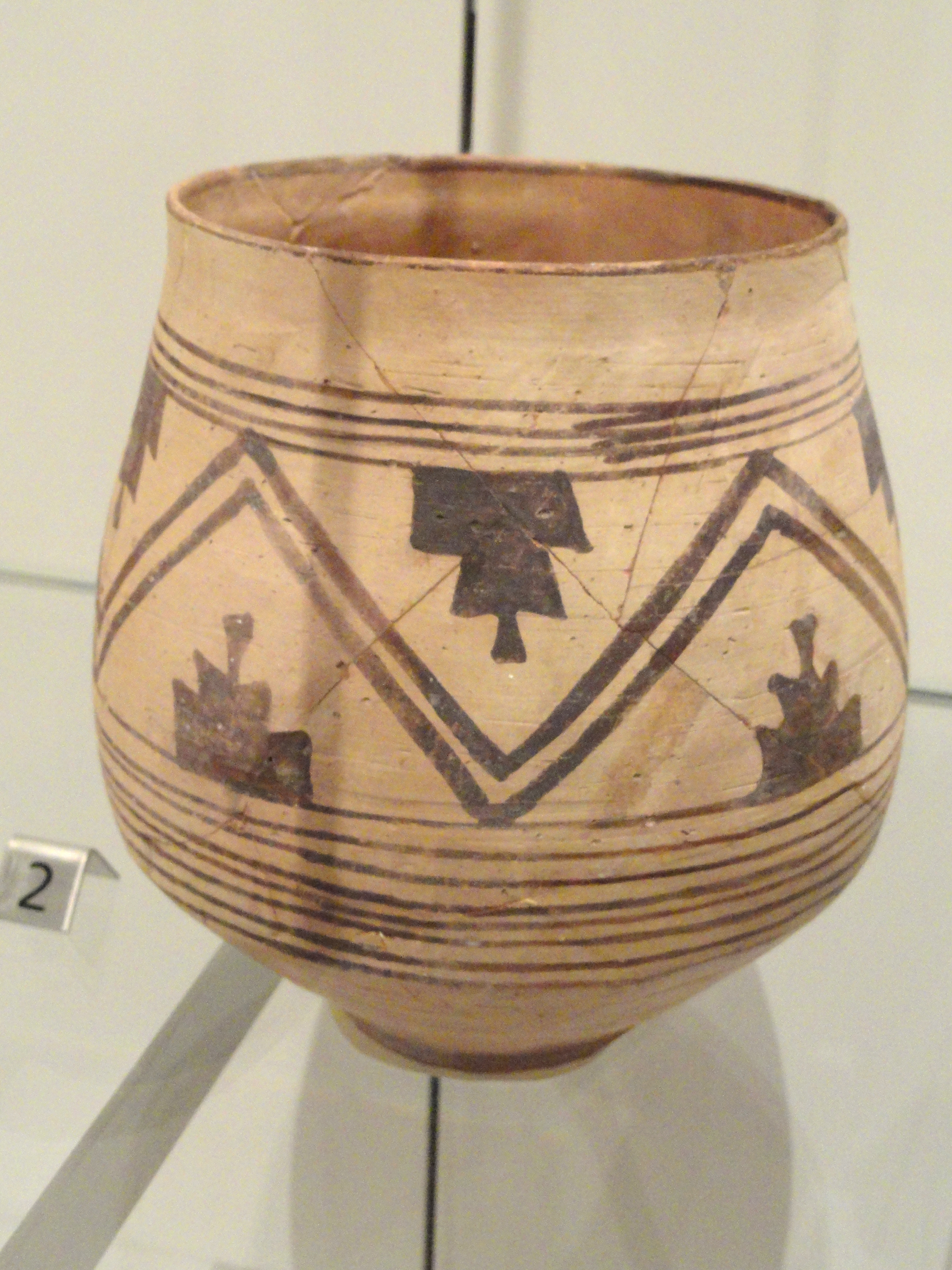
Indus Valley Civilisation pot from Harappan phase found at Quetta in Baluchistan, c. 2500-1900 BCE.

The Indus Valley Civilisation has an ancient tradition of pottery making. Though the origin of pottery in India can be traced back to the much earlier Mesolithic age, with coarse handmade pottery - bowls, jars, vessels - in various colours such as red, orange, brown, black and cream. During the Indus Civilisation, there is proof of pottery being constructed in two ways, handmade and wheel-made.

=== Early Harappan Phase (3300 – 2600 BCE) ===
==== Damb-Sadat culture (3500 BCE) in Iranian and Pakistani Balochistan ====
Damb-Sadat culture: Based on the pottery found here, it is classified as a separate archaeological culture / subculture of Indus Valley Civilisation.

==== Kot Diji (3300 BCE) in Sindh ====
Kot Diji: Site in Sindh is dated to 3300 BCE.

=== Mature Harappan Phase (2600 – 1900 BCE) ===
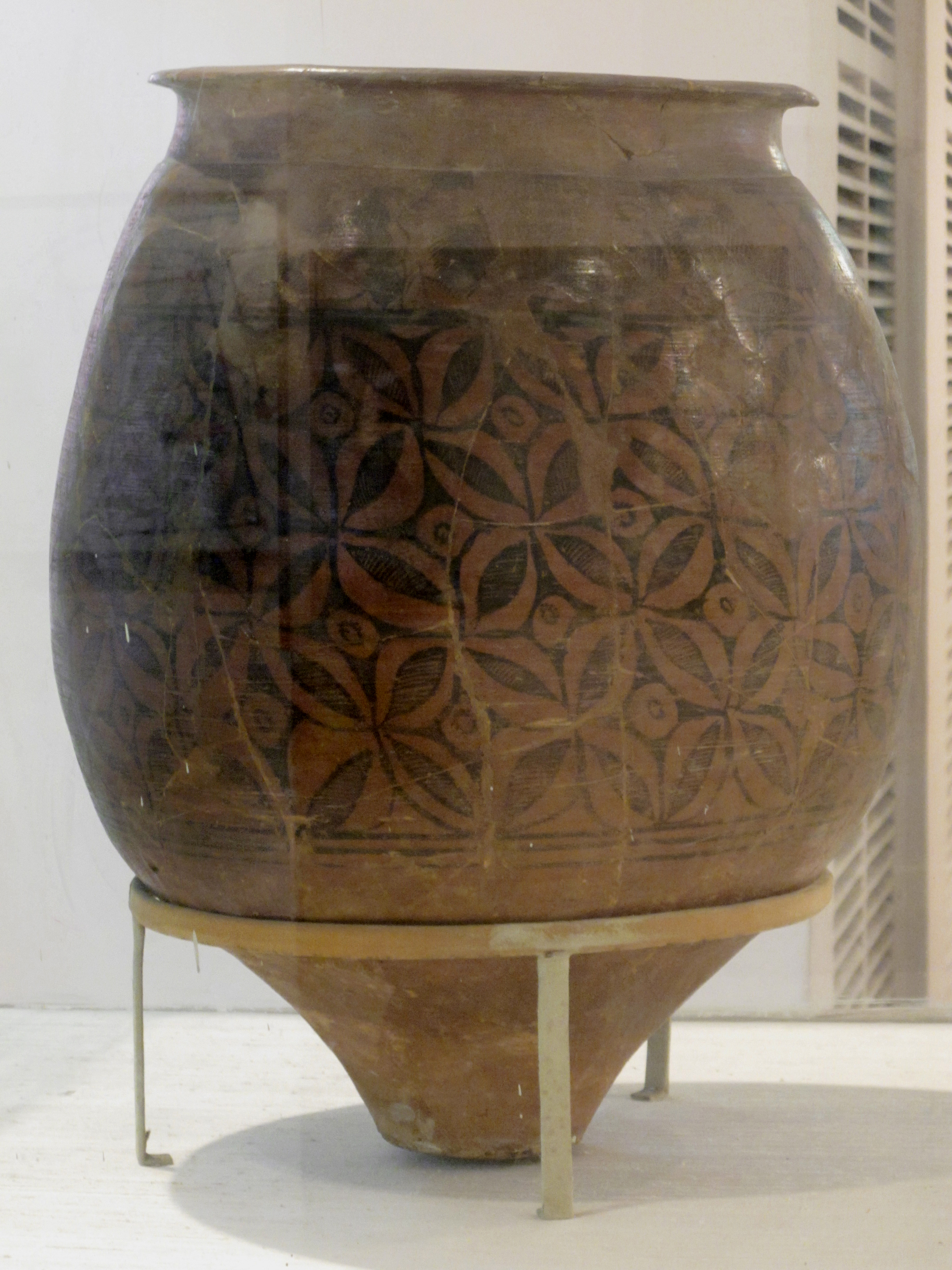
A storage jar from the Mature Harappan period at the National Museum, New Delhi, c. 2700-2000 BCE

The type site is Harappa. This phase has been found at numerous other sites, all of which have earlier much older indigenous cultural phases, example of those sites include Birrana, Rakhigarhi, Kunal, Siswal in Haryana in India; Sothi in Rajasthan in India; Mehrgarh and Amri in Pakistan.

=== Late Harappan Phase (1900 – 1300 BCE) ===
Cemetery H culture in Punjab and Jhukar and Jhangar culture in Sindh flourished during this phase. Rangpur culture in Gujarat India was also contemporaneous with this phase of IVC, which had distinct cultural characteristics, and traded with IVC cultures.

==== Bara culture (2000 BCE) in Shivalik foothills of Punjab, Haryana and Western Uttar Pradesh ====
Bara culture: Dated to 2000 BCE in doab between Yamuna and Sutlej rivers near Shivalik ranges of lower Himalayas, this cultures area corresponds to modern-day Punjab, Haryana and Western Uttar Pradesh in North India.

==== Cemetery H culture (1900 – 1300 BCE) ====
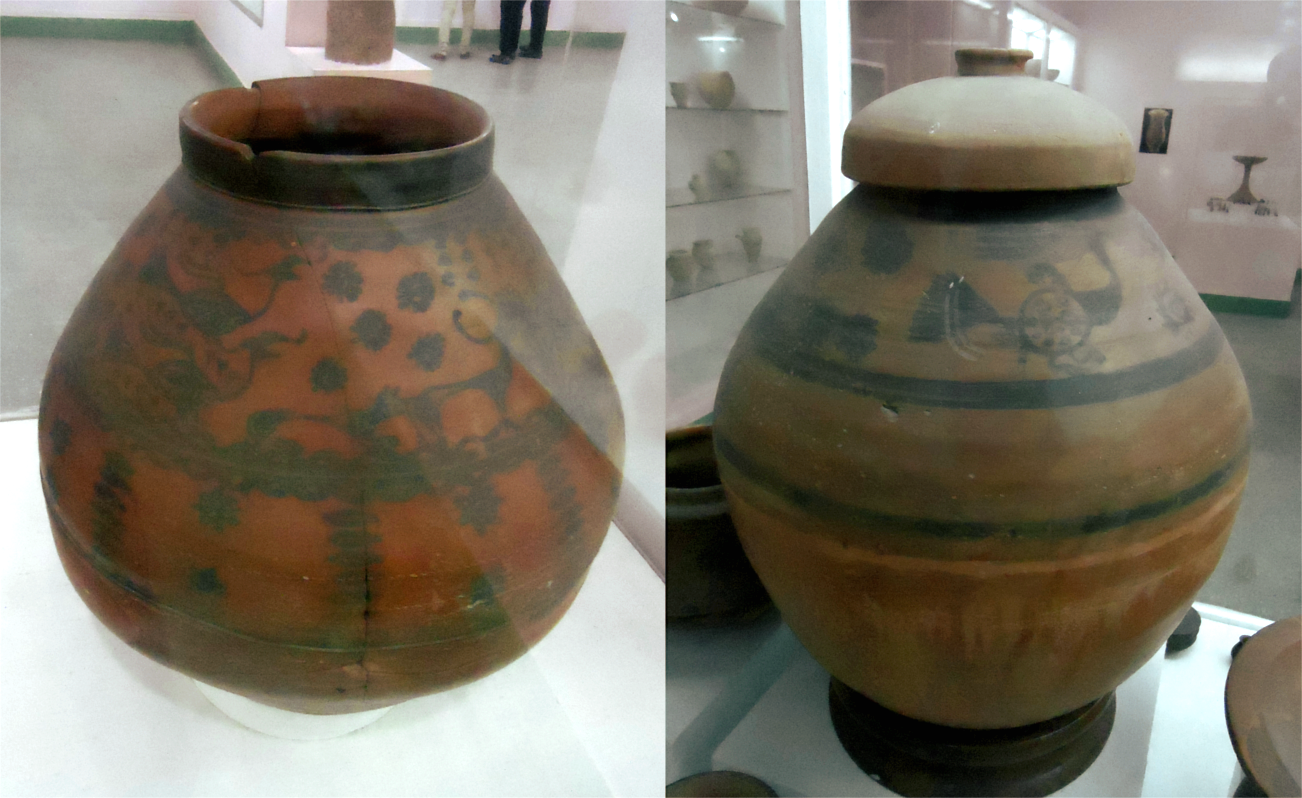
Painted pottery urns from Harappa, Cemetery H culture, c. 1900-1300 BCE.

Cemetery H culture was a Bronze Age cultural regional form in the Punjab region and north-western India, from about 1900 BCE until about 1300 BCE, of the late phase of the Harappan (Indus Valley) civilisation (alongside the Jhukar culture of Sindh and Rangpur culture of Gujarat), and it has also been connected with the early stages of the Indo-Aryan migrations. It was named after a cemetery found in "area H" at Harappa. According to Kenoyer, the Cemetery H culture "may only reflect a change in the focus of settlement organization from that which was the pattern of the earlier Harappan phase and not cultural discontinuity, urban decay, invading aliens, or site abandonment, all of which have been suggested in the past."

==== Jhukar and Jhangar culture (1900 – 1300 BCE) ====
Jhukar Phase was a Late Bronze Age culture that existed in the lower Indus Valley, i.e. Sindh, during the 2nd millennium BC. Named after the archaeological type site Jhukar in Sindh, it was a regional form of the Late Harappan culture, following the mature, urban phase of the civilization.

Jhukar phase was followed by the Jhangar Phase, which is a non-urban culture, characterised by "crude handmade pottery" and "campsites of a population which was nomadic and mainly pastoralist," and is dated to approximately the late second millennium BCE and early first millennium BCE. In Sindh, urban growth began again after approximately 500 BCE.

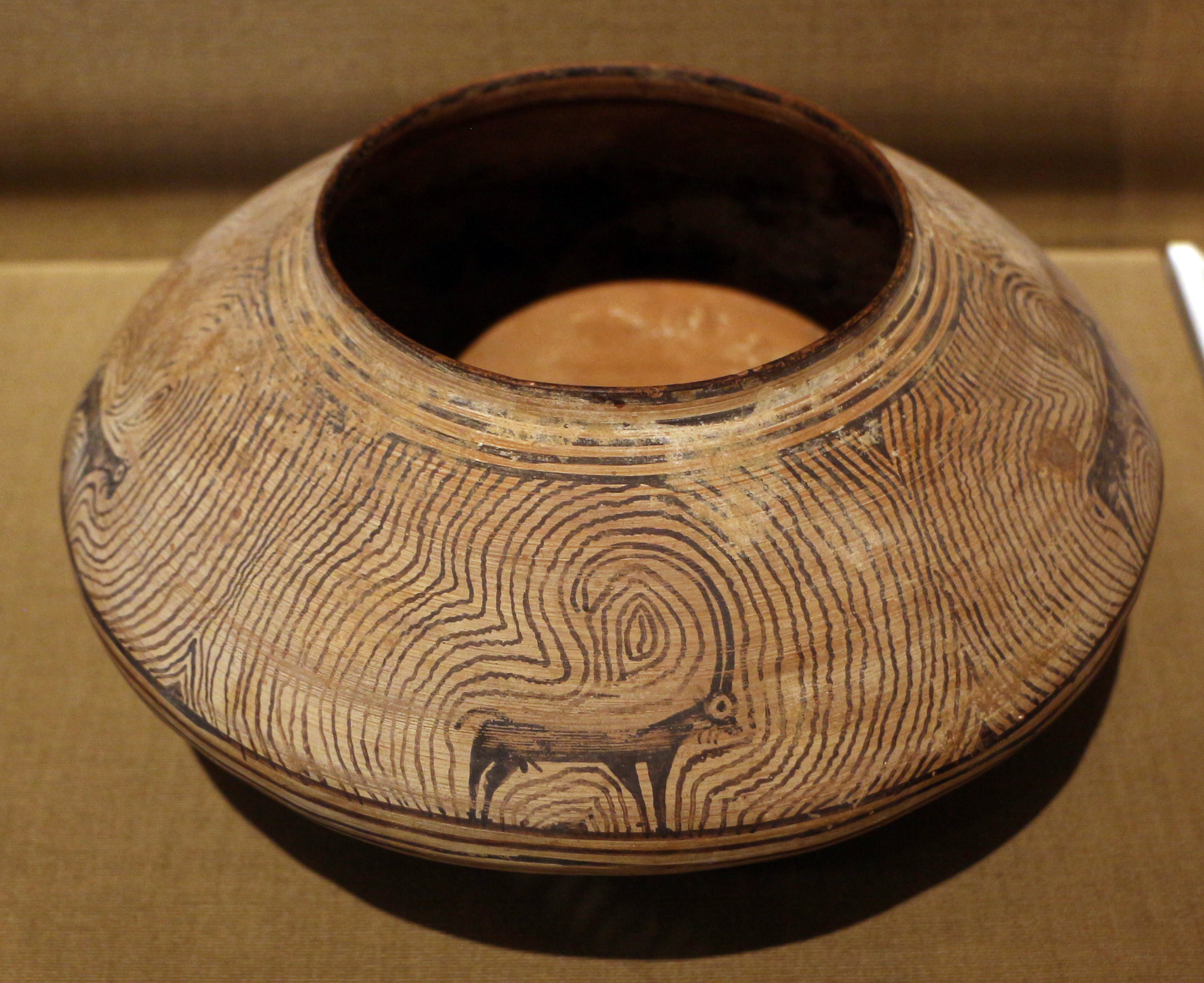
Jar with four ibex, possibly from Quetta valley, 2800–2500 BC

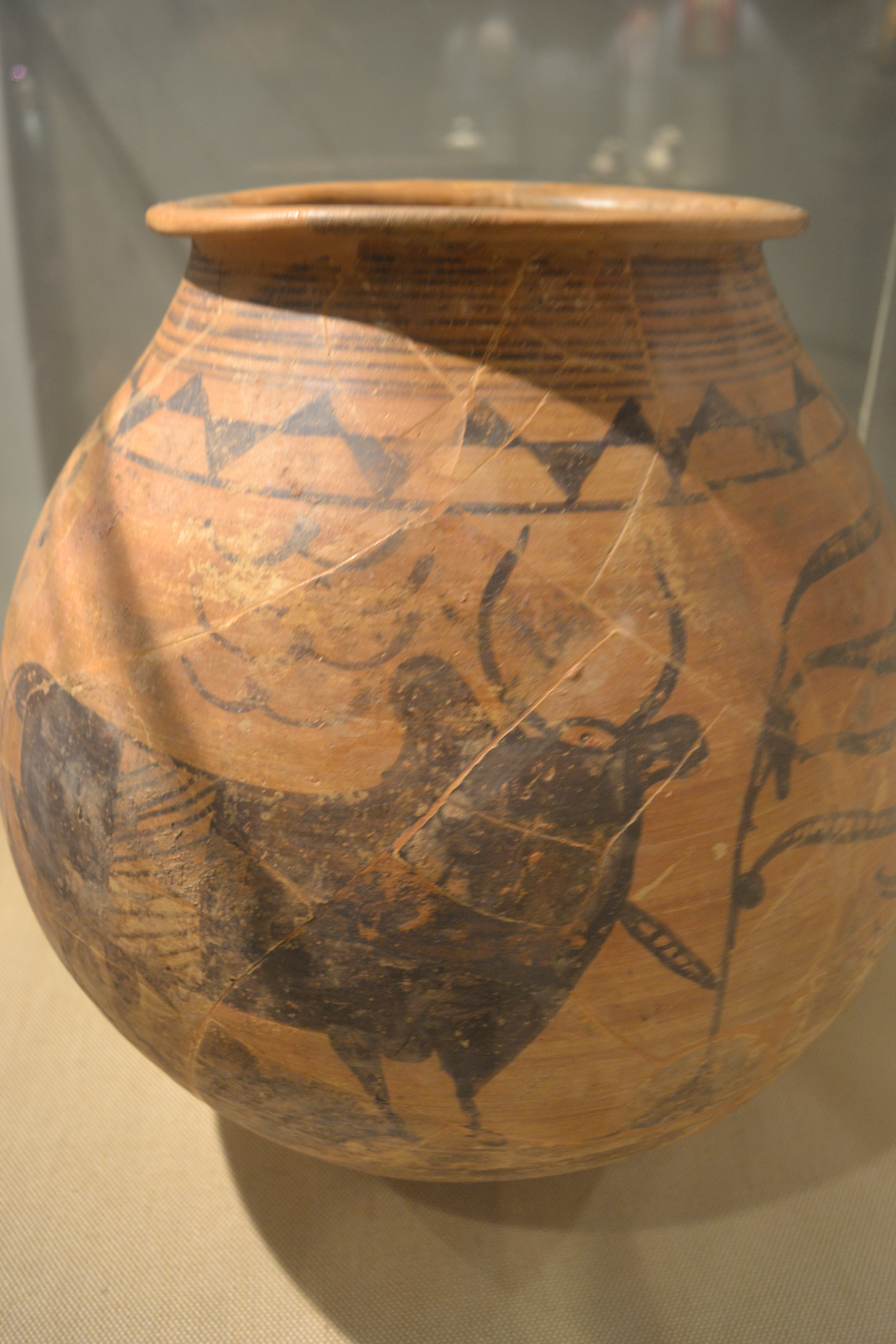
Jar found in Naushahro, 2700–1800 BC

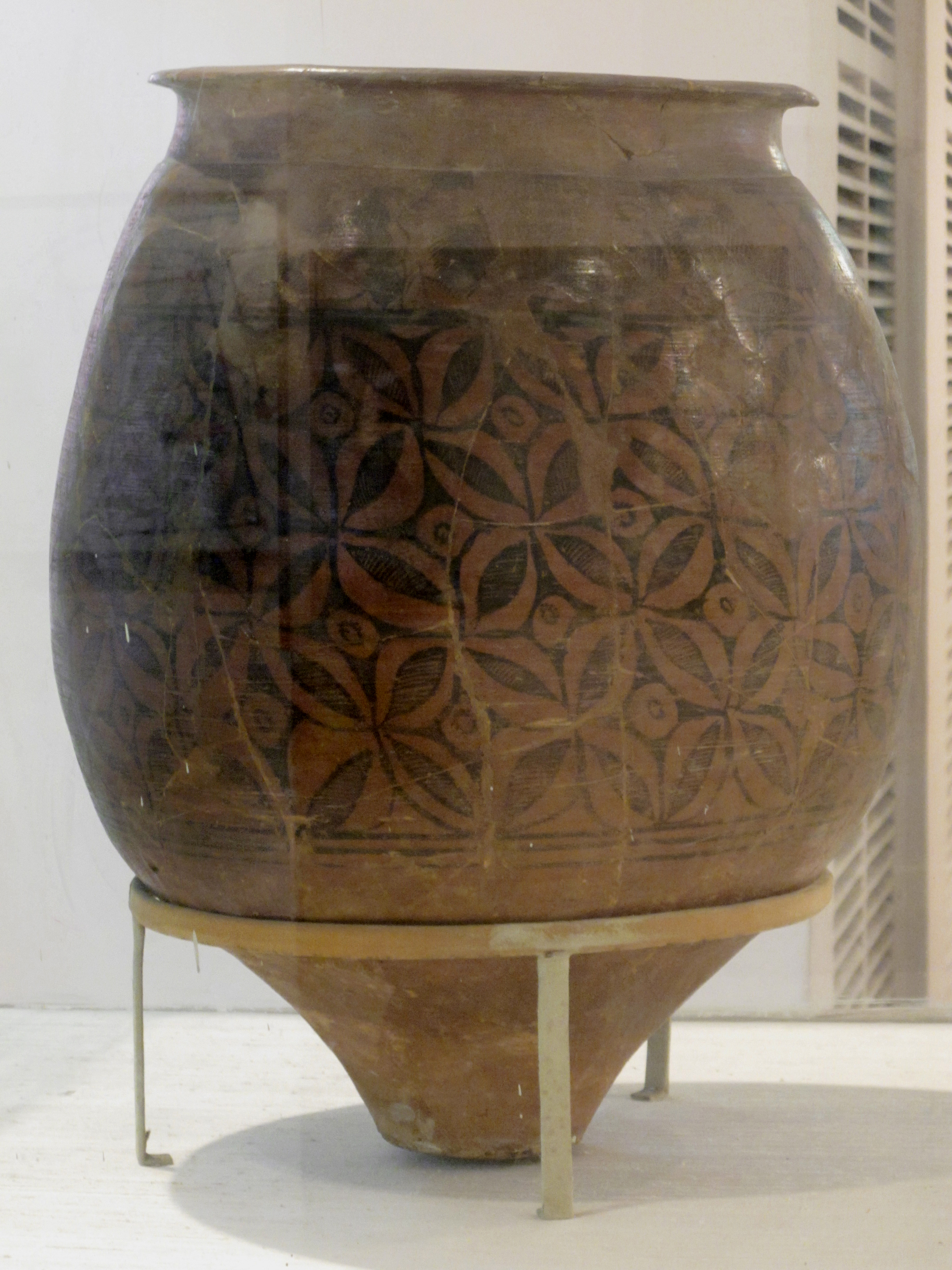
Storage jar, Mature Harappan period, Chanhudaro, c.2700–2000 BC

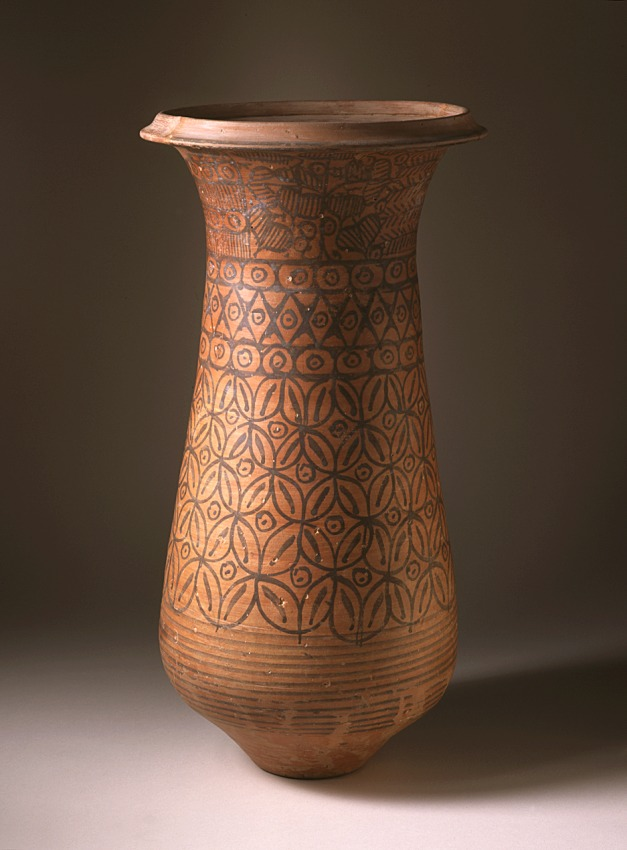
Indus Valley Civilisation, Harappan, Southern Pakistan, c. 2600–2450 BC

== Vedic period (1500 – 500 BCE) in North Indian subcontinent ==
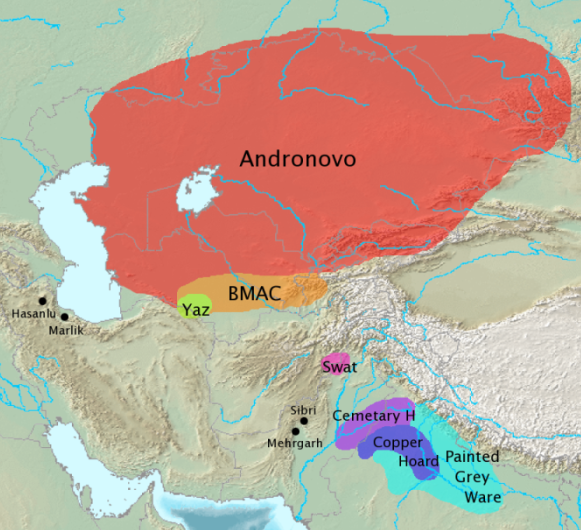
Archaeological cultures associated with Indo-Iranian migrations (after EIEC). The Andronovo, BMAC and Yaz cultures have often been associated with Indo-Iranian migrations. The GGC, Cemetery H, Copper Hoard and PGW cultures are candidates for cultures associated with Indo-Aryan movements.

Together with the Gandhara grave culture and the Ochre Coloured Pottery culture, the Cemetery H culture is considered by some scholars as a factor in the formation of the Vedic civilisation.

Wilhelm Rau (1972) has examined the references to pottery in Vedic texts like the Black Yajur Veda and the Taittiriya Samhita. According to his study, Vedic pottery is for example hand-made and unpainted. According to Kuzmina (1983), Vedic pottery that matches Rau's description cannot be found in Asia Minor and Central Asia, though the pottery of Andronovo culture is similar in some respects.

=== Ochre Coloured Pottery culture (2000 – 1500 BCE) in Eastern Punjab, Western UP and Rajasthan ===
Ochre Coloured Pottery culture (OCP) is a 2nd millennium BC Bronze Age culture of the Indo-Gangetic Plain, extending from eastern Punjab to northeastern Rajasthan and western Uttar Pradesh. It is considered a candidate for association with the early Indo-Aryan or Vedic culture. Early specimens of the characteristic ceramics found near Jodhpura, Rajasthan, date from the 3rd millennium (this Jodhpura is located in the district of Jaipur and should not be confused with the city of Jodhpur). Several sites of culture flourish along the banks of Sahibi River and its tributaries such as Krishnavati river and Soti river, all originating from the Aravalli Range and flowing from south to north-east direction towards Yamuna before disappearing in Mahendragarh district of Haryana.

The culture reached the Gangetic plain in the early 2nd millennium. Recently, the Archaeological Survey of India discovered copper axes and some pieces of pottery in its excavation at the Saharanpur district of Uttar Pradesh. The Ochre Coloured Pottery culture has the potential to be called a proper civilisation (e.g., the North Indian Ochre civilisation) like the Harrapan civilisation, but is termed only as a culture pending further discoveries.

=== Copper Hoard Culture (2800 – 1500 BCE) in Delhi and Uttar Pradesh ===
Copper Hoard culture occur in the northern part of India mostly in hoards large and small and are believed to date to the later 2nd millennium BCE, although very few derive from controlled and dateable excavation contexts. The doab hoards are associated with the so-called Ochre Coloured Pottery (OCP) which appears to be closely associated with the Late Harappan (or Posturban) phase. These hoard artefacts are a main manifestation of the archaeology of India during the metals age, of which many are deposited in the "Kanya Gurukul museum" in Narela and Haryana.

=== Gandhara grave culture (1500 – 500 BCE) in Afghanistan and Northwest Pakistan ===
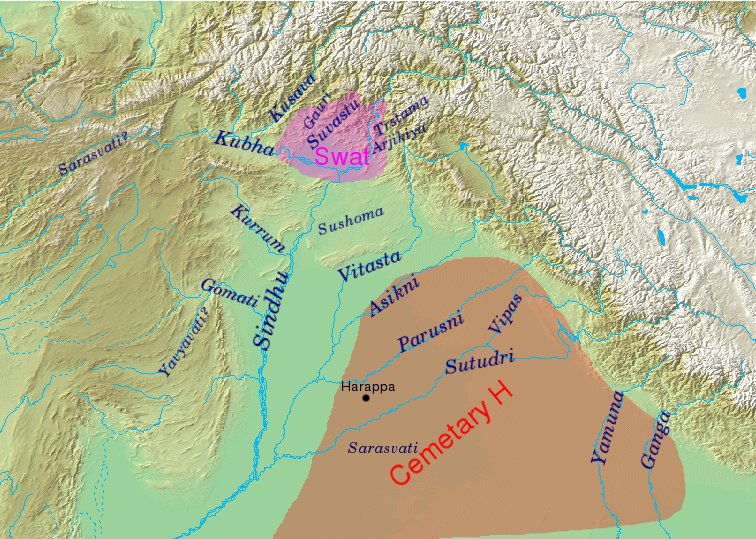
Geography of the Rigveda, with river names; the extent of the Swat and Cemetery H cultures are indicated.

Gandhara grave culture, also called Swat culture, emerged c. 1600 BC, and flourished c. 1500 BC to 500 BC in Gandhara, which lies in modern-day Pakistan and Afghanistan. It may be associated with early Indo-Aryan speakers as well as the Indo-Aryan migrations into the Indian subcontinent, which came from the Bactria–Margiana region. According to Kochhar, the Indo-Aryan culture fused with indigenous elements of the remnants of the Indus Valley Civilisation (OCP, Cemetery H) and gave rise to the Vedic Civilisation.

=== Black and red ware culture (1450 – 1200 BCE) in northern and central Indian subcontinent ===
Black and red ware culture (BRW) is a late Bronze Age and early Iron Age archaeological culture of the northern and central Indian subcontinent, associated with the Vedic civilisation. In the Western Ganges plain (western Uttar Pradesh) it is dated to c. 1450-1200 BCE, and is succeeded by the Painted Grey Ware culture; whereas in the Central and Eastern Ganges plain (eastern Uttar Pradesh, Bihar, and Bengal) and Central India (Madhya Pradesh) the BRW appears during the same period but continues for longer, until c. 700-500 BCE, when it is succeeded by the Northern Black Polished Ware culture. In the Western Ganges plain, the BRW was preceded by the Ochre Coloured Pottery culture. The BRW sites were characterized by subsistence agriculture (cultivation of rice, barley, and legumes), and yielded some ornaments made of shell, copper, carnelian, and terracotta. In some sites, particularly in eastern Punjab and Gujarat, BRW pottery is associated with Late Harappan pottery, and according to some scholars like Tribhuan N. Roy, the BRW may have directly influenced the Painted Grey Ware and Northern Black Polished Ware cultures.

=== Painted Grey Ware (1200 – 600 BCE) in Western Uttar Pradesh, Haryana, Eastern Punjab ===
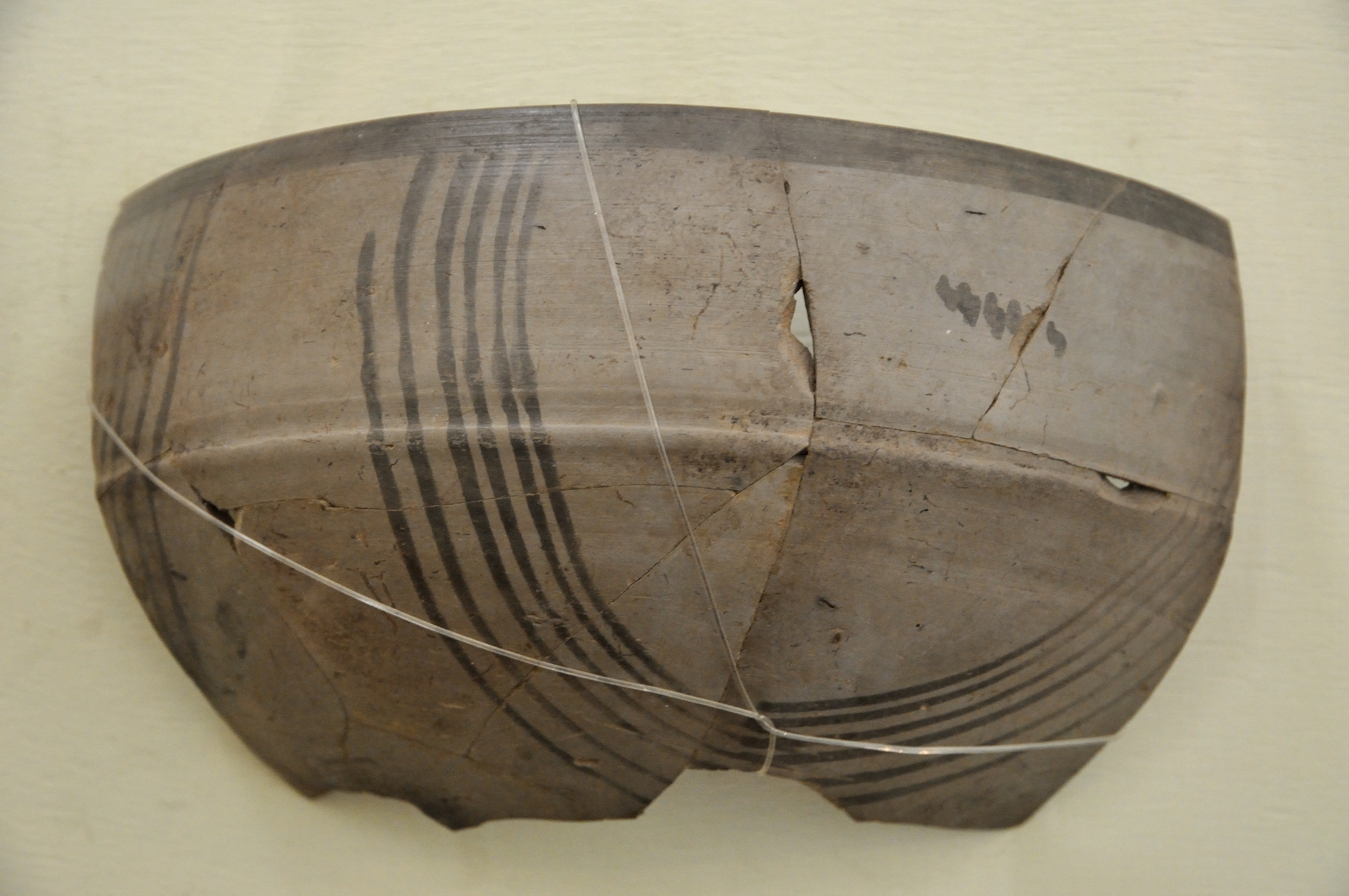
PWG, Sonkh, Mathura, c. 1000-600 BCE.

The Painted Grey Ware (PWG) culture is an Iron Age culture of the western Gangetic plain and the Ghaggar-Hakra valley, lasting from roughly 1200 BCE to 600 BCE, which probably corresponds to the middle and late Vedic period, i.e., the Kuru-Panchala kingdom, the first large state in South Asia after the decline of the Indus Valley Civilisation. It is a successor of the Black and red ware culture (BRW) within this region, and contemporary with the continuation of the BRW culture in the eastern Gangetic plain and Central India.

=== Northern Black Polished Ware (700 – 200 BCE) in Northern India ===
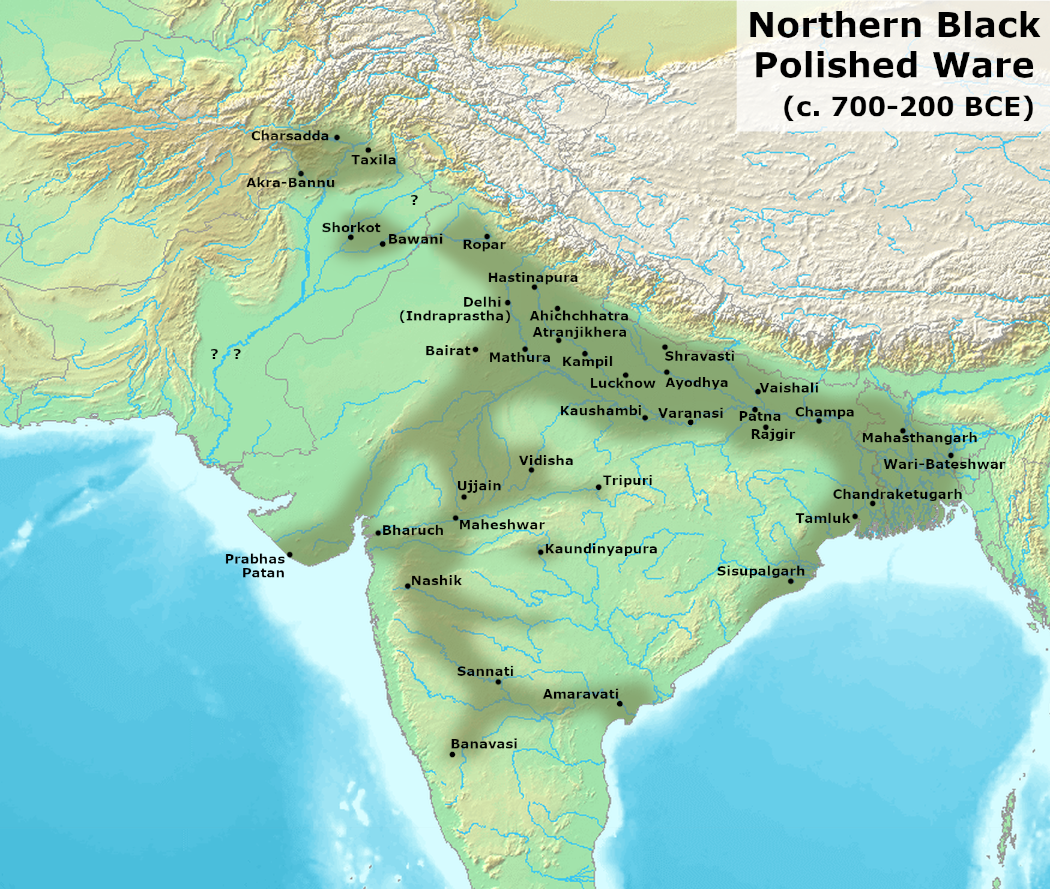
Map of some NBPW sites.

Northern Black Polished Ware (abbreviated NBPW or NBP) is an urban Iron Age culture of the Indian subcontinent, lasting c. 700–200 BCE, succeeding the Painted Grey Ware culture and Black and red ware culture. It developed beginning around 700 BC, in the late Vedic period, and peaked from c. 500–300 BC, coinciding with the emergence of 16 great states or mahajanapadas in Northern India, and the subsequent rise of the Mauryan Empire. (Note: After recent excavations at Gotihwa in Nepal, archaeologist Giovanni Verardi by radiocarbon datings says that proto-NBPW is at least from 900 BC. Excavations in India at Ayodhya, Juafardih near Nalanda, and Kolhua near Vaisali, show even earlier radiocarbon datings around 1200 BC. Based on this, historian Carlos Aramayo proposes the following chronology: Proto-NBPW (1200–800 BC); Early NBPW (800–300 BC); and Late NBPW (300–100 BC).)

=== Contemporaneous to Vedic period ===
==== Red Polished Ware of Gujarat (300 BCE – 1000 CE) in Gujarat, West and North India ====
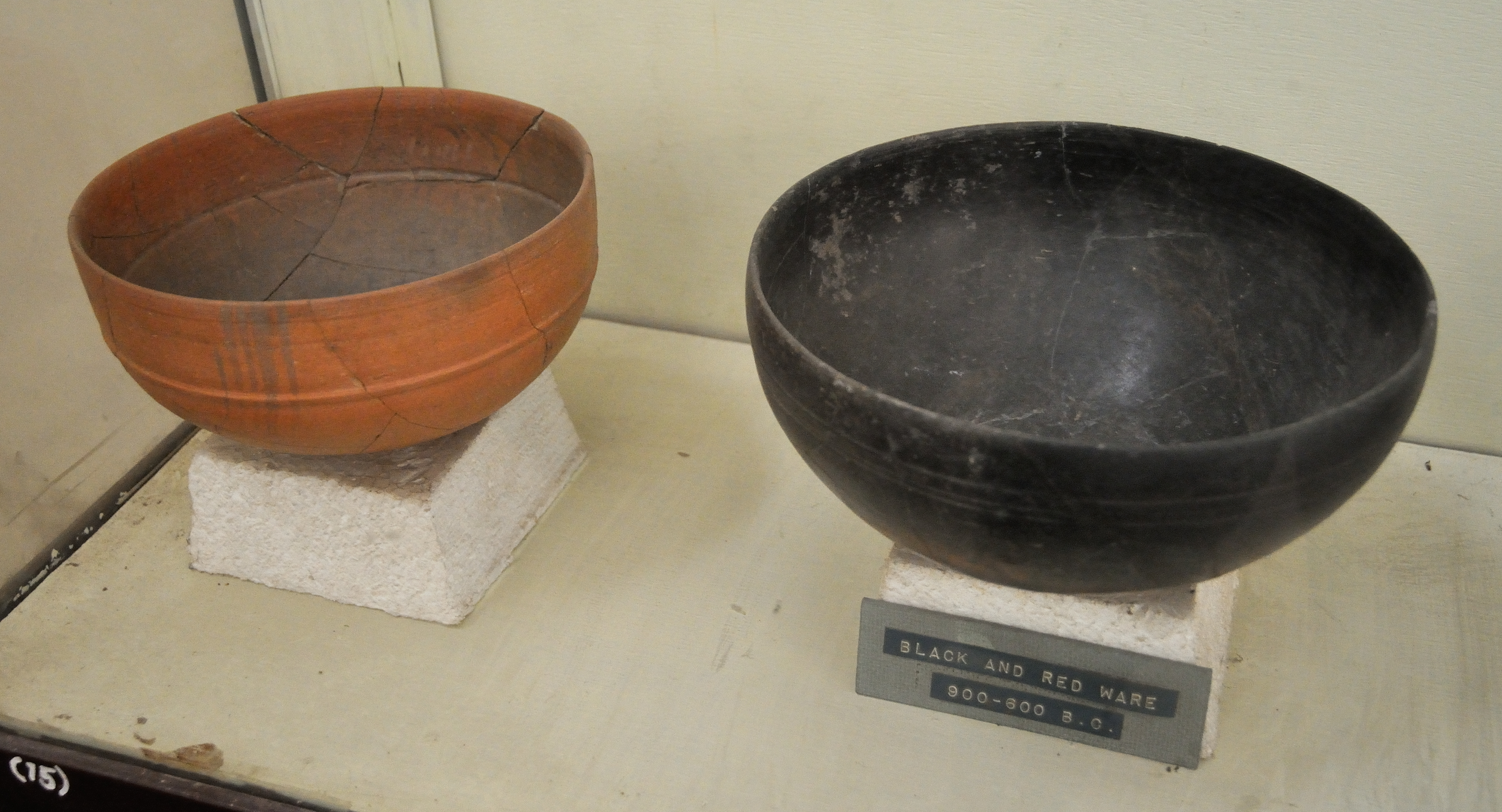
Black and Red Ware, Sonkh, Uttar Pradesh. Government Museum, Mathura.

The Red Polished Ware (RPW) is found in great quantities in Gujarat, especially in the Kathiawar region. Commonly, it consist of domestic forms like cooking pots, and it dates started from 300 BCE and lasted till 1000 CE.

But this type of ware also is widely distributed in other places in India. It is found at Baroda, Timberva (Surat), Vadnagar, Vala, Prabhas, Sutrapada, Bhandaria, and many other places. The use of this pottery continued for many centuries.

Early on, the scholars considered this pottery as a diagnostic marker for ‘Indo-Roman trade’, showing the possibility of the Roman influence. Also, this type of pottery was identified at sites bordering the Persian Gulf, so it became significant for the research on the Indian Ocean trade.

Red Polished Ware was first identified in 1953 by B. Subbarao. According to him, a "high degree of finish led to consider it as an imported ware or at least an imitation of the Roman Samian Ware".

But in 1966 S. R. Rao in his report on Amreli rejected this possibility of a Roman influence. He insisted on an indigenous origin as none of the forms shared the shapes of Roman prototype. He presented a broad variety of vessel types consisting of clay suitable to that definition. Instead he referred to a similarity of vessels of Black Ware with polished surface [Black Polished ware] from the same site noted in layers beyond the first occurrence of RPW.

According to Heidrun Schenk, the pottery defined as RPW consists of two very distinct functional groups. Thus, the subject needs more precise classification and dating.

One group belongs to the local pottery development of a region around Gujarat—mostly domestic vessels like cooking pots. The core area of this group is western India, but it is also distributed elsewhere on the western littoral of the Indian Ocean.

The other group are the very specialized types of the 'sprinkler' and 'spouted' water jars, that often go together. This special group is widely found in the eastern region of the Indian Ocean, throughout the South Asian subcontinent and South East Asia with many different fabrics. This group represents a later development continuing well into the Middle Ages.

In particular, in Tissamaharama, in the Southern Province of Sri Lanka, a good stratigraphy is found.

Early Red Polished Ware is often associated with the Northern Black Polished ware (NBP), and goes back to 3rd century BC.

Red Polished Ware has also been found in Kushan (30-375 CE), Gupta (4th to early 6th century CE) and Vardhan period (Pushyabhuti dynasty, early 6th century to 7th century CE) in North India, one such example is Harsh Ka Tila in Haryana.

==== Malwa culture (1600 BCE – 1300 CE) in Madhya Pradesh and north Maharashtra ====
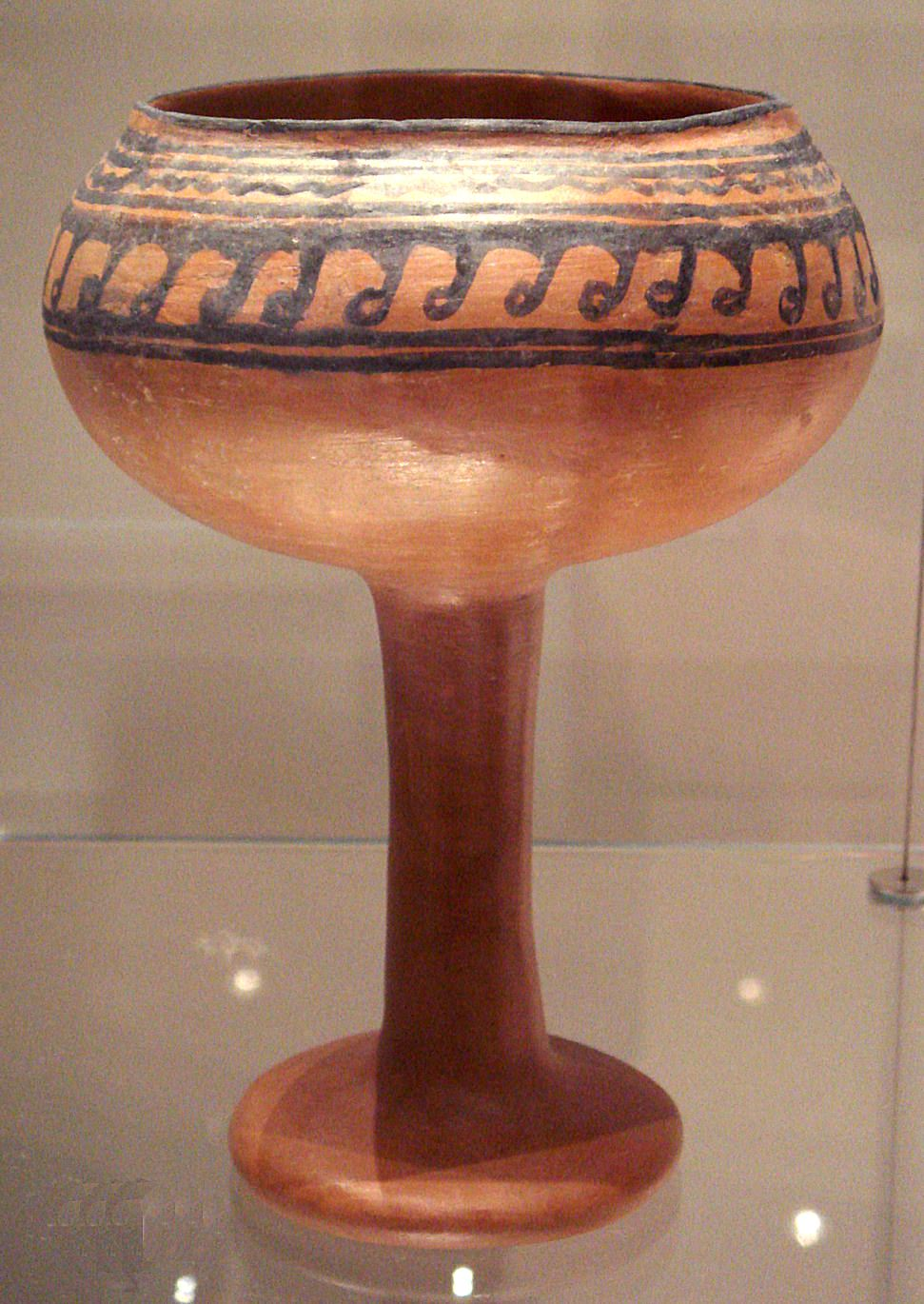
Ceramic goblet from Navdatoli, Malwa, 1300 BCE

Malwa culture was a Chalcolithic archaeological culture which existed in the Malwa region of Central India and parts of Maharashtra in the Deccan Peninsula. It is mainly dated to c. 1600 – c. 1300 BCE, but calibrated radiocarbon dates have suggested that the beginning of this culture may be as early as c. 2000-1750 BCE. the unique aspect of the Malwa culture is they do not use potter's wheel instead the whole process is done by hand.

==== Jorwe culture (1000 – 700 BCE) in Maharashtra ====
Jorwe culture was a Chalcolithic archaeological culture which existed in large areas of what is now Maharashtra state in Western India, and also reached north into the Malwa region of Madhya Pradesh. It is named after the type site of Jorwe. The early phase of the culture is dated to c. 1400-1000 BCE, while the late phase is dated to c. 1000-700 BCE.

== Classical Age Pottery and Cultures (c. 500 BCE to 1000 CE) ==
=== Rang Mahal culture (1st – 7th century CE) on paleo Sarasvati in Haryana, Eastern Punjab and Northwest Rajasthan ===
Rang Mahal culture, a post-Vedic culture, is a collection of more than 124 sites spread across Sriganganagar, Suratgarh, Sikar, Alwar and Jhunjhunu districts along the palaeochannel of Ghaggar-Hakra River (Sarasvati-Drishadvati rivers) dating to Kushan (1st to 3rd CE) and Gupta (4th to 7th CE) period, is named after the first archaeological Theris excavated by the Swedish scientists at Rang Mahal village which is famous for the terracota of the early gupta period excavated from the ancient theris in the village. The Rang Mahal culture is famed for the beautifully painted vases on red surface with floral, animal, bird and geometric designs painted in black.

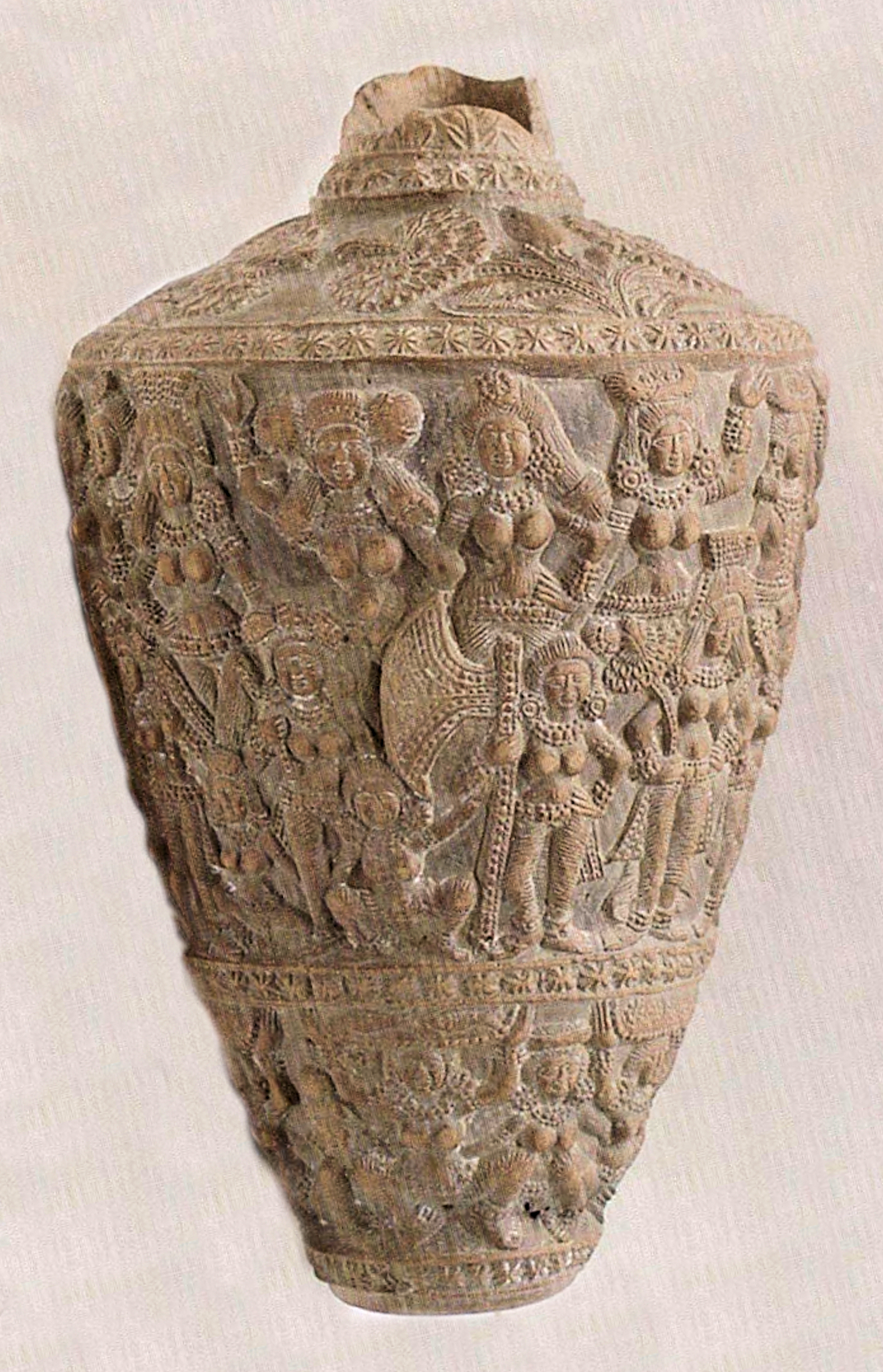
Pottery with narrative panels, 100 BC, West Bengal.

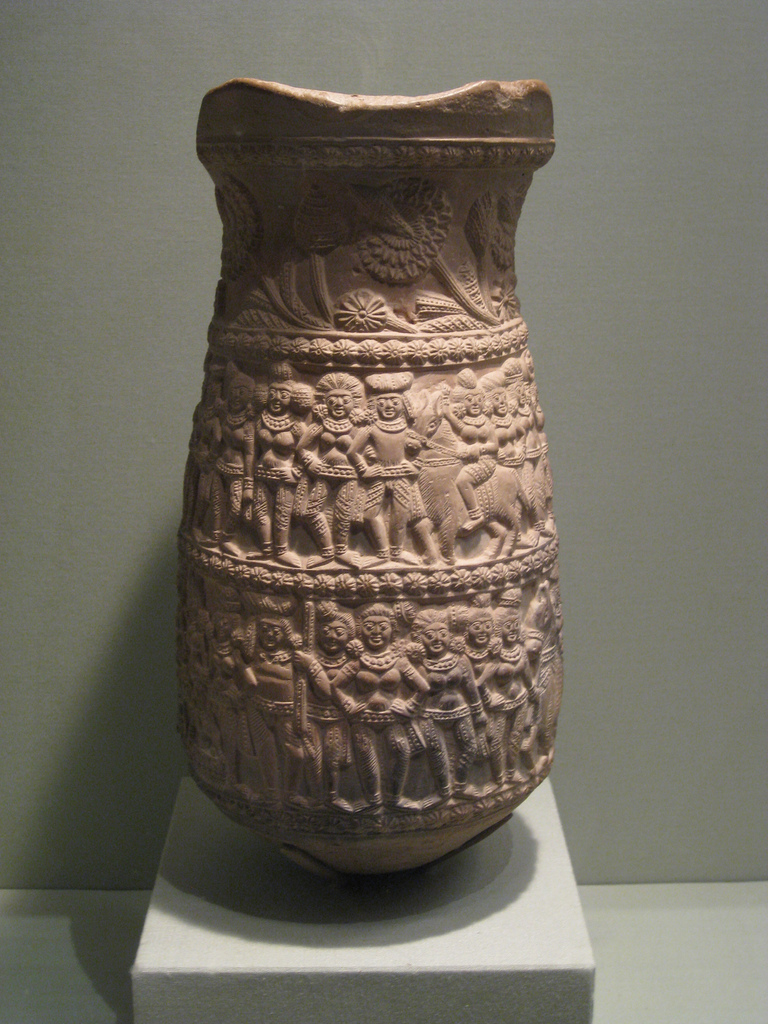
Vase with Processional Scenes ca 100 BC, West Bengal

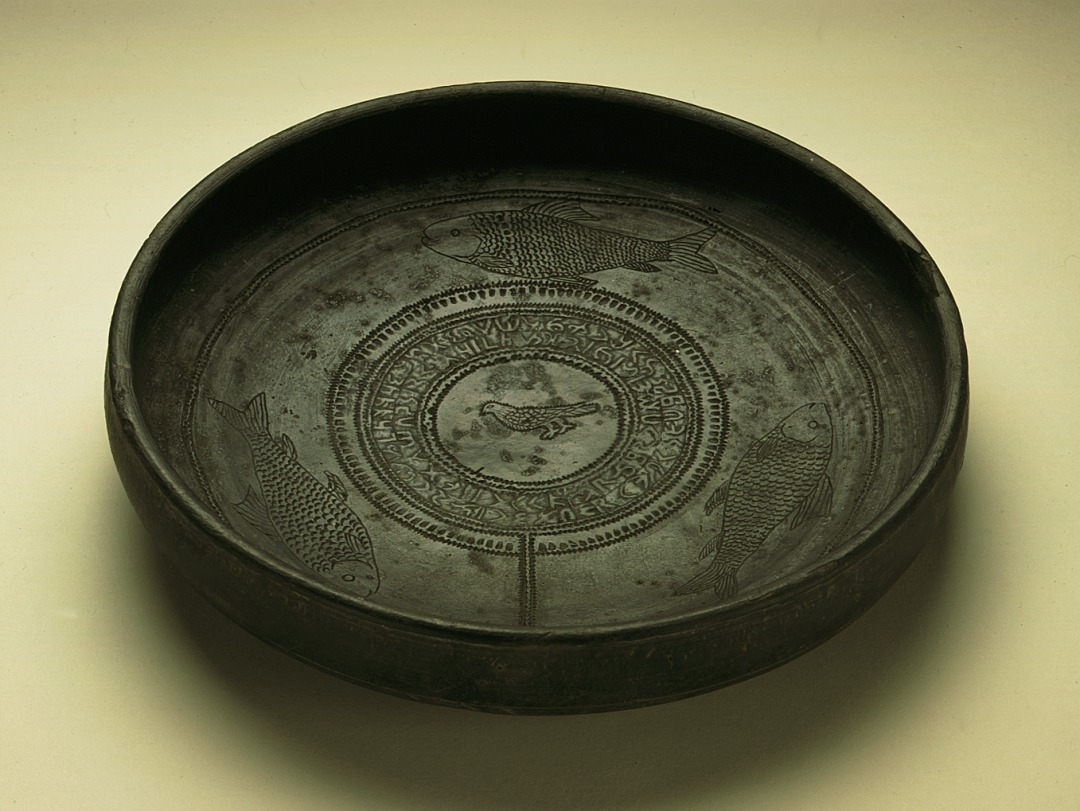
Dish with inscription, ca. 1st century BC - 1st century AD, West Bengal.

== Medieval Age Pottery and Cultures (c. 13th to 18th century) ==
The phase of glazed pottery started in the 13th century CE, when Turkic rulers encouraged potters from Persia, Central Asia and elsewhere to settle in present-day Northern India. Glazed pottery of Persian models with Indian designs, dating back to the Sultanate period, has been found in Gujarat and Maharashtra.

Current era Blue Pottery of Jaipur is widely recognized as a traditional craft of Jaipur.

== Styles ==
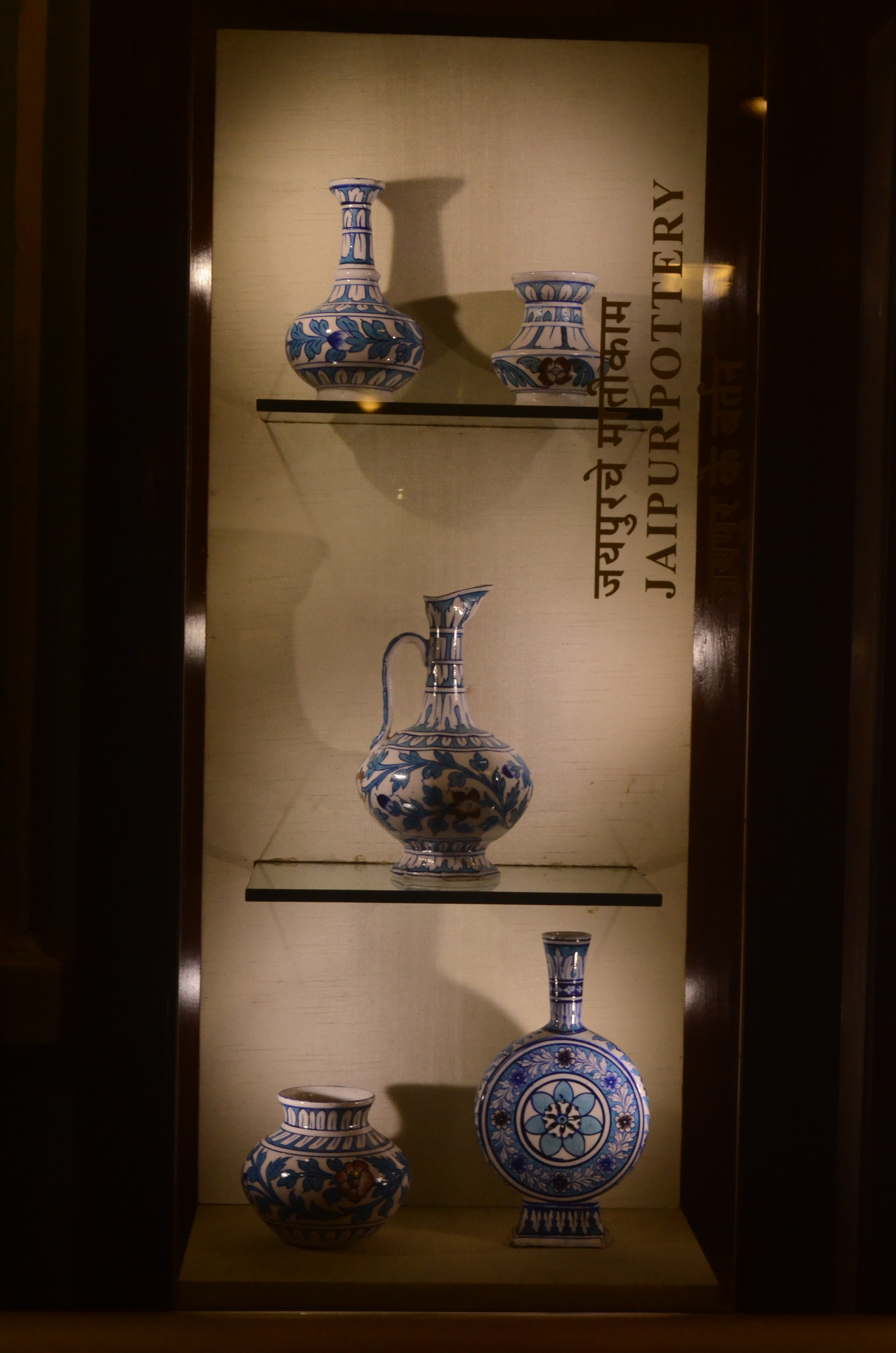
Glazed Jaipur Blue pottery, Daji Lad Museum, Mumbai, India.

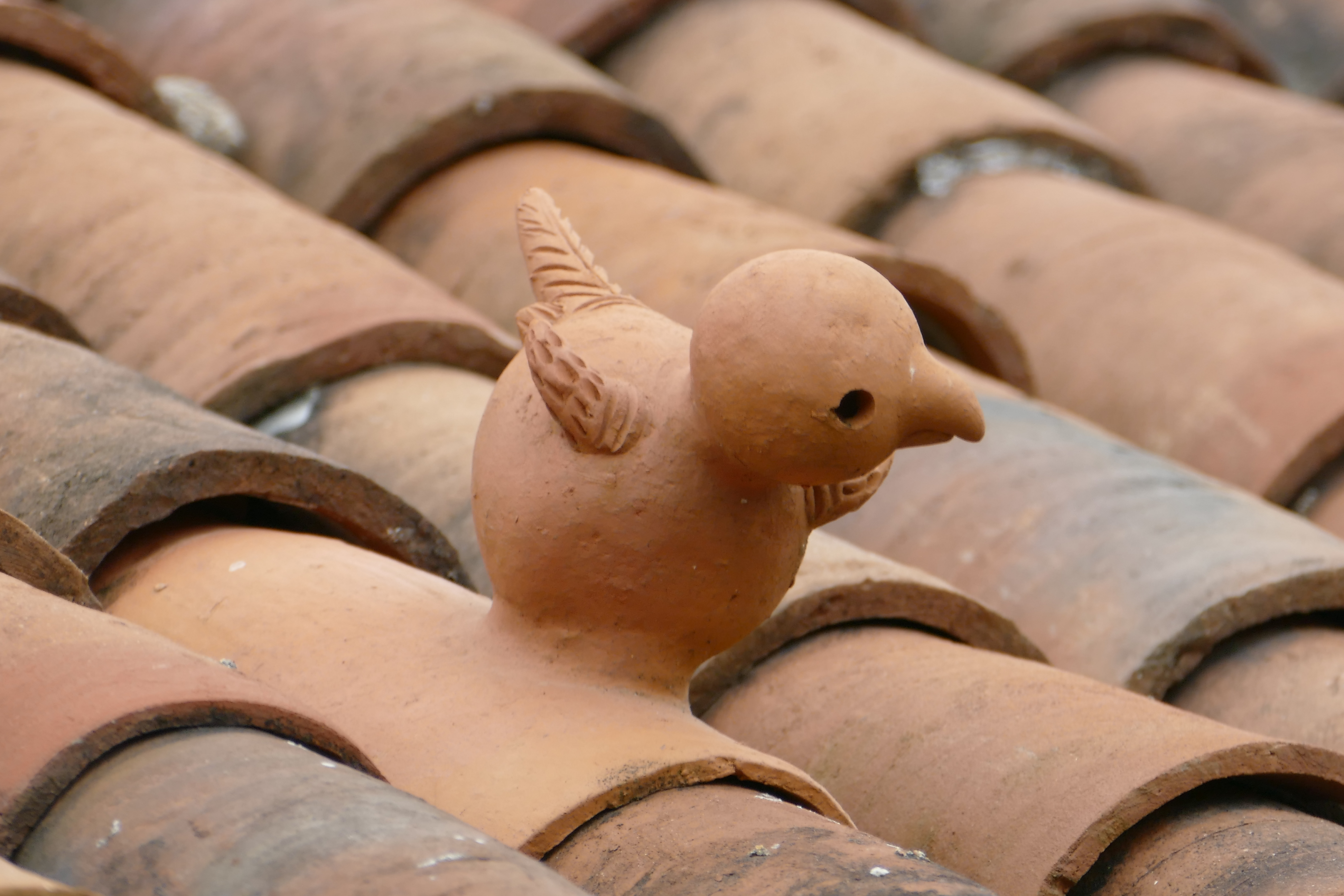
Barpali roof-tiles with terracotta sculptures.

Over time India's simple style of molding clay went into an evolution. A number of distinct styles emerged from this simple style. Some of the most popular forms of pottery include unglazed pottery, glazed pottery, terracotta, and papier-mache.

=== Unglazed pottery ===
Unglazed pottery, the oldest form of pottery practiced in India, is of three types. First is paper thin pottery, biscuit-coloured pottery decorated with incised patterns. Next is the scraffito technique, the matka pot is polished and painted with red and white slips along with intricate patterns. The third is polished pottery, this type of pottery is strong and deeply incised, and has stylized patterns of arabesques.

=== Glazed pottery ===
Early glazed ceramics were used for making beads, seals, bangles during Neolithic period but these glazes were very rarely used on pottery. These glazed beads and bangles are predominantly in colours of light blue and green with common occurrence of white, red, dark blue and black coloured glazed beads are also known.

Glazed pottery more noticeably began in the 12th century AD. This type of pottery often has a white background and has blue and green patterns. Glazed pottery is only practiced in parts of the country.

== Terracotta sculpture ==
Terracotta is the term used for unglazed earthenware, and for ceramic sculpture made in it. Indian sculpture made heavy use of terracotta from a very early period (with stone and metal sculpture being rather rare), and in more sophisticated areas had largely abandoned modelling for using moulds by the 1st century BC. This allows relatively large figures, nearly up to life-size, to be made, especially in the Gupta period (319-543 CE) and the centuries immediately following it. Several vigorous local popular traditions of terracotta folk sculpture remain active today, such as the Bankura horses. Often women prepare clay figures to propitiate their gods and goddesses, during festivals. In Moela deities are created with moulded clay on a flat surface. They are then fired and painted in bright colours. Other parts of India use this style to make figures like horses with riders, sometimes votive offerings.

== Disposable ceramic tableware ==
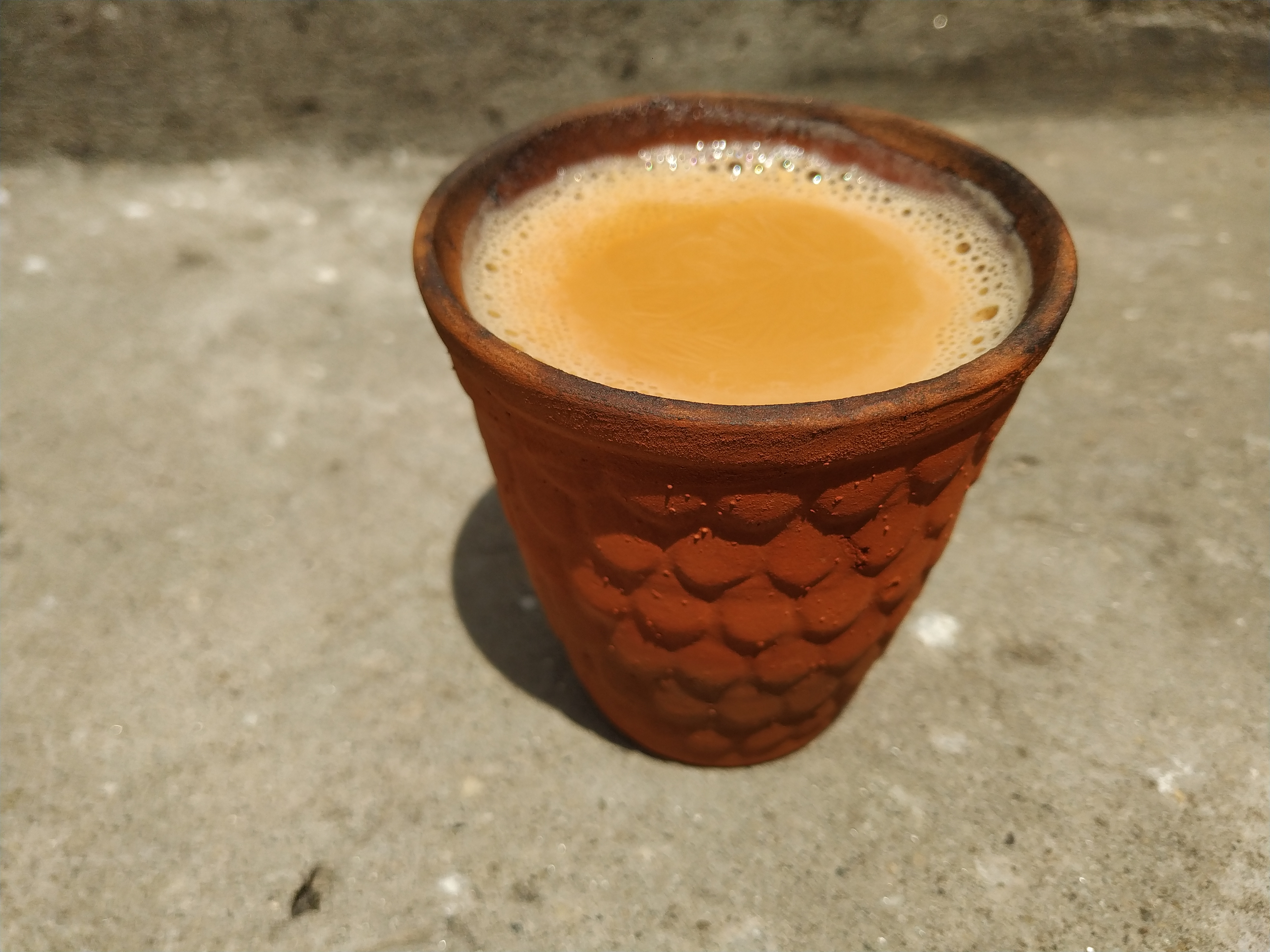
Tea served in a kulhar

A kulhar is a traditional handle-less pottery cup from Indian subcontinent that is typically undecorated and unglazed, and is meant to be disposable.

== Other sources ==
- Jarrige, Jean-François: 1985, Continuity and change in the North Kachi Plain at the beginning of the 2nd millennium BC, in J Schotsmans and M. Taddei (eds.) South Asian Archaeology, Naples 1983. Instituto Universatirio Orientale.
