= Udai Sagar Lake =

Lake in Udaipur, India

- Udaisagar Lake
- Location within Rajasthan
- Location: Udaipur, Rajasthan
- Coordinates: 24.570811°N 73.821351°E
- Type: reservoir, fresh water, polymictic
- Basin countries: India
- Built: 1565
- Max. length: 4 km (2.5 mi)
- Max. width: 2.5 km (1.6 mi)
- Surface area: 10.5 km^{2} (4.1 sq mi)
- Max. depth: 9 m (30 ft)
- Settlements: Udaipur
- References: http://www.udaipur.org.uk/lakes/udai-sagar-lake.html

Udai Sagar Lake, one of the five prominent lakes of Udaipur, is situated around 13 km in the east of Udaipur. This lake was built by Udai Singh II in 1565. Udai Sagar Lake is around 4 km in length, 2.5 km in width and 9 meters deep at its maximum. It is fed by the Ahar River.

== History ==
In 1559, Udai Singh constructed a dam on Berach River to ensure adequate supply of water in his kingdom. Udai Sagar Lake was developed as an outcome of this dam. This dam at Udai Sagar Lake drains about 479 km^{2}, and covers an area of 10.5 km^{2}.

On January 24, 1680, the emperor Aurangzeb visited Udai Sagar Lake and ordered the demolition of all three temples on the banks of the lake.

== Threats to the lake ==
According to a study on level of pollution in Udai Sagar, the lake's water revealed high phosphate content, due to discharge of pollutants from surrounding phosphorite mines, chemical factories, distillery, sewage and domestic waste from settlements and hotels. All these pollutants, reaching this lake through the River Ahar, make the water unhygienic for human consumption and unfavourable for survival of aquatic life.

== Lake restoration works ==
The task of restoration and transformation of the Lake Udai Sagar and Goverdhan Sagar is taken up by National Lake Conservation Program (NLCP). Udaipur is the first city in the state where all 4 lakes will be developed under the NLCP.

The key undertakings under this program include:

- Curbing pollution in the lakes.
- Restrictions on disposal of waste products and sewerage in the lakes.
- Restrictions on mining activities in the catchment areas.
- Conservation of wildlife around the lakes.
- Protection of birds as well as heritage properties.

== See also ==
- List of dams and reservoirs in India
- List of lakes in India
- Udaipur
- Tourist Attractions in Udaipur
