= Gilund =

Village in Rajasthan, India

Coordinates: 25°01′N 74°15′E

Gilund is a village and an archaeological site located in Rajsamand district of Rajasthan state in western India. It is one of five ancient sites excavated in the Ahar-Banas Complex which also includes the sites of Ahar, Ojiyana, Marmi, and Balathal. Out of the 111 reported sites found in the Ahar-Banas Complex, Gilund is the largest. The archaeological site was named after the present-day village, Gilund, and is locally known as Modiya Magari which means "bald habitation mound".

== Location ==
Gilund is located in the Banas Basin located within the middle of the Mewar Plain, which lies between the Aravalli Mountains and the Deccan Plateau. It is approximately 1.20 km south of the Banas River with two other major nearby river in the area, Kothari and Berach. Research conducted on the climate of the ancient site shows that it used to be wetter than it presently is. The environment is semi arid with summers that hot and dry and winter that are cold and dry.

== Ancient site ==
Gilund
- Location within India

Site notes
- Area: 500 X 250 yards
- Excavation dates: 1959–1960, 1999–2005
- Condition: Partially excavated
- Excavated by B. B. Lal in 1959–60, revisited by a team from the University of Pennsylvania and Deccan College from 1999 to 2005.

At the ancient site of Gilund, two mounds labelled as 'eastern' and 'western', measuring 45 ft and 25 ft respectively above the surrounding fields in height and covering an area of 500 X 250 yards were partially excavated by a team under the direction of B. B. Lal during 1959-60. Excavation was carried out at three different areas, designated as GLD-1 (with its extension GLD-1A), GLD-2 and GLD-3. The site was later revisited from 1999 to 2005 by a team from the University of Pennsylvania and the Deccan College in Pune, India. Both sites have been occupied since the beginning of the Chalcolithic period, but it is evident that the eastern mound is taller due to a period of longer occupation.

Gilund was occupied from approximately 3000-1700 BCE as the region’s largest Chalcolithic site. These years of occupation are divided into three phases: Late Ahar-Banas 2000-1700 BCE, Middle Ahar-Banas 2500-2000 BCE, and Early Ahar-Banas 3000-2500 BCE. Here various housing structures have been uncovered, as well as large buildings with long parallel walls, workshops, refuse heaps, and an exterior wall surrounding the site. Structures were made from mud brick and burnt brick. The workshop area has revealed that the occupants practiced small-scale craft production. Further analysis of the areas also shows that the inhabitants were agro-pastoralists, meaning that they mixed agricultural practices with livestock herding practices. This is evidently seen through the faunal remains of sheep, goat, and cattle and signifies a sedentary lifestyle. The variety of stone stools and ground stones discovered also suggest early social complexity as they were used for grain processing and grinding.

The most common artifacts found in Gilund were ceramics. Although few pieces of pottery and bones date back to the Mesolithic period, it does not compare to the amount found at Bagor. The pottery designs consisted of designs such as leaves and cross-hatchings marked on the surface. Much of the pottery was Chalcolithic with white-painted black and red ware, red ware, and gray ware. Other artifacts found were terracotta figurines of mostly bull or cattle, stone tools used for making beads and lithics, ear spools, studs, and bangles. Artifact analysis has linked objects found at Gilund to the other sites in the Ahar-Banas Complex, as well as the site of Bagor. In addition, lithics at Gilund and Bagor were produced using the same techniques.

=== Cache of seal impressions ===
In 2003 excavations at Gilund, archaeologists discovered a large cache of seal impressions dating to 2100-1700 BC. A large bin filled with more than 100 seal impressions was found by a team led by archaeologists from the University of Pennsylvania Museum and the Deccan College.

Gregory Possehl and Vasant Shinde led the excavations.

The impression designs, according to Dr. Possehl, offer additional evidence for a more worldly-wise culture than was formerly assumed to exist at Gilund. The impressions found in the bin were made from seals both round and rectilinear. The design motifs are generally quite simple, with wide-ranging parallels from Indus Civilization sites such as Chanhu-daro, Pirak, Kot Diji and Nindowari, 400 to 500 miles away. There are also distinct parallels with seals from another cultural group archaeologists call the Bactria-Margiana Archaeological Complex (BMAC), from as far away as Central Asia and northern Afghanistan, 1,000 miles to the northwest.
