= Virendra Nath =

Virendra Nath or Virendranath are given names. Notable people with the names include:

- Virendranath Chattopadhyaya
- Virendra Nath Misra
- Virendra Nath Pandey
