= Jhukar phase =

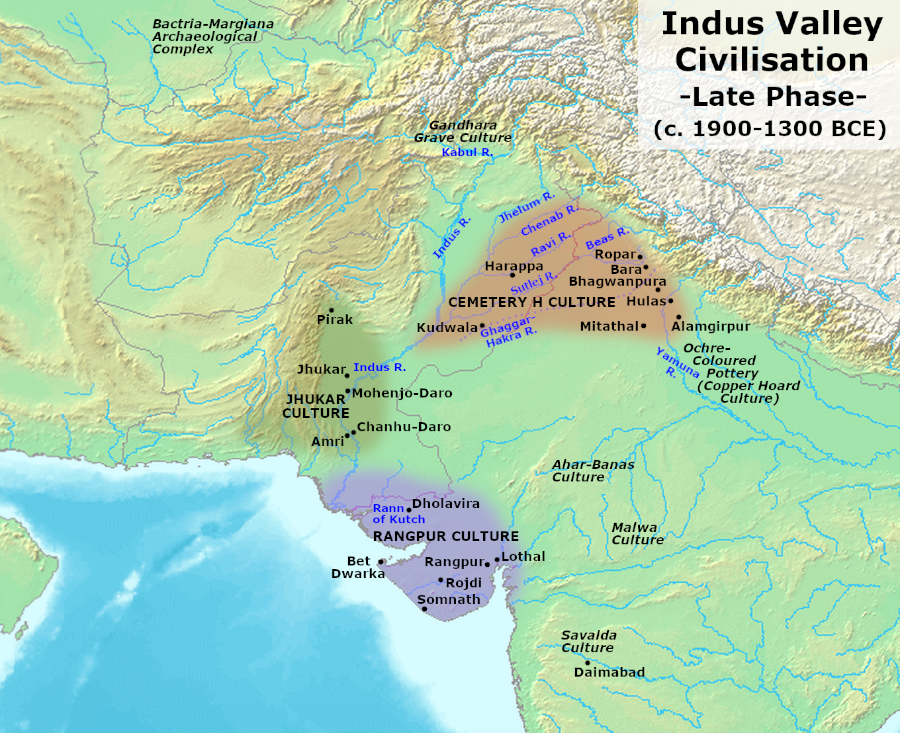
Map of the Indus Valley Civilization, late phase

The Jhukar phase was a phase of the Late Harappan culture in Sindh that continued after the decline of the mature Indus Valley Civilisation in the 2nd millennium BCE. It is named after the archaeological type site called Jhukar in Sindh. It was, in turn, followed by the Jhangar phase.

Jhukar and Jhangar phases are collectively called Jhukar and Jhangar culture (1900 - 1500 BCE). Cemetery H culture (subculture of Late Harrapan IVC phase) in Punjab was contemporaneous to Jhukar-Jhangar culture (subculture of late Harrapan IVC phase) in Sindh, both have evidence of continuity and change. Jhukar culture is associated with the sites excavated at Jhukar, Chanchudaro and Amri (Amri also as an earlier and distinct Amri culture belonging to earlier phases of IVC). Rangpur culture in Gujarat, also part of late phase of IVC, was also contemporaneous to both.

The pottery of this phase is described as "showing some continuity with mature Harappan pottery traditions." During this phase, urban features of cities (such as Mohenjo-Daro) disappeared, and artifacts such as stone weights and female figurines became rare. This phase is characterized by some circular stamp seals with geometric designs, although lacking the Indus script which characterized the preceding phase of the civilization. Script is rare and confined to potsherd inscriptions. There was also a decline in long-distance trade.

== See also ==
- Chronological dating
  - Phases in archaeology
  - Pottery in the Indian subcontinent
- Periodisation of the Indus Valley Civilisation
  - Ahar-Banas culture
  - Late Harappan phase of IVC (1900–1500 BCE)
    - Cemetery H culture in Punjab
    - Jhukar–Jhangar culture in Punjab
    - Rangpur culture in Gujarat
- Vedic period
  - Kuru kingdom (1200 – c. 500 BCE)
  - Ochre Coloured Pottery culture (2000–1500 BCE)
  - Copper Hoard culture (2800-1500 BCE), may or may not be independent of vedic culture
