= Rangpur, Gujarat =

Ancient archaeological site in Gujarat, western India

Rangpur
- Location within India
- 22°26′N 71°55′E
- Type: Settlement
- Periods: Harappan 1 to Iron Age
- Cultures: Indus Valley civilization
- Location: Surendranagar district, Gujarat, India

Rangpur is an ancient archaeological site in Surendranagar district near Vanala on Saurashtra peninsula in Gujarat, western India. Lying on the tip between the Gulf of Khambhat and Gulf of Kutch, it belongs to the period of the Indus Valley civilization, and lies to the northwest of the larger site of Lothal. It is the type site for the Rangpur culture, a regional form of the late phase of the Indus Valley Civilization that existed in Gujarat during the 2nd millennium BCE.

== Excavation ==
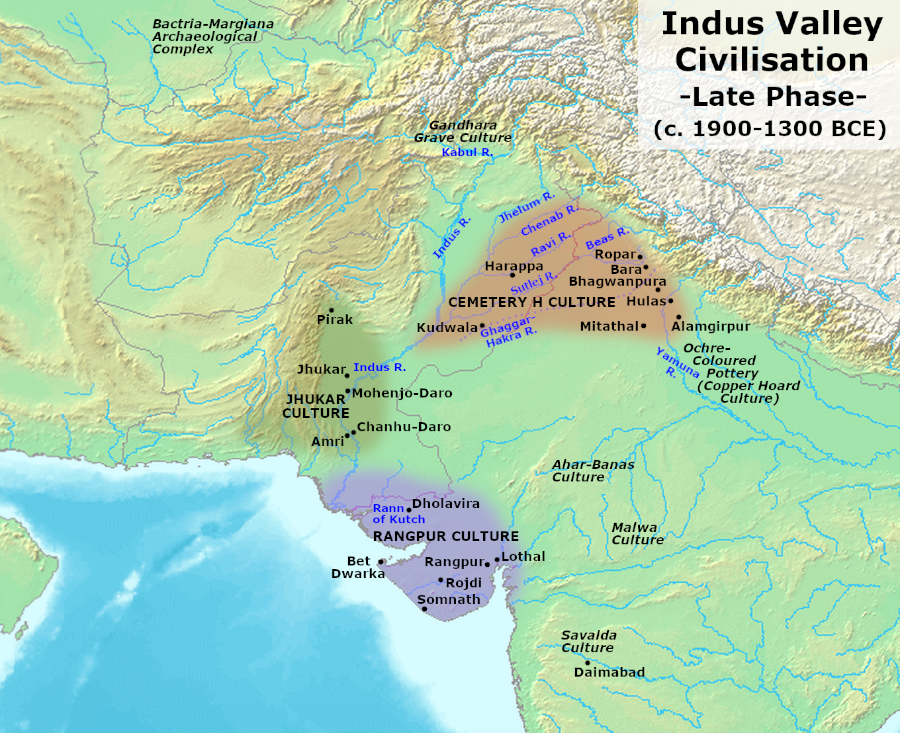
Map of Rangpur and other sites of the Indus Valley Civilization, late phase.

Rangpur culture: Based on the distinct pottery excavated here, it was identified as a separate culture or subculture.

Trail Diggings were conducted by the Archeological Survey of India (ASI) during 1931 led by M.S.Vats. Later, Ghurye (1939), Dikshit (1947) and S. R. Rao (1953–56) excavated the site under ASI projects.

S.R.Rao has classified the deposits into four periods with three sub periods in Harappan Culture, Period II with an earlier Period, Microlithic and a Middle Paleolithic State (River sections) with points, scrapers and blades of jasper. The dates given by S.R.Rao are:

- Period I - Microlithis unassociated with Pottery : 3000 BC
- Period II - Harappan : 2000–1500 BC
  - Period II B - Late Harappan : 1500–1100 BC
  - Period II C - Transition Phase of Harappa : 1100–1000 BC
- Period III - Lustrous Red Ware Period : 1000-800 BC.

== Architecture and town planning ==
Acacia wood was used in Rangpur for construction, tools and furniture.

== Artifacts found ==
Dishes with beaded rim and grooved shoulder, painted black - and redware and high-necked jars. Evidence of shell working found. Other artifacts found at the site include axes, beads of steatite and carnelian and Earthen wares.

== Cultivation ==
Large quantity of plant remains were found at Rangpur. Bajra, rice (Period IIA) and Millet (Period HI) were found.

== Diet ==
People of Rangpur culture used rice and bajra for food. They also used to consume milk and curds from their domesticated animals.

== See also ==
- Bet Dwarka
- Chronological dating
  - Phases in archaeology
  - Pottery in the Indian subcontinent
- List of Indus Valley Civilization sites
- Periodisation of the Indus Valley Civilisation
  - Ahar-Banas culture
  - Late Harappan Phase of IVC (1900 - 1500 BCE)
    - Cemetery H culture in Punjab
    - Jhukar-Jhangar culture in Punjab
    - Rangpur culture in Gujarat
