= Jhukar-jo-Daro =

Archaeological site in Sindh, Pakistan

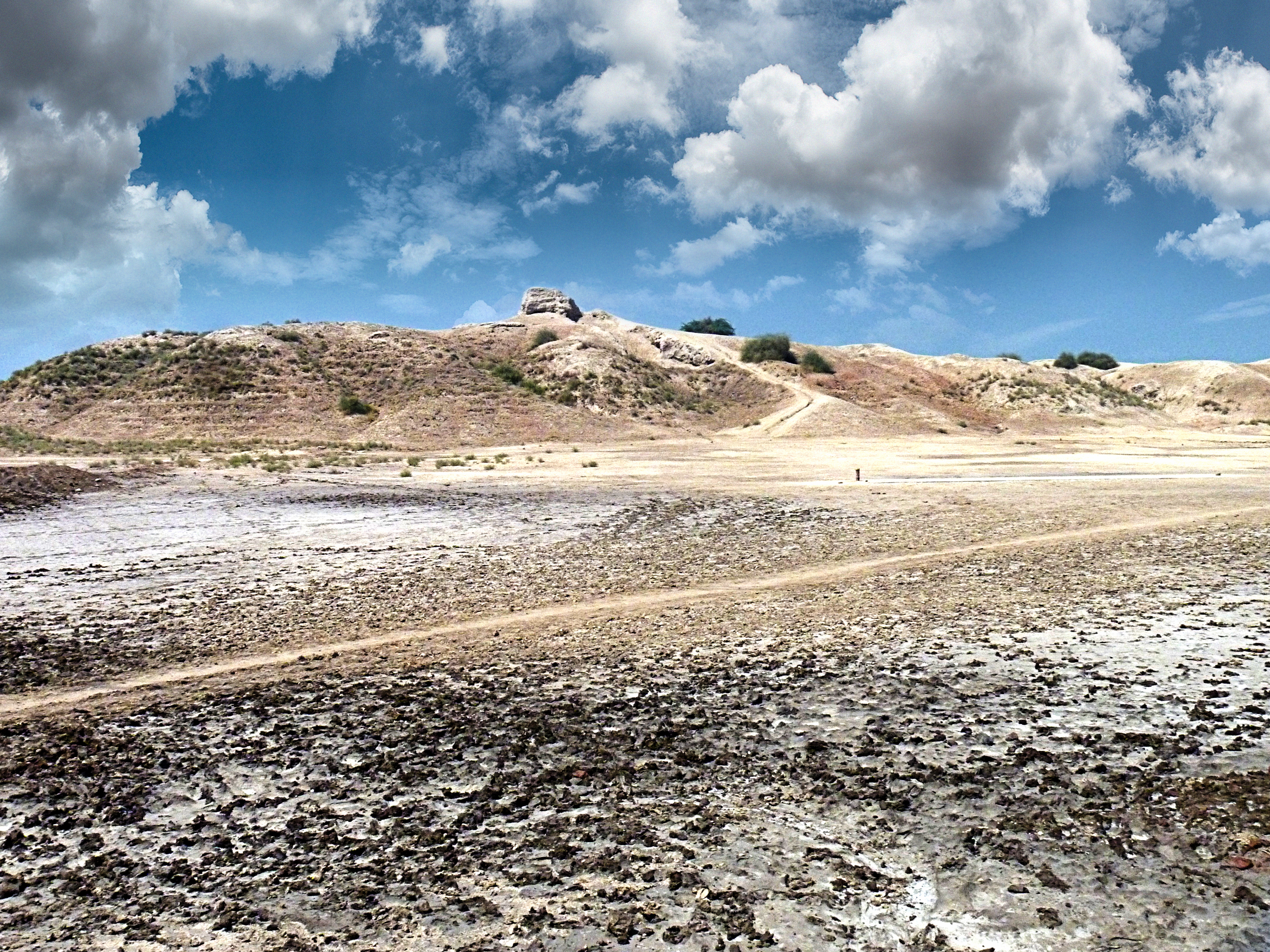
Jhukar-jo-Daro

The Jhukar-jo-Daro (Sindhi: جهڪر جو دڙو) is the highest mud mound in Larkana, located at a distance of 6 miles (10 kilometers) from Larkana city towards west near to village Mithodero on the left of the Larkana-Mehar Road (N55 National Highway) in Larkana District, Sindh, Pakistan. It was explored and excavated by renowned archaeologist N. G. Majumdar in 1928. Jhukar-Jo-Daro is an archaeological site where Jhukar Phase was explored and it has been recorded that Harappan Phase came after or it is followed by Jhukar Culture. Some historians have revealed that Jhukar Phase partly covers or overlaps with the Harapppan Phase but obviously persists much later. The remains of late Harappan culture of Chalcolithic period were discovered here at Jhukar-Jo-Daro.
