= Balathal =

Archeological site in Indian state of Rajasthan

Coordinates: 24°43′N 73°59′E

- Topographic map of Rajasthan, India Copper Age Ahar-Banas culture sites. Many sites are east of Aravalli Range, near Banas River and its tributaries.
- Interactive map of Balathal
- Location: Vallabhnagar tehsil, Udaipur district, Rajasthan, India

Site notes
- Excavation dates: 1994–2000
- Archaeologists: V. N. Misra, Deccan College, Institute of Rajasthan Studies
- Condition: Ruins

Balathal is an archaeological site located in Vallabhnagar tehsil of Udaipur district of Rajasthan state in western India. It is one of the ninety Ahar-Banas culture sites located in the Basins of the Banas river and its tributaries.

== Excavation ==
The archaeological site, located 6 km from Vallabhnagar town and 42 km from Udaipur city. It was discovered by V. N. Misra during a survey in 1962-63. It was excavated from 1994 to 2000, jointly by the Department of Archaeology of the Deccan College Post-graduate and Research Institute, Pune and the Institute of Rajasthan Studies, Rajasthan Vidyapeeth, Udaipur under the direction of V. N. Misra of the Deccan College. Balathal is one of the important sites in Mewar region of Rajasthan. The extensive excavations carried out at the site have produced vast amounts of data.

There were various ethnobotanical remains recovered at Balathal and these include wheat, barley, Indian jujube, okra, and Job's tears as well as several varieties of millet, lentils, and peas. The excavated remains also included domesticated animals such as sheep, goat, and cattle. Archaeologists also discovered several burial sites where the earliest evidence of leprosy in Indian Subcontinent was found. This was identified in the remains of an adult male buried sometime between 2500 and 2000 B.C.

Balathal was occupied during two cultural periods: the Chalcolithic and the Early Historic.

== Chalcolithic phase ==
Chalcolithic Period (3000-1500 B.C.), also referred to as the Ahar culture is characterized partially by its well-planned structures. For example, buildings had multiple rooms, with structures servings varying functions. Evidence from this era that was found includes clay, stone, shell, and copper objects, as well as floral and animal remains. Some of the pottery from Balathal was locally produced, while other types found at Balathal came from other sites in the Ahar-Banas Complex. This, and other, evidence show that the chalcolithic communities traded and exchanged materials with other contemporary communities, which may have included settlements like Harappan in Gujarat.

Available data suggest that Balathal was a well-fortified settlement and underwent a period of economic development and then a decline. This decline entailed a decrease in population and corresponded with the rise of a contemporary Indus Valley Civilisation.

== Early Historic phase ==
After the Chalcolithic phase, Balathal was abandoned for a long time until the Early Historic phase (500-200 B.C.) of the site’s activity. It was discovered that there was a cultural vacuum that persisted from five to six centuries. This new settlement already had the knowledge of iron, which enabled the inhabitants to establish agriculture practice and production. The excavated artifacts, which included tools such as plows, sickles, knives, spades, hoes, and adzes, among others, revealed that the settlement already produced crops twice a year.

== Meditating Yogi's skeleton ==
A 2700-year-old skeleton of a meditating yogi in the cross-legged sitting jñāna mudrā position with hands resting on knees and index finger touching the thumb to form a circle was found at Balthal. This represents the spiritual enlightenment in the Indian-origin religions. Sometimes sadhus chose to be buried alive in this yogic samadhi. This is the oldest archaeological skeletal evidence of yoga.

== See also ==
- List of Indus Valley Civilisation sites
- List of State Protected Monuments in Rajasthan
- List of Monuments of National Importance in Rajasthan
- Tourism in Rajasthan
