= Ahar River =

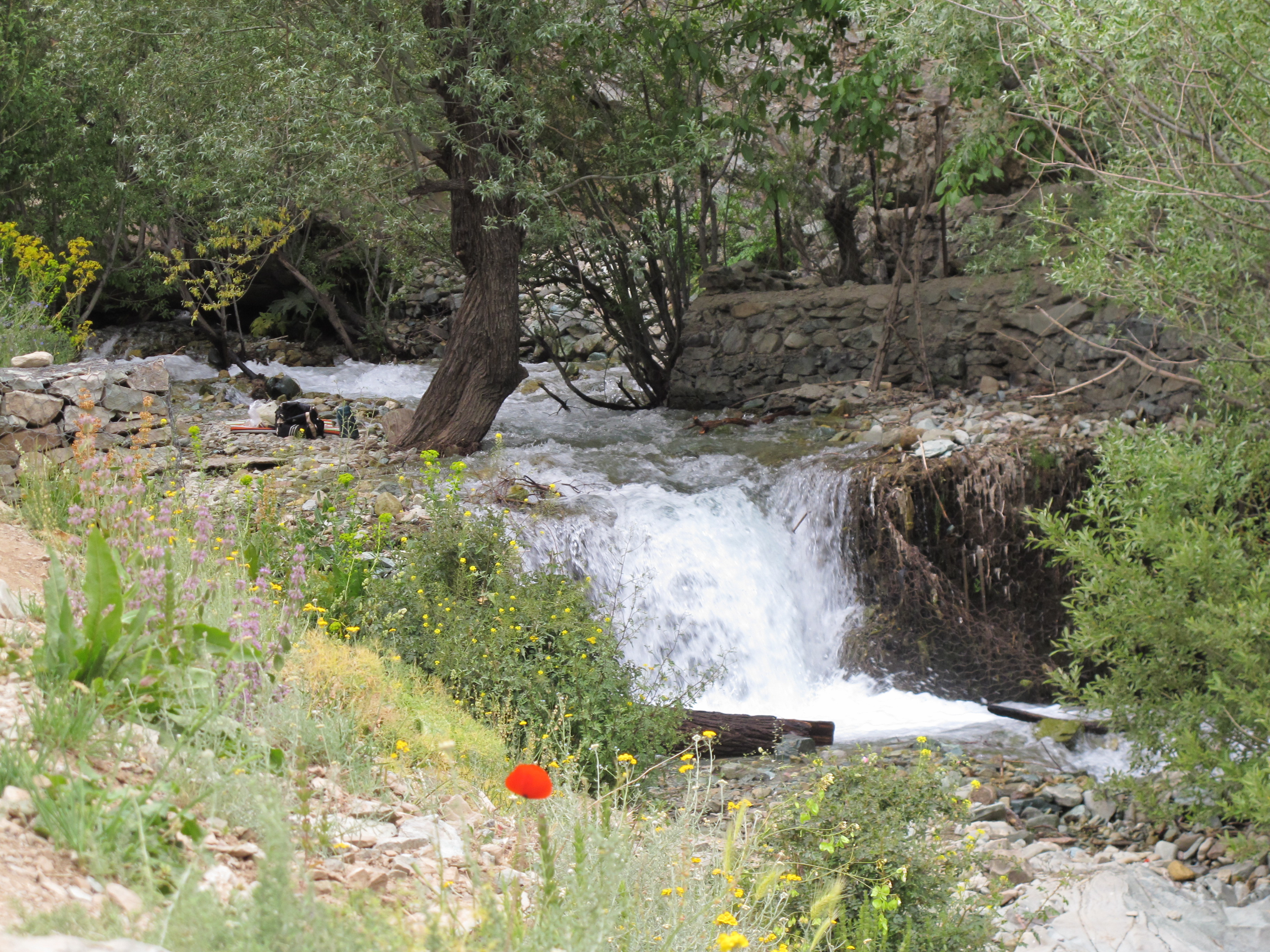

- Location within Rajasthan Location within India

Location
- Country: India
- States: Rajasthan and Uttar Pradesh
- Cities: Udaipur; Mewar

Physical characteristics
- Source: Aravalli Range
  - location: Udaipur, Mewar, Rajasthan, India
  - coordinates: 24°34′N 73°48′E
- Mouth: Ahar-Berach sangam confluence
  - location: Madhya Pradesh, India

Basin features
- Progression: Ahar River, Berach River, Banas River, Chambal River, Yamuna River, Ganges River
- River system: Ganges

The Ahar River is a tributary of the Berach River which drains to the Banas River, a tributary of the Chambal River which drains to the Yamuna River, the principal tributary of Ganges River.

The river flows through Udaipur city. The outflow of Lake Pichola and Fateh Sagar Lake of Udaipur district enters the Ahar river. The river further downstream feeds Udaisagar Lake just outside Udaipur city.

== Historical Significance ==
Ahar River is also the site of 3000 BC to 1500BC Chalcolithic (copper-stone age) archaeological culture, the Ahar-Banas culture.

On the river bank in Udaipur there are royal cenotaphs (memorials) of Maharanas of Mewar called "Ahar ki Chhatriya" literally Ahar Cenotaphs.

== Water quality and pollution ==
A study conducted to investigate the amount of organic material found pharmaceuticals, personal care products, steroid hormones and industrial chemicals in the water samples collected along the river. The study also found that contaminant concentrations generally increased with the population density in the surrounding areas, with high concentrations persisting up to 10 km downstream of the most densely populated areas. There is currently no wastewater treatment being done along the river's course.
