= Cemetery H culture =

Bronze Age culture in northern Indian subcontinent

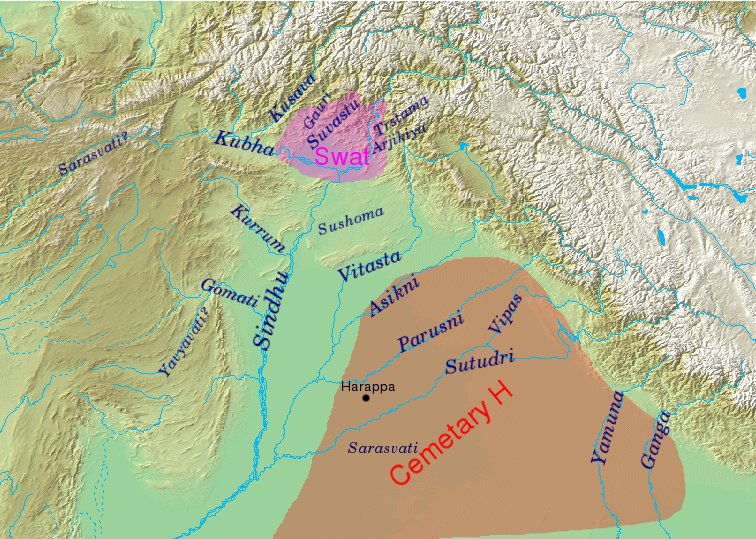
- The extent of the Swat and Cemetery H cultures are indicated; Geography of the Rigveda, with Rigvedic rivers names
- Geographical range: Punjab, Haryana, Western Uttar Pradesh
- Period: Bronze Age
- Dates: c. 1900–1300 BCE
- Type site: Harappa
- Major sites: Harappa; Bhagwanpura
- Characteristics: Extensive copper metallurgy cremation of human remains
- Followed by: Painted Grey Ware culture

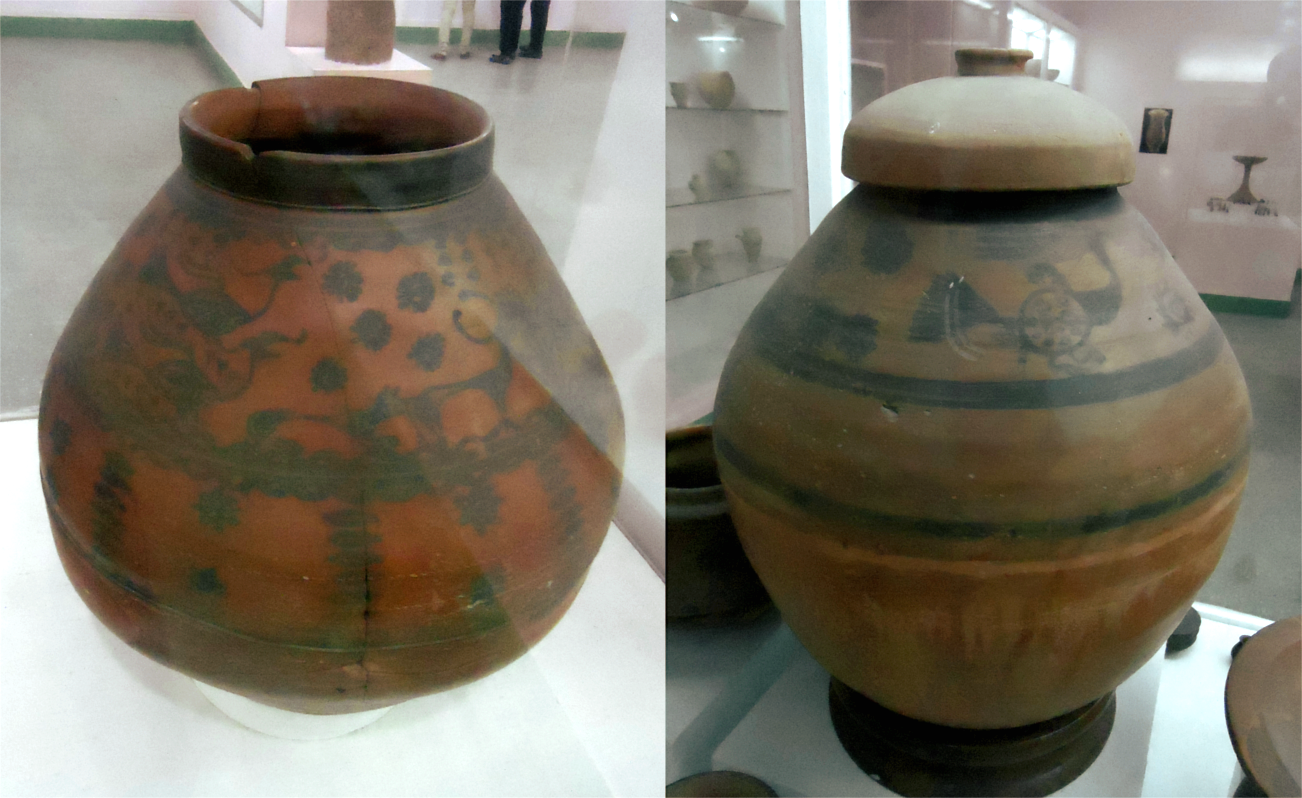
Painted pottery urns from Harappa (Cemetery H period) might correspond to a period of shift towards Vedic culture.

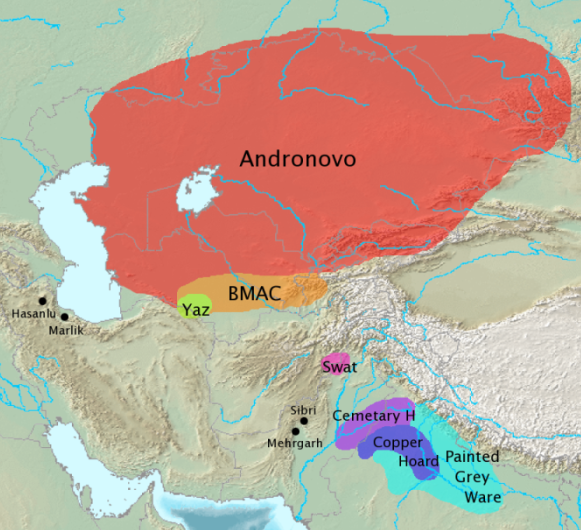
Archaeological cultures associated with Indo-Iranian migrations (after EIEC). The Andronovo, BMAC and Yaz cultures have often been associated with Indo-Iranian migrations. The GGC (Swat), Cemetery H, Copper Hoard and PGW cultures are candidates for cultures associated with Indo-Aryan migrations.

The Cemetery H culture was a Bronze Age culture in the northern part of the Indian subcontinent, particularly in the modern-day regions of Punjab, Haryana and Western Uttar Pradesh, from about 1900 BCE until about 1300 BCE. It is regarded as a regional form of the late phase of the Harappan (Indus Valley) civilisation (alongside the Jhukar culture of Sindh and Rangpur culture of Gujarat), but also as a phase of the Indo-Aryan migrations.

== Origins ==
The Cemetery H culture was located in and around the Punjab region in present-day Pakistan and India. It was named after a cemetery found in "area H" at Harappa. Remains of the culture have been dated from about 1900 BCE until about 1300 BCE.

According to Mohammad Rafique Mughal, the Cemetery H culture developed out of the northern part of the Indus Valley civilisation around 1700 BCE, being part of the Punjab Phase, one of three cultural phases that developed in the Localisation Era or "Late Harappan phase" of the Indus Valley Tradition. According to Kenoyer, the Cemetery H culture "may only reflect a change in the focus of settlement organization from that which was the pattern of the earlier Harappan phase and not cultural discontinuity, urban decay, invading aliens, or site abandonment, all of which have been suggested in the past." According to Kennedy and Mallory & Adams, the Cemetery H culture also "shows clear biological affinities" with the earlier population of Harappa.

Some traits of the Cemetery H culture have been associated with the Swat culture, which has been regarded as evidence of the Indo-Aryan movement toward the Indian subcontinent. According to Parpola, the Cemetery H culture represents a first wave of Indo-Aryan migration from as early as 1900 BCE, which was followed by a migration to the Punjab c. 1700–1400 BCE. According to Kochhar, the Swat IV co-founded the Harappan Cemetery H phase in Punjab (2000–1800 BCE), while the Rigvedic Indo-Aryans of Swat V later absorbed the Cemetery H people and gave rise to the Painted Grey Ware culture (to 1400 BCE).

Together with the Gandhara grave culture and the Ochre Coloured Pottery culture, the Cemetery H culture is considered by some scholars as a factor in the formation of the Vedic civilisation.

== Features ==
The distinguishing features of this culture include:

- The use of cremation of human remains. The bones were stored in painted pottery burial urns. This is completely different from the Indus civilisation where bodies were buried in wooden coffins. The urn burials and the "grave skeletons" were nearly contemporaneous.
- Reddish pottery, painted in black with antelopes, peacocks etc., sun or star motifs, with different surface treatments to the earlier period.
- Expansion of settlements into the east.
- Rice became a main crop.
- Apparent breakdown of the widespread trade of the Indus civilisation, with materials such as marine shells no longer used.
- Continued use of mud brick for building.

Some of the designs painted on the Cemetery H funerary urns have been interpreted through the lens of Vedic mythology:

For instance, peacocks with hollow bodies and a small human form inside, which has been interpreted as the souls of the dead, and a hound that can be seen as the hound of Yama, the god of death. This may indicate the introduction of new religious beliefs during this period, but the archaeological evidence does not support the hypothesis that the Cemetery H people were the destroyers of the Harappan cities.

== Archaeology ==
Cremation in India is first attested in the Cemetery H culture, a practice previously described in the Vedas. The Rigveda contains a reference to the emerging practice, in RV 10.15.14, where the forefathers "both cremated (agnidagdhá-) and uncremated (ánagnidagdha-)" are invoked.

== See also ==
- Chronological dating
  - Phases in archaeology
  - Pottery in the Indian subcontinent
- Periodisation of the Indus Valley Civilisation
  - Ahar–Banas culture (3000–1500 BCE)
  - Late Harappan Phase of IVC (1900–1500 BCE)
    - Cemetery H culture in Punjab
    - Jhukar-Jhangar culture in Punjab
    - Rangpur culture in Gujarat
- Vedic period
  - Kuru kingdom (1200 – c. 500 BCE)
  - OCP (2000–1500 BCE)
  - Copper Hoard culture (2800–1500 BCE), may or may not be independent of vedic culture

== Sources ==
- Kennedy, Kenneth A. R. (2000), God-Apes and Fossil Men: Palaeoanthropology of South Asia, Ann Arbor: University of Michigan Press
- Kenoyer, Jonathan Mark (1991a), "The Indus Valley tradition of Pakistan and Western India", Journal of World Prehistory, 5 (4): 1–64, doi:10.1007/BF00978474, S2CID 41175522
- Kenoyer, Jonathan Mark (1991b), "Urban Process in the Indus Tradition: A preliminary model from Harappa", in Meadow, R. H. (ed.), Harappa Excavations 1986–1990: A multidiscipinary approach to Third Millennium urbanism, Madison, WI: Prehistory Press, pp. 29–60
- Kochhar, Rajesh (2000), The Vedic People: Their History and Geography, Sangam Books
- Mallory, J. P.; Adams, D. Q. (1997), Encyclopedia of Indo-European Culture, London and Chicago: Fitzroy-Dearborn, ISBN 1-884964-98-2
- Parpola, Asko (1998), "Aryan Languages, Archaeological Cultures, and Sinkiang: Where Did Proto-Iranian Come into Being and How Did It Spread?", in Mair, Victor H. (ed.), The Bronze Age and Early Iron Age Peoples of Eastern Central Asia, Washington, D.C.: Institute for the Study of Man, ISBN 0-941694-63-1
- Sarkar, Sasanka Sekhar (1964), Ancient Races of Baluchistan, Panjab, and Sind
- Shaffer, Jim G. (1992), "The Indus Valley, Baluchistan and Helmand Traditions: Neolithic Through Bronze Age", in Ehrich, R. W. (ed.), Chronologies in Old World Archaeology (2nd ed.), Chicago: University of Chicago Press, pp. I:441–464, II:425–446
