= Vanala =

- village
- Location in Gujarat, India Vanala (India)
- Coordinates: 22°27′0″N 71°59′0″E
- Country: India
- State: Gujarat
- District: Surendranagar

Government
  - Body: Panchayat

Population
  - Total: 1,028
  - Rank: 1100

Languages
  - Official: Gujarati, Hindi
- Time zone: UTC+5:30 (IST)
- Telephone code: 02753
- Vehicle registration: GJ13
- Nearest city: Dhandhuka, Limbdi
- Sex ratio: 52:48 ♂/♀
- Civic agency: Panchayat
- Website: gujaratindia.com

Vanala is a village and former Rajput princely state on Saurashtra peninsula in Gujarat state, western India.

== History ==
The nearby archeological site of Rangpur, Gujarat dates back to the Harappan culture.

Vanala was a petty princely state in Jhalawar prant, comprising only Vana village, under a Jhala Rajput Chieftain.

During the British Raj, the petty state was under the colonial Eastern Kathiawar Agency.

== Village ==
Vanla lies in Chuda Taluka, Surendranagar district.

It is a tiny village of population of around 1100.

It has good road transport facilities from Limbdi (21 km) and Dhandhuka (10 km).

== External links and sources ==
- Imperial Gazetteer on DSAL.UChicago - Kathiawar
