= Virendra Nath Misra =

Indian archaeologist (1935–2015)

Virendra Nath Misra (9 January 1935 – 31 October 2015) was an Indian archaeologist. He graduated from University of Pune. He is noted for his research into the Indus Valley civilization.

== Life and career ==
Misra came from a small Village at the bank of ramganga river-Nisvi, Khandauli, in Farrukhabad district, Uttar Pradesh. After completing his initial studies from the University of Lucknow, he joined the Deccan College, Pune and graduated from the University of Pune. He is noted for his research in Prehistory, Protohistory and Ethnoarchaeology. A career spanning over several decades, Misra is remembered for his studies in northern Rajasthan, western Madhya Pradesh and Maharashtra. He excavated important archaeological sites such as Bhimbetka (a world Heritage site) and Balathal, among others. Misra died in Pune on 31 October 2015, at the age of 80.

== Publications ==
- 1965. V. N. Misra and M. S. Mate (eds.). Indian Prehistory: 1964. Pune: Deccan College.
- 1965. V. N. Misra. Pre and Proto-history of the Berach Basin, South Rajasthan. Poona : Deccan College.
- 1967. J. R. Lukacs, V. N. Misra, and K. A. R. Kennedy. Bagor and Tilwara: Late Mesolithic Cultures of Northwest India. Vol. I: The Human Skeletal Remains. Poona: Deccan College.
- 1978. V. N. Misra, Y. Mathpal and M. Nagar. Prehistoric Man and his Art at Bhimbetka, Central India. Poona.
- 1985. V. N. Misra and Peter Bellwood (eds.). Recent Advances in Indo-Pacific Prehistory. Delhi: Oxford-IBH.
- 1992. V. N. Misra (ed.) Indus Civilization, a special Number of the Eastern Anthropologist. Lucknow: Ethnographic & Folk Culture Society.
- 2009. V. N. Misra and A. K. Kanungo (eds). Dr. Swarajya Prakash Gupta: An Academic and Human Profile. Indian Society for Prehistoric and Quaternary Studies. ISBN 978-81-908330-0-4.
