= Ahar–Banas culture =

Chalcolithic archaeological culture

- Ahar–Banas culture sites
- Geographical range: India
- Period: Bronze Age (black and red ware culture)
- Dates: c. 3000 – c. 1500 BCE
- Type site: Settlement
- Major sites: in Rajasthan and Madhya Pradesh, India
- Characteristics: Contemporary of Indus Valley civilisation, Ochre Coloured Pottery, Cemetery H
- Preceded by: Chalcolithic
- Followed by: Black and red ware culture, Vedic Period

The Ahar culture, also known as the Banas culture, is a Chalcolithic archaeological culture on the banks of the Ahar River of southeastern Rajasthan state in India, lasting from c. 3000 to 1500 BCE, contemporary and adjacent to the Indus Valley civilization. Situated along the Banas and Berach Rivers, as well as the Ahar River, the Ahar–Banas people were exploiting the copper ores of the Aravalli Range to make axes and other artefacts. They were sustained on a number of crops, including wheat and barley.

== Geographical extent ==
More than 90 sites of the Ahar culture have been identified to date. The main distribution seems to be concentrated in the river valleys of Banas and its tributaries. A number of sites with Ahar culture level are also found from Jawad, Mandsaur, Kayatha and Dangwada in Madhya Pradesh state. In Rajasthan, most of the sites are located in Udaipur, Chittorgarh, Dungarpur, Banswara, Ajmer, Tonk and Bhilwara districts, which include, Ahar, Gilund, Bansen, Keli, Balathal, Alod, Palod, Khor, Amoda, Nangauli, Champakheri, Tarawat, Fachar, Phinodra, Joera, Darauli, Gadriwas, Purani Marmi, Aguncha and Ojiyana.

In 2003 excavations at Gilund, archaeologists discovered a large cache of seal impressions dating to 2100–1700 BC. A large bin filled with more than 100 seal impressions was found by a team led by archaeologists from the University of Pennsylvania Museum and the Deccan College (Pune).

The design motifs of the seals are generally quite simple, with wide-ranging parallels from various Indus civilization sites. But also, there are parallels with seals from the Bactria–Margiana Archaeological Complex (BMAC) in Central Asia and northern Afghanistan, over 1,000 miles to the northwest.

== Pottery ==
Ahar-banas culture: Based on the pottery excavated here, this site is considered as a separate archaeological culture / subculture.

Typical Ahar pottery is a Black-and-Red ware (BRW) with linear and dotted designs painted on it in white pigment and has a limited range of shapes, which include bowls, bowls-on-stands, elongated vases and globular vases. The Ahar culture also had equally distinctive brightly slipped Red Ware, a Tan ware, ceramics in Burnished Black that were incised Thin Red ware, as well as incised and otherwise decorated Gray ware fabrics.

The pottery had a black top and reddish bottom, with paintings in white on the black surface. Because of these distinctive features, Ahar, when it was first noticed by R C Agrawal, was called the "black and red ware culture". This is in a way true, because this was primarily the pottery used by the inhabitants of Ahar for drinking and eating.

== List of sites ==
- Balathal
- Gilund
- Ojiyana

== See also ==
- Malwa culture
- Jorwe culture
- Pottery in the Indian subcontinent
