= Berach River =

- Interactive Map The Berach River (shown in red), a tributary of the Banas River (shown in Saffron)

Location
- Country: India
- State: Rajasthan
- District: Udaipur district, Chittorgarh district

Physical characteristics
- Source: Aravalli Range
  - location: Udaipur District, Rajasthan, India
  - coordinates: 25°15′N 75°02′E
- Mouth: Berach-Banas sangam confluence
  - location: Bigod village of Bhilwara district, Rajasthan, India
  - coordinates: 157 km
- Basin size: 7,502 km2

Basin features
- River system: Ganga river

The Berach River, a tributary of the Banas River, is a river of Rajasthan state in western India. The river belongs to the Ganga River basin. The Berach originates in the hills of Udaipur district, northeast of Udaipur, and has a length of 157 km and basin area of 7,502 km^{2}. It flows northeast through Udaipur, Chittorgarh and Bhilwara districts, joining the Banas near Bigod village of Bhilwara district.

Important tributaries of the Berach River are Ahar River, Wagli River, Wagon River, Gambhiri River, and Orai River (all of which are right-side tributaries).
