= Tourism in Haryana =

Tourism in Haryana relates to tourism in the state of Haryana, India. There are 22 tourism hubs created by Haryana Tourism Corporation (HTC), which are located in Ambala, Bhiwani, Faridabad, Fatehabad, Gurgaon, Hisar, Jhajjar, Jind, Kaithal, Karnal, Kaimla, Kurukshetra, Panchkula, Sirsa, Sonipat, Panipat, Rewari, Rohtak, Yamunanagar, Palwal and Mahendergarh.

Haryana is officially part of Mahabharata and Krishna tourism development circuit plans of government of India and government of Haryana.

== Tourism by theme ==
Haryana State Directorate of Archaeology & Museums and Haryana Tourism are responsible for archaeology and tourism in Haryana respectively.

=== Monuments ===
- Thematic history of Haryana
- Indus-Sarasvati civilization sites
- National monuments
- State monuments
- Monuments and memorials
- Forts
- Havelis
- Stepwells
- Museums

=== Culture ===
- Culture
- Music
- Temples

=== Nature ===
- National Parks & Wildlife Sanctuaries of Haryana
- List of protected areas of Haryana
- Dams
- Lakes
- Stepwells of Haryana
- Mountains

=== Other ===
- Other
- Highest point
- Tourist attractions

== Tourism by districts ==
=== Ambala ===
European Cemetery, Ambala Central Jail where Mahatma Gandhi's assassin Nathuram Godse and co-conspirator Narayan Apte were hanged, 1857 War Memorial over 22 acres on NH-44, Air Force Museum, etc. are important tourist sites.

=== Bhiwani ===
- Bhiwani
  - Indus-Saraswati Valley Civilization sites: Mitathal & Tigrana are
- Baliali: Samadhi of Todar Singh near Baliali (Phogat sisters' village) is a memorial of Todar Singh who died fighting the founder of Bhiwani Bhani Singh, both were rajputs.
- Tosham: Monuments in Tosham and rock inscriptions on Tosham hill range

=== Charkhi Dadri ===
Shiva temple of Nath Sampradaya on Kapoori ki Pahadi hill at Dadri, Jain temple at Ranila and Imlota Baba Mokarwala temple at Imolta.

=== Faridabad ===
Tilpat or Tilprastha village of pandavas, Anangpur village which was capital of Tomara Dynasty - also has paleolithic sites, Anangpur Dam, Badkhal Lake, Suraj Kund, Nahar Singh Mahal, Dabua Colony are some of tourist places in Faridabad.

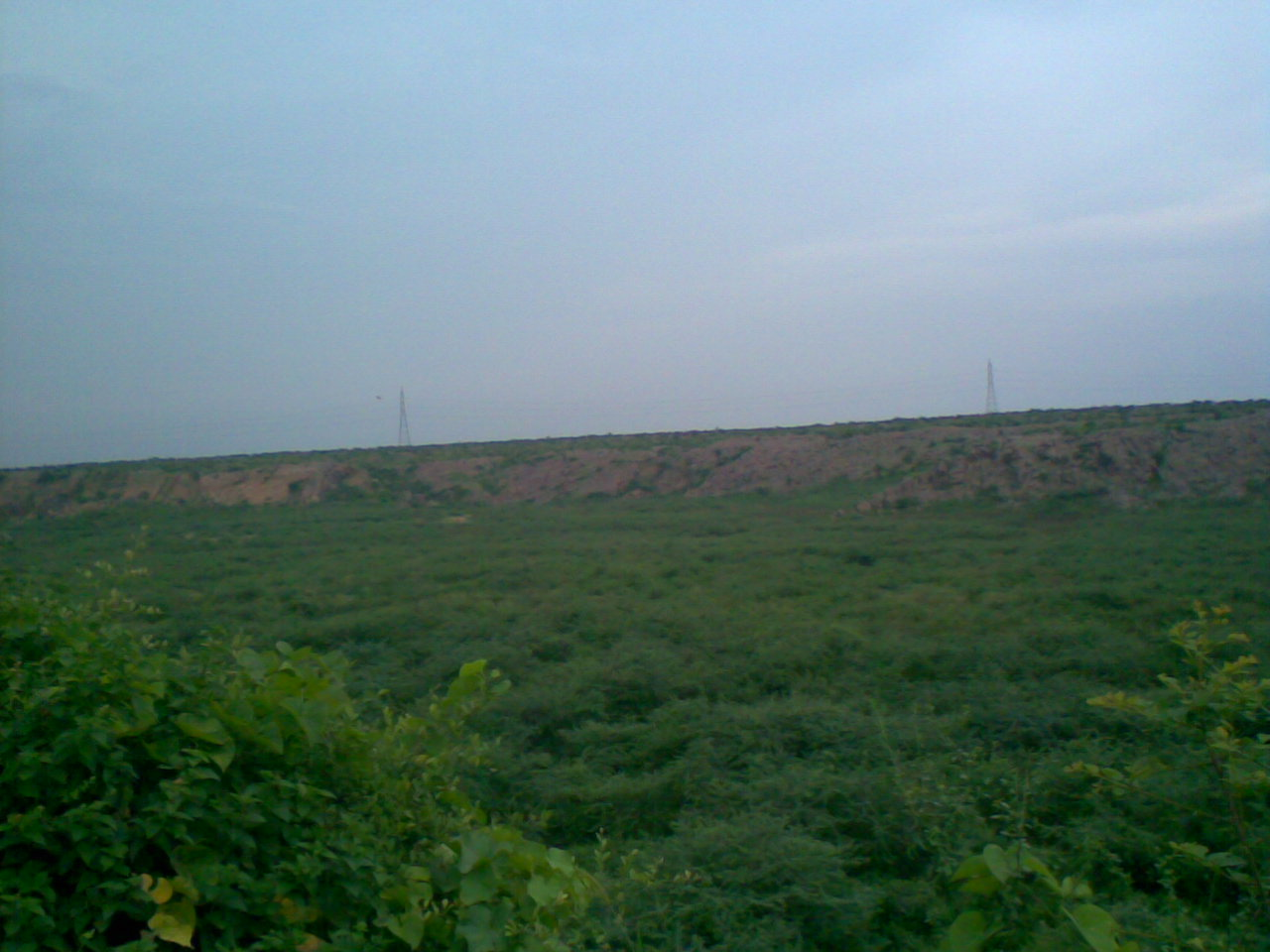
Dried Badkhal lake

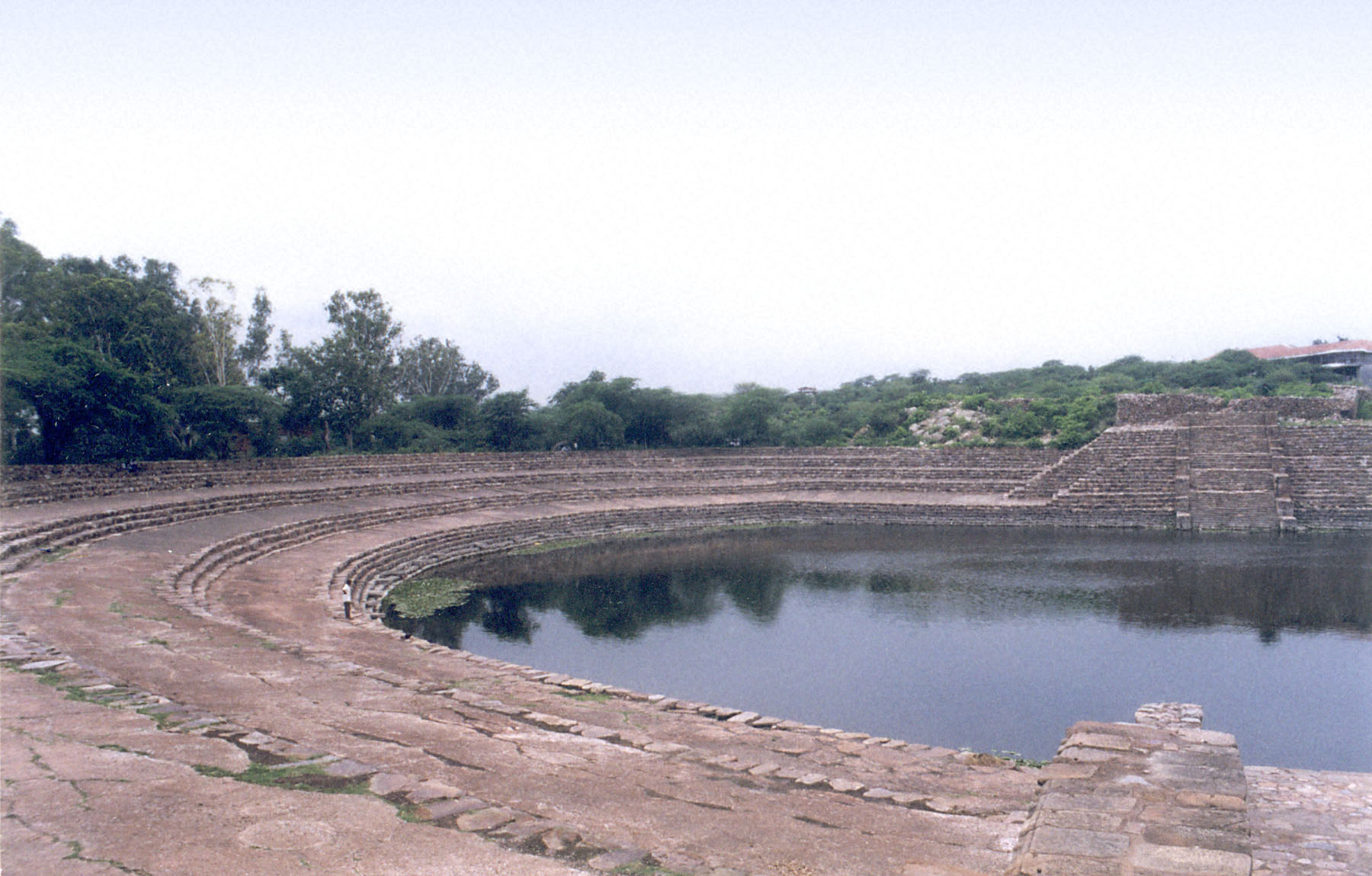
Suraj Kund

=== Fatehabad ===
Its original and ancient name is Dhannagarh after king Dhana Nand of Nanda Empire. Banawali, Bhirrana, Kunal, etc. are Indus-Saraswati Valley civilization sites.

=== Gurugram ===
- Gurugram: Bhondsi airstrip & Chandraswami Ashram,
- Along State Highway SH-15:
  - Najafgarh drain bird sanctuary on Sahibi river
  - Sultanpur National Park (at Sultanpur village on Gurugram-Jhajjar highway 15 km southwest of Gurugram city and 50 km south of Delhi)
  - Farrukhnagar: Sheesh Mahal palace, Gol Bavdi stepwell, Historical Boundary, etc.
- Pataudi: Pataudi Palace
- Along NH-248A, from north to south:
  - Jharsa: French memorial, Sheetla Mata Mandir Gurgaon (15th century), Shree 1008 Chander Prabhu Digambar Jain temple (15th century)
  - Badshahpur: Begum Samru's fort at Badshahpur, Badshahpur Stepwell & Badshahpur Akhara Stepwell, Dhumaspur Stepwell
  - Bhondsi nature camp
  - Damdama Lake
  - Ghamroj waterfall (only during rainy season)
  - Gurugram Wildlife & Leopard Safari
  - Sohna: Sohna hotspring, Gora Barak Mosque (15th century), Lal Gumbaz and Kala Gumbaz of Sohna (15th century), Nazam-ul-Haq dargah (15th century).

=== Hisar ===
Firoz Shah Palace Complex, Asigarh Fort, Blue Bird Lake, Deer Park, Hisar, Banawali and Rakhigarhi Indus Valley civilisation sites, Kanwari Indus Valley civilisation site.

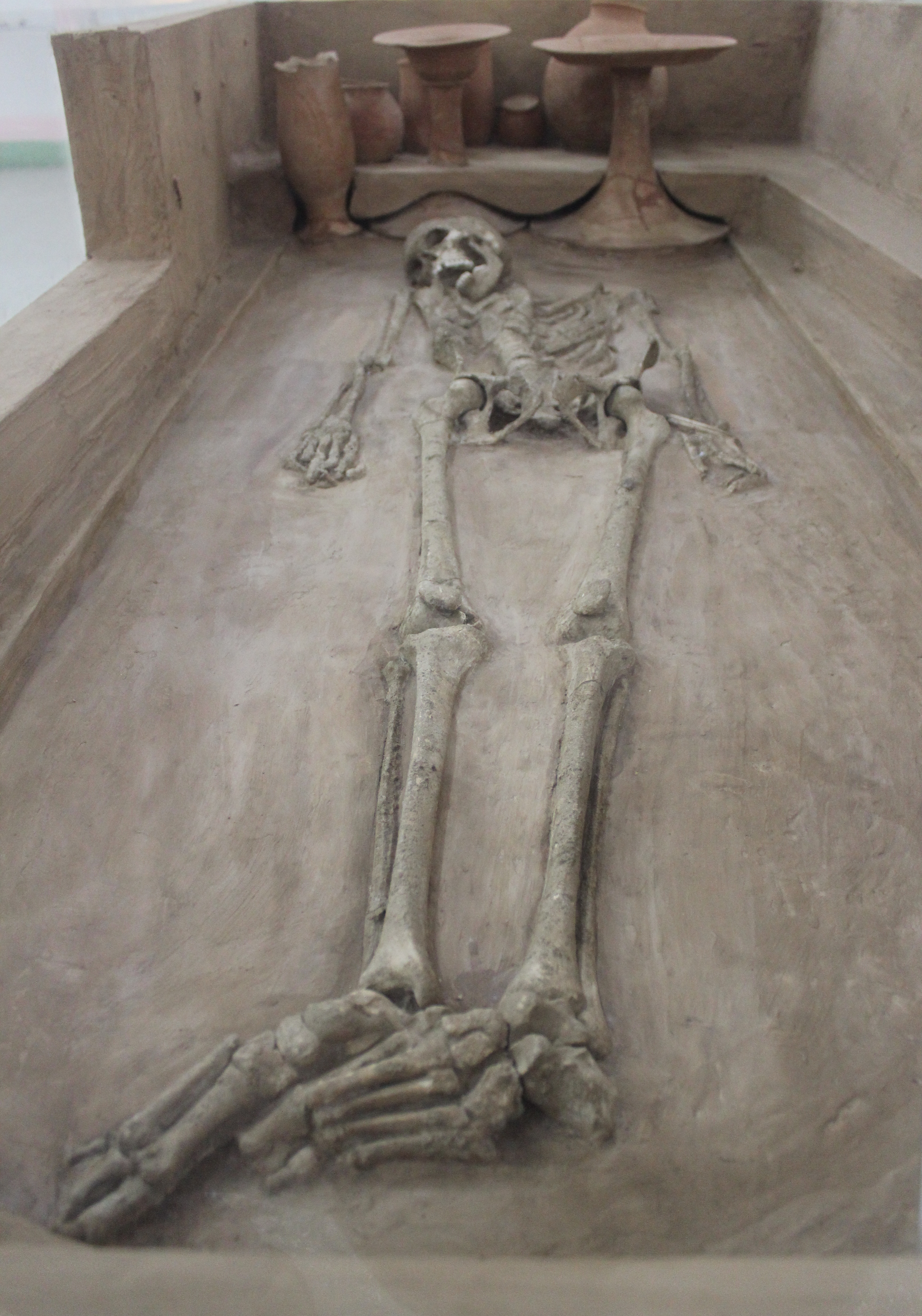
A skeleton from Rakhigarhi Indus Valley civilisation on display in the National Museum, New Delhi

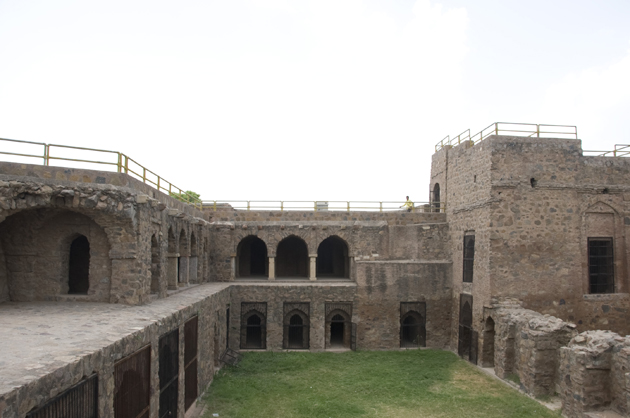
1354 CE fort of Firuz Shah Tughlaq at Hisar

=== Jhajjar ===
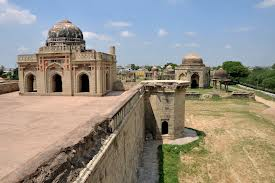
Group of tombs at Jhajjar.

- Jhajjar: Group of medieval tombs at Jhajjar
- Bhindawas Wildlife Sanctuary

=== Jind ===
Jind Fort of Sandhu Jat rulers of Jind State.

=== Kaithal ===
Since Kaithal means Kapisthal or "Abode of Kapi" - another name of Lord Hanuman, it has Lord Hanuman temple at the site where Lord Hanuman was born. Balu is Indus-Saraswati Civilization site.

=== Karnal ===
Karnal is city of King Karna were Second Battle of Tarain between Muhammad Ghori & Prithviraj Chauhan and Battle of Karnal between Nader Shah & Mughal Empire were fought.

=== Kurukshetra ===
Haryana is home to important religious sites dating to Vedic times. With a battery of temples and pilgrim centres concentrated in the 48 kos parikrama (92 miles) of land described in the epic Mahabharata, legend and mythology play an important role in the history of Kurukshetra, a place where the celestial song 'Bhagwad Gita,' is believed to have been delivered by Krishna to Arjuna. Jyotisar, Pehowa, Harsh Ka Tila, Karn Ka Tila, Abhimanyu Ka Tila, & Chakravyuha site, and Bhor Saidan Crocodile Breeding Centre are also must-visit sites.

Kurukshetra is also the location of Sheikh Chilli's Tomb.

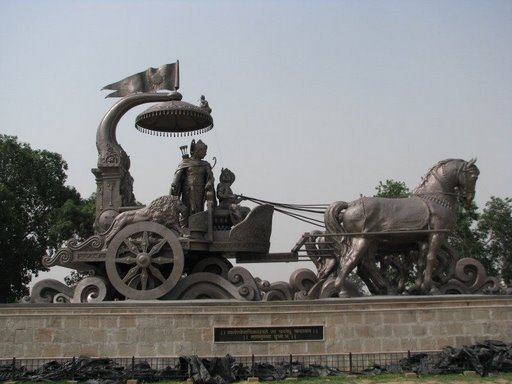
Bronze chariot of Lord Krishna and Arjuna at Kurukshetra

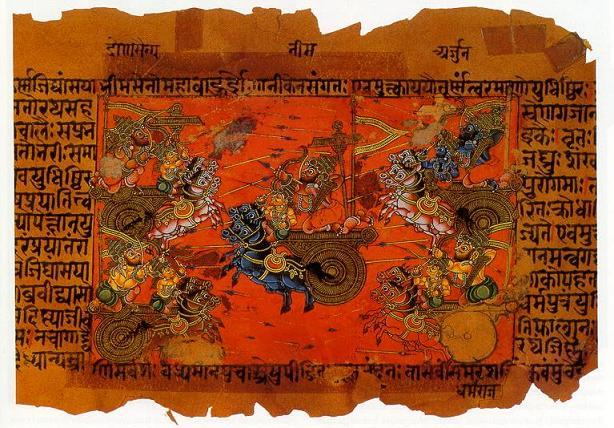
A manuscript of Mahabharata depicting the war at Kurukshetra

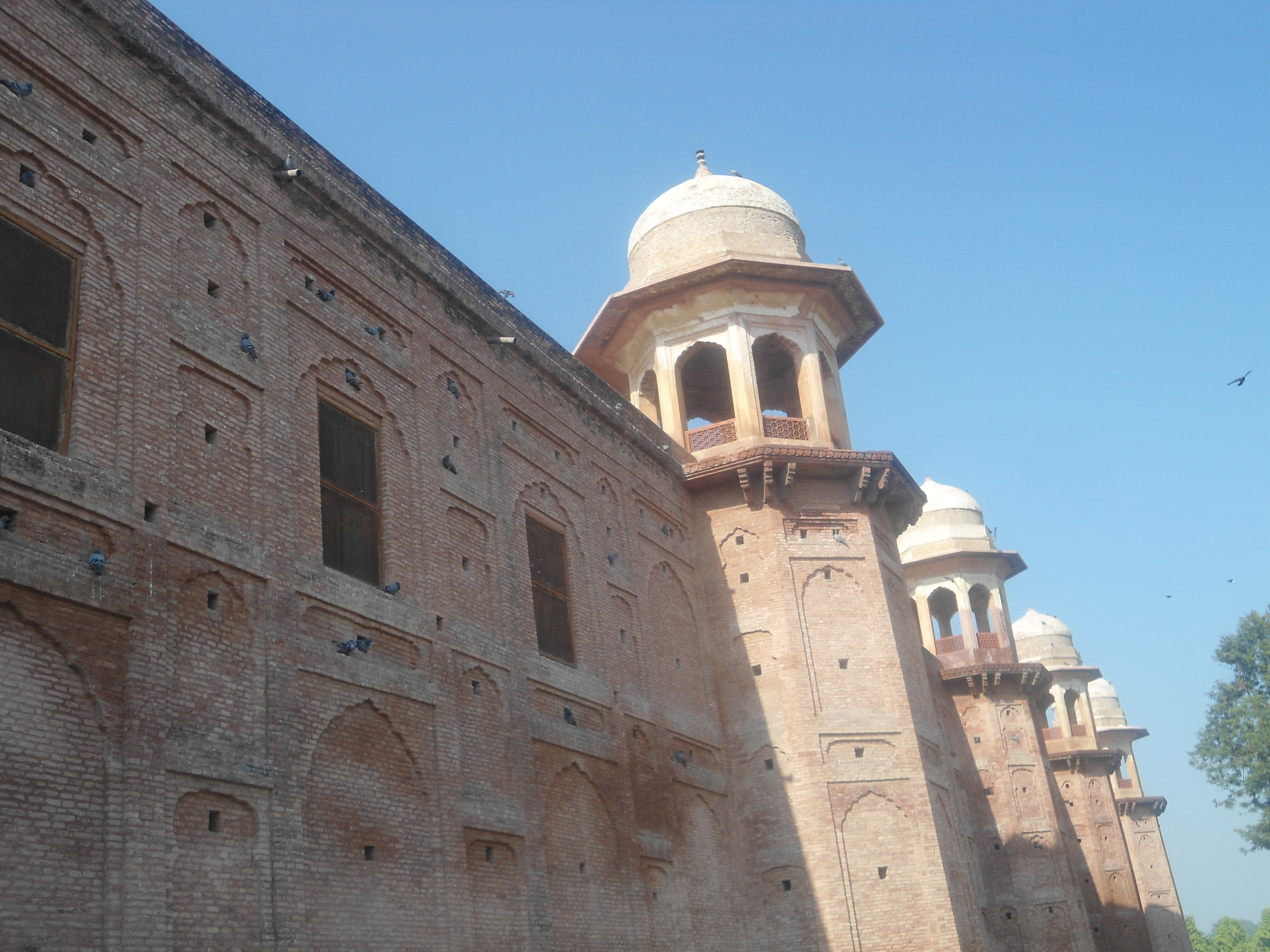
Sheikh Chilli's Tomb

=== Mahendragarh ===
Mahendragarh district has many sites including monuments & stepwell at Narnaul, Mahendragarh Fort, Madhogargh Fort and Dhosi Hill.

=== Nuh ===
Nuh district: Ghasera Fort and related monuments.

Kotla: Kotla Fort of Raja Nahar Khan, Kotla Bavdi stepwell, Kotla Waterfall, Kotla Lake (Ujina Lake or Dahar Lake),

Nalhar: Lokeshwar Nath Mahadev Mandir

=== Palwal ===
Palwal district has Gandhi Seva Ashram & museum.

=== Panchkula ===
Panchkula district is known for Mansa Devi temple, Saketri Shiv Mandir, Pinjore Gardens and Morni Hills.

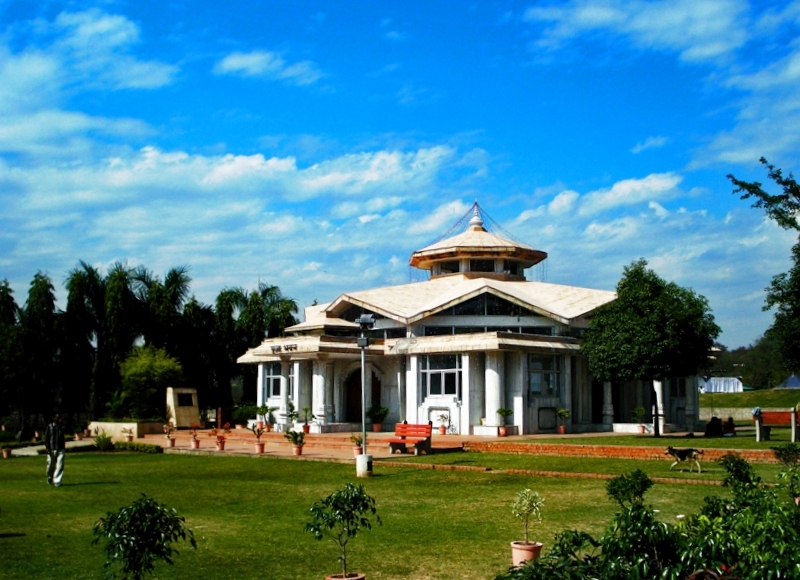
Yagya Shala, within the Mansa Devi temple complex

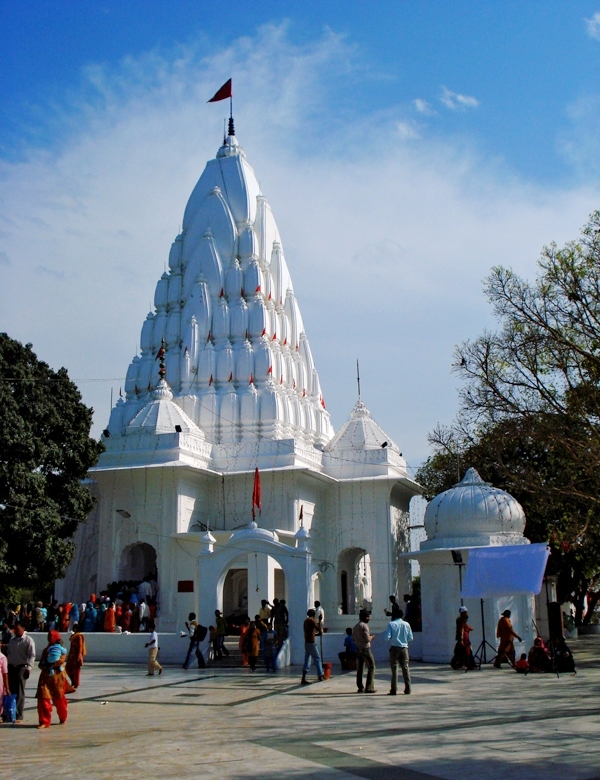
A temple in Mansa Devi Complex

=== Panipat ===
Panipat district has Kala Amb site of third battle of panipat war, Hemu's Samadhi Sthal of Hemu last Hindu ruler of Delhi,Tomb of Ibrahim Lodi, Kabuli Bagh Mosque, etc.

=== Rewari ===
Rewari district has Rewari Fort, Hemu's Haveli, Rewari Railway Heritage Museum, Rezang La memorial, Bharawas cantonment, Masani barrage, etc.

=== Rohtak ===
Rohtak district has Khokhrakot archaeological site & Tilyar lake at Rohtak. Maham has "Shahjahan ki Baoli" stepwell, Indus-Saraswati Civilization site, and Muslim tombs, etc. Farmana is Indus-Saraswati Civilization site.

=== Sirsa ===
Sirsa district has Sirsa Fort, Ottu barrage, etc.

=== Sonipat ===
Sonipat district witnessed the Banda Singh Bahadur's conquests against the mughals in Battle of Sonipat at Khanda

=== Yamunanagar ===
Yamunanagar district has Chaneti Buddhist Stupa - according to Hieun Tsang - built by King Ashoka, Sadhaura stupa, Adi Badri Saraswarti River Udgam Sthal, Kalesar National Park, etc.

== See also ==
- Divisions of Haryana
