= Tigrana, Bhiwani =

Tigrana
- Village
- Location in Haryana, India Tigrana (India)
- Coordinates: 28.862°N 76.137°E
- Country: India
- State: Haryana
- District: Bhiwani
- Mandal: Bhiwani

Population (2011)
  - Total: 10,712

Languages
  - Official: Hindi
- Time zone: UTC+5:30 (IST)

Tigrana is a village and Indus Valley Civilisation archaeological site in the Bhiwani district of Haryana, India. It lies on NH-709A (Loharu-Bhiwani-Mundhal-Jind route) approximately 7 kilometres (4.3 mi) north of the district headquarters town of Bhiwani.

== Demography ==
As of the 2011 Census of India, the village had 2,053 households with a population of 10,712 of which 5,703 were male and 5,009 female. All inhabitants are Hindus and the dominant castes are Rajputs, Brahmins, OBC and SC.For political representation purposes the village is part of Bawani Khera Assembly constituency and the Bhiwani-Mahendragarh Lok Sabha constituency.

== Culture and festivals ==
Tigrana has the temple Baba Paramhans Tigrana (BabaChorewala), located at the coordinates (28.858697,76.139496). Each year the temple celebrates a Hindu festival (melā) in the month of Shraavana (5th tithi the month of Shraavana and a 700-year-old lord shiva temple at the coordinates (28.862761,76.141006)

Known for its strong athletic culture, this village has many athletes, particularly in hockey and football. Tigrana’s youth train in a community that values sports as a path to pride and opportunity.

== Indus-Saraswati Valley Civilization ==
=== Mounds and history of excavation ===
In 2021, Central University of Haryana excavated Tigrana under the leadership of the Excavation Director Professor Dr. Narendra Parmar. It was carried out in association with the Deccan College Post-Graduate and Research Institute in which students from Haryana, Himachal Pradesh, Uttar Pradesh, Assam, Maharashtra, and Kerala also participated. Excavation is also aimed at finding out the source and trade network of bronze, copper, precious stones, jewellery, agriculture, economics, food habits and consumables, domestic and wildlife species, etc.

=== Dating ===
Dating and scientific tests were done at the laboratory of Birbal Sahni Institute of Palaeosciences (BSIP) at Lucknow. Artifacts were dated to be 5000 years old belonging to the "Early Harappan Phase".

=== Finds ===
==== Seal, script and language ====
A 5000 year old seal was found with 4 alphabets of the IVC script and language painted in black. This seal has 4 alphabets or characters, from right to left, a vertical fish shaped character, followed by two upward arrow shaped characters and finally a U-shaped character. Elsewhere, overall nearly 500 characters or alphabets of IVC script have been found which are yet to be deciphered.

==== Houses and pottery ====
A house made of 10 x 20 x 34 cm mud bricks was found which had one large room, courtyard, gallery or veranda, two small rooms and a kitchen. Pottery of baked clay found here includes kitchen utensils, such as thali (platter), matka (pot), bowl, "bela" (flat-bottomed wide and shallow bowl with rim), and other kitchen artifacts with attractive paintings.

==== Jewelry, precious stones, and metals ====
Bronze metal was found. Other finds include semi-precious stones such as agate, carnelian, sodalite, steatite (soapstone), faience, etc. which were used for making jewelry and lockets. Bangles and beads made from conch shell, baked clay beads and bangles, etc. were also found.

==== Agriculture and crop ====
BSIP tests concluded that 5000 years ago five crops, namely "bajara" (pearl millet), barley, "jawar" (sorghum), and pulses were cultivated at Tigrana. Some of the pottery is painted with the pictures of paddy (rice) crop. Finds include terracotta figurines of animals of which the bull figurines are most numerous indicating the abundance and importance of domesticated bull in the local agriculture and economy. Figurine of bullock cart was also found.

==== Trade ====
Carnelian found here, which is not found locally and is found around Gulf of Khambhat, indicates trade with Gujarat via shipping channels of paleo-Sarasvati River.

=== Context - related sites nearby ===
There are several Indus Valley Civilisation sites and cultures nearby.

- Meluhha
  - Indus–Mesopotamia relations
  - Conflict with the Akkadians and Neo-Sumerians
- Some of the List of Indus Valley Civilization sites within Haryana are as follows:
  - Bhirrana, 4 phases of IVC with earliest dated to 8th-7th millennium BCE
  - Kalibanga, an IVC town and fort with several phases starting from Early harappan phase
  - Rakhigarhi, one of the largest IVC city with 4 phases of IVC with earliest dated to 8th-7th millennium BCE
  - Rakhigarhi Indus Valley Civilisation Museum
  - Kunal, cultural ancestor of Rehman Dheri
  - Mitathal, 5 km northeast of Tigrana
- List of inventions and discoveries of the Indus Valley Civilization
  - Hydraulic engineering of the Indus Valley Civilization
  - Sanitation of the Indus Valley Civilisation
- Periodisation of the Indus Valley Civilisation
  - Pottery in the Indian subcontinent
  - Bara culture, subtype of Late-Harappan Phase
  - Cemetery H culture (2000-1400 BC), early Indo-Aryan pottery at IVC sites later evolved into Painted Grey Ware culture of Vedic period
  - Black and red ware, belonging to Neolithic and Early-Harappan phases
  - Sothi-Siswal culture, subtype of Early-Harappan Phase

== See also ==
- Haryana Tourism
- History of Haryana
- List of Monuments of National Importance in Haryana
- List of State Protected Monuments in Haryana
