= Mitathal =

- Archeological site
- Location within Haryana Location within India
- Coordinates: 28°53′31″N 76°10′11″E
- Country: India
- State: Haryana
- District: Bhiwani district
- Tehsil: Bhiwani

Population (2011)
  - Total: 7,434
- Time zone: UTC+5.30 (Indian Standard Time)

Mitathal is a village and Indus Valley Civilization (IVC) Archaeological sites in the Bhiwani tehsil of the Bhiwani district in the Indian state of Haryana. Part of Hisar division, it lies 12 kilometres (7.5 mi) north of the district headquarters Bhiwani and 249 kilometres (155 mi) from the state capital Chandigarh. As of the 2011 Census of India, the village had 1,448 households with a total population of 7,434 of which 4,002 were male and 3,432 female.For political representational purposes the village is part of Bawani Khera Assembly constituency and the Bhiwani-Mahendragarh Lok Sabha constituency.

== Archaeological site ==
Mitathal is situated on the alluvial plain near a channel between the Chautang and the Yamuna Rivers and is 25 to 30 kilometres (16 to 19 mi) from the hilly outcrops of Kaliana and Tosham, which are rich in quartzite and meta-volcanic rocks respectively. The site lies approximately 120 kilometres (75 mi) west-northwest of New Delhi, 10 kilometres (6.2 mi) northeast of the district headquarters Bhiwani and 1.5 kilometres (0.93 mi) northwest of Mitathal village.

The archaeological site dates to the Sothi-Siswal phase of the Indus Valley Civilisation. It was excavated in 1968 by the archaeologist, Suraj Bhan.

Sothi phase has recently been dated as early as 4600 BC, while Siswal starts at 3800 BC.

The earliest period I-A at the site is characterized by the occurrence of both local Chalcolithic pottery (Sothi-Siswal), as well as the classical Harappan pottery. The local pottery dominates the assemblage; it uses both the rotational and non-rotational technique. There are vases of various sizes, jars and bowls. The pottery shows fully developed Sothi-Siswal traits.

=== Historical significance ===
Mitathal is an important site for scholars investigating what Possehl (1992) has called the "Eastern Domain" of the Indus Valley or Harappan Civilization.

Recent studies have provided a fresh glimpse into this ancient settlement and the surrounding region during the later part of what is commonly termed the Mature Harappan period (ca. 2600-1900 B.C) of the Indus Valley Civilization.

==== Periodisation ====
- Early Harappan - Kalibangan-I Period - 3200-2800 BC
- Classic Harappan
- Period I -c. 2000-1900 B.C.
- Period II- c. 1900-1500 B.C.

=== Location and past research ===
Prior to excavation conducted by Kurukshetra University in 1968, under the direction of Suraj Bhan (Bhan 1969, 1975), copper artefacts, Indus-style pottery, beads and faience bangles were discovered at Mitathal.

Bhan’s excavations, although small in scale, revealed much about the site and the region. He identified a pre-Mature Harappan phase related to the Kalibangan I. Also he identified an early phase at the site of Harappa, which has been described as a ‘pre-defense’, 'or Kot Diji Phase'. This is also known in Haryana as 'Late Siswal culture'.

This was followed by a continuous sequence going through a Late Harappan phase. Bhan also defined the later Period I and Period II phases as belonging to c. 2000-1900 B.C. and c. 1900-1500 B.C., respectively.

==== Classical phase ====
The classical phase of the Indus Civilization (Mature Harappan) was indicated at the site by the presence of well-planned mud-brick structures, beads of carnelian, faience, steatite and terracotta, toy-cart wheels, wheeled toys, sling balls, discs with tapering ends, marbles and triangular cakes of terracotta as well as stone objects such as balls, hammer stones, saddle querns and mullers, and cubical stone weights.

The uppermost level (IIB) was designated the "Mitathal" culture (Late Harappan). Some Siswal/Kalibangan ceramic traditions survived and important finds from this phase include a celt, a parasu or axe, copper harpoon and a copper ring, which are known as Copper Hoards.

Bhan suggested that Indus culture transformed into the Ochre Coloured Pottery culture (OCP) and hinted that the possible genesis of the OCP lay in the Siswal phase (Bhan 1975: 3).

Mitathal’s twin mounds were christened as 1 and 2 by Suraj Bhan. He recorded Mound 1 as being 150 x 130 m in area and 5 m in height, while Mound 2 was 300 x 175 m in area and 3 m above the agricultural fields. The two mounds whose northern periphery was demarcated by a modern irrigation canal (the Dang Minor) were 10 m apart.

=== Recent research (2010) ===
Recent surveys show that large portions of the mounds have been destroyed due to agricultural activities. Mound 1 has been reduced both in the south and to the north.

On the south, the mound was levelled for nearly 40 metres (130 ft) and a section of nearly 1 metre (3 ft 3 in) is exposed. Mound 2 has likewise suffered extensive damage. A huge chunk measuring roughly 50 by 50 metres (160 ft × 160 ft) has been lost on its eastern side just in the past few years. Although this ongoing destruction is lamentable, it has provided a wealth of fresh archaeological materials for surface investigation.

==== Faience production ====
A large number of blue-green faience bangle fragments are found on the site’s surface; most are very fragmentary. Parallels are found for some Bangle types in the Harappa Phase (Period 3) levels at Harappa.

Ash pits and kilns of considerable size were observed on the northwestern and eastern peripheries of the site. One among these was a feature that is suspected to be a series of faience kilns. Their furnace walls exhibit vitrification indicative of extremely high temperature craft activities.

In his discussion of Indus faience production Kenoyer mentions (1994: 37) the discovery of white rocky quartz at the site of Harappa, which might have been the raw material crushed to make the silica powder. It is found along with the kilns. This, and the unusually large numbers of faience objects suggest that Mitathal might have been a major faience production centre.

Other common surface finds were small bits of copper and some copper-alloy objects such as bangle fragments.

Broken pieces and a few complete examples of stone querns and mullers were also abundant. The large majority of these stone artefacts were composed of a reddish-coloured quartzite with distinctive thin black seams.

=== Harappan Seal ===
A broken steatite seal of Mature Harappan period was discovered here in 2010. While a Harappan seal was collected previously from the surface of Rakhigarhi, no seal or sealing was found in Mitathal itself.

"The seal recovered is rectangular in shape, trapezoidal in section and inscribed on one side. The surviving portion measures 15.50 x 14.51 mm. The section of the top and bottom suggests that it was, when complete, convex backed with a perforated hole through the width. Seals of this type were used at the site of Harappa only during Period 3C (Meadow and Kenoyer 2001: 27) and this surface is dated to ca. 2100-1900 BC or the later part of what is commonly called the Mature Harappan Phase of the Indus Valley Civilization."

=== Context - related IVC sites and cultures nearby ===
The Indus Valley Civilization related nearby are as follows.

- Meluhha
  - Indus–Mesopotamia relations
  - Conflict with the Akkadians and Neo-Sumerians
- List of Indus Valley Civilization sites within Haryana are as follows:
  - Bhirrana, 4 phases of IVC with earliest dated to 8th-7th millennium BCE
  - Kalibanga, an IVC town and fort with several phases starting from Early harappan phase
  - Rakhigarhi, one of the largest IVC city with 4 phases of IVC with earliest dated to 8th-7th millennium BCE
  - Kunal, cultural ancestor of Rehman Dheri
  - Tigrana, Bhiwani, 5 km southwest of Mithathal

Wide context of the artifacts found at Mitathal is related to the following:

- List of inventions and discoveries of the Indus Valley Civilization
  - Hydraulic engineering of the Indus Valley Civilization
  - Sanitation of the Indus Valley Civilisation
- Periodisation of the Indus Valley Civilisation
  - Pottery in the Indian subcontinent
  - Bara culture, subtype of Late-Harappan Phase
  - Cemetery H culture (2000-1400 BC), early Indo-Aryan pottery at IVC sites later evolved into Painted Grey Ware culture of Vedic period
  - Black and red ware, belonging to Neolithic and Early-Harappan phases
  - Sothi-Siswal culture, subtype of Early-Harappan Phase

== See also ==
- Haryana Tourism
- History of Haryana
- List of Monuments of National Importance in Haryana
- List of State Protected Monuments in Haryana

== Bibliography ==
- V.N. Prabhakar, Tejas Garge, Randall Law (2010) Mitathal: New Observations based on Surface Reconnaissance and Geologic Provenance Studies. Man and Environment XXXV (1): 54-61, ISSN 0258-0446 academia.edu
- The Ancient Indus Valley : New Perspectrives, by Jane McIntosh (2008). ABC-CLIO, Santa Barbara, California. ISBN 978-1576079072
