= Banawali =

Archaeological site in Haryana, India

- Location within Haryana Location within India
- 29°35′54″N 75°23′31″E
- Type: Settlement
- Periods: Harappan 3A to Harappan 5
- Cultures: Indus Valley civilization
- Location: Baguwali, Haryana, India

Site notes
- Archaeologists: R. S. Bisht

Banawali is an archaeological site belonging to the Indus Valley Civilization period in Fatehabad district, Haryana, India and is located about 120 km northeast of Kalibangan and 16 km from Fatehabad. Banawali, which is earlier called Vanavali, is on the left banks of dried up Sarasvati River. Comparing to Kalibangan, which was a town established in lower middle valley of dried up Sarasvati River, Banawali was built over upper middle valley of Sarasvati River.

== Excavation ==
This site was excavated by R.S. Bisht (ASI) in 1974. The excavations revealed the following sequence of cultures:

- Period I: Pre-Harappan (Kalibangan)(c.2500-2300 BCE)
  - Period IA: Pre-defence Phase
  - Period IB: Defence Phase
  - Period IC: Transitional Phase (Proto-Harappan)
- Period II: Mature Harappan (c.2300-1700 BCE)
- Period III: Post-Harappan (Banawali-Bara)(c.1700-1500/1450 BCE)

=== Period I (c. 2500-2300 BCE) ===
Well-planned houses constructed out of kiln burnt and molded bricks. Pottery consisting of vase and jar is divided into two groups, based on the general design. Pottery assemblage is very similar to those of the Kalibangan I period.

=== Period II (c. 2300-1700BCE) ===
Defence wall of more than 105 m length, 4.5 m height, 6 m width was found at this site. Well planned Harappan style chess-board pattern fortified town, measuring 200m x 500m was established during this period. This fortified area consisted of two adjacent areas, one thought to be for ruling class and other one for common people. In the area meant for common people, house blocks with north-south thoroughfares cutting at right angles, which further connected by east-west lanes, reflecting urban nature of streets. Houses, which were constructed on both sides of lanes, were having rammed earth floor, mud plastered walls, rooms, kitchen, toilet. Houses were having storage facilities, similar to strong rooms found at Kuntasi

=== Period III (c.1700-1500/1450BCE) ===
This period is represented by Bara culture, which may be termed as post-Harappan or late contemporary Harappa.

== Architecture ==
Archaeological Survey of India has done excavation in this place revealed well constructed fort town of Harappan period overlaying an extensive proto-urban settlement of pre Harappan Period. A defence wall was also found with a height of 4.5 m and thickness of 6 m which was traced up to a distance of 105 m.

Houses, with rammed earthen floors, were well planned with rooms and toilets and houses were constructed on either sides of streets and lanes.

Near South-eastern area of fortification, flight of steps is found rising from 'Lower town' to Acropolis and ASI considers this as important formation. The staircase of 'lower town' is near a bastion looking construction.

=== Houses ===
In a multi roomed house having kitchen and toilet, several seals, weights were found, indicating that the owner of the house may possibly have been a merchant. A bigger house revealed a large number of gold beads, lapis lazuli, carnelian, tiny weights and a 'touch stone'-like stone with streaks of gold, indicating that the house belonged to a jeweler or ornament maker. Several houses in Banawali show evidence of fire altars, which were also associated with apsidal structures indicating ritualistic purposes.

== Artefacts recovered ==
S-shaped jars, cooking vessels, ovens, tandoors, painted earthen pots etc. Painted motifs include, peacocks, pipal leaves, tree, deer, star, fish, flowers, intersecting circles, checker board patterns, honey comb patterns. Harappan seals carrying pictures of Rhinoceros, wild goat, ibex, unicorn, composite animal with tiger body. Gold, copper, bronze pieces, gold beads, copper, lapis lazuli, bangles of shells etc. The pottery found, is comparable with Harappan pottery in fineness and pottery assemblage is very similar to assemblage of Kalibangan I.

== Importance ==
Among two most important finds during 1987-88 are

1. one is a burnished greyware decorated with two bucranian motifs in appliqué, which closely resembles more or less, similar bovine heads occurring in painting on Pre-Harappan pots from Kot-Diji, Kalibangan etc.
1. The other one is an unbaked clay figure of an which has deep cut criss-cross incisions on the back as well on one side of the neck, thereby imparting it an appearance of a horse, as the former may suggest the saddle and the latter the mane.

Other finds include ivory comb, a terracotta cake with an engraved ass, human figures - both male and female, a tortoise shell etc. Many items of gold, silver etc. have also been found.

== Decline ==
The decline of urban life at Banawali and Kalibangan appears to be all of a sudden.

== Other observations ==
The earlier bricks in Banawali had the Kalibangan ratio of 3:2:1, but later bricks had the ratio 4:2:1. One weight was found that weigh 87.855 grams, about 100 times 0.857 gram (a more common weight in Harappa). The wall surrounding this site was probably to face floods of Sarasvati River, and the wall collapsed due to water damage. Marine shells were found at Banawali as well as at Harappa, Kalibangan, which are far away from sea shore and such findings indicate internal trade between the regions during early Indus period. Seals were only found in lower town and not in citadel;several small stone weights and terracotta plough model was also found. Large number of female figurines are found at this site as well as at Mohenjadaro, Harappa. A touchstone bearing gold streaks was found, which was probably used for testing the purity of gold (a technique that is still being used in this area).

As is the practice, most of the finds have been reburied. However, a well of the Harappan era has been well preserved and stands as a testimony to the antiquity of the village.

== See also ==
- Indus Valley Civilization related
  - List of Indus Valley Civilization sites
    - Bhirrana, 4 phases of IVC with earliest dated to 8th-7th millennium BCE
    - Kalibanga, an IVC town and fort with several phases starting from Early harappan phase
    - Rakhigarhi, one of the largest IVC city with 4 phases of IVC with earliest dated to 8th-7th millennium BCE
    - Kunal, cultural ancestor of Rehman Dheri
  - List of inventions and discoveries of the Indus Valley Civilization
    - Hydraulic engineering of the Indus Valley Civilization
    - Sanitation of the Indus Valley Civilisation
  - Periodisation of the Indus Valley Civilisation
  - Pottery in the Indian subcontinent
    - Bara culture, subtype of Late-Harappan Phase
    - Cemetery H culture (2000-1400 BC), early Indo-Aryan pottery at IVC sites later evolved into Painted Grey Ware culture of Vedic period
    - Black and red ware, belonging to Neolithic and Early-Harappan phases
    - Sothi-Siswal culture, subtype of Early-Harappan Phase
  - Rakhigarhi Indus Valley Civilisation Museum
- History of Haryana
  - List of Monuments of National Importance in Haryana
  - List of State Protected Monuments in Haryana
