= Hakra Ware culture =

Indus Valley material culture

Hakra Ware
- Period: Early Harappan
- Dates: 3300–2800 BCE
- Preceded by: Transitional period
- Followed by: Mature Harappan

Map with Hakra Ware sites in red

Hakra Ware culture was a material culture which is contemporaneous with the early Harappan Ravi phase culture (3300–2800 BCE) of the Indus Valley in Northern India and eastern-Pakistan. This culture arises in the 4th millennium with the first remnants of Hakra Ware pottery appearing near Jalilpur on the Ravi River about 80 miles (130 km) southwest of Harappa in 1972. Along with this, numerous other areas including Kunal, Dholavira, Bhirrana, Girwas, Farmana and Rakhigarhi areas of India contained Hakra Ware pottery.

Hakra Ware pottery is characterised by handmade vessels and involves the use of mud-applique pottery and is distinguishable from the rest through the type of materials and surface treatment used. It also uses geometric, flora and fauna detailing in objects such as saucer shaped lids, handmade bowls, cups and jars. The Hakra Ware culture also made structures in the form of subterranean dwelling pits, cut into the natural soil. The walls and floor of these pits were plastered with the yellowish alluvium of the Hakra valley.

== Origin of the name 'Hakra Ware' culture ==
The term 'Hakra Ware' is derived from the geographical and functional aspects of the culture. 'Hakra' is named after the paleochannel of the Ghaggar-Hakra river that flows through India and Pakistan connecting both countries. This river flows close to the Cholistan area in Pakistan which is the location of the earliest dated Hakra Ware culture. The term 'Ware' in archaeological terms means pottery, referring to the clay pottery produced by this culture. Hence the name 'Hakra Ware'.

== Regions ==
Hakra Ware culture sits in the fourth millennium B.C. or 6,000 years before the present. It was found along the Ghaggar-Hakra river, which is a continuation of Saraswati-Ghaggar river, with the earliest remnants of Hakra Ware confirmed to be at Cholistan during the series of excavations at Kunal, Bhirana, Girwas, Farmana, Rakhigarhi and Cholistan area of India. In Cholistan areas, mud flats with fossilised sand dunes was a commonality where the pottery was found. More recent explorations carried out during the early 2000s have found some Hakra Ware sites in Pakistani Punjab beyond the Cholistan areas, extending to the Faisalabad area in the central section of the Ravi-Chenab doab and therefore calls for more research to be conducted.

== Features ==
Hakra Ware produced wide shouldered, globular shaped pottery with thick and under fired surfaces, that are either handmade or wheel made. The handmade pottery is generally thick and uneven with shades of red and light grey with a flat base. Whilst wheel made pottery the body is generally thin with a red to light-red shade. The distinctive features lie mainly in the materials and surface treatment of such pottery.

Surface treatment of Hakra Ware was an extensive range that included some painted with black paint, pottery buffed, multiple incised lines, chocolate coloured with wavy lines, dull red with incised lines, red coloured with wavy black outlines and white filing. Another few surface treatments used through Hakra Ware culture is the application of a particular mixture and use of black burnish. The mixture applied on the surface of the pottery consisted of a thick layer of a liquid mud paste and broken bits of pottery shards. While black burnish is used in 2 forms. One is glossy and black in colour generally applied to the surface of some pottery pieces. Whilst the other polish is generally applied on larger pottery and is non-glossy and black in colour.

== Excavation Process ==
The process of evacuation can be rendered to 7 main steps for an effective discovery. The first step involves a survey of the exact areas that need to be marked and dug up which is followed up by creating a layout and expected digging trenches are marked. The next process would involve excavation through the Wheeler–Kenyon method. This method requires the targeted area to be divided into grids that measure 10m by 10m and each grid is then divided further into 4 equal divisions. Then the trained excavators manually dig the assigned areas. While these excavators dig, the procedure involves meticulous process in the aim of uncovering the soil layer by layer. Once each layer is exposed it is then recorded to further understand the chronological time frame of the Hakra Ware cultures with relation to habitation, lifestyle and settlement. Whilst digging, artefacts that are discovered would be taken out of the soil and the surrounding soil will be sieved to make sure smaller artefacts are not missed, additionally the sieved soil will also be manually checked to ensure a thorough process. Once the pottery is uncovered it is washed and placed in a ward to be labelled.

== Discoveries and Regional differences in Hakra Ware ==
From a series of excavation surrounding the Indus Valley regional differences in the pottery and additional tools were found.

=== Kunal ===
This region is situated on the left bank of the river Saraswati which contained incised and mud-applique handmade pottery in black, white and red ware. Incised designs that were frequently found within Kunal were diamond-shaped cross-crosses and horned deities. Most of the pottery found was handmade with a few exceptions to wheel-made pottery.

Some other discoveries were micro blades of chalcedony and bone tools.

=== Bhirrana ===
Situated in the Fatehabad district of Haryana in the Ghaggar valley, Bhiranna has a distinct Early-Harrapan level that displays Hakra Ware culture. Most of the pottery included the expected repertoire of Mud Applique, incisions, Tan/Chocolate slipped ware, however were accompanied by Black Burnish, Brown, Red and black and white painting. On the pottery painted black and white, there were motifs of Peepal leaves which gained popularity later into Mature Harappan.

=== Farmana ===
This region is located at Rohtak district of Haryana the Ghaggar basin. In relation to Hakra Wares, most found had mud appliqué, incisions, plain and painted red wares. Recurring shapes found were vases, bowls, globular pots with handles, cups and storage jars that were rarely discovered.

Other than pottery, disc beads of steatite, terracotta beads and shell bangles were found, acting as an indication to the gradual transformation from Hakra to Mature Harappan.

=== Girawar ===
Located in the Rohtak District of Haryana, Girawar has the presence of both handmade and wheel-made Hakra Ware pottery. This included features of mud applique, incisions, black, brown and red slip. Unlike Faramana region very few black and white pottery were discovered. Other discoveries amongst the Hakra Ware, were terracotta and steatite beads and bangle fragments, similar to the ones found in the Farmana regions.

Additional discoveries included, copper rods, gold objects, copper fish-hooks and arrowheads.

=== Rakhigari ===
Termed as the largest Harappan site, Rakhigari is located on the river bed of Drisadvati River in the Hisar district of Haryana. The pottery recovered from this region contained Hakra Mud Applique and incisions. All pottery recovered had the characteristic bulbous body specific to Hakra Wares.

Similar to other regions, steatite beads and bone tools were also recovered as well.

== Settlements ==
Recent excavations in the regions of Kunal, Cholsitan and Bhirrana has revealed many things in regards to the lifestyle of the people practising Hakra Ware culture. During excavations of Hakra Ware between Pakistan and India, many objects that were unearthed have revealed that Hakra Ware people originated from Cholistan region and slowly spread out towards Kunal and hence the result of Hakra Ware to be found in several of places such as Bhirana, Girwas, Farmana and Rakhigarhi. A prospective theory that was reported is the possibility that Hakra Ware people came to Kunal with the intention of new settlement and many findings have supported this evidence along with the fact that there has been a stable and continuous settlement for several years. Along with geographical movements from the Hakra Ware people, excavators at several Hakra Ware excavations were able to decipher the occupations and skillset of the people practising this culture through the pottery that was produced. It was further concluded that people practising Hakra Ware were most probably "good artisans" who were skilled and resourceful with their use of various raw materials. Along with the usage of mud, sherds from scraps and usage of bone tools to carve incised lines, people were able to produce other items such as beads and bangles that aided with trade.

Another significant discovery from excavations especially Bhirrana is the continuous presence of circular pits dug in the soil. Such pits were able to provide information about living environments as most of their lifestyle surrounded these pits as they were used for cooking, industrial activities such as melting copper, and religious purposes. Moving forward a few years into the Harrappan period, when Hakra Ware flourished, people started migrating out of dwelling pits and built houses made of sun-baked bricks [6]. Later, during the mature Harappan period, the settlement progressed into a city layout. The dietary behaviours were also found through the excavations of Hakra Ware and was found that people were likely to be both herbivores and carnivores. This conclusion was derived from the discovery of bones of small and big animals and grains. The more superficial the soil layers became the larger the bones of animals became and therefore it was concluded that populations practising Hakra Ware culture consuming largely small animals such as birds and rabbits. The evidence of charred bones indicated that the mode of consumption was through roasting.

== Proposed Chronology of Hakra Ware culture ==
The proposed time period for the existence of Hakra Ware was 3500 B.C. – 3100/3000 B.C as the period following it (Kot Dijit), was dated as 3370 B.C. – 2900 B.C. However, after dating the materials used in the Hakra Ware artefacts in Bhirrana, this was proposed to exist in an earlier time of 8th millennium B.C. Also Kalibangan, Rakhigarhi and Girwar produced dates of late 5th and early 4th millennium B.C. as starting point of Hakra Culture there. So, we can now date Hakra phase of Early Harappan Culture at least from early 6th to late 4th millennium B.C.

From the findings at Bhirrana, a timeline was compiled to help visualise where Hakra Ware culture sat amongst the rest of the periods that occurred. The 2 periods before Hakra Ware were Period 1 (Neolithic) that existed during 7500–6000 BCE and Period IIA (Transitional Period) that's existed during 6000–4500. Then Period IIB (Early-Harappan) spanned across 3300–2800 BCE which is then preceded by Period III (Mature-Harappan) followed by Period IV (Late-Harappan). These periods were present from 3000 to 1900 BCE and 1900–1600 BCE respectively.

== See also ==
- Periodisation of the Indus Valley Civilisation
- Rakhigarhi

== Sources ==
- Coningham; Young (2015), The Archaeology of South Asia: From the Indus to Asoka, c.6500 BCE–200 CE, Cambridge University Press
- Dikshit, K.N. (2013), "Origin of Early Harappan Cultures in the Sarasvati Valley: Recent Archaeological Evidence and Radiometric Dates" (PDF), Journal of Indian Ocean Archaeology (9), archived from the original (PDF) on 18 January 2017
- Mani, B.R. (2008), "Kashmir Neolithic and Early Harappan: A Linkage" (PDF), Pragdhara 18, 229–247 (2008), archived from the original (PDF) on 18 January 2017
- Sarkar, Anindya (2016), "Oxygen isotope in archaeological bioapatites from India: Implications to climate change and decline of Bronze Age Harappan civilization", Scientific Reports, 6 26555, Bibcode:2016NatSR...626555S, doi:10.1038/srep26555, PMC 4879637, PMID 27222033
- Singh, Upinder (2008), A History of Ancient and Early Medieval India: from the Stone Age to the 12th century, New Delhi: Pearson Education, pp. 109, 145, 153, ISBN 978-81-317-1120-0
