= Kuntasi =

- Archeological site
- Location within India Location within Gujarat
- Coordinates: 22°53′30″N 70°35′58″E
- State: Gujarat
- Time zone: UTC+5.30 (Indian Standard Time)

Kuntasi is an archaeological site (locally known as Bibi-no-Timbo) which is identified as a port belonging to the Indus Valley civilization. This site is located on the right bank of Phulki River, about 2 km south-east of Kuntasi village and 30 km from Morbi in Maliya taluka of Morbi District in Gujarat state of India. It is five km inlandward from present shore line. It was first reported by P. P Pandya and later thoroughly explored by Y. M. Chitalwala. The excavations revealed two periods of occupation. Period I is assigned to the Mature Harappan phase (c. 2200–1900 BCE) and the Period II is assigned to the Late Harappan phase (c.1900–1700 BCE). This site was identified as a jetty and a manufacturing centre.

== Area ==
Kuntasi had 2 hectares of walled town and unwalled suburbs. A stone platform ran along the western side of wall. It appears to have been a planned settlement, established for production, storage and movement of goods.

== Architecture ==
The excavated site consists of two parts, a two hectare walled settlement and unwalled suburbs. A stone platform ran along the western side of the wall, and adjoining this inside the walled town were a substantial industrial complex and a number of storage facilities. A centrally placed house with a number of rooms, including a private kitchen was found. Other houses lay in the north and west of the walled area, mostly large rectangular buildings. The houses in Kuntasi were built on stone foundations with walls of mud bricks in Harappan proportion but unusually large. In the southwestern corner, a large isolated room was found, which has been identified as a kitchen serving most of the settlement. The buildings were arranged around a large open space. However, the town of Kuntasi lacked Citadel which was prominent in bigger towns like Kalibangan, Dholavira, Banawali etc. belonging to Indus Valley Civilisation. A jetty (platform) for unloading and loading cargo on the boats going down the creek is also identified.

=== Double wall ===
Kuntasi had a double wall, built out of boulders and mud, separated by a passage with a width of about 20 meters. Southwestern corner of town had a tower, and eastern side had a gate flanked by guard chambers, presumably to control public access to the walled area.

== Artifacts found ==
Pottery with drawings were found. Two cylindrical stone anchors, suggesting seaborne activity was also found. A small pot with copper hoard, few copper bangles, two finger rings and more than thousand micro beads of steatite were also found. Other artifacts include cubical chart weights, tools made of bones, terracotta toy carts, agate and carnelian goods.

== Importance ==
Kuntasi was similar to Lothal, another port town of IVC, though on a smaller scale. Lapis Lazuli was found in unusual large quantity in this settlement, indicating that it was exported to Mesopotamia, as lapis lazuli was known to have been an important export item from IVC to Mesopotamia. It is also suggested that a land route connected this site to Lothal via Rangpur, Gujarat.

== See also ==
- Hydraulic engineering of the Indus Valley Civilization
- Indus Valley civilization
- List of Indus Valley Civilization sites
- List of inventions and discoveries of the Indus Valley Civilization
