= Balu, Kaithal =

Human settlement in India

Balu
- Location within Haryana Location within India
- 29.65°N 76.366°E
- Type: Settlement
- Cultures: Indus Valley civilization
- Location: Haryana, India

Balu is a small archeological site attributed to the Indus Valley Civilisation, located some 22 kilometres (14 mi) south of the city of Kaithal in the Indian state of Haryana. There are three Patti in village. Many castes live in the village, most among them are Hindu Jats (mainly Bidhan, Rapria, Boora). It is one of the biggest villages of Haryana and has three sarpanches. According to Census 2011, Balu has population of nearly 18,000 and nearly 2,800 houses residing. There are various facilities in village consists of hospital, power house, schools and transport services. Mostly, people of the village lives well above poverty and healthy environment .It has around 10 schools, a small hospital, water tank, library and ground including anaj mandi.

== Historical significance ==
This is a small fortified settlement which has yielded several plant remains. The village is known as one of the bravest and known for defeating king of patiala in a fight in past

== Floral remains ==
Several plant remains were found here include various types of barley, wheat, rice, horsegram, green gram, various types of pea, sesamum, melon, watermelon, grapes, dates, garlic etc. (Saraswat and Pokharia - 2001–2) which is comparable to a nearby IVC site Kunal, Haryana revealed remains of rice (probably wild).

=== Earliest garlic ===
The plant remains found here include a garlic specimen, recognised as the earliest evidence of garlic. This is the earliest evidence of garlic cloves in south & south-east Asia, and it dates to the Mature Harappan period.

== See also ==
- Indus Valley civilization related
  - Hydraulic engineering of the Indus Valley Civilization
  - List of Indus Valley Civilization sites
  - List of inventions and discoveries of the Indus Valley Civilization
  - Periodisation of the Indus Valley civilisation
  - Pottery in the Indian subcontinent
  - Rakhigarhi Indus Valley Civilisation Museum
- History of Haryana
  - List of Monuments of National Importance in Haryana
  - List of State Protected Monuments in Haryana
