= Rakhigarhi =

Archaeological site in Haryana, India

- Rakhi Garhi
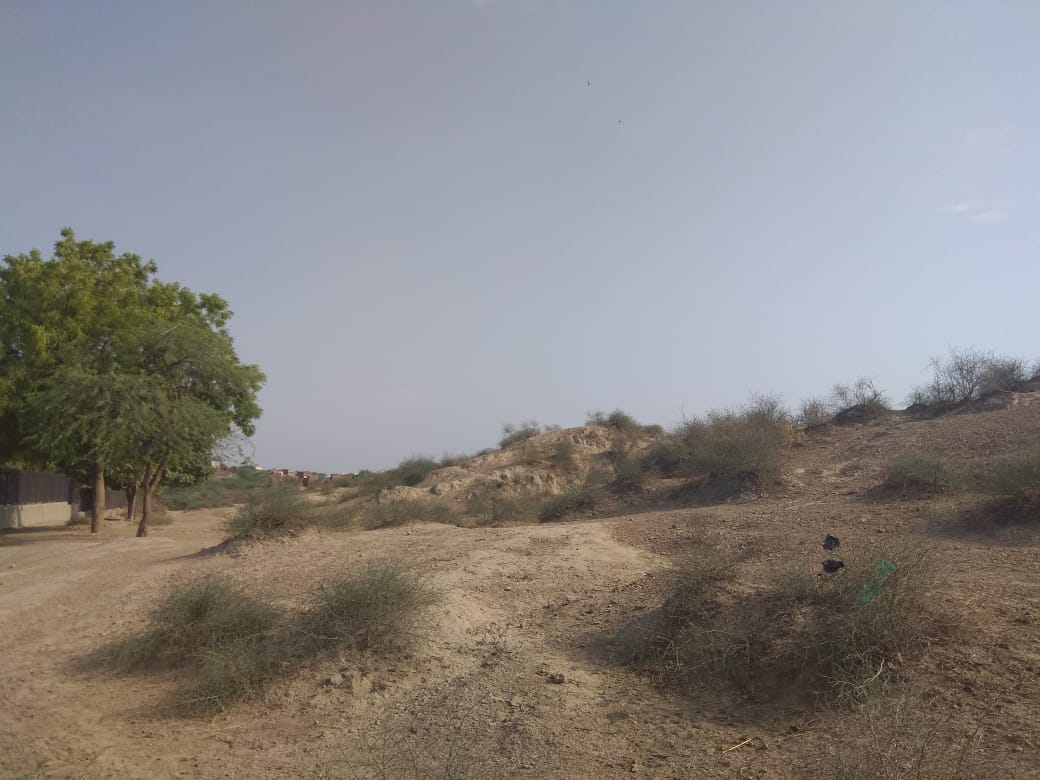

- Location within Haryana Location within India Location within South Asia
- 29°17′35″N 76°6′51″E
- Type: Settlement
- Cultures: Indus Valley Civilisation
- Location: Hansi district, Haryana, India

History
- Built: c. 3500 BC

Site notes
- Area: 350 ha (860 acres)
- Excavation dates: 1963, 1997–2000, 2012–2016, 2021–present

Rakhigarhi or Rakhi Garhi (Hindi: [ɾaːkʰiːɡəɽʰiː]) is a village and an archaeological site in the Hansi district of the northern Indian state of Haryana, situated about 150 km northwest of Delhi. It is located in the Ghaggar River plain, some 27 km from the seasonal Ghaggar river, and belonged to the Indus Valley Civilisation, being part of the pre-Harappan (6000?/4600-3300 BC), early Harappan (3300-2600 BC), and the mature phase (2600-1900 BC) of the Indus Valley Civilisation.

It was one of the five largest settlements of the ancient civilisation, with most scholars prior to 2014 reporting it to have been between 80 hectares and 100+ hectares in area, (Note: Size: Allchin & Erdosy 1995, p. 78: "Rakhigarhi at 80 hectares is the largest site followed by Banawali at 25 hectares."; Kenoyer 1998, p. 49: "Within a few hundred years the thriving town had grown six times larger, covering an area of over 150 hectares [...] civilization: Mohenjo-daro (+200 ha), Harappa (+ 150 ha), Ganweriwala and Rakhigarhi (+80 ha) and Dholavira (100 ha)."; Possehl 2002, p. 72: "The site is about 17 meters in height. The southern face of the mounds is rather abrupt and steep. The northern side slopes down to the surrounding plain. The contours of the site have led the excavator to divide up the place into five mounds (RGR-1 through 5). RGR-6, a Sothi-Siswal site known as Arda, was probably a separate settlement. I have visited Rakhigarhi and believe that it is 80 hectares in size."; Heitzman 2008, p. 35: "They include Mohenjodaro (with a city core of about 100 hectares, and suburbs possibly covering more than 200 hectares) in Sind; Harappa (more than 150 hectares) in the center of Pakistani Punjab; Dholavira (more than 100 hectares) in Gujarat; Ganweriwala (82 hectares) in Pakistani Punjab near the border with Rajasthan; and Rakhigarhi (between 80 and 105 hectares) in Haryana."; Wright 2009, p. 133: "Rakhigarhi was over 100 hectares in size."; Coningham & Young 2015, p. 183 Quote: Mohenjo-daro covered an area of more than 250 hectares, Harappa exceeded 150 hectares, Dholavira 100 hectares and Ganweriwala and Rakhigarhi around 80 hectares each.") comprising five closely-integrated archaeological mounds as the extent of mature-phase urban habitations. A sixth mound situated in the vicinity, but outside of this group, represented a distinct older period and was likely a separate settlement, while a seventh mound was a cemetery or burial ground belonging to the mature phase. The discovery of two more mounds (in addition to the seven that were already known)—respectively situated approximately 1 km north/east and 1 km south/west of the main group of mounds—was made in 2014: it consequently was claimed by the Archaeological Survey of India (ASI) that the discovery made Rakhigarhi the largest-known site of the Harappan Civilisation, with the spread of archaeological remains being encompassed within a total area of 300 to 350 hectares. However, this figure includes outlying remains which were likely not all integrated as part of a single urban settlement at any singular time.

Initial excavations at the site happened in the 1960s, followed by further excavations in the late 1990s, however more sustained excavations have taken place from 2012 to 2016 and 2021 to 2022. though much of the area is yet to be excavated (Note: Damini Nath (2020), At Haryana's Harappan site of Rakhigarhi, anxiety trumps history, The Hindu, 27 February 2020.) and published. Other related excavation sites in the area are Mitathal and the smaller site Lohari Ragho, which are still awaiting excavation.

DNA-tests by Shinde et al. (2019) on a single skeleton show that the DNA did not include any traces of steppe ancestry, in line with the Aryan migration theory, which says that Indo-Aryans migrated to India from the steppes after the Harappan civilisation had started to disintegrate.

== Site characteristics ==
=== Location ===
It is located in the Ghaggar plain, some 27 km from the seasonal Ghaggar river. Today, Rakhigarhi is a small village in Haryana State, India. (Note: Census of India, 2011) According to Jane McIntosh, Rakhigarhi is located in the valley of the prehistoric Drishadvati River that originated in Siwalik Hills. Chautang is a tributary of Sarsuti river which in turn is a tributary of Ghaggar river.

=== Site size and number of mounds ===
Most scholars, including Gregory Possehl, Jonathan Mark Kenoyer, Raymond Allchin and Rita P. Wright believe Rakhigari to have been between 80 hectares and 100+ hectares in size. According to Nath et al. (2015), "[a]rchaeological remains at Rakhigari extend over a radius of [300 hectares (3.0 km^{2})] encompassing a set of seven mounds of which 1 to 5 are integrated while a few are removed from each other."

The mounds are numbered following the naming convention of "RGR-x" e.g. RGR-1 to RGR-11. Until 2014, seven mounds were known. The 2014 excavation discovered two more mounds, RGR-8 and RGR-9, situated east and west of the main site, and largely destroyed for cultivation. According to Vasant Shinde each mound has a size of 25 hectares, taking the total site size to 350 hectares (3.5 km^{2}), and thus making Rakhigarhi largest Indus Valley Civilisation site by overtaking Mohenjodaro (300 hectares) by 50 hectares. (Note: Deepender Deswal (2015), Rakhigarhi site being plundered due to lack of protection, The Tribune India, 16 April 2015.)

It is likely that not all mounds in Rakhigarhi belong to the same Indus Valley settlement. Five closely-integrated mounds, namely RGR-1 through RGR-5, have been considered as representing the major extent of mature-phase urban settlement, extending over 80 to 100+ hectares. In addition there was RGR-6, also known as "Arda", a mound situated in the vicinity but outside of this group, to the northwest: it "was probably a separate settlement", as it represented primarily an older period of occupation. (It was also re-occupied, after a long period of abandonment, more than two thousand years later during the Kushan Period.) RGR-7 was another mound lying to the north, representing a cemetery or burial ground belonging to the mature phase. The discovery of two more mounds (in addition to the seven that were already known)—respectively situated approximately 1 km north/east and 1 km south/west of the main group of mounds—was made in 2014: it consequently was claimed by the Archaeological Survey of India (ASI) that the discovery made Rakhigarhi the largest-known site of the Harappan civilisation, with the spread of archaeological remains being encompassed within a total area of 300 to 350 hectares. However, this figure includes outlying remains which were likely not all integrated as part of the same urban settlement at any singular time.

=== Dating ===
According to Tejas Garge the earliest settlements in Rakhigarhi predate the Indus Valley Civilization, with a "tentative chronological bracket" of "6000(?)-4600-3800" for the "lowermost levels" of Rakhigarhi, and "3200-2800 B.C.E." for the remainder of Period I. According to Possehl not all mounds in Rakhigarhi belong to the same Indus Valley settlement, stating that "RGR-6, a Sothi-Siswal site known as Arda, was probably a separate settlement." Mounds RGR1 to RGR-6 are residential sites belonging to "pre-formation age early Harappan" era, while mound RGR-7 is a burial site where human skeletons were found. (Note: Deepender Deswal (2018), Harappan site in Hisar draws interest of archaeologists, The Tribune India, 18 September 2021.)

ASI has carbon dated mound labelled RGR-1, RGR-2, RGR-6 and RGR-7. The RGR-6 has two layers of Preharappan Phase dating to 5,640 years before present (BP) and 5,440 (BP). The RGR-1 has Early Harappan Phase dating to 5,200 and 4,570 years BP. The RGR-2 also has Early Harappan Phase dated to 5,200 and 4,570 years as well as two additional samples belonging to Mature Harappan Phase dating to 4,040 and 3,900 years BP. RGR-7, which is a cemetery or a burial site from Mature Harappan Phase, dates back to 4600 BP. (Note: T.S. Subramanian (2015), "Virtual Harappans to come alive". The Hindu. 3 May 2015. Archived from the original on 20 September 2019.)

In 2014 six radiocarbon datings from excavations at Rakhigarhi between 1997 and 2000 were published by archaeologist Amarendra Nath, corresponding to the Pre-formative, Early Harappan, and Mature Harappan phases. Mound RGR-6 revealed a Pre-formative stage designated as Sothi Phase with the following two datings: $6420 \pm 110$ and $6230 \pm 320$ years before present, converted to $4470 \pm 110$ B.C.E. and $4280 \pm 320$ B.C.E.

=== Nearby sites and cultures ===
Rakhigarhi, being the largest town and regional trade centre of IVC era, is surrounded by numerous IVC sites nearby in Haryana, Rajasthan and Punjab along the Gagghar-Hakra river course. The important ones among those are the Bhirrana (4 phases of IVC with earliest dated to 8th-7th millennium BC) 86 km northwest, Kunal (belonging to Kunal cultural which is the cultural ancestor of Rehman Dheri site) 75 km northwest, Siswal (belonging to Sothi-Siswal culture dated to 3800 BC, contemporaneous to Early-Harappan Phase) 75 km west, and Kalibangan (another large regional IVC city with several phases starting from Early harappan phase) 235 km west, and few more.

There are many other important archaeological sites in this area, in the old river valley to the east of the Ghaggar Plain. Among them are Kalibangan, Kunal, Balu, Bhirrana, and Banawali.

== Excavations ==
By 2020, only 5% of the site had been excavated by the ASI and Deccan College.

=== Chronology of excavations ===
While the earliest excavation of IVC sites started from Harappa in 1921-1922 and Mohenjo-daro in 1931, the excavations at Rakhigarhi were first carried out in 1969, followed by more excavations in 1997–1998, 1998–1999 and 1999–2000, between 2011–2016 and 2021 onward. There are 11 mounds in Rakhigarhi which are named RGR-1 to RGR-11, of which RGR-5 is thickly populated by establishment of Rakhishahpur village and is not available for excavations. RGR-1 to RGR-3, RGR6 to RGR9 and some part of RGR-4 are available for excavations.

In 1963, Archaeological Survey of India (ASI) began excavations at this site, and, though little has been published about the excavations.

In 1969, Kurukshetra University's team studied and documented the site led by its Dean of Indic studies Suraj Bhan.

In 1997–98, 1998–99 and 1999–2000, ASI team began to excavate the site again, which was led by its director Amrender Nath who published his findings in scholarly journals. After 2000, excavations were stopped for years because of a CBI investigation on the misuse of funds. Much of the findings are donated to the National Museum, New Delhi.

From 2011 to 2016, Deccan College carried out several substantial excavations led by its then Vice-Chancellor and archaeologist Vasant Shinde, several members of the team published their findings in various academic journals.

From 2021 onward, more excavation by ASI commenced. Central University of Haryana and Vasant Shinde also expressed interest in commencing excavation.

=== Discoveries ===
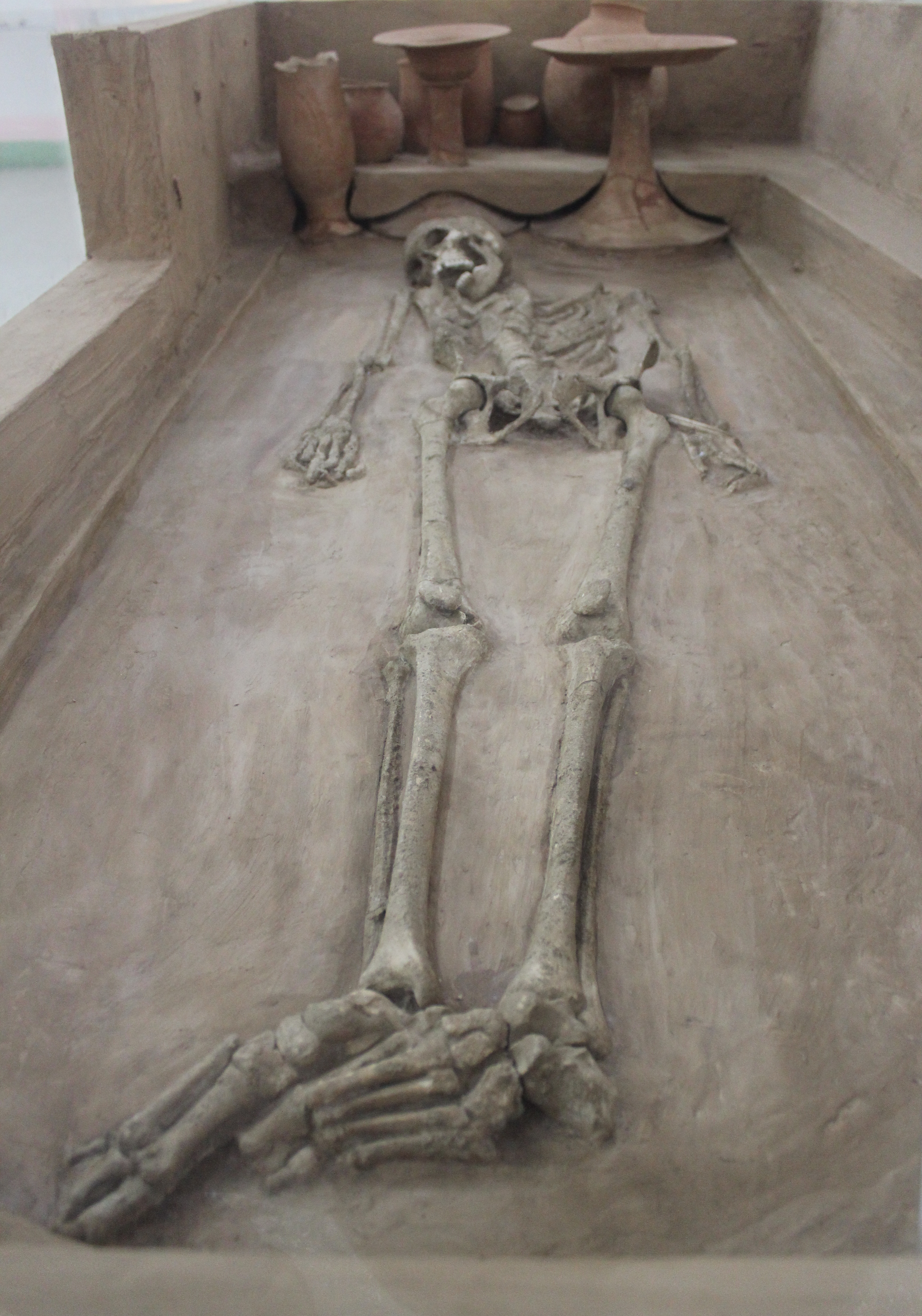
The skeleton of a female found at Rakhigarhi and now on display in the National Museum.

Findings confirm both early and mature Harappan phases and include 4,600-year-old human skeletons, fortification and bricks.

==== Planned city ====
The ASI's detailed excavation of the site revealed the size of the lost city and recovered numerous artefacts, some over 5,000 years old. Rakhigarhi was occupied at Early Harappan times. Evidence of paved roads, drainage system, large rainwater collection, storage system, terracotta bricks, statue production, and skilled working of bronze and precious metals have been uncovered. Jewellery, including bangles made from terracotta, conch shells, gold, and semi-precious stones, have also been found.

Digging so far reveals a well planned city with 1.92 m wide roads, a bit wider than in Kalibangan. The pottery is similar to Kalibangan and Banawali. Pits surrounded by walls have been found, which are thought to be for sacrificial or some religious ceremonies. There are brick lined drains to handle sewage from the houses. Terracotta statues, weights, bronze artefacts, comb, copper fish hooks, needles and terracotta seals have also been found. A bronze vessel has been found which is decorated with gold and silver. A gold foundry with about 3000 unpolished semi-precious stones has been found. Many tools used for polishing these stones and a furnace were found there. A burial site has been found with 11 skeletons, with their heads in the north direction. Near the heads of these skeletons, utensils for everyday use were kept. The three female skeletons have shell bangles on their left wrists. Near one female skeleton, a gold armlet has been found. In addition semi precious stones have been found lying near the head, suggesting that they were part of some sort of necklace.

==== Granary ====
A granary belonging to mature Harappan phase (2600 BCE to 2000 BCE) has been found here. Granary is made up of mud-bricks with a floor of ramped earth plastered with mud. It has 7 rectangular or square chambers. Significant traces of lime & decomposed grass are found on the lower portion of the granary wall indicating that it can also be the storehouse of grains with lime used as insecticide and grass used to prevent entry of moisture. Looking at the size, it appears to be a public granary or a private granary of elites.

==== Tools ====
Hunting tools like copper hafts and fish hooks have been found here. Presence of various toys like mini wheels, miniature lids, sling balls, animal figurines indicates a prevalence of toy culture. Signs of flourishing trade can be seen by the excavation of stamps, jewellery and 'chert' weights. Weights found here are similar to weights found at many other IVC sites confirming presence of standardised weight systems.

==== Culture, clothing and worship ====
Fire altars and apsidal structures were revealed in Rakhigarhi.

Cotton cloth traces preserved on silver or bronze objects were known from Rakhigarhi, Chanhudaro and Harappa. An impressive number of stamps seals were also found at this site.

==== Cemetery and burial sites ====
A cemetery of Mature Harappan period is discovered at Rakhigarhi, with eight graves found. Often brick covered grave pits had wooden coffin in one case. Different type of grave pits were undercut to form an earthen overhang and body was placed below this; and then top of grave was filled with bricks to form a roof structure over the grave.

So far 53 burial sites with 46 skeletons have been discovered. Anthropological examination done on 37 skeletons revealed 17 to be of adults, 8 to be of subadults while the age of 12 skeletons could not be verified. Sex detection of 17 skeletons was successful out of which 7 were male and 10 female skeletons. Most of the burials were typical burials with skeletons in a supine position. Atypical burials had skeletons in a prone position. Some graves are just pits while some are brick lined and contain pottery. Some of them also had votive pots with animal remains symbolising offerings to the dead. Bone remains of secondary burials were not charred hence ruling out the possibility of cremation practices. While these burials retained many of the Harappan features, group burials and prone position burials are distinct. Paleo-parasitical studies and DNA analysis to determine the lineage is being undertaken.

Parasite eggs which were once existed in the stomach of those buried were found in the burial sites along with human skeletons. Analysis of Human aDNA obtained from human bones as well as analysis of parasite and animal DNA will be done to assert origins of these people.

==== Skeleton finds ====
In April 2015, four 4,600-year-old complete human skeletons were excavated from mound RGR-7. These skeletons belonged to two male adults, one female adult (classified as 'I6113') and one child. Pottery with grains of food as well as shell bangles were found around these skeletons.

- Photo of the skeleton of "Rakhigarhi love birds" buried together with male (11A) facing the woman (11B), with their feet pointing south and head towards north.

Two of the skeletons, a man between 35 and 40 years old and women in early 20s, who died around the same time. They were found buried together side by side with men's head facing the women. Their ceremonial burial indicates that they were not in illicit relationship and the lovebirds were likely married to each other. Pots found in their grave likely carried food and water as offerings to the dead. The agate found near he collar bone of the male was likely part of a necklace. The male was 177 cm (5 ft 9 1/2 in) tall and female was 171 cm (5 ft 7 1/2 in). Their skeleton had no abnormalities, injuries or sign of disease. They were both likely "quite healthy" at the time of their death.

Shinde et al. (2019) have carried out DNA-tests on a single skeleton. Results announced in September 2018, and a paper published in Cell Magazine in 2019, show that the DNA did not include any traces of steppe ancestry, which is in line with the Aryan migration theory, which says that Indo-Aryans migrated to India from the steppes after the Harappan civilisation had started to disintegrate.

A total of 61 skeletons were found till 2016. As the skeletons were excavated scientifically without any contamination, archaeologists think that with the help of latest technology on these skeletons and DNA obtained, it is possible to determine how Harappans looked like 4500 years ago. The average height is estimated to have been 175.8 cm (5 ft 9 in) for men and 166.1 cm (5 ft 5 1/2 in) for women.

In 2024, the 'Mound 7' of the excavation site, which encompasses an area of 3.5 sqkms, yielded 56 skeletons.

=== Criticism ===
The conduct of digs by the Archaeological Survey of India (ASI), including at Rakhigarhi, has come under criticism for being like a "zamindari" system wherein "the individual excavation director" "had nearly dictatorial control over the material excavated", and questions are being raised about the scientific quality of the ASI's excavations of a number of Harappan sites. Scholarly interpretation of Rakhigarhi, as with a number of other archaeological sites of ancient India, has been subject to contestation regarding the methodologies and ideology of the ASI: many senior officials of the ASI have been "embroiled in controversies" over pseudo-"scientific" efforts to legitimise the Hindutva ideology which identifies the ancient Harappans (incorrectly) with the Vedas and Sanskrit, in order to synthesize the nationalist narrative of Indian civilisation as indigenous and continuous since its beginning, allegedly originating from the banks of the Saraswati River (rather than the Indus).

== Site conservation and development ==
=== Endangered heritage site ===
In May 2012, the Global Heritage Fund declared Rakhigarhi one of the ten most endangered heritage sites in Asia facing the threat of irreparable loss and destruction due to development pressures, insufficient management and looting. A 2012 study by the Sunday Times found that the site is not being looked after; the iron boundary wall is broken, and villagers sell the artefacts they dig out of the site and parts of site are now being encroached by private houses. Due to the lack of site protection the site is being destroyed by soil erosion, encroachments, illegal sand lifting, theft of archaeological artefacts for illegal sale. It is a punishable crime to sell or buy artefacts found in the ancient sites. 80% of mound 6 – a residential site of Harappan Era and 7 which is a burial site where 4 human skeletons were recovered in 2015 have been destroyed due to cultivation and soil mining.

=== Site encroachments ===
Parts of mounds R4 and R5 have been encroached by the villagers who have built 152 houses. The ASI has only 83.5 acres of the 350-hectare site that entails 11 archaeological mounds, due to encroachments and pending court cases for the removal of the encroachments.

=== Site rehabilitation and preservation ===
In February 2020, Union Finance Minister Nirmala Sitharaman announced that the site of Rakhigarhi would be developed as an iconic site. ASI has commenced the plan to remove encroachments from the site, including 152 houses on the R4 and R5 mounds. Villages, whose houses in the site will be removed, will be relocated and rehabilitated in the housing flats on another location.

=== Site museum and lake ===
Rakhigarhi, which is an Indus Valley Civilisation site, also has a museum developed by the state government. There is also Haryana Rural Antique Museum 60 km away, which is maintained by CCS HAU in its Gandhi Bhawan, exhibits evolution of agriculture and vanishing antiques. Jahaj Kothi Museum, named after George Thomas, is located inside Firoz Shah Palace Complex and maintained by Archaeological Survey of India.

To develop Rakhigarhi as the global heritage, two johad (water bodies) across the road to museum are developed as lakes. The lake has been deepened by digging and traditional ghats with burji on the banks of lake have been constructed. A park is developed the spare land of the lake. A walking track around the lake, with shady trees and fruit trees, has been constructed for the tourists. The traditional ghats represent the past scenario when paleo-Drishadvati river use to flow through Rakhigarhi which had ghats for transporting goods for trade, via Lothal port and Dholavira, as far as Mesopotamia (ancient cities of Elam and Sumer).

== See also ==
- Indus Valley Civilisation related
- List of inventions and discoveries of the Indus Valley Civilization
- Rakhigarhi Indus Valley Civilisation Museum

== Sources ==
Printed sources

- Allchin, F. R.; Erdosy, George (1995), The Archaeology of Early Historic South Asia: The Emergence of Cities and States, Cambridge University Press, ISBN 978-0-521-37695-2
- Avikunthak, Ashish (2022). Bureaucratic Archaeology: State, Science, and Past in Postcolonial India. South Asia in the Social Sciences. Cambridge University Press. ISBN 978-1-009-08200-6.
- Coningham, Robin; Young, Ruth (2015), The Archaeology of South Asia: From the Indus to Asoka, c.6500 BCE–200 CE, Cambridge University Press, ISBN 978-0-521-84697-4
- Garge, Tejas (2010). "Sothi-Siswal Ceramic Assemblage: A Reappraisal". Ancient Asia. 2: 15. doi:10.5334/aa.10203.
- Heitzman, James (2008), The City in South Asia, Routledge, ISBN 978-1-134-28962-2
- Kenoyer, Jonathan M. (1998), Ancient Cities of the Indus Valley Civilization, Oxford University Press, ISBN 978-0-19-577940-0
- Mani, B.R. (2008), "Kashmir Neolithic and Early Harappan: A Linkage" (PDF), Pragdhara, 18: 229–247, archived from the original (PDF) on 18 January 2017
- McIntosh, Jane R. (2008). The ancient Indus Valley: new perspectives. Santa Barbara, Calif.: ABC-CLIO. ISBN 978-1-57607-907-2.
- Nath, Amarendra; Garge, Tejas; Law, Randall (2014). "Defining the Economic Space of the Harappan Rakhigarhi: An Interface of the Local Subsistance Mechanism and Geological Provenience Studies". Puratattva 44. New Delhi: Indian Archaeological Society.
- Nath, Amarendera (2015). "Harrapan interments at Rakhigarhi". Man and Environment. XL (2). Indian Society for Prehistoric and Quaternary Studies: 11.
- Possehl, Gregory L. (2002), The Indus Civilization: A Contemporary Perspective, Rowman Altamira, ISBN 978-0-7591-0172-2
- Sarkar, Anindya; Mukherjee, Arati Deshpande; Bera, M. K.; Das, B.; Juyal, Navin; Morthekai, P.; Deshpande, R. D.; Shinde, V. S.; Rao, L. S. (2016). "Oxygen isotope in archaeological bioapatites from India: Implications to climate change and decline of Bronze Age Harappan civilization". Scientific Reports. 6 26555. Bibcode:2016NatSR...626555S. doi:10.1038/srep26555. PMC 4879637. PMID 27222033.
- Shinde, Vasant; Green, Adam; Parmar, Narender; Sable, P. D. (2012). "Rakhigarhi and the Harappan Civilization: Recent Work and New Challenges". Bulletin of the Deccan College Research Institute. 72/73: 43–53. JSTOR 43610687.
- Shinde, Vasant; Narasimhan, Vagheesh M.; Rohland, Nadin; Mallick, Swapan; Mah, Matthew; Lipson, Mark; Nakatsuka, Nathan; Adamski, Nicole; Broomandkhoshbacht, Nasreen; Ferry, Matthew; Lawson, Ann Marie (17 October 2019). "An Ancient Harappan Genome Lacks Ancestry from Steppe Pastoralists or Iranian Farmers". Cell. 179 (3): 729–735.e10. doi:10.1016/j.cell.2019.08.048. ISSN 0092-8674. PMC 6800651. PMID 31495572.
- Shinde, Vasant; Shin, Dong Hoon; Bhattacharyya, Banani (2023). New Perspectives on the Harappan Culture in Light of Recent Excavations at Rakhigarhi: 2011–2017, Volume 1: Bioarchaeological Research on the Rakhigarhi Necropolis: Symposium Proceedings of the 6th International Congress of The Society of South Asian Archaeology and Updated Scientific Research. Archaeopress Publishing Limited. ISBN 978-1-80327-592-5.
- Varma, Supriya; Menon, Jaya (2010). "Was There a Temple under the Babri Masjid? Reading the Archaeological 'Evidence'". Economic and Political Weekly. 45 (50): 61–72. ISSN 0012-9976. JSTOR 25764216.
- Wright, Rita P. (2009), The Ancient Indus: Urbanism, Economy, and Society, Cambridge University Press, ISBN 978-0-521-57219-4

Web-sources
