= Kunal, Haryana =

Kunal
- Archaeological Site
- Location within Haryana Location within India
- Coordinates: 29°37.3′N 75°39.5′E
- Country: India
- State: Haryana
- District: Fatehabad

Languages
  - Official: Hindi, Haryanvi
- Time zone: UTC+5.30 (Indian Standard Time)

Kunal is a pre-Harappan Indus Valley Civilisation settlement located, just 30 km from Fatehabad City in Fatehabad district of Haryana state in India. Compared to other IVC sites, such as cities like Rakhigarhi and towns like Kalibangan, Kunal site was a village. Excavation at Kunal show 3 successive phases of Pre-Harappan indigenous culture on the Saraswati river who also traded with Kalibangan and Lothal. Kunal, along with its other contemporary sites Bhirrana and Rakhigarhi on Sarasvati-Ghaggar river system, is recognised as the oldest Pre-Harappan settlement, with Kunal being an older cultural ancestor to Rehman Dheri in Pakistan, which is on the Tentative List for future World Heritage Sites.

Kunal is 12 km southeast of Ratia, 30 km northwest of Bhuna, 30 km northeast of Fatehabad, 70 km north of Hisar, 190 km southwest of Chandigarh, 230 km northwest from Delhi,

== Background ==
=== Site location ===
Site is located closer to other important IVC sites, such as 18 km northeast of Bhirrana, 45 km northeast of Banawali, 80 km northwest of Rakhigarhi, 85 km west of Balu, Haryana, and 150 km northeast of Jognakhera. It is 30 km northeast of Fatehabad city. It is 12 km southeast of Ratia and 12 km northwest of Bhuna on Bhuna-Ratia rural road.

From Digoh-Kunal Road, on the spot where a yellow metal board with red-colored Hindi letters announces "Harrappa kalin sthal" (Harappan era site) with a painted red arrow below it pointing in the direction of the site, a 700 m-long (2,300 ft) unpaved rural farm track to the west of Digoh-Kunal Road leads to this site. The site is immediate north (on right-hand side) of the track. This track, perpendicular to both, connects Digoh-Kunal Road and Dholu-Mohammadpur Sotter Road.

=== History of excavations ===
After 1986 discovery of Kunal as IVC site, it has been in 1992-93, 1996–97, 1998–99, 1999-2000, 2001-2002, 2002-2003, 2017-2021, 2023-24. The 2023-24 excavation will go 20 m deep to explore all three layers, and first layer was found at 3 m deep.

Excavations has been undertaken by various entities including, the Archaeological Survey of India (ASI), Indian Archaeological Society (IAS), National Museum of India (NMI, and the Haryana Archaeological Department (HAD). Excavations here are usually done in non-rainy season.

== Kunal culture ==
Kunal culture: Based on the pottery found here, it is classified as a separate archaeological culture / subculture.

=== Cultural context ===
The earliest site of this culture is Kunal (4000 BCE) in Haryana, which is older than Rehman Dheri (3300 BCE). The type site, the first excavated site of this type of culture is Kot Diji. Rehman Dheri, which was considered oldest example of this culture, is now the second oldest example of this culture after Kunal was excavated and found to be older than Rehman Dheri with similar older cultural artifacts then the Rehman Dheri.

Kot Diji and Amri are close to each other in Sindh; they earlier developed indigenous culture which had common elements; later they came in contact with Harappan culture and fully developed into Harappan culture. Earliest examples of artifacts belonging to this culture were found at Rehman Dheri, however, later excavations found the oldest example of this culture at Kunal. These are cultural ancestor to site at Harappa. These sites have pre-Harappan indigenous cultural levels, distinct from the culture of Harappa, these are at Banawali (level I), Kot Diji (level 3A), Amri (level II). Rehman Dheri also has a pre Kot Diji phase (RHD1 3300-28 BCE) which are not part of IVC culture. Kot Diji has two later phases that continue into and alongside Mature Harappan Phase (RHDII and RHDII 2500-2100 BCE). Fortified towns found here are dated as follows.

- Kunal (5000/4000 BCE- ), in Hisar district of Haryana in India is the earliest site found with layers in phase I dating back to 5000 BCE and 4000 BCE, site's culture is an older ancestry of the Pre-Harappan site of Rehman Dheri which was dated to 3300 BC. A button seal was discovered at Kunal during 1998-99 excavations by Archaeological Survey of India. The seal is similar to the Rehman Dheri examples. It contained a picture of two deer on one side, and geometrical pattern on other side. The similar specimen from Rehman-Dheri is datable to c. 4000 BCE, which makes Kunal site an older ancestor of Rehman Dheri. The second phase of Kunal corresponds to post-Neolithic phase of Hakra culture (also called Early Harappan Phase, c.3300-2800 BCE or c.5000-2800 BCE) was also found.
- Kot Diji (3300 BCE), is the type site, located in Sindh in Pakistan.
- Amri (3600–3300 BCE), also has non-Harappan phases during 6000 BC to 4000 BC, and later Harappan Phases till 1300 BCE.
- Kalibangan (3500 BC – 2500 BC), in northwest Rajasthan in India on Ghaggar River.
- Rehman Dheri, 3300 BCE, near Dera Ismail Khan and close to River Zhob Valley in Khyber Pakhtunkhwa in Pakistan.

=== Significance ===
Kunal, along with its contemporary Kunal and Bhirrana as well as Rakhigarhi, is recognised as the oldest pre-Harappan settlement. The carbon dating of Bhirrana site revealed that it dated back to 7030 BC (9,000 years old). The excavation in Kunal has shown that it is contemporary to the Pre-Harappa phase of Bhirrana site – the oldest Indus civilisation site – 18 km from Kunal. The artifacts found at Kunal have provided significant information about the "lifestyle, socio-economic milieu and food habit of the people who lived along the Sarasvati River in the ancient times. Kunal, Bhirrana and Rakhigarhi were contemporary habitation sites". The hoard containing gold beads and copper rings at Kunal are evidence of developed village farming communities with trade links to far-flung countries for the import of metal and precious stones which are not found in this area. Discovery of a button seal during 1998–1999 excavations by ASI shows this site's culture is an older ancestry of the Rehman Dheri.

=== Kunal culture is older ancestor of Pre-Harappan Rehman Dheri ===
Discovery of a button seal during 1998-99 excavations by ASI shows this site's culture is an older ancestry of the Pre-Harappan site of Rehman Dheri which was dated to 3300 BC. This seal found at Kunal, datable to c. 4000 BCE, contained a picture of two deer on one side and a geometrical pattern on other side, which is similar to a specimen from Rehman-Dheri in Khyber Pakhtunkhwa.

=== Earliest Pre-Harappan site ===
This site is recognised as an earliest Pre-Harappan site, with three successive phases of Pre-Harappan indigenous culture on the Saraswati river who also traded with Kalibanga and Lothal. The discovery of regalis (royal items) excavated from this mound are the oldest of its kind in the Indian subcontinent, Central Asia and Iran. Discoveries include woman's complete dress, tribal head attire, copper spearheads, steatite seals with geometrical patterns (indicating seal making in IVC first begun here), terracotta antiques, arrowheads, fish hooks, two crowns, bangles, silver beads, gold pendants and over 12,000 beads of semi precious stones including lapis lazuli.

- First phase -3 meter deep: Dates back to 5,000 years ago is the oldest habitation, which has large dwelling pits of 1.10 m depth and 2 m diameter, whose omnivorous inhabitants also used Chalcedony blades, fish hooks, pottery wheels, domesticated plants and animals. This site yielded Hakra ware at entry level. Houses were built on an artificially elevated place. 2023-24 excavation found large smelters and kiln where poetry and beads were made, which indicates the Trade network with other places. Away from the dwellings the large deep pits were found which were used for disposing of rubbish, an evidence that people were cleanliness conscious.
- Second phase: The dwellings are made of moulded bricks. A dwelling pit of two metre diameter belonging to post-neolithic phase of Hakra culture (also called Early Harappan Phase, c.3300-2800 BCE or c.5000-2800 BCE) was also found.
- Third phase - 20 meter deep: The final phase of excavation belongs to agriculturists who also reared domesticated animals and lived in houses containing living rooms, kitchens, toilets square and rectangular rooms built with bricks of standardised length-breadth-height ratio.

== Artifacts ==
Designs on pottery included pipal leaves (ficus religiosa) and humped bull which were important motifs found on Mature Harappan seals. Bone tools, micro blades made of chalcedony, copper fish hooks and arrow heads were also found here. Six steatite seals and one shell seal with geometric patterns were found. These six seals were of square shape, made of grey stone and resembled typical Mature Harappan seals. Also found at this site are copper rods, rings, bangle pieces, terracotta objects like bangles, balls, animal figurines, net-sinker, toy cart frames, disk and toys, stone balls, shell bangles etc.

=== Hoards ===
Large hoards of jewellery were found at this location, including two silver tiaras, gold ornaments, beads of semi precious stones etc. Number of hoards found at this site included silver bangle, copper tools etc.

=== Copper smelting ===
Excavations on south-west side of mound revealed copper furnaces with smelting material and copper ingots and slags were also found at this site.

=== Rice ===
Rice (probably wild) is found from Kunal as well as from Balu, both in Haryana.

== Conservation and threats ==
=== In-situ museum ===
Kunal Indus Valley Civilisation Museum, is an under construction in-situ museum announced by the Haryana government in December 2020. The HAD will finalise the design and state's Public Works Department will undertake the construction.

=== Protected status and threats ===
Kunal site has been granted the protected status by the Government of Haryana which has also constructed a boundary wall around it for protection. This unguarded important site remains under the threat of encroachment and theft.re Experts have demanded specific project for surveying the largest area with ground penetrating radars to determine the exact extent of the site and subsequent land acquisition by the government for its preservation.

Conservationists and villagers have demanded that the 1.2 km-long (0.75 mi) unpaved track, connecting two paved roads, to the site must also be paved after changing its alignment (if needed) based on the ground-penetrating radar surveys.

== See also ==
- Indus Valley Civilization
  - List of Indus Valley Civilization sites
    - Bhirrana, 4 phases of IVC with earliest dated to 8th-7th millennium BCE
    - Kalibanga, an IVC town and fort with several phases starting from Early harappan phase
    - Rakhigarhi, one of the largest IVC city with 4 phases of IVC with earliest dated to 8th-7th millennium BCE
    - Kunal, pre harappan cultural ancestor of Rehman Dheri
  - List of inventions and discoveries of the Indus Valley Civilization
    - Hydraulic engineering of the Indus Valley Civilization
    - Sanitation of the Indus Valley Civilisation
  - Periodisation of the Indus Valley Civilisation
  - Pottery in the Indian subcontinent
    - Bara culture, subtype of Late-Harappan Phase
    - Black and red ware, belonging to Neolithic and Pre-Harappan phases
    - Kunal culture, subtype of Pre-Harappan Phase
    - Sothi-Siswal culture, subtype of Pre-Harappan Phase
    - Cemetery H culture (2000-1400 BC), early Indo-Aryan pottery at IVC sites later evolved into Painted Grey Ware culture of Vedic period
  - Rakhigarhi Indus Valley Civilisation Museum
- History of Haryana
  - List of Monuments of National Importance in Haryana
  - List of State Protected Monuments in Haryana
