= Periodisation of the Indus Valley Civilisation =

Prehistoric eras of the Indus Valley Civilisation

Several periodisations are employed for the periodisation of the Indus Valley Civilisation. While the Indus Valley Civilisation was divided into Early, Mature, and Late Harappan by archaeologists like Mortimer Wheeler, newer periodisations include the Neolithic early farming settlements, and use a stage–phase model, often combining terminology from various systems.

== Periodisations ==
The most commonly used nomenclature classifies the Indus Valley civilisation into early, mature, and late Harappan phases. The Indus Valley Civilisation was preceded by local agricultural villages, from where the river plains were populated when water management became available, creating an integrated civilisation. This broader time range has also been called the Indus Age and the Indus Tradition.

=== Early, Mature, and Late Harappan ===
Early surveys by Sir Aurel Stein in Balochistan led to the discovery of numerous prehistoric sites of unknown association. Following excavations at Harappa and Mohenjo Daro, the prehistoric sites in Sindh and Baluchistan were thought to represent a culture that migrated from Baluchistan to the Indus Valley to establish the Indus Valley Civilisation. This notion was refuted by M.R. Mughal based on his discovery of earlier occupational phases in the Cholistan Desert. The term Early Harappan was coined by M. R. Mughal in his dissertation at the University of Pennsylvania which provided a synthesis of his many surveys and studies throughout Pakistan. This classification is primarily based on Harappa and Mohenjo Daro, assuming an evolutionary sequence. According to Manuel, this division "places the Indus Valley within a tripartite evolutionary framework, of the birth, florescence, and death of a society in a fashion familiar to the social evolutionary concepts of Elman Service (1971)."

According to Coningham and Young, it was "cemented [...] in common use" due to "the highly influential British archaeologists Raymond and Bridget Allchin [who] used similar subdivisions in their work." According to Coningham and Young, this approach is "limited" and "restricted," putting too much emphasis on the mature phase.

=== Shaffer: Harappan Tradition ===
Scholarship in archaeology commonly uses a variation of the Three-age system developed by Christian Jürgensen Thomsen to divide past societies into a Stone Age, a Bronze Age, and an Iron Age. Although this system is very useful for its original purpose of organizing museum collections, it is unable to fully characterize the dynamic and fluid nature of human inter-settlement relationships. To address this issue, archaeologists Gordon Willey and Philip Phillips developed a system based on Culture-Historical Integration, or a heuristic concept for describing the distribution of "relatedness" across time and space. These concepts were later adapted by Jim G. Shaffer and Diane Liechtenstein as a potential solution to a similar problem in the Greater Indus Valley.

During his archaeological research in Afghanistan, Baluchistan, Pakistan, and India, Shaffer observed the fluid and adaptive nature of local customs in rural South Asia and the many ways that cultural practices interfaced with material culture. Based on both his extensive work in the field and these ethnographic observations, Shaffer developed a series of important critiques of archaeological theory. Shaffer and Liechtenstein argued that the colonial legacy of Mortimer Wheeler and Stuart Piggot led to the projection of colonial stereotypes onto the ancient past. As a result of these critiques, Shaffer adapted the system developed by Willey and Phillips into one suitable for the Indus Valley Civilisation. In his original publication, this complex social formation was termed the Harappan Tradition, after the type site at Harappa, Punjab. This term Tradition stems from his concept of Cultural Tradition or the "persistent configuration of basic technologies, as well as structure, in the context of geographical and temporal continuity".

Shaffer divided the broader Indus Valley Tradition into four eras, the pre-Harappan "Early Food Producing Era," and the Regionalisation, Integration, and Localisation eras, which correspond roughly with the Early Harappan, Mature Harappan, and Late Harappan phases. Each era can be divided into various phases. A phase is an archaeological unit possessing traits sufficiently characteristic to distinguish it from all other units similarly conceived. According to Shaffer, there was considerable regional variation, as well as differences in cultural sequences, and these eras and phases are not evolutionary sequences, and cannot uniformly be applied to every site.

According to Coningham and Young,

A critical feature of Shaffer's developmental framework was replacing the traditional Mesolithic/Neolithic, 'Chalcolithic'/Early Harappan, Mature Harappan, and Late Harappan terminology with Eras which were intended to reflect the longer-term changes or processes which provided the platform for eventual complexity and urbanisation [...] Notably, Shaffer's categorisation also allowed scholars to frame sites such as Mehrgarh, accepted by all as partly ancestral to the Indus cities, within a distinctly pervasive Indus tradition rather than lying outside a Pre-Urban or incipient urban phase.

Coningham & Young raise theoretical concerns with Shaffer's periodisation, noting that

...it remains questionable whether there is sufficient difference and distinction between Shaffer's definitions of Regionalisation and Localisation. Shaffer's own definition (quoted earlier) observes the similarities of the two eras, with some differentiation in the form of contact between groups.

==== Eras ====
The Early Food Producing Era corresponds to ca. 7000-5500 BCE. It is also called the Neolithic period. The economy of this era was based on food production, and agriculture developed in the Indus Valley. Mehrgarh Period I belongs to this era. The Regionalisation Era corresponds to ca. 4000-2500/2300 BCE (Shaffer) or ca. 5000-2600 BCE (Coningham & Young). The Early Harappan phase belongs to this Era. According to Manuel, "the most significant development of this period was the shift in population from the uplands of Baluchistan to the floodplains of the Indus Valley." This era was very productive in arts, and new crafts were invented. The Regionalisation Era includes the Balakot, Amri, Hakra, and Kot Diji Phases.

The Integration Era refers to the period of the "Indus Valley civilisation". It is a period of integration of various smaller cultures. The Localisation Era (1900-1300 BCE) is the fourth and final period of the Indus Valley Tradition. It refers to the fragmentation of the culture of the Integration Era. The Localisation Era comprises several phases:

- Punjab Phase (Cemetery H, Late Harappan). The Punjab Phase includes the Cemetery H and other cultures. Punjab Phase sites are found in Harappa and in other places.
- Jhukar Phase (Jhukar and Pirak) The Jhukar Phase refers to Mohenjo-daro and sites in Sindh.
- Rangpur Phase (Late Harappan and Lustrous Red Ware). The Rangpur Phase sites are in Kachchh, Saurashtra, and mainland Gujarat.
- The Pirak Phase is a phase of the Localisation Era of both the Indus Valley Tradition and the Baluchistan Tradition.

=== Possehl: Indus Age ===
Gregory Possehl includes the Neolithic stage in his periodisation, using the term Indus Age for this broader timespan, Possehl arranged archaeological phases into a seven-stage sequence:

1. Beginnings of Village Farming Communities and Pastoral camps
2. Developed Village Farming Communities and Pastoral camps
3. Early Harappan
4. Transition from Early Harappan to Mature Harappan
5. Mature Harappan
6. Posturban Harappan
7. Early Iron Age of Northern India and Pakistan

According to Coningham & Young,

Possehl's mixture of older periodisation (Mature Harappan), artefact-based descriptive classifications (Early Iron Age), and socio-economic processes (Developed Village Farming Communities) is not unique and others, such as Singh (2008), have presented similar categories which treat the Indus Valley and the Early Historic Traditions in very different ways and thus reinforce established divisions which prevent easy comparative discussion.

=== Rita Wright ===
A "similar framework" as Shaffer's has been used by Rita Wright, looking at the Indus "through a prism influenced by the archaeology of Mesopotamia," using the terms Early Food Producing Phase, Pre-Urban Phase, Urban Phase, and Post-Urban Phase.

== Datings and alternative proposals ==
=== Early Food Producing Era ===
Rao, who excavated Bhirrana, claims to have found pre-Harappan Hakra Ware in its oldest layers, dated at the 8th-7th millennium BCE. (Note: According to Dikshit and Rami, the estimation for the antiquity of Bhirrana as pre-Harappan is based on two calculations of charcoal samples, giving two dates of respectively 7570-7180 BCE, and 6689-6201 BCE. Hakra Ware culture is a material culture which is contemporaneous with the early Harappan Ravi phase culture (3300-2800 BCE) of the Indus Valley.) He proposes older datings for Bhirrana compared to the conventional Harappan datings, (Note: Sarkar et al. (2016): "Conventionally the Harappan cultural levels have been classified into 1) an Early Ravi Phase (~5.7–4.8 ka BP), 2) Transitional Kot Diji phase (~4.8–4.6 ka BP), 3) Mature phase (~4.6–3.9 ka BP) and 4) Late declining (painted Grey Ware) phase (3.9–3.3 ka BP13,19,20).") yet sticks to the Harappan terminology. This proposal is supported by Sarkar et al. (2016), co-authored by Rao, who also refer to a proposal by Possehl, and various radiocarbon dates from other sites, though giving 800 BCE as the enddate for the Mature Harappan phase: (Note: According to Sarkar et al. (2016), the various cultural levels at Bhirrana, as deciphered from the archaeological artifacts, are pre-Harappan (~9.5–8 ka BP), Early Harappan (~8–6.5 ka BP), Early mature Harappan (~6.5–5 ka BP) and mature Harappan (~5–2.8 ka BP). Compare Madina and Pirak, late Harappan elements until 800 BCE, together with Painted Grey Ware.) Rao 2005, and as summarized by Dikshit 2013, compares as follows with the conventional datings, and Shaffer (Eras).

Date	Culture (Rao 2005)	Period (Dikshit 2013)	Phase (Sarkar 2016)	Conventional date (HP)	Harappan Phase	Conventional date (Era)	Era
7500-6000 BCE	Period IA: Hakra Wares Culture	Pre-Harappan Hakra Period (Neolithic)	Pre-Harappan	7000-3300 BCE	Pre-Harappan	c.7000-c.4500 BCE	Early Food Producing Era
6000-4500 BCE	Period IB: Early Harappan	Transitional Period	Early Harappan	7000-3300 BCE	Pre-Harappan	c.7000-c.4500 BCE	Early Food Producing Era
4500-3000 BCE	Period IIA: Early Mature Harappan	Early Harappan Period	Early Mature Harappan	7000-3300 BCE	Pre-Harappan	c.4500-2600 BCE	Regionalisation Era
4500-3000 BCE	Period IIA: Early Mature Harappan	Early Harappan Period	Early Mature Harappan	3300-2600 BCE	Early Harappan	c.4500-2600 BCE	Regionalisation Era
3000-1800 BCE	Period IIB: Mature Harappan	Mature Harappan Period	Mature Harappan	3300-2600 BCE	Early Harappan	c.4500-2600 BCE	Regionalisation Era
3000-1800 BCE	Period IIB: Mature Harappan	Mature Harappan Period	Mature Harappan	2600-1900 BCE	Mature Harappan	2600-1900 BCE	Integration Era
1800-1600 BCE (1800-800 BCE)	Late Harappan Period	Late Harappan Period	Mature Harappan	1900-1300 BCE	Late Harappan	1900-1300	Localisation Era

=== Regionalisation Era ===
While the Early Harappan Phase was proposed to start at ca. 3300 BCE, the Regionalisation Era has been proposed to start earlier, at 4000 BCE to ca. 5000 BCE.

S. P. Gupta, taking into account new discoveries, periodised the Harappan Civilisation in a chronological framework that includes the Early, Mature, and Late Harappan Phase, and starts with the same date as the Regionalisation Era:

Date	Main phase	Subphase	Harappan Phase	Era
ca. 4000 - 3500 BCE	Formative Phase	e.g., Mehrgarh-IV-V	Pre-Harappan	Regionalisation Era
ca. 3500 - 2800 BCE	Early Phase	e.g., Kalibangan-I	Early Harappan	Regionalisation Era
ca. 2800 - 2600 BCE	Period of Transition	e.g., Dholavira-III	Early Harappan	Regionalisation Era
ca. 2600 - 1900 BCE	Mature Phase	e.g., Harappa-III, Kalibangan-II	Mature Harappan	Integration Era
ca. 1900 - 1500 BCE	Late Phase	e.g., Cemetery H, Jhukar	Late Harappan	Localisation Era
ca. 1500 - 1400 BCE	Final Phase	e.g., Dholavira	Late Harappan	Localisation Era

=== Integration Era ===
The consensus on the dating of the Integration Era, or Urban, or Mature Harappan Phase, is broadly accepted to be 2600-1900 BC.

== Durée longue: Harappan Civilisation and Early Historic Period ==
Jonathan M. Kenoyer, and Coningham & Young, provide an overview of developmental phases of India in which the Indus Valley Civilisation and the Early Historic Period are combined. The post-Harappan phase shows renewed regionalisation, culminating in the integration of the Second Urbanisation of the Early Historic Period, starting ca. 600 BC, c.q. the Maurya Empire, ca. 300 BC.

Coningham & Young note that most works on urbanisation in early Indian history focus on either the Indus Valley Civilisation or the Early Historic Period, "thus continuing the long-standing division between the Indus and Early Historic." According to Coningham & Young, this division was introduced in colonial times, with scholars who claimed that "a distinct cultural, linguistic, and social transformation lay between the Indus Civilisation and the Early Historic," and perpetuated by "a number of post-Independence South Asian scholars." Coningham & Young adopt Shaffer's terminology "to better understand and explore the processes which led to the two main urban-focused developments in South Asia," and

...replace the traditional terminologies of 'Chalcolithic', Iron Age, Proto-Historic, Early Historic, and Mauryan with those of a 'Localisation Era' followed by an Era of 'Regionalisation' and an Era of 'Integration'. We argue that Kenoyer's (1998) suggestion that the Era of Integration was only reached with the Mauryan period (c. 317 BC) was overcautious and that such a cultural and economic stage became evident in the archaeological record as early as 600 BC [...] This task is likely to be controversial and we acknowledge that not all scholars will be receptive.

They also note that the term "Integration Era" may not be applicable to the whole of South Asia for the period of the Mature Harappan Civilisation, because "large swathes of northern and southern South Asia were unaffected by what was, on a subcontinental scale, a regional feature."

== Concordance of periodisations ==
Dates	Main phase	Mehrgarh phases	Harappan phases	Other phases	Era
7000–5500 BCE	Pre-Harappan	Mehrgarh I (aceramic Neolithic)			Early Food Producing Era
5500–3300 BCE	Pre-Harappan/Early Harappan	Mehrgarh II-VI (ceramic Neolithic)			Regionalisation Era c.4000-2500/2300 BCE (Shaffer) c.5000-3200 BCE (Coningham & Young)
3300–2800 BCE	Early Harappan c.3300-2800 BCE c.5000-2800 BCE (Kenoyer)		Harappan 1 (Ravi Phase; Hakra Ware)		Regionalisation Era c.4000-2500/2300 BCE (Shaffer) c.5000-3200 BCE (Coningham & Young)
2800–2600 BCE	Early Harappan c.3300-2800 BCE c.5000-2800 BCE (Kenoyer)	Mehrgarh VII	Harappan 2 (Kot Diji Phase, Nausharo I)		Regionalisation Era c.4000-2500/2300 BCE (Shaffer) c.5000-3200 BCE (Coningham & Young)
2600–2450 BCE	Mature Harappan (Indus Valley Civilisation)		Harappan 3A (Nausharo II)		Integration Era
2450–2200 BCE	Mature Harappan (Indus Valley Civilisation)		Harappan 3B		Integration Era
2200–1900 BCE	Mature Harappan (Indus Valley Civilisation)		Harappan 3C		Integration Era
1900–1700 BCE	Late Harappan		Harappan 4	Cemetery H Ochre Coloured Pottery	Localisation Era
1700–1300 BCE	Late Harappan		Harappan 5	Cemetery H Ochre Coloured Pottery	Localisation Era
1300–600 BCE	Post-Harappan Iron Age India			Painted Grey Ware (1200-600 BCE); Vedic period (c.1500-500 BCE)	Regionalisation c.1200-300 BCE (Kenoyer) c.1500-600 BCE (Coningham & Young)
600-300 BCE	Post-Harappan Iron Age India			Northern Black Polished Ware (Iron Age)(700-200 BCE); Second urbanisation (c.500-200 BCE)	Integration

== See also ==
- Bhirrana
- Iron Age in India
- History of India

== Sources ==
- Ahmed, Mihktar (2014), Ancient Pakistan - an Archaeological History
- Coningham, Robin; Young, Ruth (2015), Archaeology of South Asia: From the Indus to Asoka, c.6500 BCE–200 CE, Cambridge University Press
- Dikshit, K.N. (2013), "Origin of Early Harappan Cultures in the Sarasvati Valley: Recent Archaeological Evidence and Radiometric Dates" (PDF), Journal of Indian Ocean Archaeology (9), archived from the original (PDF) on 18 January 2017
- Erdosy, George, ed. (1995), The Indo-Aryans of Ancient South Asia
- Gupta, S.P. (1999), "The dawn of civilisation", in Pande, G.C.; Chattophadhyaya, D.P. (eds.), History of Science, Philosophy and Culture in Indian Civilization, vol I Part 1, New Delhi: Centre for Studies in Civilizations
- Kenoyer, Jonathan Mark (1991), "The Indus Valley tradition of Pakistan and Western India", Journal of World Prehistory, 5 (4): 1–64, Bibcode:1991JWPre...5..331K, doi:10.1007/BF00978474, S2CID 41175522
- Kenoyer, Jonathan Mark (1997), "Early city-states in South Asia: comparing the Harappan phase and Early Historic period", in Charlton, Thomas Henry; Nichols, Deborah L. (eds.), The Archaeology of City-states: Cross-cultural Approaches, Smithsonian Inst. Press
- Law (II), William Randal (2008). Inter-regional Interaction and Urbanism in the Ancient Indus Valley: A Geologic Provenience Study of Harappa's Rock and Mineral Assemblage. Ann Arbor, MI. p. 83. ISBN 978-0-549-62879-8.
- Mani, B.R. (2008), "Kashmir Neolithic and Early Harappan: A Linkage" (PDF), Pragdhara 18, 229–247 (2008), archived from the original (PDF) on 18 January 2017
- Manuel, Mark (2010), "Chronology and Culture-History in the Indus Valley", in Gunawardhana, P.; Adikari, G.; Coningham Battaramulla, R.A.E. (eds.), Sirinimal Lakdusinghe Felicitation Volume, Neptune
- Possehl, Gregory L. (2002), The Indus Civilization: A Contemporary Perspective, Rowman Altamira, ISBN 978-0-7591-1642-9
- Rao, L.S.; Sahu, N.B.; Sahu, Prabash; Shastry, U.A.; Diwan, Samir (2005), "New light on the excavation of Harappan settlement at Bhirrana" (PDF), Purātattva (35)
- Sarkar, Anindya (2016), "Oxygen isotope in archaeological bioapatites from India: Implications to climate change and decline of Bronze Age Harappan civilization", Scientific Reports, 6 26555, Bibcode:2016NatSR...626555S, doi:10.1038/srep26555, PMC 4879637, PMID 27222033
- Shaffer, J. G. (1992), "The Indus Valley, Baluchistan and Helmand Traditions: Neolithic Through Bronze Age", in Ehrich, R. (ed.), Chronologies in Old World Archaeology (3rd Edition), Chicago: University of Chicago Press
- Willey; Phillips (1958), Method and Theory in American Archaeology
- Wright, Rita P. (2009), The Ancient Indus: Urbanism, Economy, and Society, Cambridge University Press, ISBN 978-0-521-57219-4
