= Casting the Buddha =

2024 history book by Shashank Shekhar Sinha

- Author: Shashank Shekhar Sinha
- Language: English
- Subject: History of Buddhism in India
- Genre: History
- Publisher: Pan Macmillan India
- Publication date: 17 December 2024
- Publication place: India
- Media type: Print, ebook
- Pages: 400

Casting the Buddha: A Monumental History of Buddhism is a 2024 non-fiction book by the Indian historian Shashank Shekhar Sinha about the history of Buddhism in India, told through its surviving stupas, temples and monastic ruins. Several of the sites it covers are now UNESCO World Heritage Sites. Pan Macmillan India published the book on 17 December 2024, and it won the 2025 Karwaan Book Award for non-fiction.

== Summary ==
The book is 400 pages long, with 101 photographs by the author and nearly 500 references. It opens with the Buddha's emergence as a figure of devotion and the earliest stupas and monasteries built in his memory. Four UNESCO sites get extended treatment: the Mahabodhi Temple at Bodh Gaya, the stupas at Sanchi, the Ajanta Caves, and the ruins of Nalanda. A final section covers Buddhism's revival in India through the Tibetan diaspora and the Neo-Buddhist movement, and argues that these sites have become tools of Indian diplomacy with its Buddhist-majority neighbours.

== Background ==
Shashank Shekhar Sinha is an independent historian and Publishing Director at Routledge South Asia, an imprint of Taylor & Francis. He taught history at the University of Delhi for nearly a decade before working at Oxford University Press and later Routledge. He is also the author of Restless Mothers and Turbulent Daughters: Situating Tribes in Gender Studies and writes on monuments and heritage for Frontline magazine.

== Reception ==
The book carries pre-publication endorsements from the historians Upinder Singh and Himanshu Prabha Ray, the archaeologist Julia Shaw, and the art historian Susan L. Huntington. A review on the blog Aishwariya's LittLog praised the book's multidisciplinary approach and its detailed treatment of the four UNESCO sites, while noting that its first section repeats some historical information covered elsewhere in the book. Casting the Buddha won the non-fiction award at the 2025 Karwaan Book Awards.
