= J. F. Blakiston =

British archaeologist in India (1882–1965)

John Francis Blakiston CIE
- Born: 21 March 1882; United Kingdom
- Died: 8 January 1965 (aged 82)
- Scientific career
- Fields: History, archaeology
- Workplaces: Archaeological Survey of India

John Francis Blakiston CIE (21 March 1882 – 8 January 1965) was a British Indian archaeologist who served as Director General of the Archaeological Survey of India (ASI) from 1935 to 1937.

== Early life and education ==
Blakiston was born on 21 March 1882 in the United Kingdom and educated at the Wellington College as an architect. In March 1911, Blakiston joined the Archaeological Survey of India. Blakiston was in active military service from 1915 to 1919 including a stint in France in 1917 and 1918.

== Career ==
Blakiston served as Assistant Superintendent of Eastern Circle and later, Superintendent of the Northern Circle during the 1920s. He also served as Deputy Director-General of the Archaeological Survey of India, the second highest post in the survey during the tenures of John Marshall and Harold Hargreaves before being superseded by Daya Ram Sahni in 1931. On Sahni's retirement on 1 June 1935, Blakiston succeeded him as Director General.

Preceded by Daya Ram Sahni	Director General of the Archaeological Survey of India; 1935–1937	Succeeded by K. N. Dikshit
