= Harold Hargreaves =

British Indian archaeologist

Harold Hargreaves (born 29 May 1876) was a British Indian archaeologist who served as Director General of the Archaeological Survey of India (ASI) from 1928 to 1931.

== Early life ==
Born on 29 May 1876, Hargreaves specialized in Buddhist iconography and served as headmaster of the Government High School in Amritsar before joining the Archaeological Survey of India.

== Career in the ASI ==
Between 1910 and 1912, Hargreaves officiated as Superintendent of the Frontier Circle when the then Superintendent, Buddhist scholar Aurel Stein had been to England on deputation. When the serving Superintendent of the Northern Circle, J. Ph. Vogel resigned from the survey, Hargreaves was transferred to the Northern Circle to fill in his post. During his tenure in the Northern Circle, Hargreaves visited the mounds at Harappa, Rajanpur and Sarnath and participated in the excavations at Harappa under John Marshall.

Hargreaves returned to the Frontier Circle a few years later and carried out excavations at Sohr Damb area near Nal, Balochistan, now a province of Pakistan in May 1924. He was made Deputy Director General of the ASI and in 1928, succeeded John Marshall as Director General.

Preceded by John Marshall	Director General of the Archaeological Survey of India; 1928–1931	Succeeded by Daya Ram Sahni
