= Daya Ram Sahni =

Indian archaeologist (1879–1939)

Rai Bahadur Daya Ram Sahni CIE
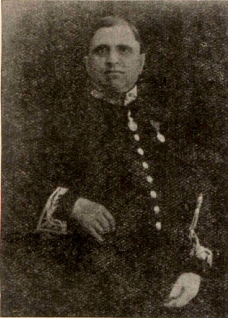
- Born: 16 December 1879; Bhera, Punjab Province, British India (now in Punjab Province, Pakistan)
- Died: 7 March 1939 (aged 59); Rohtak, Punjab Province, British India (now in Haryana, India)
- Known for: Excavations in Harappa
- Scientific career
- Fields: Sanskrit, archaeology

Rai Bahadur Daya Ram Sahni CIE (16 December 1879 – 7 March 1939) was an Indian archaeologist who supervised the excavation of the Indus valley site at Harappa in 1920 to 1921. The first report on Harappan excavations came out on 29 March 1921, published by John Marshall, which is why various historians have chosen 1921 AD as the period of Harappan excavation. A protege of John Marshall, in 1931 Sahni became the first Indian to be appointed Director-General of the Archaeological Survey of India (ASI), a position which he served in till 1935.

== Early life ==
Daya Ram Sahni hailed from the city of Bhera in Shahpur district, Punjab where he was born on 16 December 1879. Sahni graduated in Sanskrit from the Punjab University with a gold medal. He also topped the M. A. examination from the Oriental College in 1903. As a result of these accomplishments, Sahni won the Sanskrit scholarship sponsored by the Archaeological Survey of India and was recruited by the survey after the completion of his education.

== Career ==
In 1903, Sahni was posted to the Punjab and United Provinces circle where he worked under J. Ph. Vogel. Sahni was involved in the excavation of Kasia (in Kushinagar) in 1905 and Rajgir in Bihar under John Marshall during January – February 1906. In September 1907, Sahni assisted Marshall in the excavation of a stupa at Rampurva in Champaran district. He also prepared a catalogue of the archaeological ruins at Sarnath, which he had excavated between 1917 and 1922.

In the spring season of 1907 till 1909, along with Marshall, he excavated the sites of Saheth-Maheth, which were thus confirmed to be site for the ancient city of Shravasti. He later excavated the sites as the Director General during 1927–1932. In 1910, he excavated the medieval site of Mandore, the capital of the Pratiharas, in what is now the state of Rajasthan. He was asked by Marshall to guide D.R. Bhandarkar throughout the excavation process, even though Bhandarkar was senior to him.

Sahni worked as the curator of the Lucknow Museum from 1911 to 1912, when he was transferred to the archaeology department of Kashmir state. When he was in Kashmir, he excavated the Buddhist sites of Parihaspore, Puranadishthana (present-day Pandrethan), and Hushkapura (present-day Ushkur). From 1913 to 1915, he excavated the Vishnu-Shiva temples at Avantipur built by the King Avantivarman.

Sahni returned to Lahore in 1917 and was made incharge of the United Provinces and Punjab. While working as an Assistant Superintendent, Sahni excavated the Indus Valley site at Harappa, the first of the Indus Valley sites to be excavated.

In the 1920 ASI Reports, Daya Ram Sahni describes his explorations starting from 1917 as he had since conducted preliminary investigations at the ancient site near Harappa in Montgomery District. He excavated Harappa again in 1923–1925, then again in 1930–31 with the assistance of Ernest J. H. Mackay.

In 1920, he had also been involved in the exploration and restoration of the ruined temples at Amb and Kafir Kot, while simultaneously recording & translating inscriptions by pre-Islamic kings in the region corresponding to Gandhara.

In 1925, Sahni was transferred to Delhi as Deputy Director-General of the Archaeological Survey of India and in July 1931, he succeeded Harold Hargreaves as the Director-General of the ASI. Sahni was the first native Indian to be appointed to the post.

In the ASI Annual Report for the season 1923–24, Sahni examined the findings from the temple complex at Lakhamandal. During the 1928–1929 season, he edited and published the seven Kushan inscriptions found at Mathura, mostly attributed to Kanishka.

== Retirement ==
After his retirement in 1935, he was appointed by Jaipur State as the Director of its newly established Department of Archaeology. He went on to publish a book on his excavations at the ancient site of Viratnagar, the capital of the Jaipur region in classical times. He also excavated Naliasar and Sambhar during the 1936–1938 season, where he found, among other things, coins from the Moroli Hoard which belonged to the Gupta period.

He also found prehistoric chert artefacts near the Viratnagar site, which influenced many archaeologists in newly independent India. He also conducted excavations in the districts of Gorakhpur and Saran, unfortunately not much is known about these excavations.

== Honours ==
Sahni was awarded a "Rai Bahadur" medal in March 1920 by the Governor of Punjab at a durbar in Rawalpindi. Soon after his retirement from the ASI in 1935, Sahni was made a Companion of the Order of the Indian Empire. The Banaras Hindu University instituted the Dayaram Sahni Gold Medal in his memory.

== Death ==
He died at 7 March, 1939 (at age of 59 years) at Rohtak, Haryana.

== Bibliography ==
- "Obituary. Dayaram Sahni, M.A., C.I.E." Current Science. 8 (6): 280. June 1939. ISSN 0011-3891. Wikidata Q89187986.

Preceded by Harold Hargreaves	Director General of the Archaeological Survey of India; 1931–1935	Succeeded by J. F. Blakiston
