= John Marshall (archaeologist) =

British archaeologist (1876–1958)

Sir John Marshall CIE FBA
- Born: 19 March 1876; Chester, Cheshire, England
- Died: 17 August 1958 (aged 82); Guildford, Surrey, England
- Education: King's College, Cambridge
- Known for: Excavations in Harappa, Mohenjo-daro, Sanchi, Sarnath, Taxila, Crete, and Knossos
- Awards: CIE; Knighthood; FBA
- Scientific career
- Fields: History, archaeology
- Workplaces: Archaeological Survey of India

Sir John Hubert Marshall (19 March 1876 – 17 August 1958) was an English archaeologist who was Director-General of the Archaeological Survey of India from 1902 to 1928. He oversaw the excavations of Harappa and Mohenjo-daro, two of the main cities that comprise the Indus Valley Civilisation.

== Personal history and career ==
Marshall was at school at Dulwich College before King's College, Cambridge, where in 1898 he won the Porson Prize. He then trained in archaeology at Knossos under Sir Arthur Evans, who was rediscovering the Bronze Age Minoan civilization. Under the sponsorship of the British School in Athens, where he attended from 1898 to 1901, he participated in excavations.

In 1902, the new viceroy of India, Lord Curzon, appointed Marshall as Director-General of Archaeology within the British Indian administration. Marshall modernised the approach to archaeology on that continent, introducing a programme of cataloguing and conservation of ancient monuments and artifacts.

Marshall began the practice of allowing Indians to train as archaeologists and supervise excavation. Most of his students were Indian, and so, Marshall gained a reputation for being very sympathetic to Indian nationalism. Marshall agreed with Indian civic leaders and protesters who wanted more self-government, or even independence for India. Marshall was highly admired by Indians during the time he worked in India. In 1913, he began the excavations at Taxila, which lasted for 21 years. In 1918, he laid the foundation stone for the Taxila Museum, which today hosts many artifacts and one of Marshall's few portraits. He then moved on to other sites, including the Buddhist centres of Sanchi and Sarnath.

His work provided evidence of the antiquity of Indian civilisation, particularly that of the Indus Valley civilization and the Mauryan age (Ashoka's Age). In 1920, Marshall initiated at the dig at Harappa with Daya Ram Sahni as director. Mohenjo-daro was discovered by R. D. Banerji in 1921, and in 1922, work began there.

After his appointment, Marshall engaged in constant resource disputes with the Indian government because he felt that the Archaeological Survey of India needed to be revived and that Indian archaeology needed to be overhauled. By using the big finds in 1923 to gain more funding, he avoided a large budget decrease in 1922–1923 that would have endangered excavations at Harappa and Mohenjo-daro.

The results of these efforts, which revealed an ancient culture with its own writing system, were published in the Illustrated London News on 20 September 1924. Scholars linked the artifacts with the ancient civilisation of Sumer in Mesopotamia. Subsequent excavation showed Harappa and Mohenjo-daro to be sophisticated planned cities with plumbing and baths. But Marshall ignored the stratigraphy of the site, and excavated along regular horizontal lines. This mixed up the artifacts from different stratigraphic layers, causing much valuable information about the context of his findings to be lost forever. This mistake was corrected by Mortimer (R. E. M.) Wheeler, who recognised that it was necessary to follow the stratigraphy of the mound rather than dig mechanically along uniform horizontal lines. Also a military precision was brought to archeology by Wheeler.

Marshall also led excavations at the prehistoric Sohr Damb mound near Nal in Baluchistan; a small representative collection of pottery vessels from the site is now in the British Museum.

== Death and legacy ==
Marshall retired from his post in 1934 and then departed India. He died on 17 August 1958, at his home in Guildford, Surrey, some 28 miles southwest of London.

On 22 March 2025, his statue was unveiled in Chennai, Tamil Nadu. Chief Minister M. K. Stalin hailed Marshall and added that he "discovered and announced the Indus Valley Civilisation to the world, opened a new chapter in Indian archaeology".

== Honours ==
Marshall was appointed a Companion of the Order of the Indian Empire (CIE) in June 1910 and knighted in January 1914. He was awarded an honorary degree, Doctor of Philosophy, by Calcutta University in 1921. He was elected as a Fellow of the British Academy in 1936.

== Publications ==
- Indian Archaeological Policy, 1915: Being a resolution issued by the Governor General in Council on the 22nd October 1915.
- Excavations at Taxila: The Stupas and monasteries at Jauliāãn.
- Conservation Manual: A Handbook for the Use of Archaeological Officers and Others Entrusted with the Care of Ancient Monuments.
- Mohenjo-daro and the Indus civilization: Being an official account of archæological excavations at Mohenjo-daro carried out by the government of India between the years 1922 and 1927 . London, 1931. (Volume I: Text, Chapters I—XIX and Plates I—XIV; Volume II: Text, Chapters XX — XXXII, Appendices and Index; Volume III: Plates XV—CLXIV)
- Taxila: An Illustrated Account of Archaeological Excavations Carried Out at Taxila Under the Orders of the Government of India between the Years 1913 and 1934. Cambridge: Cambridge University Press, 1951.
- The Buddhist Art of Gandhara: the Story of the Early School, Its Birth, Growth and Decline.

== See also ==
- Alexander Cunningham
- Joseph David Beglar
- Sir Edward Clive Bayley

Preceded by James Burgess	Director General of the Archaeological Survey of India; 1902–1928	Succeeded by Harold Hargreaves
