= Sarnath =

Buddhist pilgrimage site in India

- Town
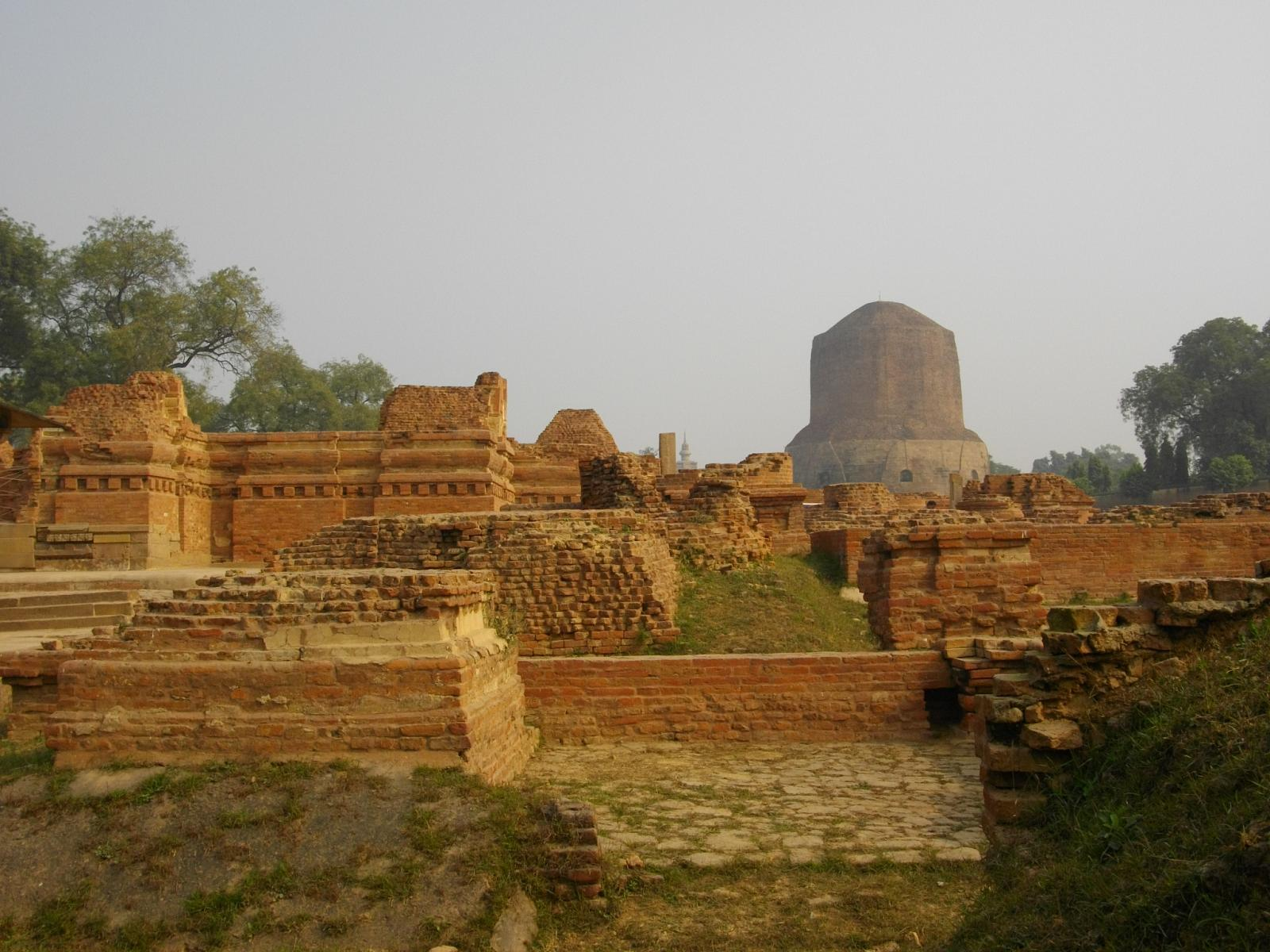
- View of Sarnath, looking from the ancient Mulagandha Kuty Vihara towards the Dhamek Stupa

- Location within India Location within Uttar Pradesh
- Coordinates: 25.3780°N 83.0251°E
- Country: India
- State: Uttar Pradesh
- District: Varanasi

Population (2019)
  - Total: 11,000

Languages
  - Local: Bhojpuri
- Time zone: UTC+5:30

UNESCO World Heritage Site
- Official name: Ancient Buddhist Site of Sarnath
- Criteria: Cultural: iii, vi
- Reference: 927
- Inscription: 2026 (48th Session)
- Area: 8.05 ha
- Buffer zone: 72.2 ha

Translations of Sarnath
- Sanskrit: सारनाथम् (IAST: saraṅga-nāthá)
- Bengali: সারনাথ
- Burmese: ဣသိပတန မိဂဒါဝုန်
- Chinese: 鹿野苑 (Pinyin: Lùyěyuàn)
- Indonesian: Sarnath
- Japanese: サールナート/鹿野苑 (Rōmaji: Sārunāto/Rokuyaon)
- Korean: 사르나트/녹야원(鹿野園) (RR: Sareunateu/Nokyawon)
- Sinhala: සාරනාත්
- Tamil: சாரநாத்
- Thai: สารนาถ
- Vietnamese: Sarnath

Map of Sarnath in relation to other Eight Great Places Buddhist pilgrimage sites and notable nearby cities

Sarnath (also known as Deer Park, Sarangnath, Isipatana Deer Park, Rishipattana, Migadaya, or Mrigadava) is a town northeast of Varanasi, in Uttar Pradesh, India. It was here that the Buddha gave his first sermon after attaining enlightenment at Bodh Gaya. The Lion Capital of Ashoka, raised on a column in Sarnath in 250 BCE by the first Buddhist emperor Ashoka, commemorates this event. It is also the State Emblem of India.

Sarnath is one of the eight most important pilgrimage sites for Buddhists, and has been declared a UNESCO World Heritage Site, being added to the list in 2026.

Sarnath is where Gautama Buddha's sangha first convened, when he gave the first teaching to his original five disciples Kaundinya, Assaji, Bhaddiya, Vappa and Mahanama, known as The First Turning of the Wheel of Dharma. As the Lalitavistara sutra states, the Gautama Buddha chose "Deer Park by the Hill of the Fallen Sages, outside of Varanasi" for his first teaching after he attained enlightenment The teaching is entitled Dhammacakkappavattana sutra. This teaching occurred circa 528 BCE when the Buddha was approximately 35 years of age.

The hagiographic Buddhavamsa says that a previous Buddha called Kassapa Buddha was born in Sarnath. There, like his successor Gautama, he joined a sangha of men and women in order to give his first teaching.

Several sources state that the name Sarnath is derived from Saranganath, which translates to 'Lord of the Deer'. According to one history, during the local king's hunting trip, a male deer (buck) offered to sacrifice himself to save the life of a female deer (doe) that the king was aiming to kill. Impressed, the king then declared his park would thereafter be a deer sanctuary.

According to Sutra 16 of the Mahaparinibbana sutra within the Digha Nikaya, the Buddha named Sarnath as one of four Buddhist pilgrimage sites that devout followers should visit and look upon with samvega or feelings of reverence. The other three sites named by the Buddha are Lumbini, his birthplace; Bodh Gaya, where he achieved enlightenment; and, Kushinagar, where he attained parinirvana.

Sarnath is located eight kilometres (five miles) northeast of Varanasi near the confluence of the Ganges and the Varuna rivers.

== Etymology ==
The name Sarnath derives from the Sanskrit word Sāranganātha (or Sārangnāth in Pali), which translates into English as 'Lord of the Deer.' This name refers to an ancient Buddhist legend, in which Siddhartha Bodhisattva had previously incarnated as a deer. He offered his life in exchange for the life of a doe that a king was planning to kill. The king was so moved by the deer's offering of self-sacrifice that he created a deer sanctuary. The term for deer park is Mriga-dāva in Sanskrit, or Miga-dāya in Pali.

Isipatana is another name used to refer to Sarnath in Pali, the language of the Pali Canon. This name corresponds to Rishipattana in Sanskrit. The terms isi (Pali) and rishi (Sanskrit) refer to an accomplished and enlightened person. Isipatana and Rishipattana therefore translate to "the place where holy men descended", or "the hill of the fallen sages".

== History ==
=== 5th century BCE – 6th century CE ===
Buddhism flourished in Sarnath during the second urbanisation, c. 600– 200 BCE, from the time of the Mahajanapadas through the Nanda Empire and Maurya Empire periods, in part because of patronage from kings and wealthy merchants based in Varanasi. By the 3rd century CE, Sarnath had become an important centre for the Sammatiya, one of the early Buddhist schools, as well as for art and architecture.

The presence of Heruka and Tara images in Sarnath indicate that the later school of Vajrayana was also practised there. Hindu images of Shiva and Brahma were present, while a Jain temple was located very close to the Dhamek Stupa.

By the time of the Gupta Empire (4th to 6th centuries), Buddhism had expanded beyond India via the Silk Road. Faxian was a Buddhist monk from Jin China (Zhōngguó, 中国) who travelled extensively throughout northern India from 400 to 411 CE. In his description of Sarnath, he mentioned seeing four large towers and two viharas with monks residing in them.

=== 6th – 8th centuries CE ===
Buddhism continued to grow during the Later Gupta period. When Xuanzang visited Sarnath around 640 CE, he reported seeing hundreds of small shrines and votive stupas, and a vihara some 61 metres (200 feet) in height containing a large statue of the Buddha. Xuanzang also wrote that "There are about 1500 priests here, who study the Little Vehicle according to the Sammatiya school". Xuanzang mentions a pillar constructed by Ashoka near a stupa that marked the location where the Buddha set the Wheel of the Law in motion.

=== 8th – 12th centuries CE ===
During the Pala (8th–11th centuries) period, the rulers built new mahaviharas such as Odantapuri, Somapura, Jagaddala, and Vikramashila and patronised existing viharas such as Nalanda and Sarnath. Buddhist pilgrims and monks from all over Asia travelled to Sarnath to meditate and study. The Palas were the last major Buddhist dynasty to rule in the Indian subcontinent. They were eventually replaced by the Gahadavala dynasty, whose capital was located at Varanasi.

Although the Gahadavala kings were Hindu, they were supportive of Buddhism. Inscriptions unearthed at Sarnath in the early 20th century indicate that some of the monasteries there enjoyed royal patronage from the Gahadavala rulers. For example, in the mid-12th-century inscription of Queen Kumaradevi (consort of King Govindachandra and member of the Pithipati dynasty of Bodh Gaya), she takes credit for the construction or restoration of a living quarters for monks.

It is widely asserted that the structure referred to in the Kumaradevi inscription is the Dharmachakra Jina Vihar, but the evidence for this is inconclusive. Whatever the case, it is likely to be among the last structures to be built at Sarnath prior to its destruction in 1194. The inscription, excavated at Sarnath in March 1908, is currently maintained at the Sarnath Archeological Museum.

=== Late 12th century: the destruction of Sarnath ===
Along with Sarnath, the most important Buddhist mahaviharas in India were Vikramashila, Odantapuri, and Nalanda, all located in present-day Bihar. All four of these centres of learning continued to thrive throughout the 12th century, probably because of the protection, support and tolerance demonstrated by the Pala and Gahadavala rulers. The Kumaradevi inscription mentions that King Govindachandra protected Varanasi from invasions by the Ghaznavids, which the inscription refers to as "Turushkas". (Note: Turushka is a word for "Muslim Turkish Mercenaries". Bosworth, Clifford Edmund (1980). The Islamic dynasties : a chronological and genealogical handbook. Internet Archive. Edinburgh : Edinburgh University Press. pp. 2, 197. ISBN 978-0-85224-402-9.) By this time, and apart from North India, Buddhism had been declining throughout the Indian subcontinent.

Muslim conquests in the Indian subcontinent in the late 12th century brought massive plunder and destruction to northern India. Most notable among these were the Indian campaigns of Muhammad of Ghor, the Ghurid dynasty ruler from Ghazni, located in present-day Afghanistan. Qutb ud-Din Aibak — the commander of Muhammad of Ghor's army – led his men from Ghazni to Varanasi and Sarnath in 1194 CE. Jayachandra (c. 1170–1194 CE) was the reigning Gahadavala dynasty king at that time and was killed during the Battle of Chandawar. Varanasi and Sarnath were plundered.

Qutb ud-Din Aibak reportedly carted away some 1400 camel loads of treasure. According to the 13th-century Persian historian Hasan Nizami, "Nearly 1000 temples were destroyed and mosques were raised on their foundations; the Rais (rajas) and chiefs of Hind came forward to proffer their allegiance [to the Ghurids]".

While Qutb ud-Din Aibek destroyed Sarnath, it was the troops of Muhammad Bakhtiyar Khalji—another of Muhammad of Ghor's slave generals—that continued to attack, pillage and burn Buddhist sites, perhaps with the acquiescence of local Brahmins (see below). Khalji's forces destroyed Vikramashila in 1193, Odantapuri in 1197, and Nalanda in 1200. Surviving Buddhists fled to Nepal, Sikkim, Tibet, and South India. By the end of the 12th century, Buddhist monastic centers and their vast libraries of suttas, meditation instructions and scriptural commentaries had nearly disappeared from the India subcontinent.

However, according to some scholars, fresh re-assessments of evidence from archaeology in addition to historical records have disputed this view of Muslim invasions as the major cause of the decline of Buddhism in India or the destruction of such Buddhist sites as Sarnath – arguing, instead, "that Brahmanical hostility toward Buddhists resulted in the destruction of Sarnath and other sites". According to archaeologist Giovanni Verardi: "Contrary to what is usually believed, the great monasteries of Gangetic India, from Sarnath to Vikramaśīla, from Odantapurī to Nālandā, were not destroyed by the Muslims, but appropriated and transformed by the Brahmans with only the occasional intervention of the Muslim forces". According to Verardi, "orthodox" Brahmins – who had been gaining in power and influence during the Gahadavala and Sena dynasties, the rival Hindu-revivalist dynasties of northern/eastern India — "accepted Muslim rule in exchange for the extirpation of Buddhism and the repression of the social sectors in revolt." Archaeologist Federica Barba writes that the Gahadavalas built large Hindu temples in traditionally Buddhist sites such as Sarnath, while also converting Buddhist shrines into Brahmanical ones: evidence indicates that Buddhists were expelled from Sarnath, and it was in the process of being converted into a large Shiva temple compound before Muslim invaders arrived.

=== 18th century: rediscovery and looting ===
Few Buddhists remained in Northern India and the Gangetic Plains after their persecution and expulsion at the end of the 12th century by the Ghurids and Brahminical forces. However, Buddhists from Tibet, Burma, and Southeast Asia continued to make pilgrimages to South Asia from the 13th to the 17th centuries, but their most common destination was Bodh Gaya and not Sarnath. Sarnath continued to be a place of pilgrimage for Jains, however. A 17th-century Jain manuscript written in 1612 CE (the Tirthakalpa, by Jinaprabha Suri) describes a Jain temple in Varanasi as being located close to "a famous Bodhisattva sanctuary" at a place called dharmeksā. This Sanskrit word translates to "pondering of the law", and clearly refers to the Dhamek Stupa."

By the late 18th century, India experienced an increase in visitation by Europeans. In 1778, William Hodges became possibly the first British landscape painter to visit. He made careful observations of the art and architecture he encountered. He published an illustrated book about his travels in India in 1794. In his book, he described Islamic mosques and architecture, Hindu temples, and Greek-inspired columns. Hodges also briefly described the Dhamek Stupa, although he mistook it to be a ruined Hindu temple.

In what is the first incontrovertible modern reference to the ruins at Sarnath, Jonathan Duncan (a charter member of the Asiatic Society and later Governor of Bombay) described the discovery of a green marble reliquary encased in a sandstone box in the relic chamber of a brick stupa at that location. The reliquary was discovered in January 1794, during the dismantling of a stupa (referred to by Alexander Cunningham as stupa "K" or the "Jagat Singh stupa", later identified as the Dharmarajika Stupa) by employees of Zamindar Jagat Singh (the dewan of Maharaja Chait Singh, the Raja of Benares). Duncan published his observations in 1799.

The reliquary contained a few bones and some pearls, which were subsequently thrown into the Ganges river. The reliquary itself has also disappeared, although the outer sandstone box was replaced in the relic chamber, where it was rediscovered by Cunningham in 1835. The bricks of the stupa were hauled off and used for the construction of the market in Jagatganj, Varanasi. Jagat Singh and his crew also removed a large part of the facing of the Dhamek Stupa, and removed several Buddha statues which he retained at his house in Jagatganj.

=== 19th century: more looting and early archeological excavations ===
The next modern description of Sarnath was by Francis Buchanan-Hamilton, who visited the site around 1813. He drew a crude map of the site—which he called Buddha Kashi—at that time. Colin Mackenzie was an officer in the British East India Company who later became the first Surveyor General of India. Visiting Sarnath in 1815, he was the first to describe a dedicated exploration of the ruins. Throughout the early 19th century, amateur archeologists explored and excavated at Sarnath, removing antiquities, and several artists drew sketches of the site (especially of the Dhamek Stupa).

In 1835–1836, a 21-year-old British Army engineer with the Bengal Engineer Group named Alexander Cunningham conducted the first systematic archaeological excavations at Sarnath. He had carefully studied the writings of Faxian and Xuanzang, two Chinese Buddhist monks who travelled extensively throughout northern India in the early 5th and early 7th centuries, respectively. Based on their writings and those of Duncan, he conducted some careful measurements and excavations at Sarnath in 1835–1836. During the course of these excavations, Cunningham discovered and removed many statues from monastery "L" and temple "M", as well as the sandstone box reported by Duncan from the Dharmarajika Stupa. He presented these items to the Asiatic Society of Bengal, and they are now located in the Indian Museum in Kolkata. By 1836, Cunningham had conclusively identified Sarnath as the location of the Buddha's first sermon. In 1861, Cunningham became the founder and first Director-General of the Archaeological Survey of India.

In 1851–1852, Markham Kittoe (1808–1853) conducted further excavations at Sarnath. Kittoe noted the presence of four stupas at Sarnath and excavated a structure he described as a hospital, which was located roughly midway between the Dhamek and Jagat Singh stupas. He also recovered a seated Buddha statue from Jagat Singh's house and transcribed its inscription. In his writings, Kittoe speculated that Sarnath was destroyed as a result of a great fire.

Sometime in the mid-19th century, Sarnath was subjected to further depredations, as 48 statues and a tremendous amount of bricks and stones were removed from the historic site to be used in the construction of two bridges over the Varuna River. A final instance of despoilation occurred around 1898, when many bricks and stones were removed from Sarnath and used as ballast for a narrow-gauge railway that was under construction at that time.

=== 20th century: extensive excavations and restoration ===
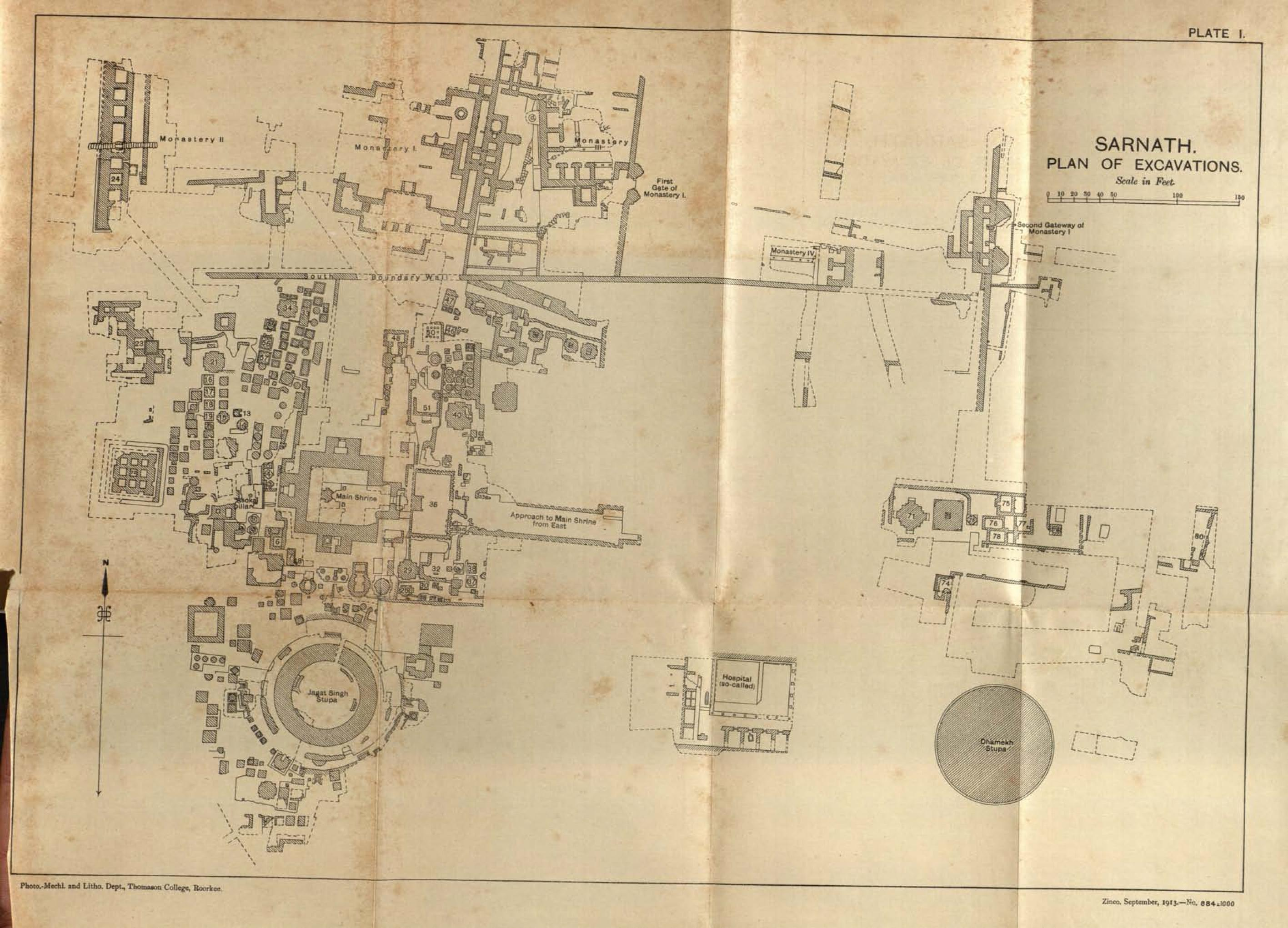
Friedrich Oertel's plan of excavation. The lion capital was found in 1905 to the west of the main shrine, which is to the north of the "Jagat Singh" stupa.

Friedrich Oertel conducted extensive excavations in 1904–1905. His team focused on the area near stupa "J" (the Dhamek Stupa), stupa "K" ("Jagat Singh stupa", now known as the Dharmarajika Stupa), monastery "L", temple "M", hospital "N", monastery "O", and the Ashokan pillar. In March 1905, the team exhumed parts of the base and shaft of the pillar with its Schism Edict, lion capital, and remnants of the dharmachakra sculpture. Dating to c. 241-233 BCE, these are the oldest and most important relics discovered at Sarnath thus far. J. Ph. Vogel translated the inscription—which was written in the Brahmi of the Maurya period-and tentatively dated it to 249 BCE.

== Present day ==
According to the Mahaparinibbana Sutta (Sutta 16 of the Digha Nikaya), the Buddha mentioned Sarnath as one of the four places of pilgrimage his devout followers should visit and look upon with feelings of reverence. During the British East India's colonial rule, ancient sites such as Sarnath were subjected to extensive archaeological study. Certain levels of restoration occurred decades later.

Consequently, Sarnath has regained its former status as a place of pilgrimage, both for Buddhists and Jains. In 1998, Sarnath was nominated for inclusion on the United Nations Educational, Scientific and Cultural Organization (UNESCO) list of World Heritage Sites of outstanding universal value to cultural heritage. The nomination comprises two groups of monuments: group "A" is represented by the Chaukhandi Stupa, while all other monuments (e.g., temples, stupas, monasteries, and the pillar of Ashoka) are included as part of group "B".

The sites of the greatest importance to Buddhist pilgrims include:

- The Dhamek Stupa is considered to mark the location of the Buddha's first teaching. Scholars believe that the name of the stupa might be a combination of the words 'Dharma Chakra', which means Turning the Wheel of Dharma. A reliquary stupa was built on the site after the Buddha's passing, and then likely modified by Ashoka who in 249 BCE was recorded as changing the stupa while he was gathering and redistributing the Buddha's relics. Its inner chambers had held reliquaries. It is an impressive structure, 39 metres (128 feet) high and 28 metres (92 feet) in diameter.
- The Dharmarajika Stupa is one of the few pre-Ashokan stupas remaining at Sarnath, although only the foundations remain. It has been the subject of extensive depredations and archaeological excavations, from the late 18th through the early 20th century.
- The Ashokan pillar erected here was broken during the invasions of the 12th century but many of the pieces remain at the original location. The pillar was originally surmounted by the Lion Capital of Ashoka, which in turn served as the base of a large 32-spoke sandstone wheel of dharma. The capital and wheel are on display at the Sarnath Archeological Museum, and they symbolize the modern state of India. Both of these appear on the emblem of the Supreme Court of India, and the wheel of dharma is incorporated in the flag of India.
- The ruins of the ancient Mulagandha Kuty Vihara marking the place where the Buddha spent his first rainy season. This was the main temple later noted for the presence of the Ashokan pillar at the front. The fifth-century CE sandstone sculpture of Buddha Preaching his First Sermon was found in the vicinity. The current Mulagandha Kuty Vihara, dating from the 1930s, holds some small bone relics of the Buddha.
- The Dharmachakra Jina Vihar, a massive monastery and living quarters for monks believed to have been constructed or restored in the mid-12th century at the behest of Kumaradevi, a wife of Govindachandra (c. 1114–1155 CE).
- The remains of the Chaukhandi Stupa, located 800 metres (1/2 mile) outside of Deer Park, commemorate the place where the Buddha reunited with his first five disciples Kaundinya, Assaji, Bhaddiya, Vappa, and Mahanama. It is capped with an octagonal brick tower erected as a memorial to Emperor Humayun by his son Akbar in 1588 CE.
- The Sarnath Archeological Museum houses the famous Lion Capital of Ashoka, which survived a 14-metre (45 ft) drop to the ground from the top of the Ashokan pillar, and became the State Emblem of India and national symbol on the flag of India. The museum also houses the original fifth-century CE sandstone sculpture of Buddha Preaching his First Sermon, as well as the Kumaradevi inscription.

== Modern places of worship ==
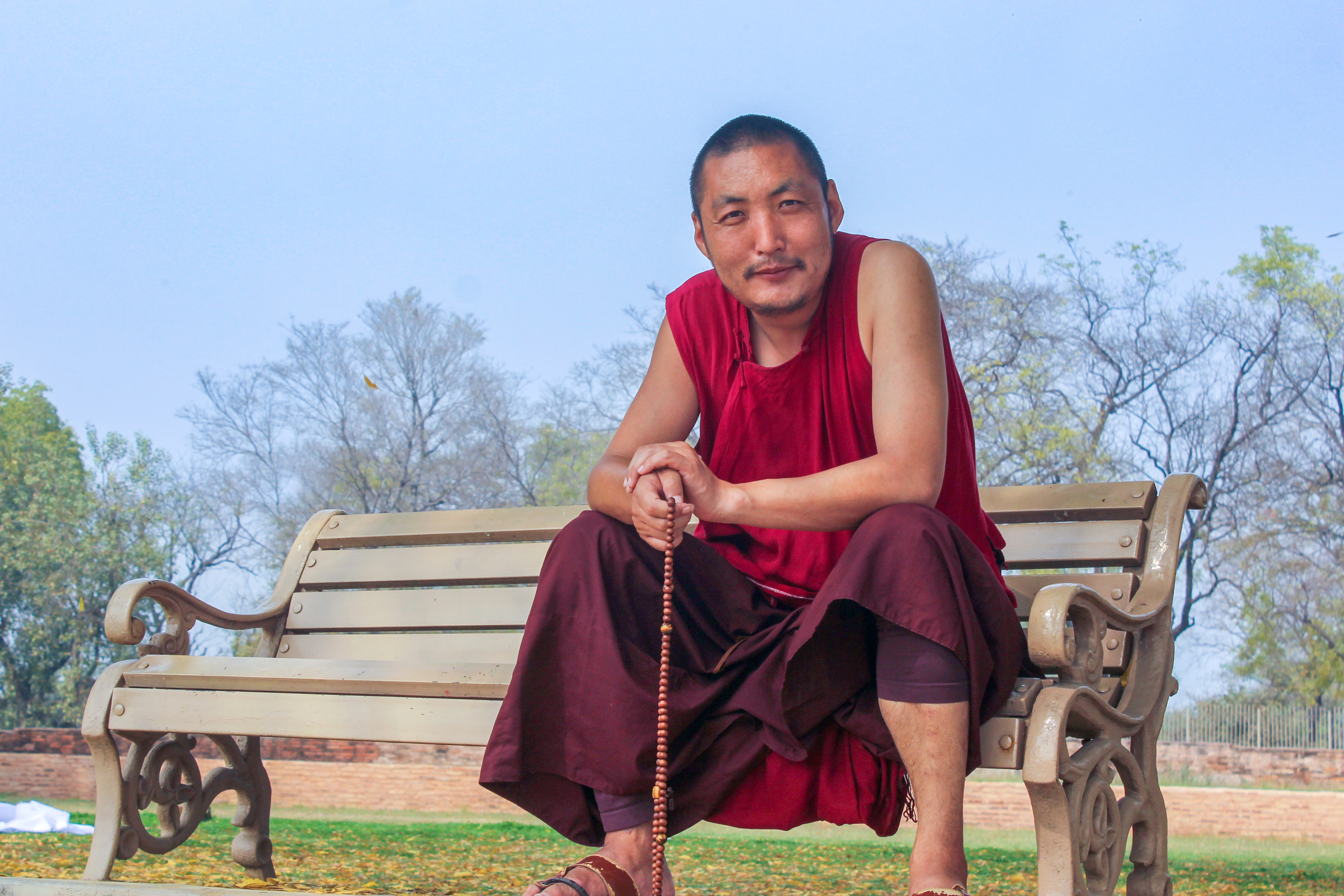
Buddhist monk in Sarnath

In addition to the archaeological ruins, there are a number of other pilgrimage sites and places of worship in Sarnath. Among these are included:

- The modern Mulagandha Kuty Vihara is a temple constructed by the Maha Bodhi Society; it was opened to the public in 1931. Wealthy Hawaiian philanthropist and benefactor Mary Robinson Foster provided much of the financial support for this project, while Anagarika Dharmapala supervised its construction. Dharmapala was a Sri Lankan Buddhist monk who was instrumental in the revival of Buddhism in India after it had been virtually extinct in that country for seven centuries. The temple contains a gilded replica of a 5th-century CE sculpture of Buddha Preaching his First Sermon. Its interior walls are extensively decorated with frescoes by Japanese artist Kosetsu Nosu (1885–1973), depicting important events in the life of the Buddha.
- Anagarika Dharmapala Museum & offices of the Maha Bodhi Society, located on Dharmapala Road, just south of the modern Mulagandha Kuty Vihara
- A standing Buddha statue, 24.3 m (79 ft 9 in) in height, inspired by the Buddhas of Bamiyan, is located on the grounds of the Thai temple and monastery at Sarnath. Construction began in 1997, and the statue was unveiled in 2011.
- A number of countries and regions in which Buddhism is a major religion (such as Cambodia, China, Japan, Korea, Myanmar, Sri Lanka, Thailand, Tibet, and Vietnam) have established temples and monasteries in Sarnath in the style that is typical for their respective cultures, so visitors can gain insight into Buddhism from the perspectives of many different cultures.
- A bodhi tree planted by Anagarika Dharmapala which has grown from a cutting of the one at Bodh Gaya
- Padmasambhava Buddhist Center: Padma Samye Chokhor Ling Monastery, Orgyen Samye Chokhor Ling Nunnery, Khenchen Palden Sherab Rinpoche Stupa
- Vajra Vidya Institute for Higher Buddhist Studies
- Garden of Spiritual Wisdom, located on the grounds of the Chaukhandi Stupa

== As a Jain pilgrimage site ==
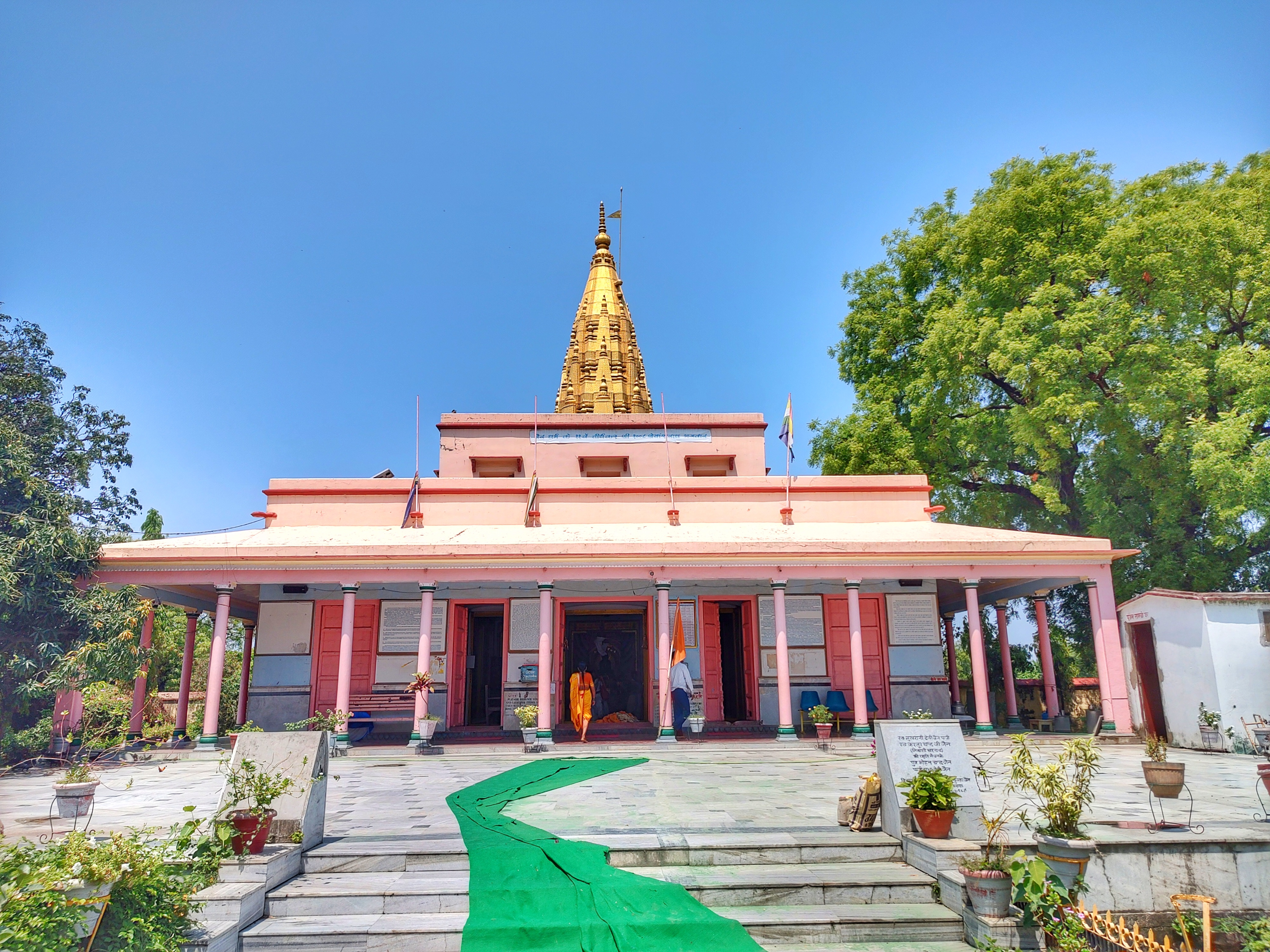
Sarnath Jain Tirth

Singhpur (Simhapuri), a village approximately 1.7 kilometres (1 mile) northwest of Sarnath, is believed to be the birthplace of Shreyansanatha, the 11th tirthankara of Jainism. It is also the place where four of the five auspicious life events of Shreyansanatha took place. According to Jain cosmology, the fifth auspicious life event is the attainment of moksha. Shreyansanatha was among the twenty Jain tirthankaras who attained moksha in Sametshikhar.

Sarnath has been an important pilgrimage site for Jains for centuries. A 17th-century Jain manuscript describes a Jain temple in Varanasi as being located close to "a famous Bodisattva sanctuary" at a place called dharmeksā. This Sanskrit word translates to "pondering of the law", and clearly refers to the Dhamek Stupa. The current edifice—Sarnath Jain Tirth (also known as the Shri Digamber Jain Temple or Shreyanshnath Jain Temple)—was constructed in 1824. Located only about 70 metres (230 feet) southwest of the Dhamek Stupa, this temple is dedicated to Shreyansanatha. The main deity of this temple is a blue-coloured statue of Shreyansanatha, 75 centimetres (30 inches) in height, in the lotus position.

== Other tourist attractions ==
Tourist attractions unrelated to Buddhism and spirituality in Sarnath include the Sarnath Deer Park and Fish Canal, and the Sarnath Turtle Breeding and Rehabilitation Centre.

Tourist arrival in Sarnath
Year	International	Domestic	Total
2013	362,113	838,566	1,200,679
2014	374,268	899,457	1,273,725
2015	388,102	924,552	1,312,654
2016	409,242	957,320	1,366,562
2017	430,682	1,024,589	1,455,271
2018	435,752	1,070,035	1,505,787
2019	336,136	1,132,615	1,468,751

== In English literature ==
In her 1832 poetical illustration Sarnat, a Boodh Monument., to a picture by Samuel Prout, Letitia Elizabeth Landon compared the four major religions of the world and mentioned the persecution and subsequent expulsion of the Buddhists from India.

Sarnath is one of the locations of Rudyard Kipling's 1901 novel Kim. Teshoo Lama stays at the "Temple of the Tirthankhers" in Sarnath when not on his pilgrimages.

"The Nameless City" is a fictional short story published in 1921 by H. P. Lovecraft. When the narrator of this story sees the ruins of the Nameless City, he "thought of Sarnath the Doomed, that stood in the land of Mnar when mankind was young, and of Ib, that was carven of grey stone before mankind existed." Lovecraft had previously described the fictional city of Sarnath in his 1920 story "The Doom That Came to Sarnath".

== Gallery ==
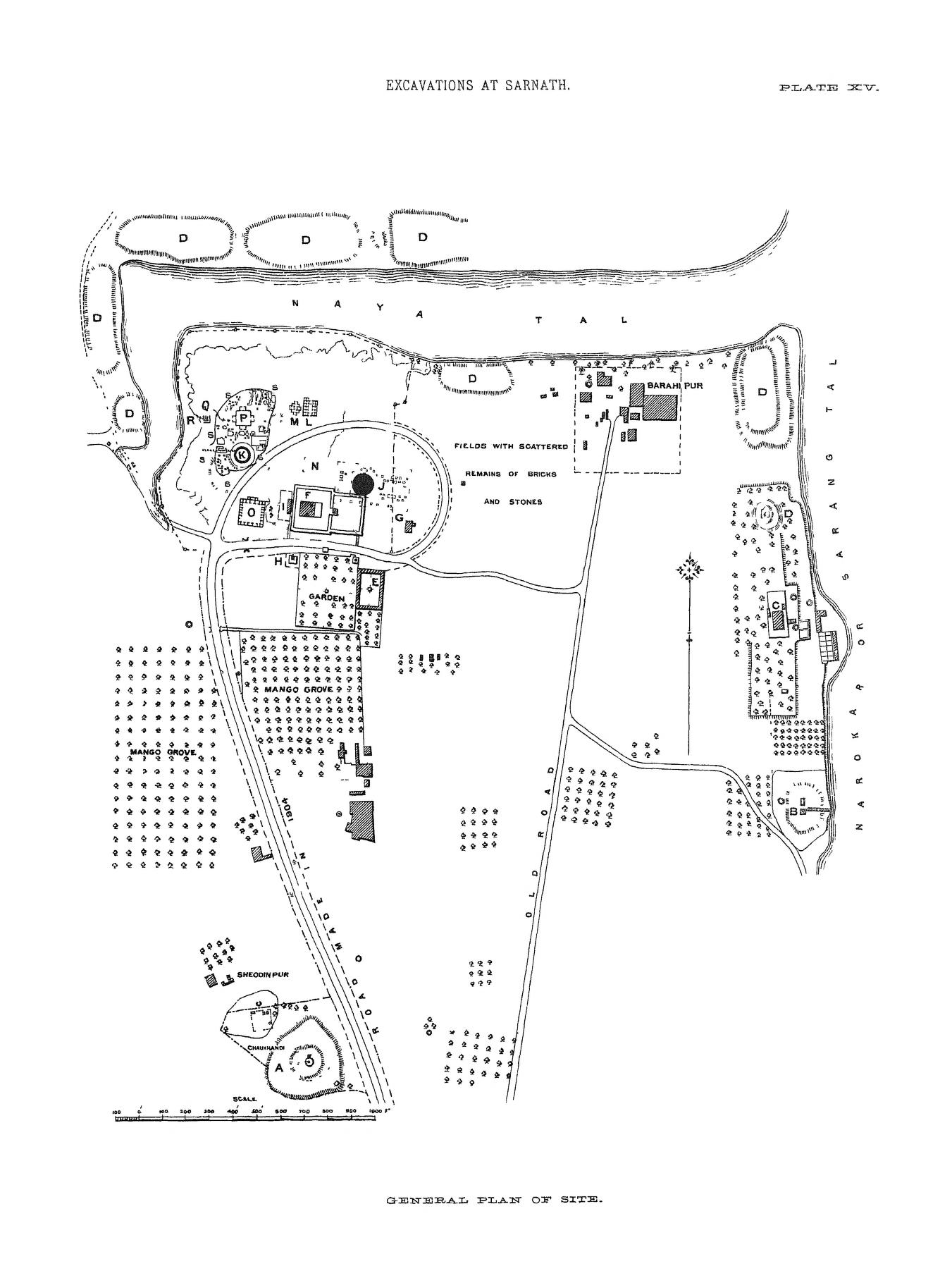
Plan of excavations at Sarnath, with sites labelled using Alexander Cunningham's terminology (1835)

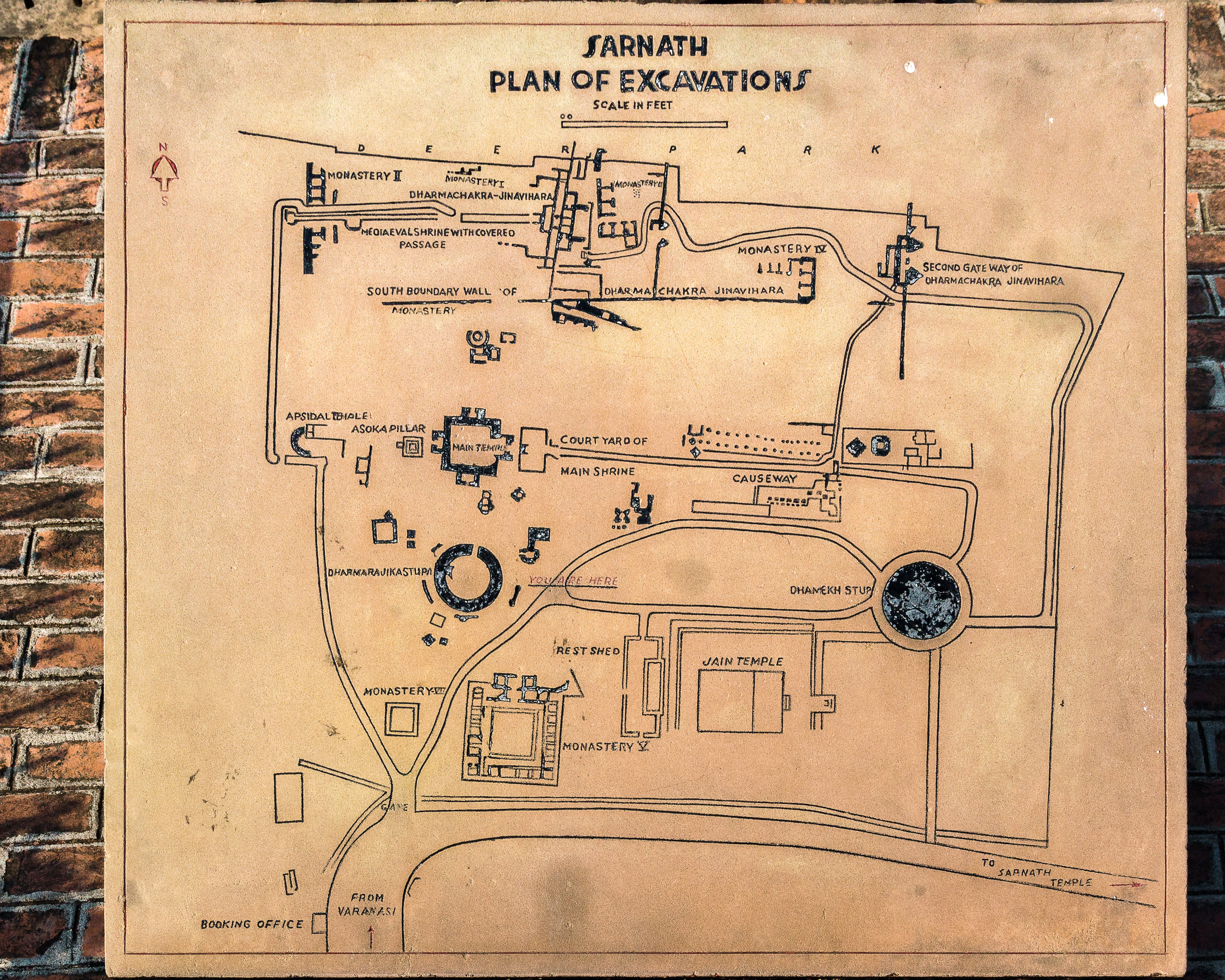
Plan of excavations at Sarnath, with sites labelled using contemporary English terminology

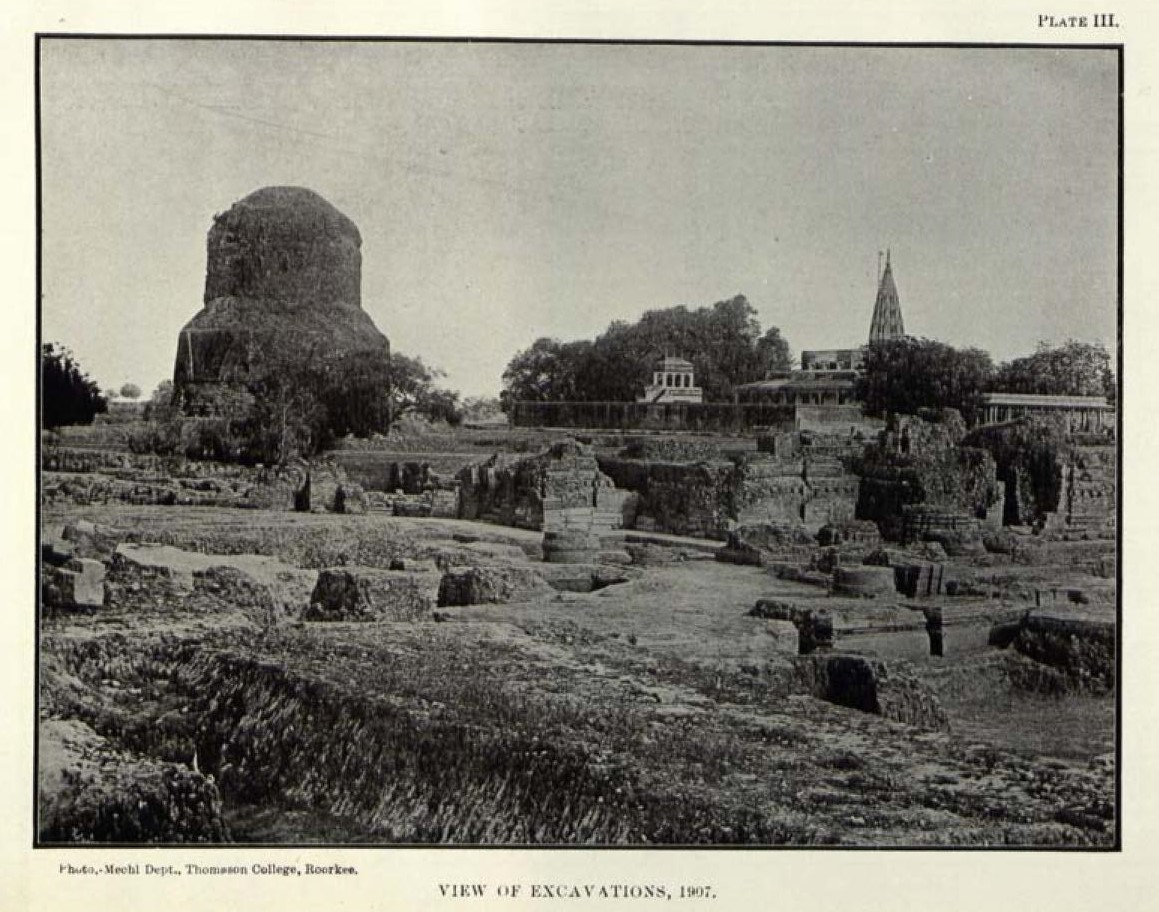
View of Sarnath during archaeological excavations, 1907. Camera angle from the ruins of the ancient Mulagandha Kuty Vihara towards the Dhamek Stupa; the Sri Digamber Jain temple can be seen on the right side of the photograph.

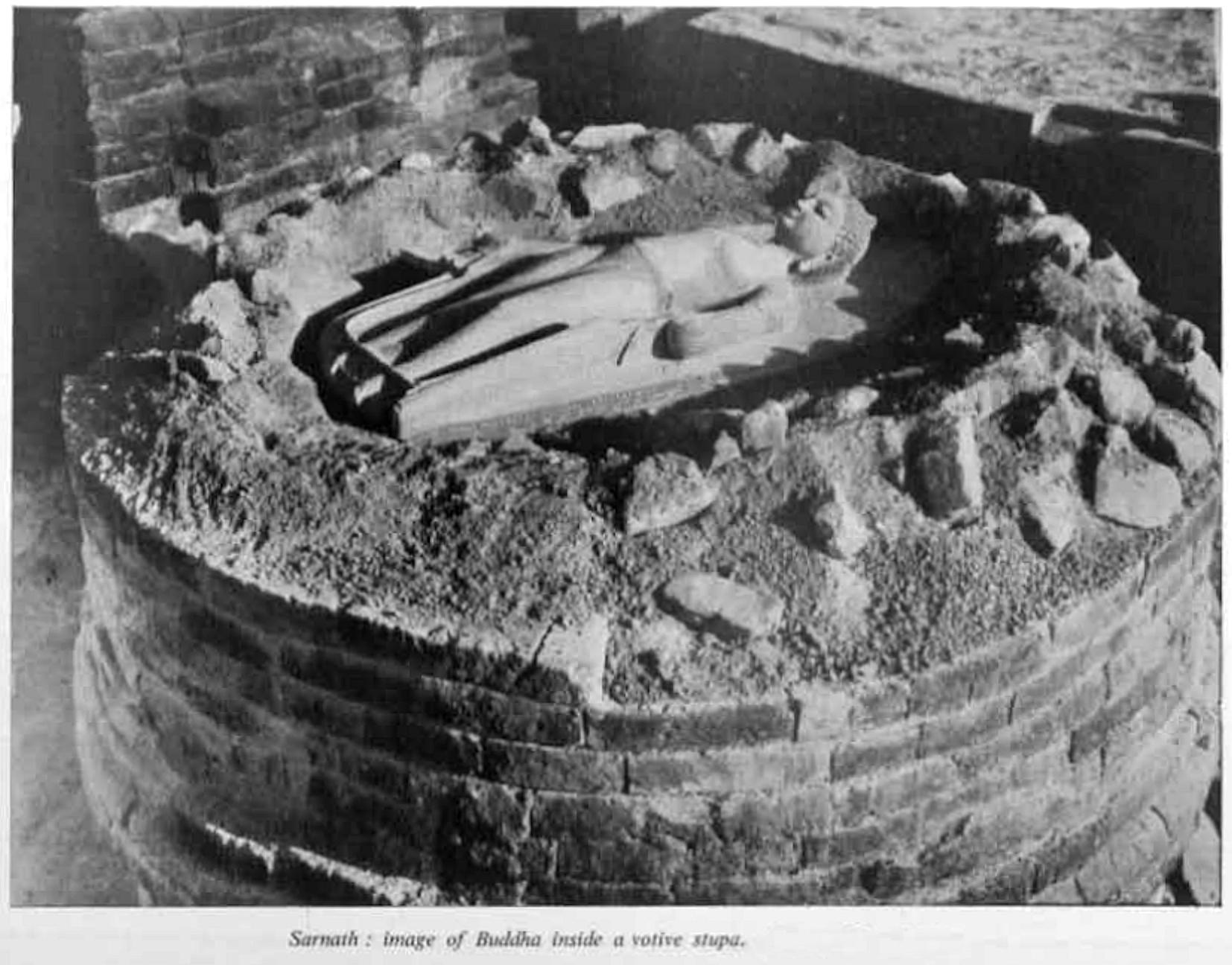
Buddha statue inside a votive stupa at Sarnath

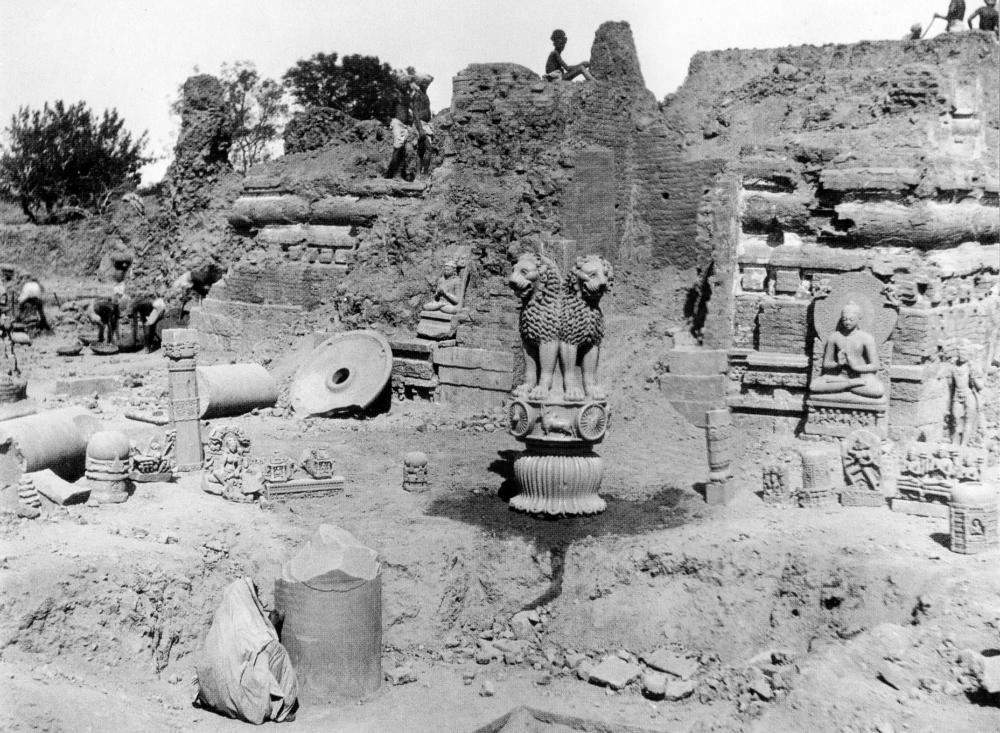
The Lion Capital of Ashoka, the Buddha Preaching his First Sermon sculpture, and the Ashokan pillar, along with other antiquities as they appeared upon their exhumation at Sarnath on 15 March 1905 (photograph by F. O. Oertel).

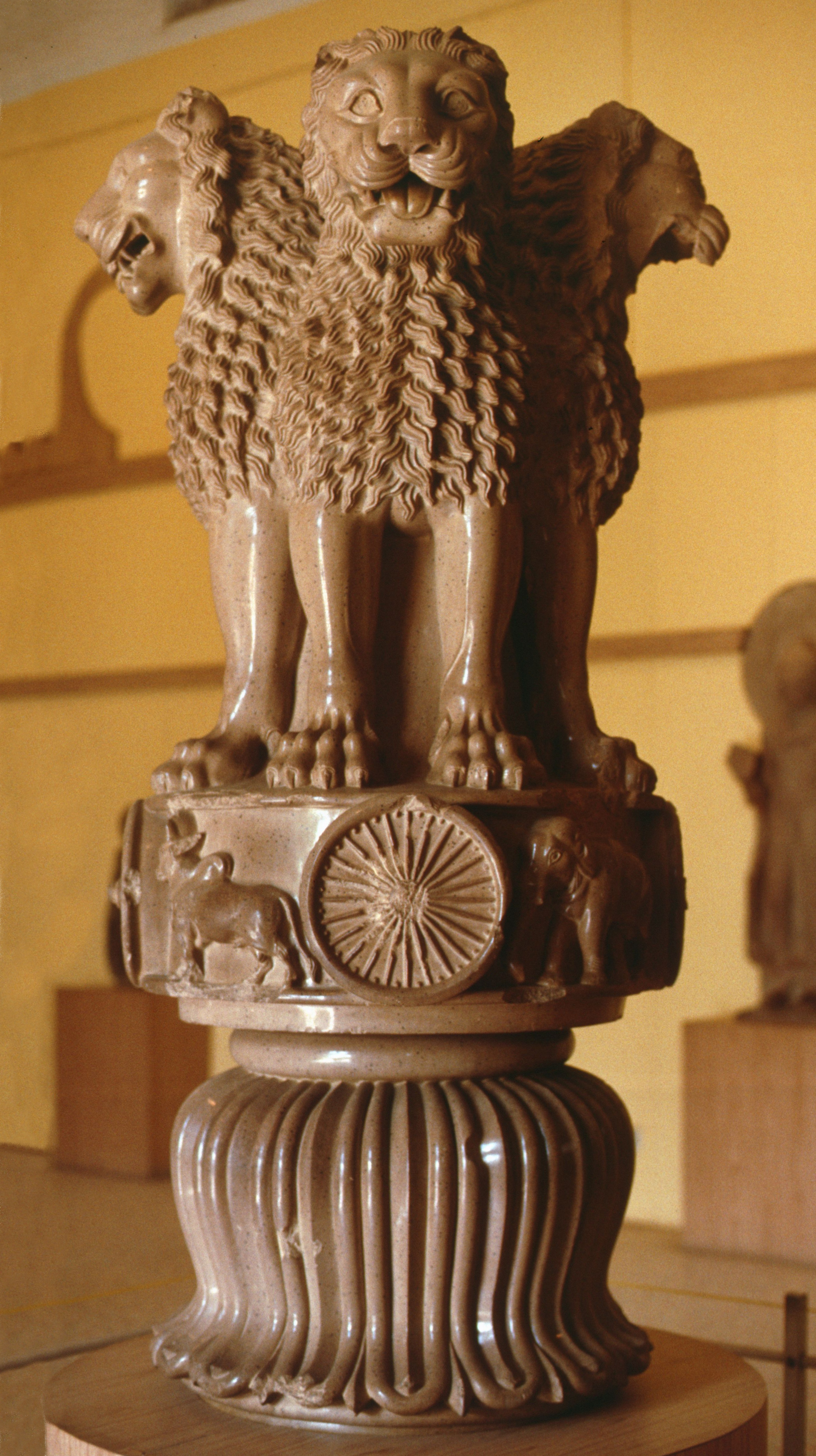
The Lion Capital of Ashoka and national emblem of India, now located in the Sarnath Archeological Museum, as it appeared in 2011

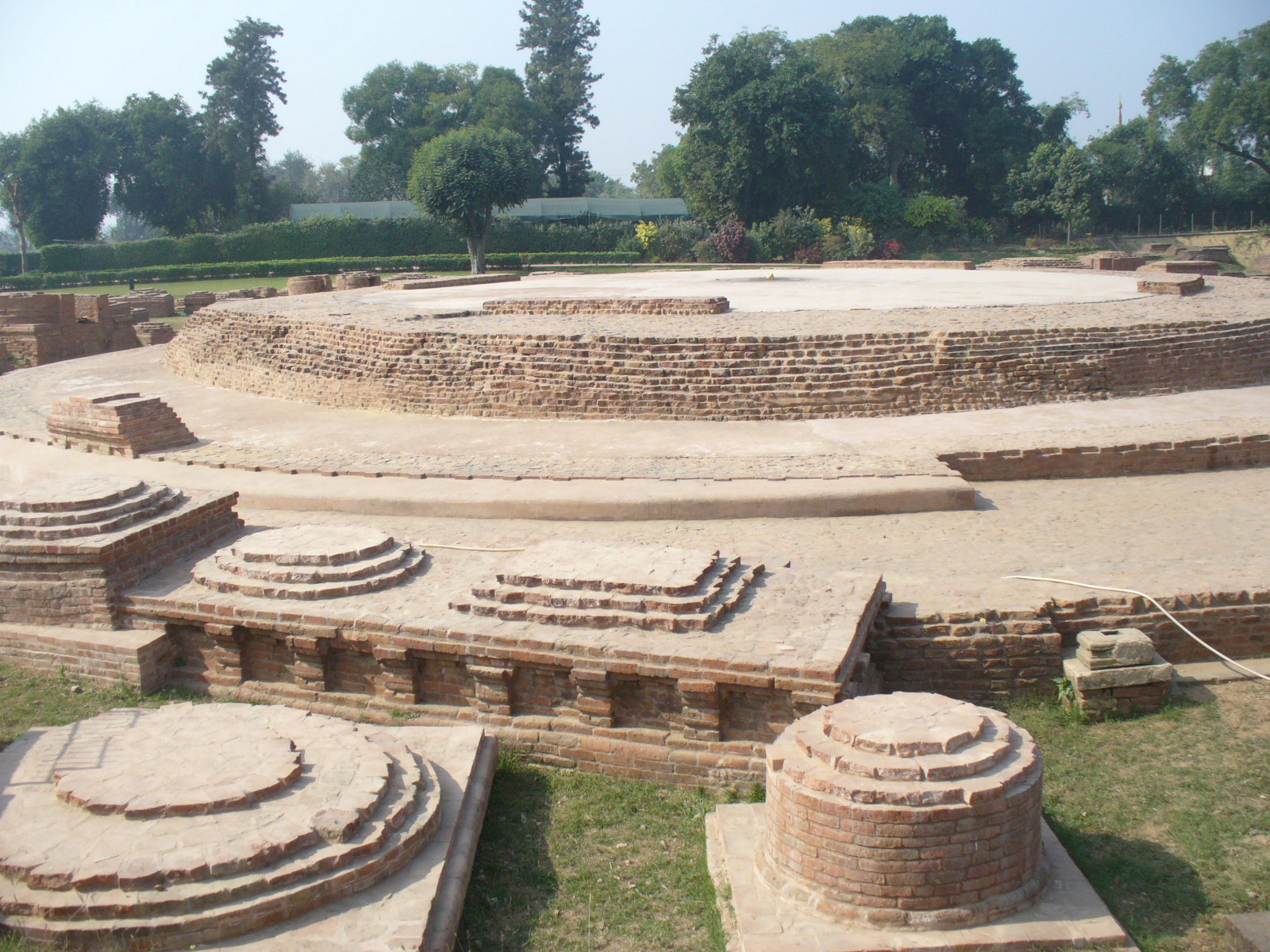
Dharmarajika Stupa, from the pre-Ashokan period, as it appeared in 2007

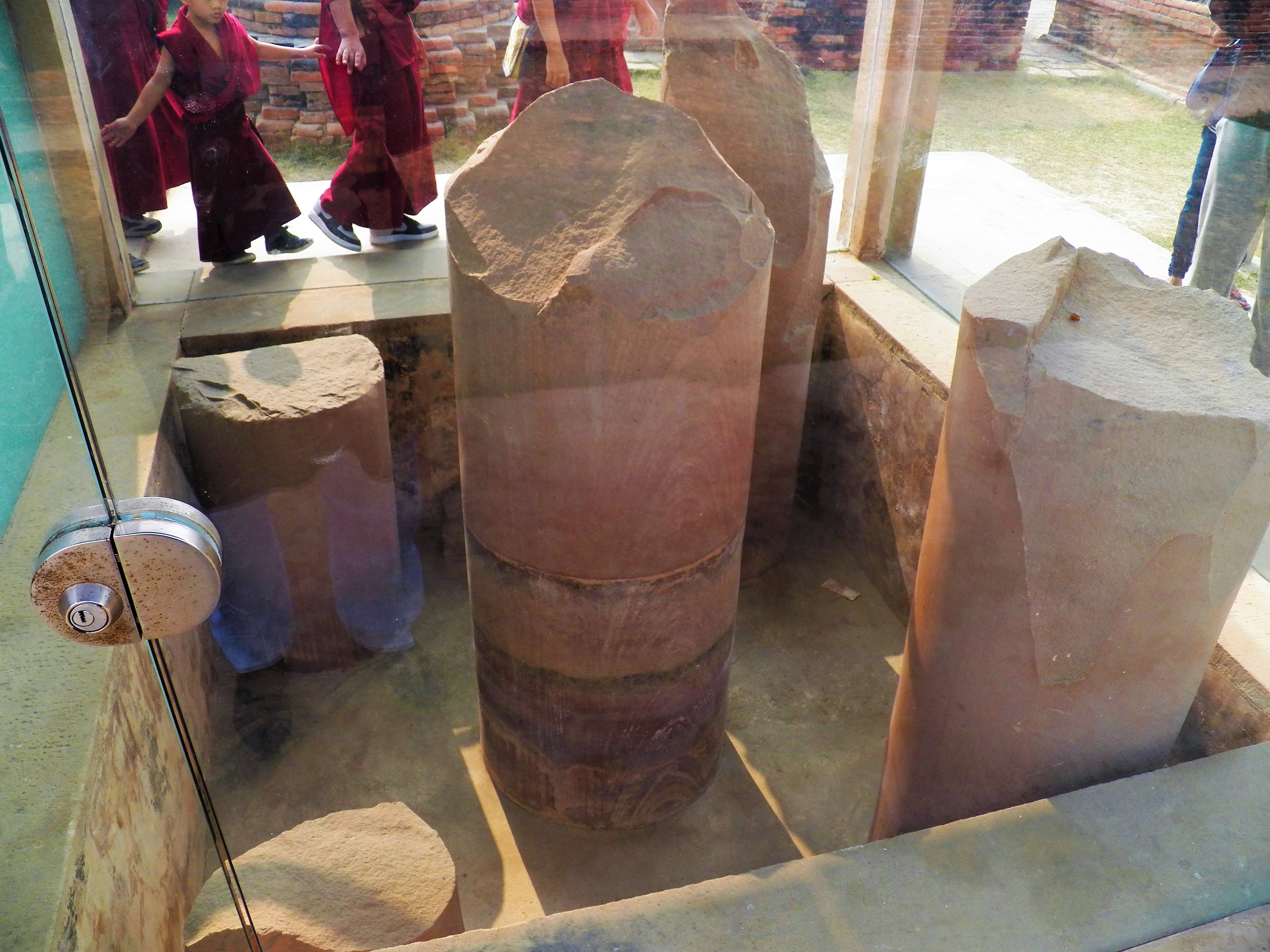
Pieces of the pillar of Ashoka at Sarnath, as they appeared in 2016, protected behind a glass enclosure

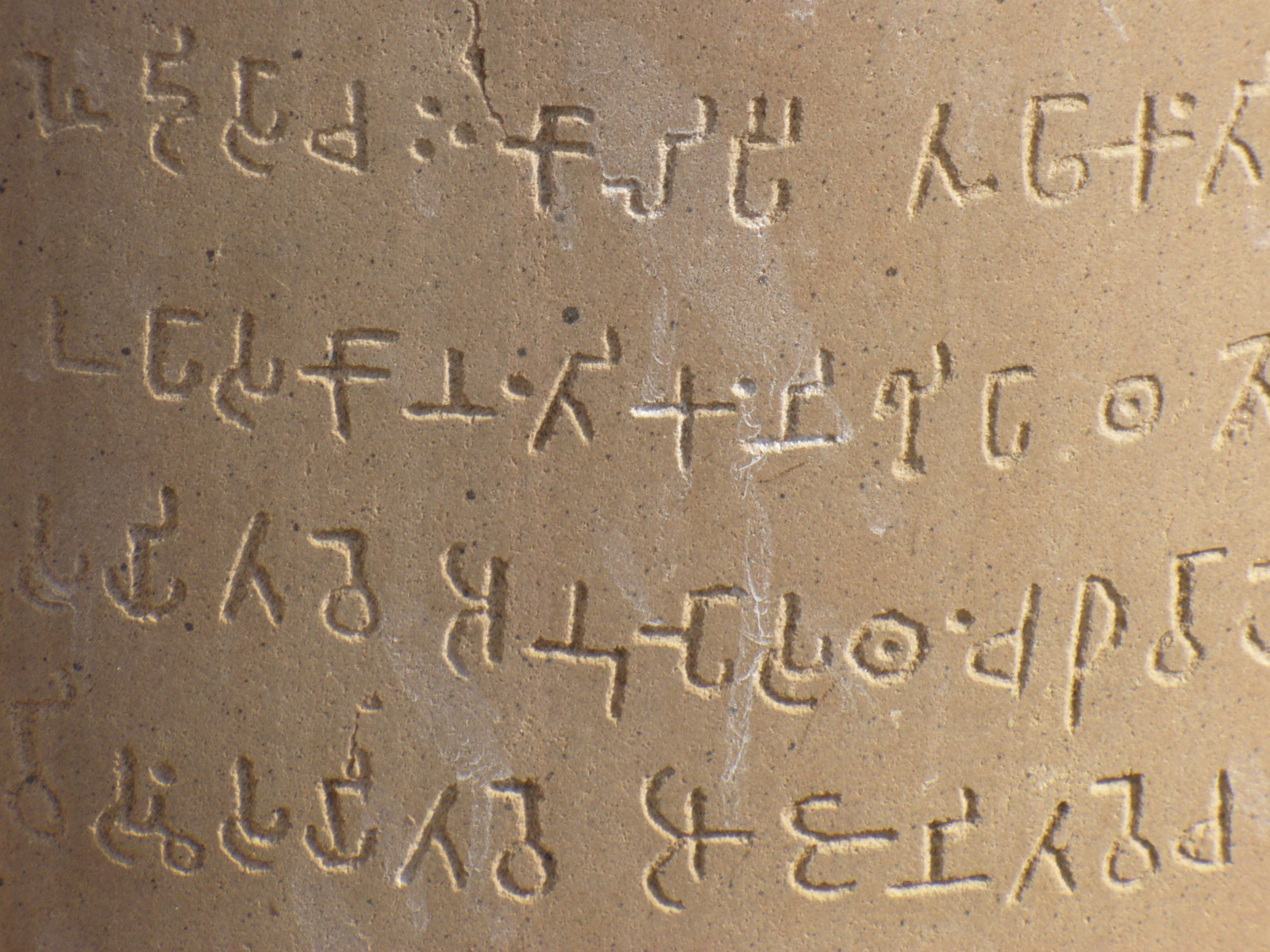
Brahmi inscription on the main pillar of Ashoka at Sarnath

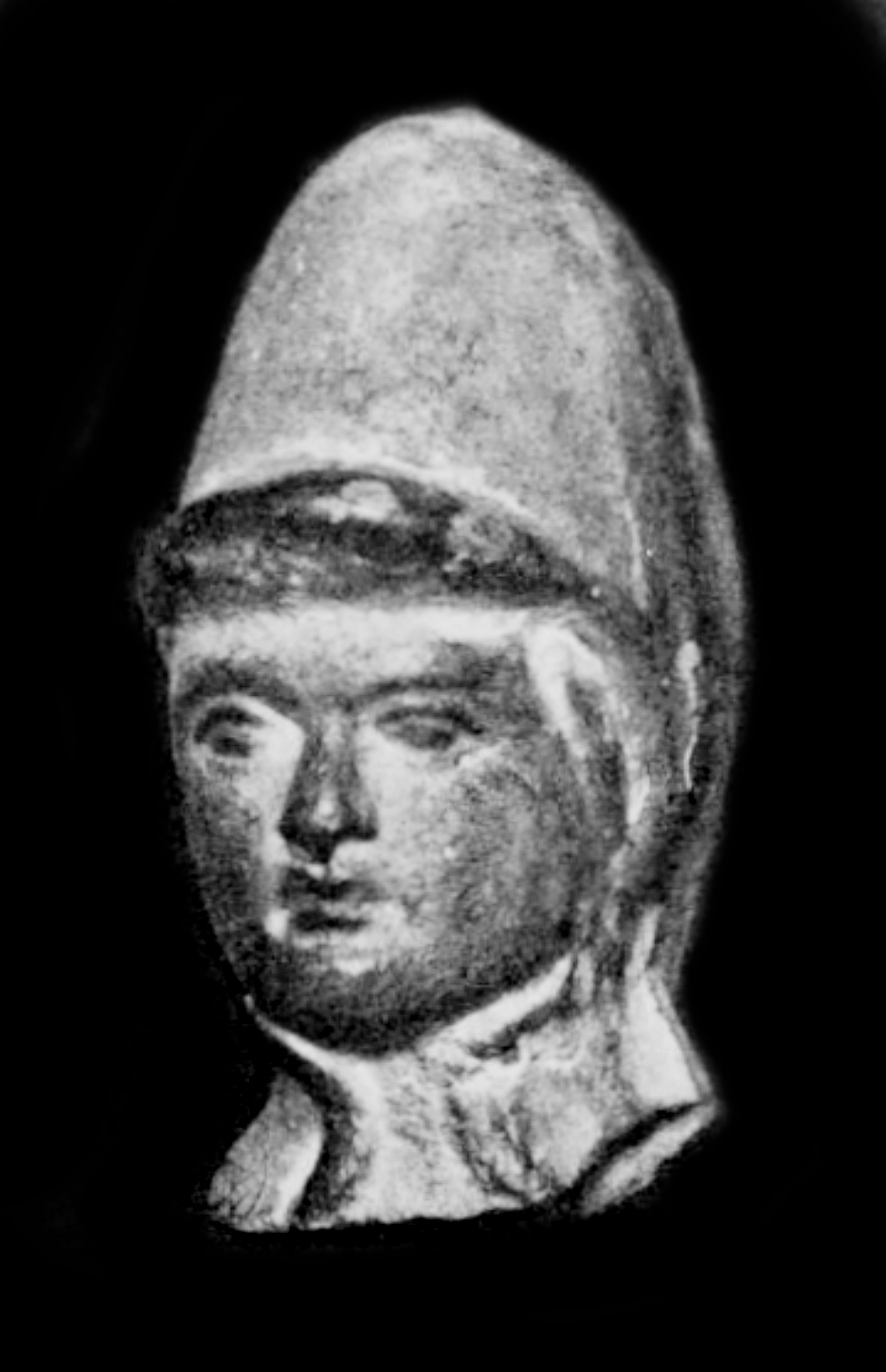
Greco-Persian sculpture of the head of a West Asian foreigner from the Maurya period, Sarnath Museum

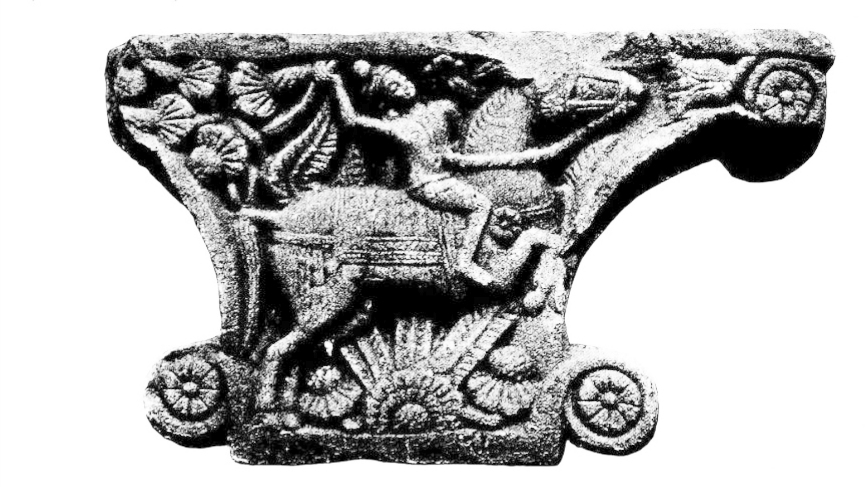
Perso-Ionic capital of the Mauryan period, excavated at Sarnath

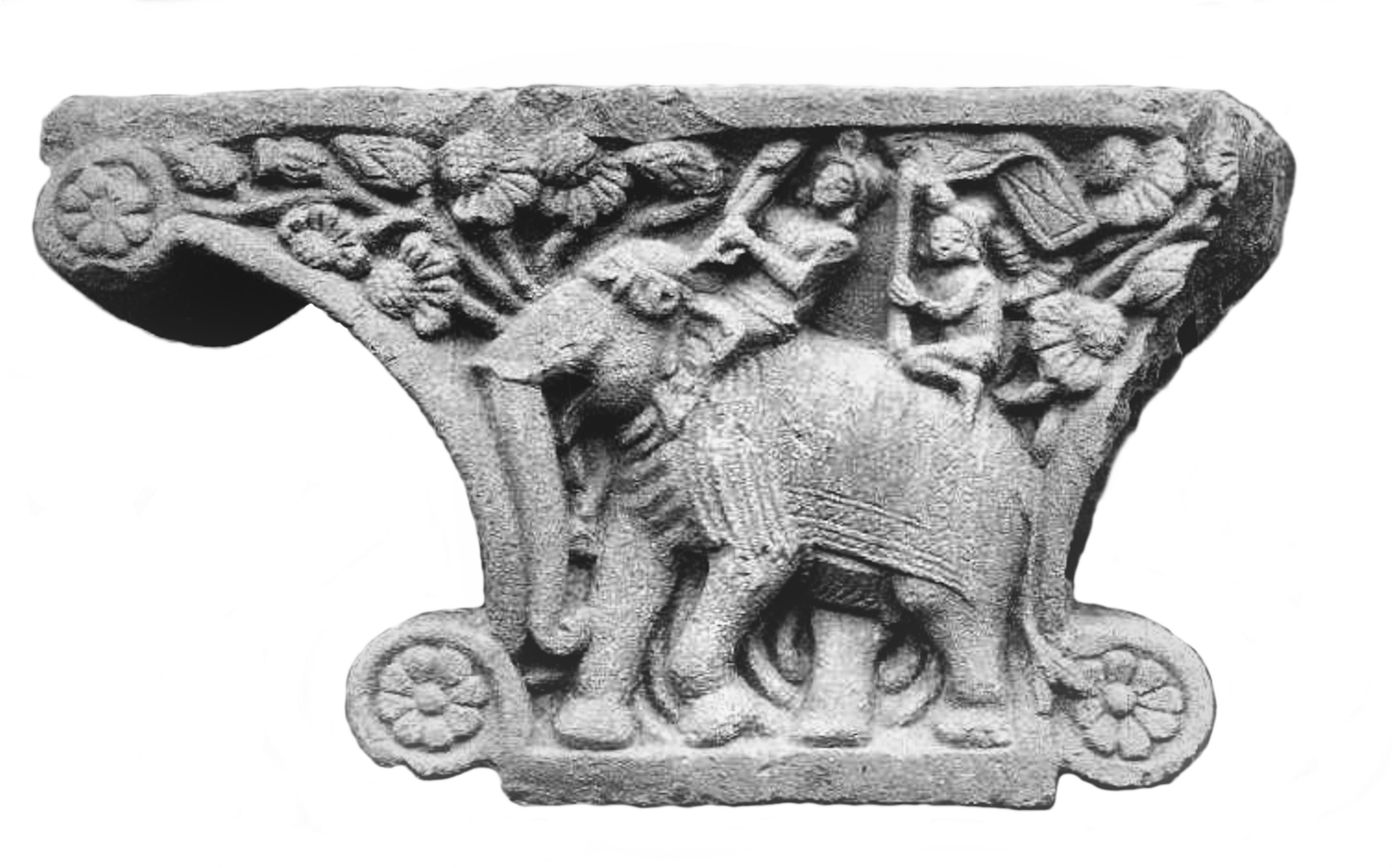
Opposite side of the same capital, excavated at Sarnath, depicting an elephant

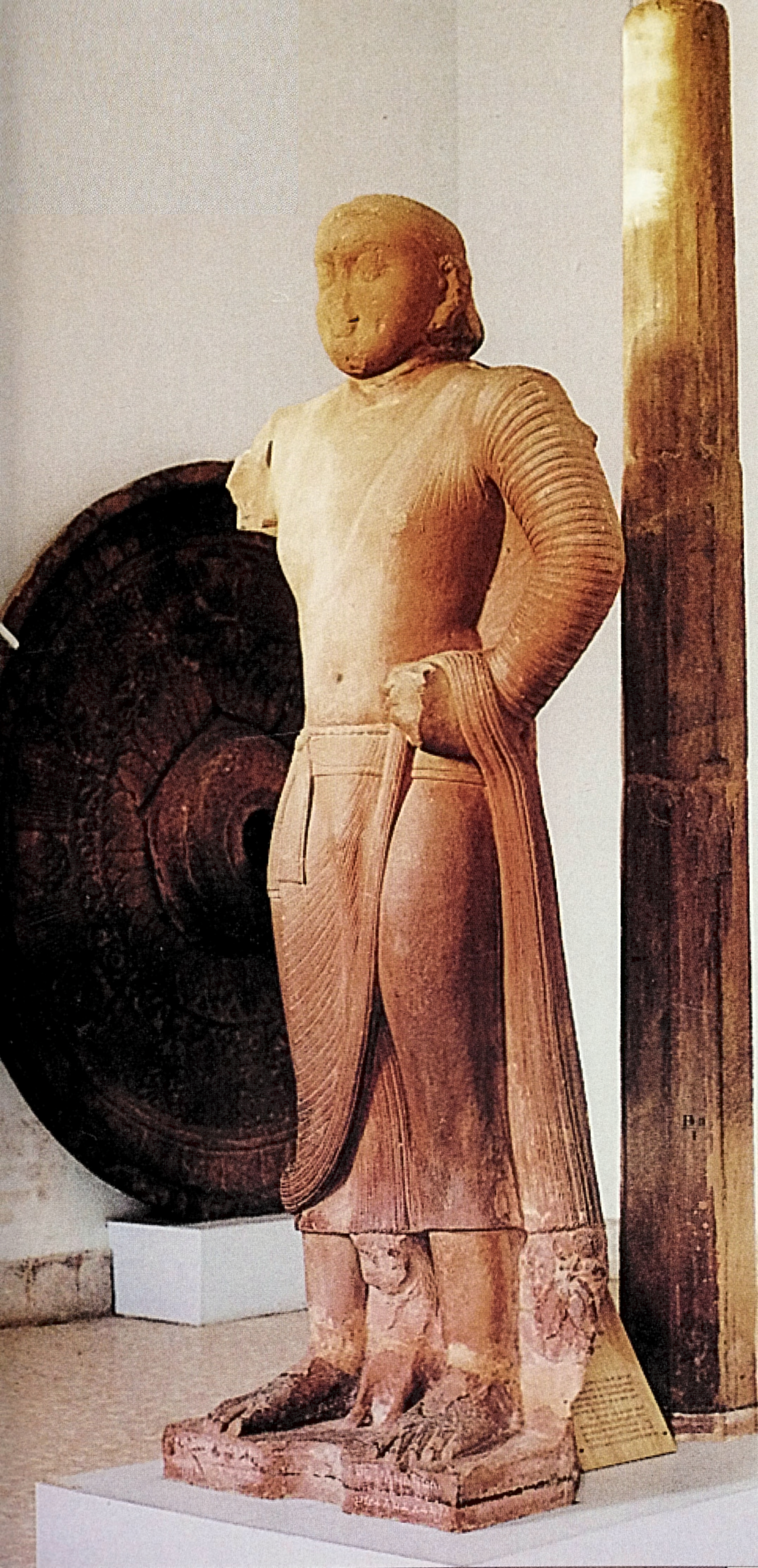
The Bala Bodhisattva, an important statue for dating Indian art, was discovered at Sarnath. The statue was dedicated in "the year 3 of Kanishka" (circa 129 CE).

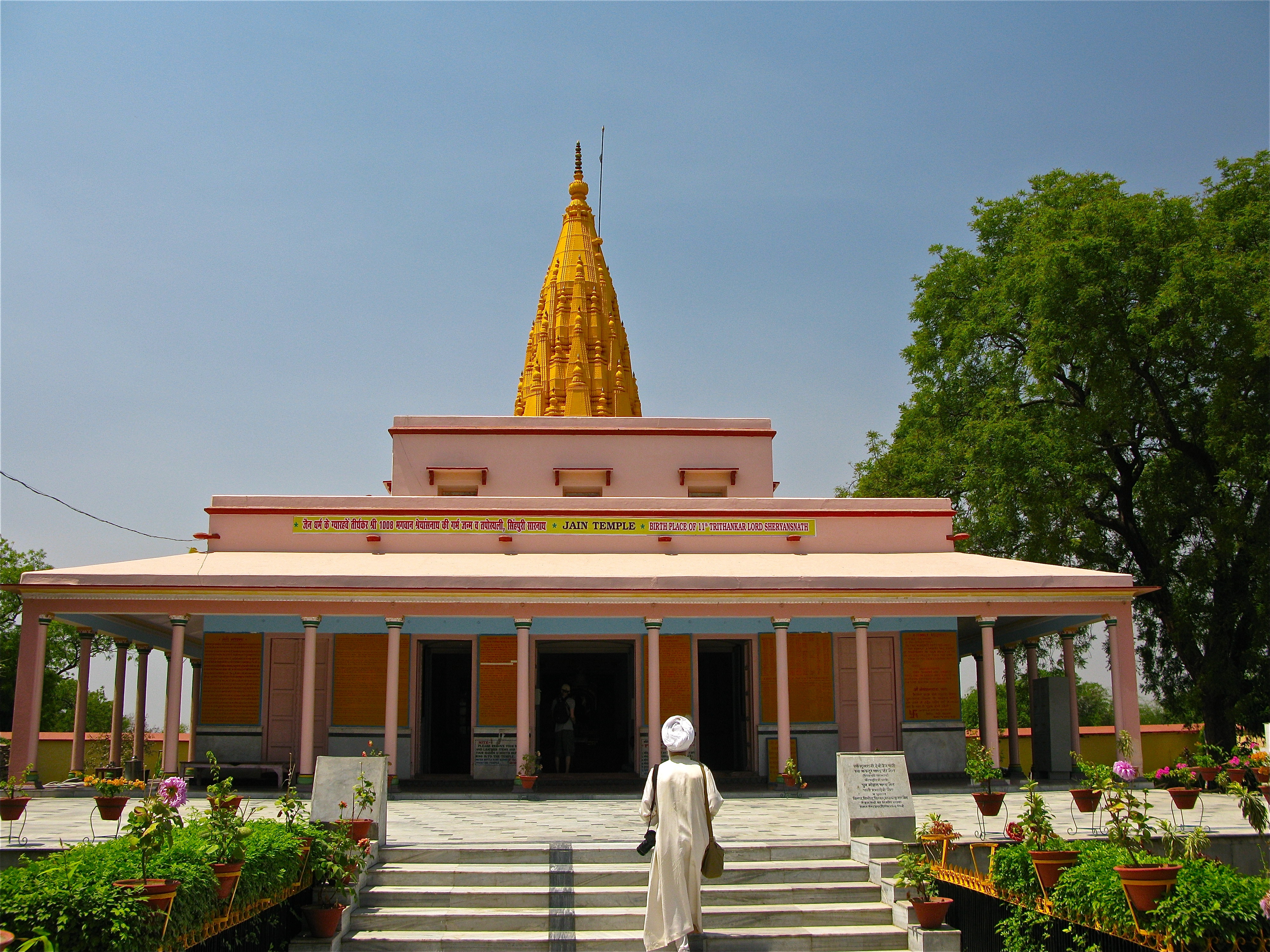
Exterior of the Sri Digamber Jain temple at Sarnath

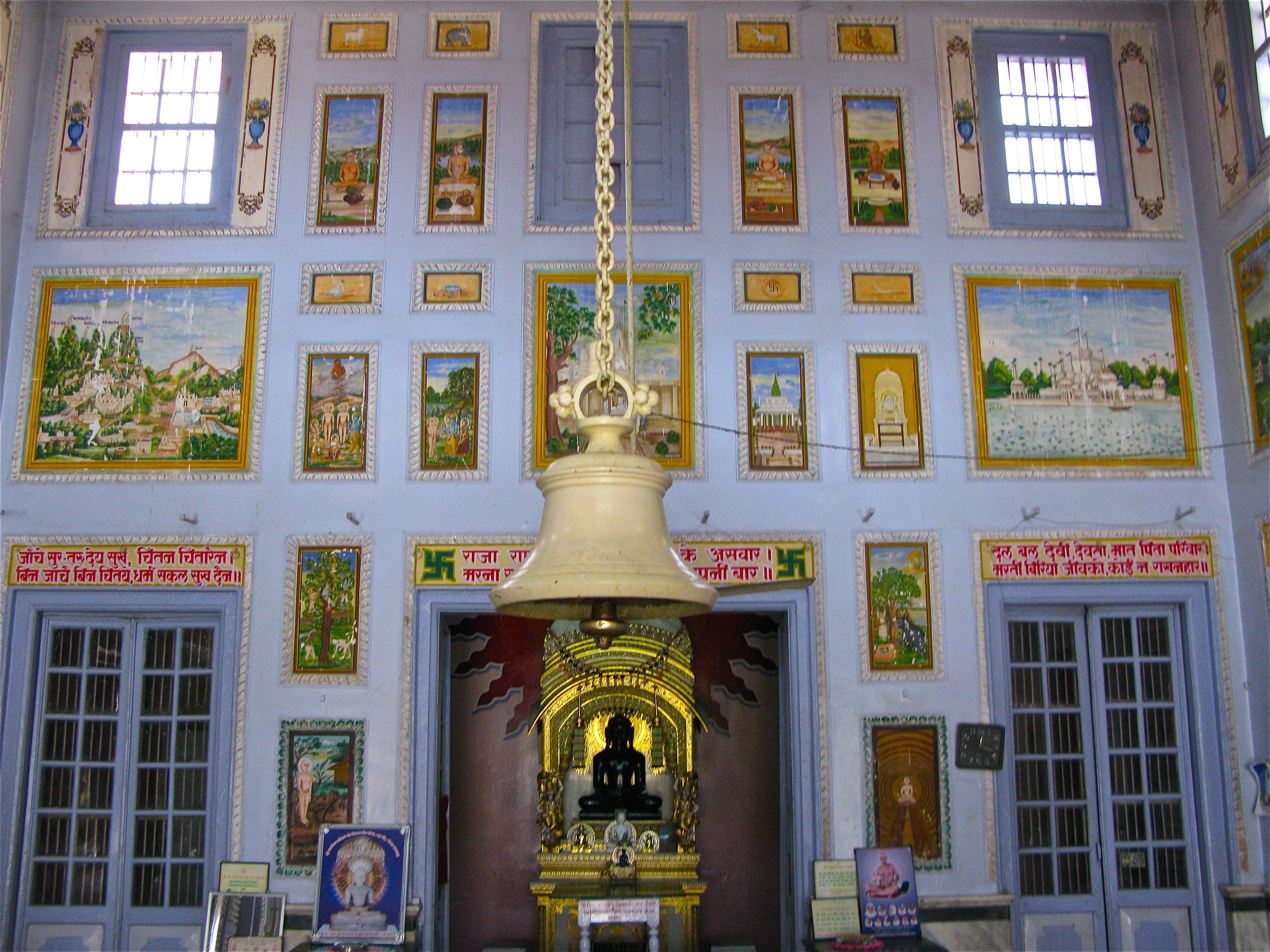
Interior of the Sri Digamber Jain temple at Sarnath

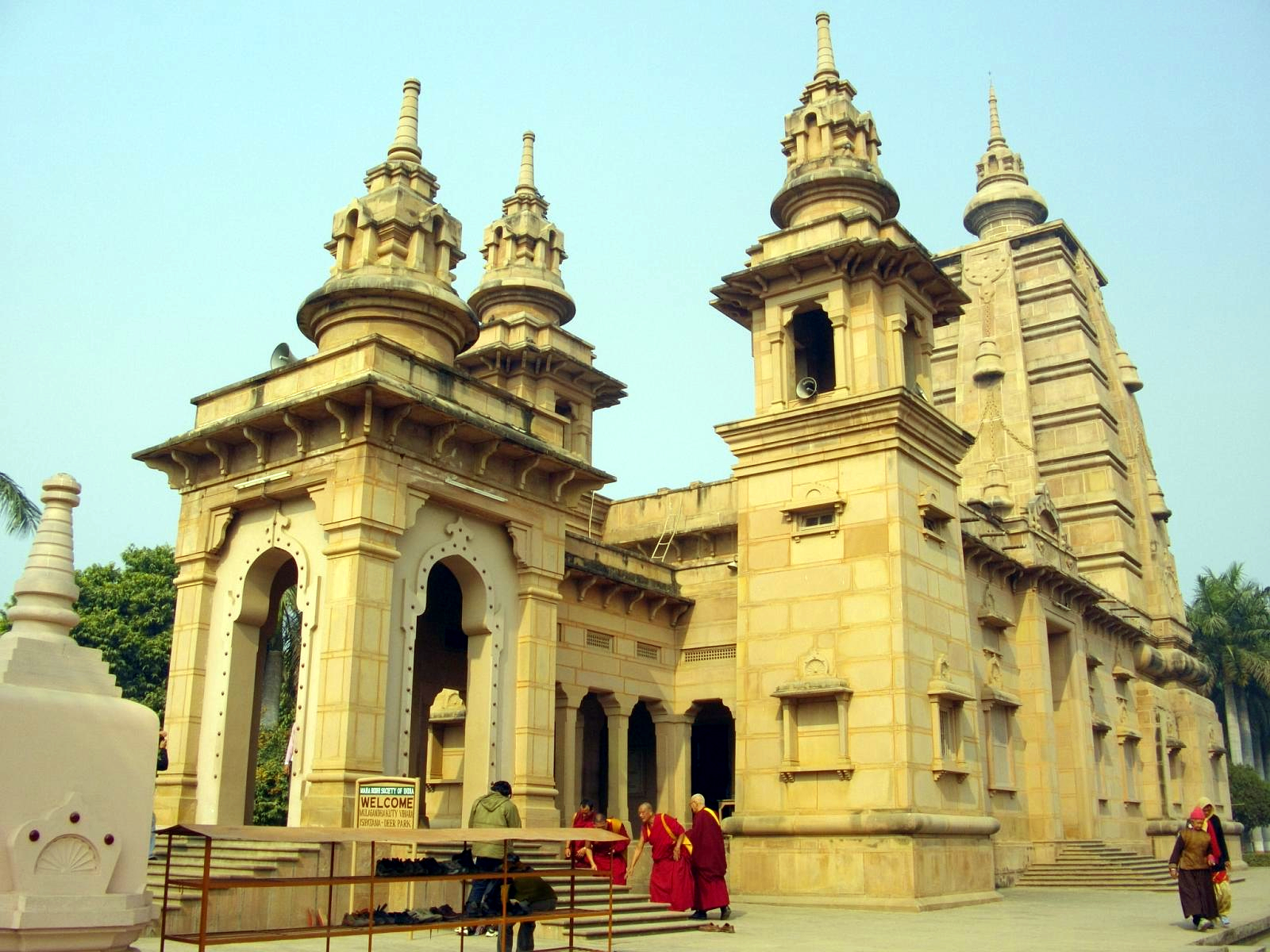
The modern Mulagandha Kuty Vihara, a Buddhist temple constructed by the Maha Bodhi Society at Sarnath

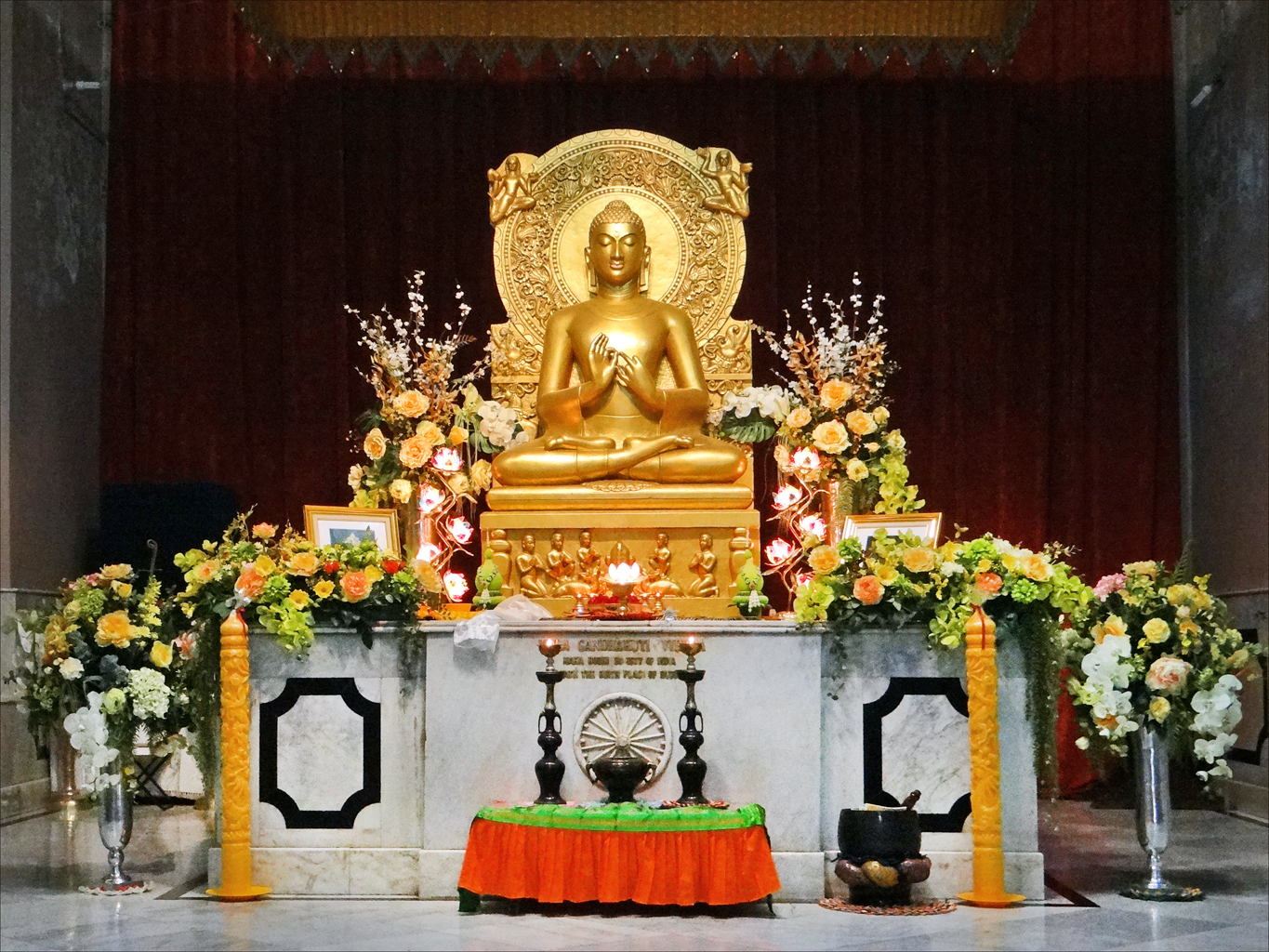
A replica of the Buddha Preaching his First Sermon sculpture, located in the modern Mulagandha Kuty Vihara

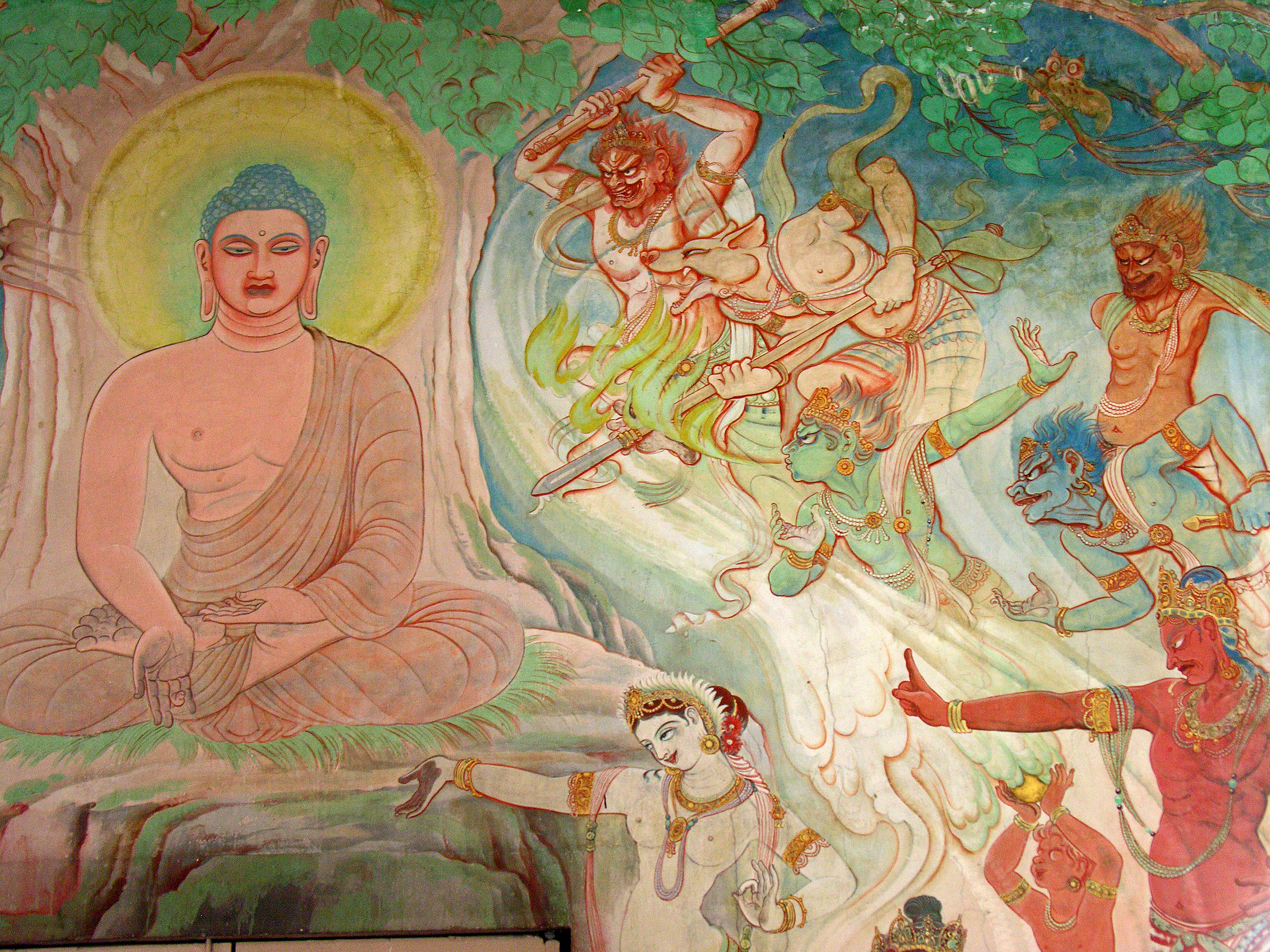
Fresco in the modern Mulagandha Kuty Vihara, by Japanese artist Kosetsu Nosu depicting the Maras attempting to distract the Buddha from gaining enlightenment

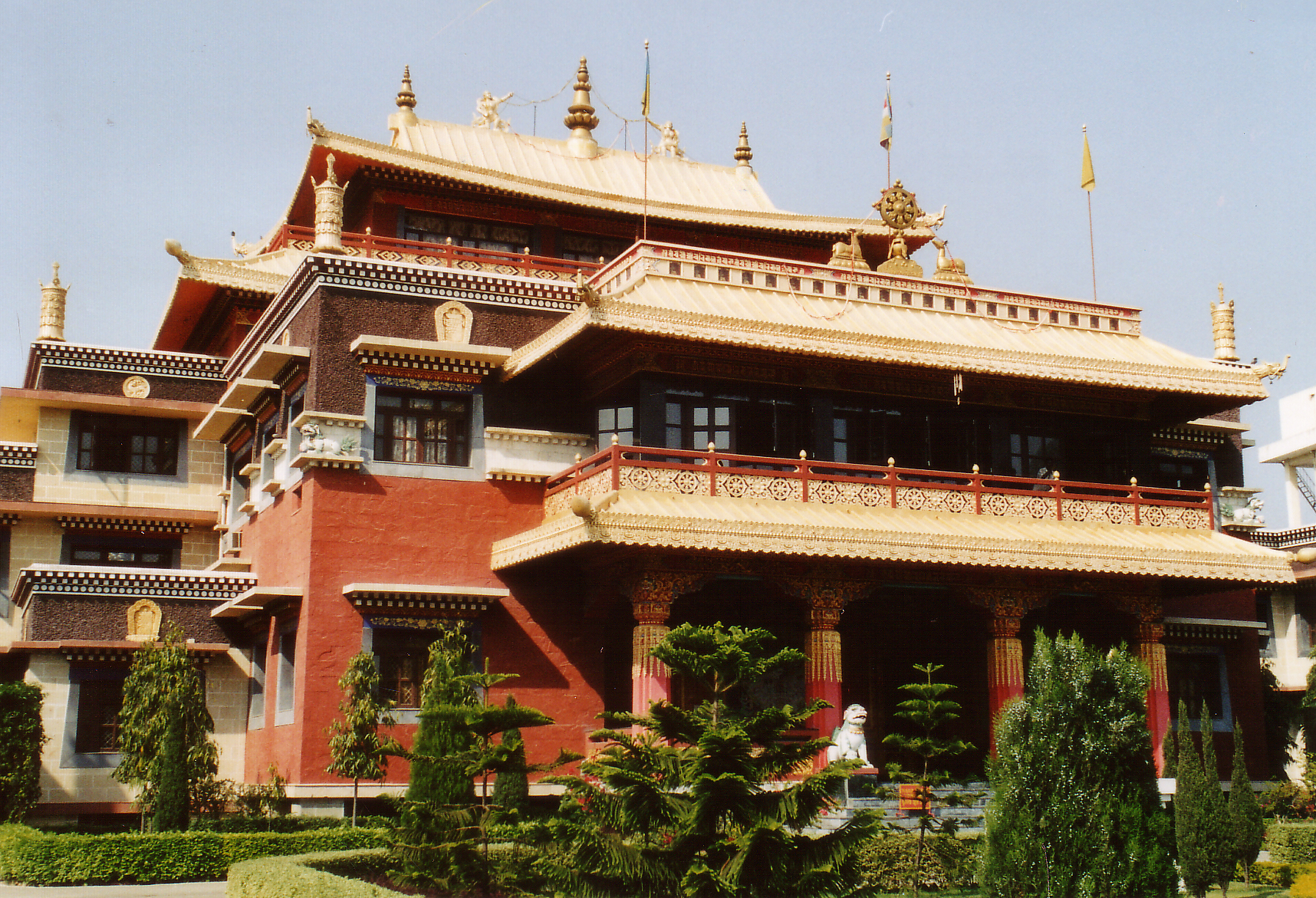
Temple and monastery of the Tibetan community in Sarnath

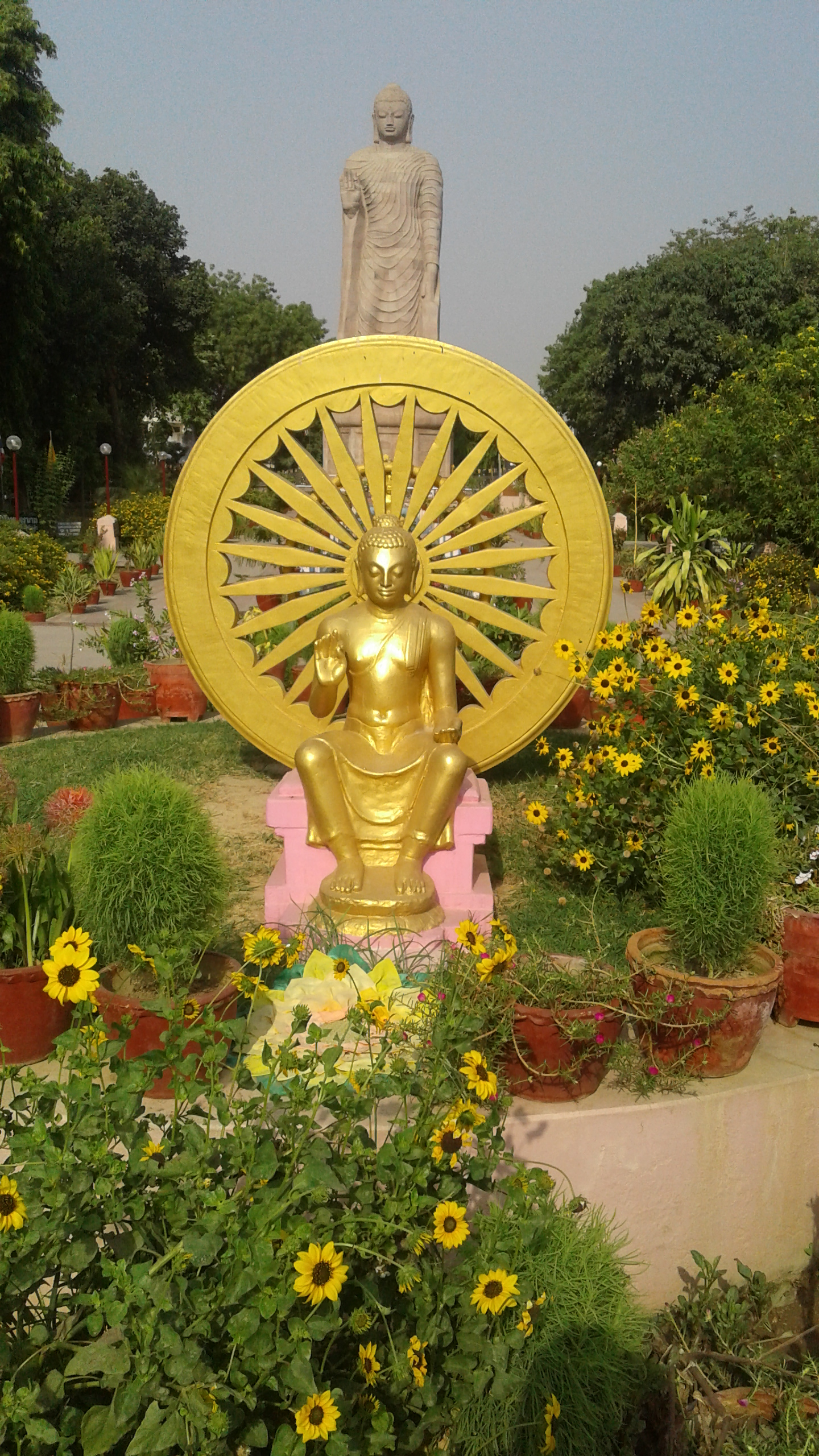
Seated statue of the Buddha, with standing Buddha statue in the background, on the grounds of the Thai temple and monastery at Sarnath

== Cited works ==
- Asher, Frederick M. (2020). Sarnath: A Critical History of the Place Where Buddhism Began. Los Angeles: Getty Research Institute. ISBN 978-1-60606-616-4.
- Auer, Blain; Strauch, Ingo (19 August 2019). Encountering Buddhism and Islam in Premodern Central and South Asia. Walter de Gruyter GmbH & Co KG. ISBN 978-3-11-062986-6.
- Chandra, Satish (2007). History of Medieval India: 800-1700 (PDF). Hyderabad: Orient BlackSwan. ISBN 978-93-5287-457-6.
- Cunningham, Alexander (1871). "Banaras Sarnath". Four reports made during the years 1862-63-64-65. Vol. 1. Shimla, Himachal Pradesh, India: Archaeological Survey of India. pp. 103–130.
- Duncan, Johnathan (1799). "An Account of the Discovery of Two Urns in the Vicinity of Benares". Transactions of the Society Instituted in Bengal, for enquiring into the History and Antiquities, the Arts, Sciences and Literature, of Asia. 5: 131–3.
- Elliott, Mark; Diemberger, Hildegard; Clemente, Michela (2014). Buddha's Word: The Life of Books in Tibet and Beyond (PDF). Cambridge, England: Museum of Archaeology and Anthropology, University of Cambridge. ISBN 978-0-947595-20-3.
- Federation of Jain Associations in North America (2021). Compendium of Jainism (PDF) (4th ed.). Carson, California: Jain Education International. ISBN 978-1-59406-066-3.
- Habib, Mohammad (1981). Nizami, Khaliq Ahmad (ed.). Politics and Society During the Early Medieval Period: Collected Works of Professor Mohammad Habib. Vol. 2. New Delhi: People's Publishing House.
- Hodges, William (1794). "Chaper IV: Description of Benares". Travels in India, during the years 1780, 1781, 1782, and 1783. London: printed for the author, and sold by J. Edwards.
- Khan, Iqtidar Alam (2008). Historical Dictionary of Medieval India. Historical Dictionaries of Ancient Civilizations and Historical Eras. Vol. 20. Lanham, Maryland: Scarecrow Press. ISBN 978-0-8108-5503-8.
- Kipling, Rudyard (1902). Kim (1st ed.). London: MacMillan & Company.
- Konow, Sten (1908). "Sarnath Inscription of Kumaradevi". Epigraphica Indica. 9 (51): 319–28.
- Landon, Letitia Elizabeth (1832). Fisher's drawing room scrap-book; with poetical illustrations by L.E.L, 1833. London: Fisher, Son, and Jackson.
- Li, Hwui (1914). The Life of Hiuen-Tsiang. Vol. Book III. Translated by Beal, Samuel (2nd ed.). London: Kegan Paul, Trench, Trübner & Company.
- Lovecraft, Howard Phillips (2011). The Complete Works of H. P. Lovecraft.
- Mani, B. R. (2012). Sarnath: Archaeology, Art and Architecture. New Delhi: Archaeological Survey of India.
- Meston, James (1915). "India". Hutchinson's Story of the Nations. London: Hutchison & Co. pp. 123–222.
- Nakamura, Hajime (2001). Gotama Buddha: A Biography Based on the Most Reliable Texts. Vol. 1. Translated by Sekimori, Gaynor (1st ed.). Tokyo: Kosei Publishing Company. ISBN 978-4-333-01893-2.
- Niyogi, Roma (1959). The History of the Gāhadavāla Dynasty. Kolkata: Calcutta Oriental Book Agency.
- Nosu, Kosetsu (1939). Life of Buddha in Frescoes: Mulagandhakuti Vihara, Sarnath. Kolkata: Maha Bodhi Society.
- Oertel, Friedrich Oscar (1908). "Excavations at Sarnath". Archaeological Survey of India Annual Report, 1904–1905. Calcutta: Superintendent Government Printing, India. pp. 59–104.
- Phuoc, Le Huu (2010). Buddhist Architecture. Lakeville, Minnesota: Grafikol. ISBN 978-0-9844043-0-8.
- Ray, Himanshu Prabha (2014). The Return of the Buddha: Ancient Symbols for a New Nation (1st ed.). New Delhi: Routledge. ISBN 978-0-415-71115-9.
- Sadan, Jha (2016). Reverence, Resistance and Politics of Seeing the Indian National Flag. Cambridge, England: Cambridge University Press. ISBN 978-1-107-11887-4.
- Sahni, Daya Ram (1914). Catalogue of the Museum of Archaeology at Sarnath (PDF). Calcutta: Superintendent Government Printing, India.
- Sahni, Daya Ram (1917). Guide to the Buddhist ruins of Sarnath. Calcutta: Archaeological Survey of India.
- Sanyal, Sanjeev (2012). Land of the Seven Rivers: A Brief History of India's Geography. Gurgaon, India: Penguin Books India Private Limited. pp. 130–1. ISBN 978-81-8475-671-5.
- Sarao, Karam Tej Singh (2017). "Isipatana". In Long, Jeffery D. (ed.). Buddhism and Jainism. Encyclopedia of Indian Religions. Dordrecht, Netherlands: Springer. p. 581. doi:10.1007/978-94-024-0852-2_100384. ISBN 978-94-024-0851-5.
- Schumann, Hans Wolfgang (2004). The Historical Buddha: The Times, Life, and Teachings of the Founder of Buddhism. New Delhi: Motilal Banarsidass. ISBN 81-208-1817-2.
- Sherring, Matthew Atmore (1868). Benares: The Sacred City of the Hindus. Delhi: B. R. Publishing Corporation.
- Smith, Vincent Arthur (1911). A history of fine art in India and Ceylon, from the earliest times to the present day. Oxford: Clarendon Press.
- Tillotson, Giles Henry Rupert (2000). The Artificial Empire: The Indian Landscapes of William Hodges (1st ed.). Abingdon-on-Thames, England: Routledge. ASIN B00AZ4O282.
- Tricycle (2 November 2009). "It's not quite Bamiyan but..." Tricycle: The Buddhist Review. 19 (1).
- Verardi, Giovanni (2011). Hardships and Downfall of Buddhism in India. Manohar Publishers & Distributors. ISBN 978-81-7304-928-6.
- Vogel, Jean Philippe (1906). "Epigraphical Discoveries at Sarnath". Epigraphica Indica. 8 (17): 166–179.
- Wagner, Anne (2021). Marusek, Sarah (ed.). Flags, Color, and the Legal Narrative: Public Memory, Identity, and Critique. Cham, Switzerland: Springer Nature. ISBN 978-3-030-32864-1.
