= Chaukhandi Stupa =

Buddhist stupa in Varanasi, Uttar Pradesh, India

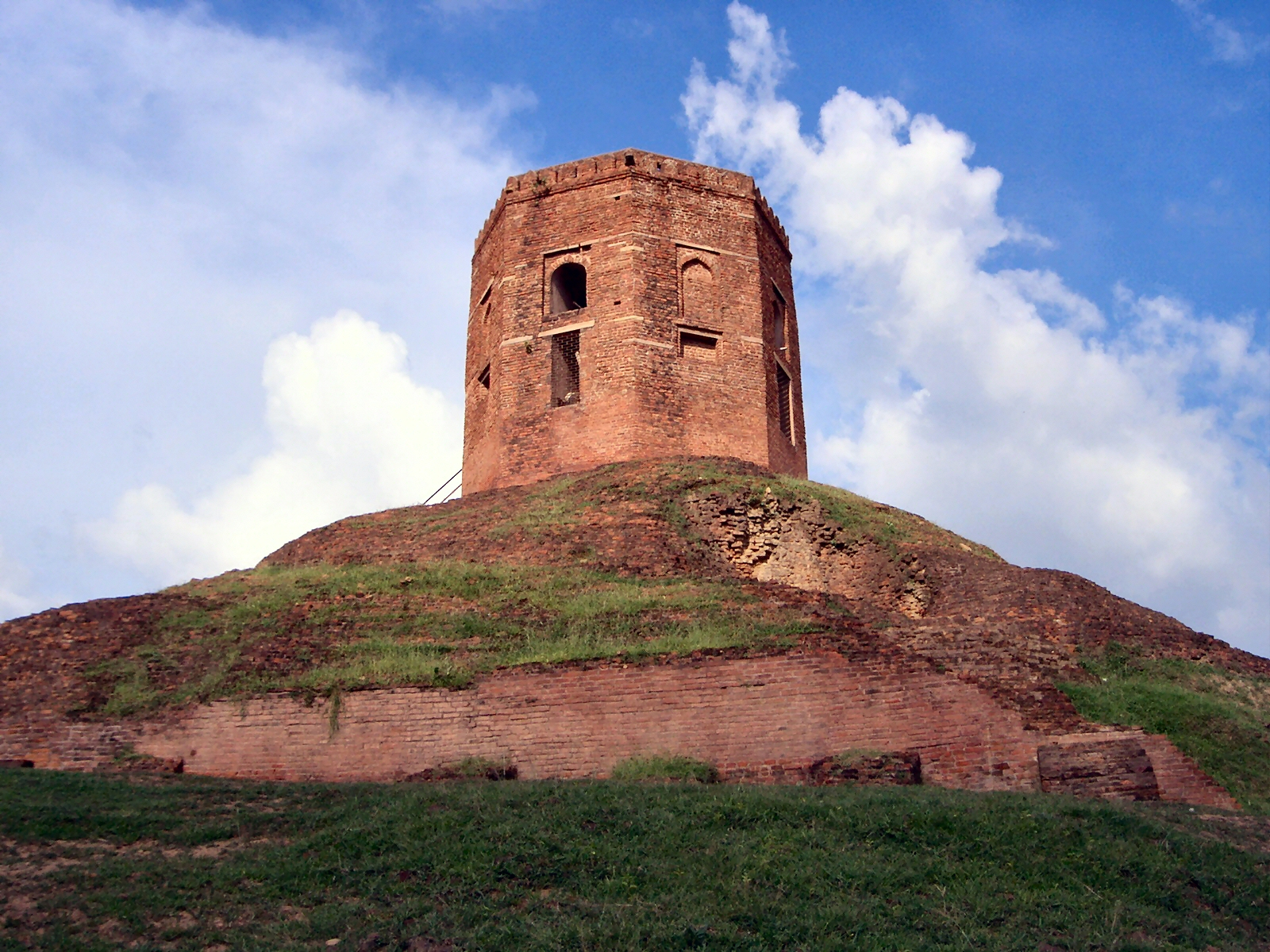
- Chaukhandi Stupa

- Location within India

Religion
- Affiliation: Buddhism
- Status: Preserved

Location
- Location: (India) Sarnath, Varanasi, Uttar Pradesh
- State: Uttar Pradesh
- Coordinates: 25.374102°N 83.023658°E

Chaukhandi Stupa is a Buddhist stupa in Sarnath located 8 kilometres from Cantt Railway Station in Varanasi, Uttar Pradesh, India. The site was declared to be a monument of national importance by the Archaeological Survey of India in June 2019.

== History ==
The Chaukhandi Stupa is thought originally to have been built as a terraced temple during the 7th and 8th centuries to mark the site where Buddha and his first disciples met traveling from Bodh Gaya to Sarnath. Later Govardhan, the son of a Raja Todar Mal, modified the stupa to its present shape by building the octagonal tower to commemorate the visit of Humayun, the Mughal ruler.

Today the stupa is a high earthen mound covered with a brickwork edifice topped by an octagonal tower. It is maintained by the Archaeological Survey of India.

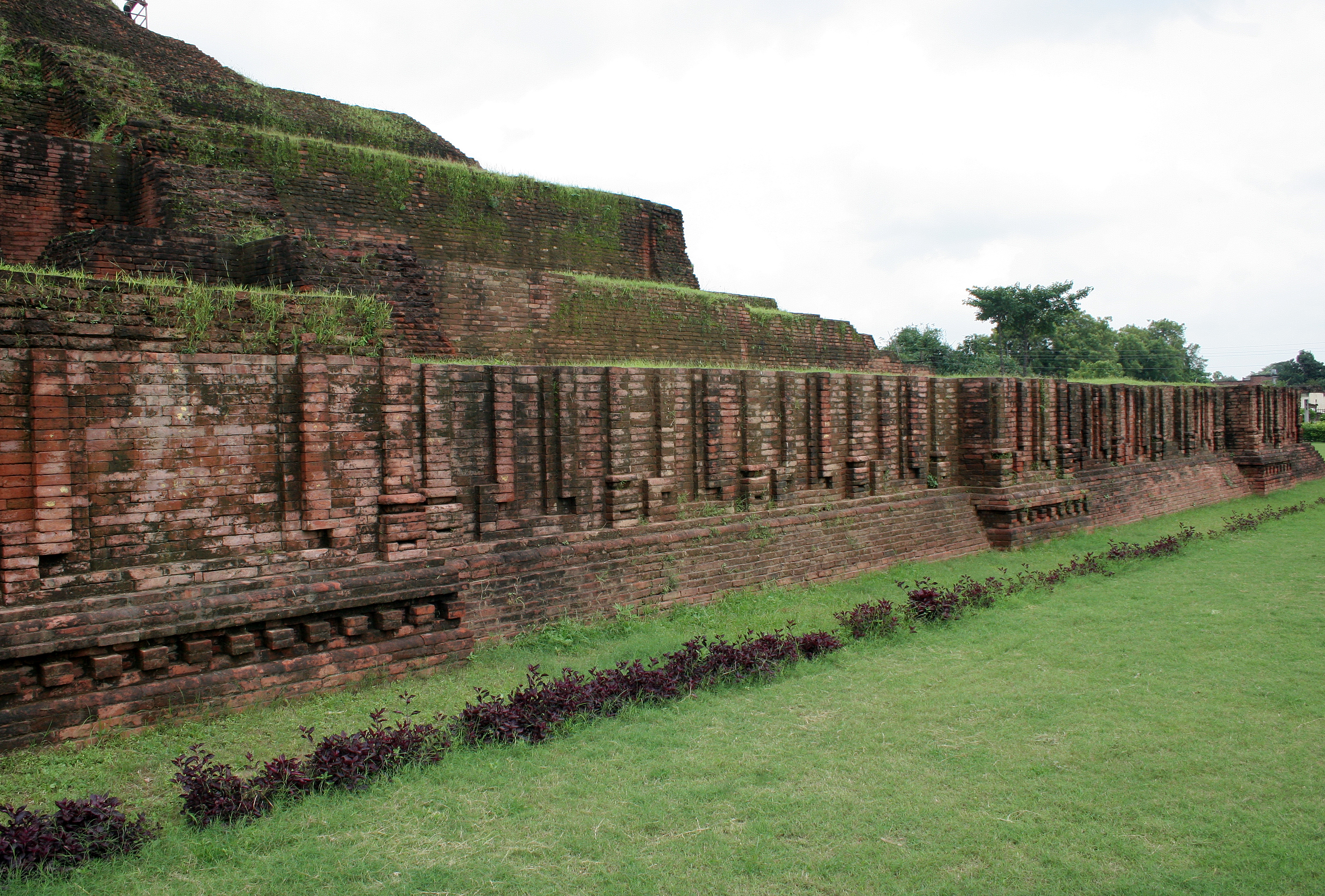
Various plinths at the Chaukhandi Stupa

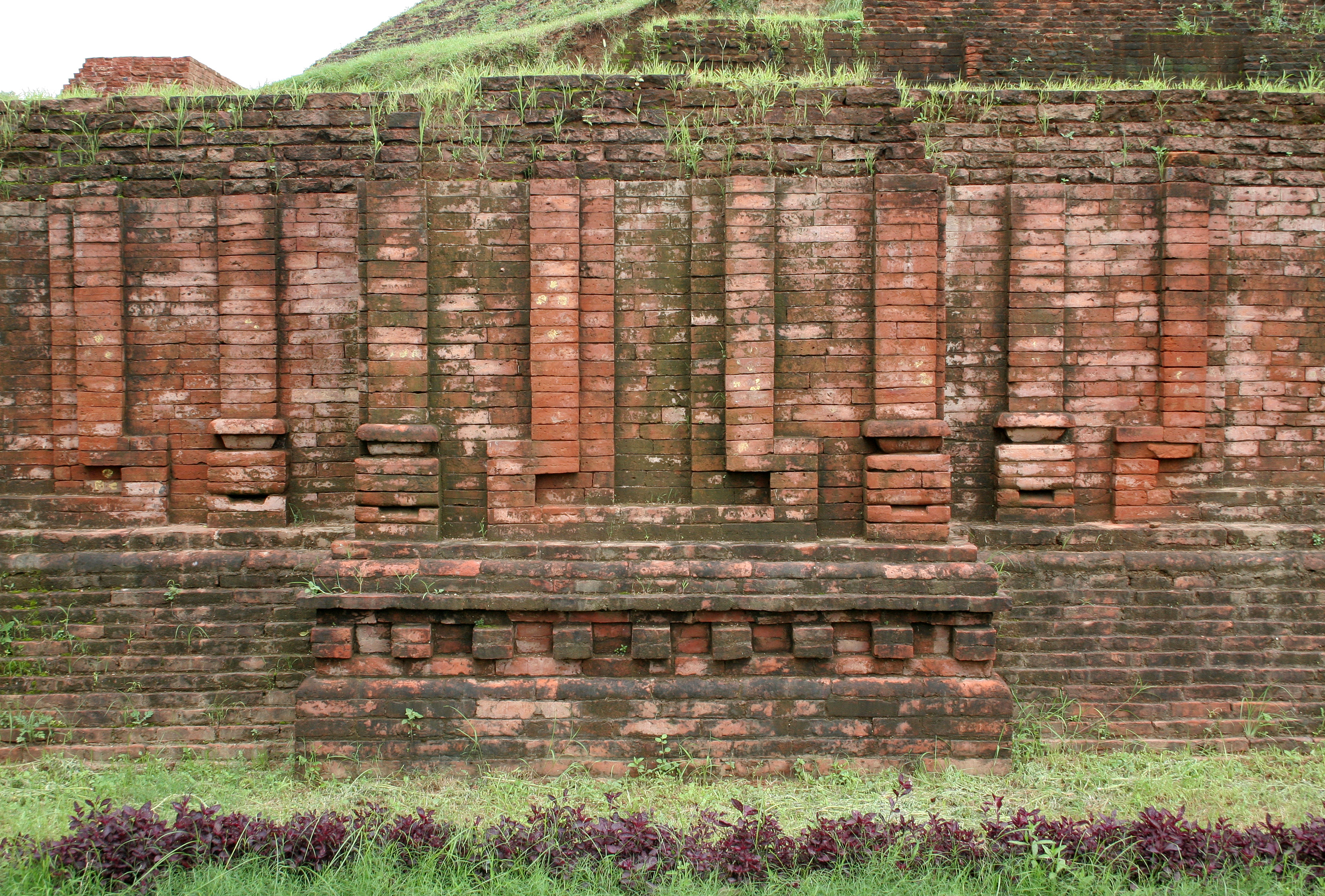
Close up of Chaukhandi Stupa plinth

== See also ==
- Dhamek Stupa
- Sarnath
- List of Buddhist temples
