= J. Ph. Vogel =

Dutch epigraphist and Sankritist (1871–1958)

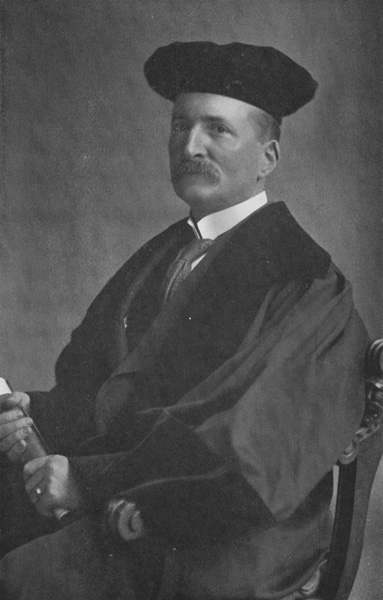
- Vogel, c. 1914
- Born: January 9, 1871; The Hague, Netherlands
- Died: April 10, 1958 (aged 87); Oegstgeest, Netherlands
- Known for: Work on the Sanskrit language
- Scientific career
- Fields: Indology, philology, translation, archaeology
- Institutions: University of Leiden

Jean Philippe Vogel (9 January 1871 in The Hague – 10 April 1958 in Oegstgeest), popularly known by his initials J. Ph. Vogel, was a Dutch Sanskritist and epigraphist who worked with the Archaeological Survey of India from 1901 to 1914 and later, as Professor in the University of Leiden.

== In the ASI ==
Vogel worked as Superintendent of the Punjab, Baluchistan, and Ajmer based at Lahore from January 1901 to 1914. Between 1910 and 1911, he even deputised as Director General of ASI in the absence of John Marshall. As archaeologist, Vogel participated in excavations in Gandhara, the Punjab Hill States, Kusinagara and Mathura.

== Other works ==
- In the early twentieth century, Vogel helped establish the Bhuri Singh Museum in the Chamba state.
- Along with John Hutchison, Vogel authored the two-volume History of the Punjab Hill States (1933). Earlier, these two had also co-authored History of the Jammu State (1921).
