= Himanshu Prabha Ray =

Indian historian and archaeologist

Himanshu Prabha Ray (born 15 August 1947) is an Indian Sanskrit scholar and historian. Her interests areas are marine archaeology, history, and culture of South Asia. Ray is a recipient of the Anneliese Maier research award of the Humboldt Foundation for collaborative research with the Distant Worlds Programme and an Honorary Professor of the Distant Worlds Programme, LMU Munich in Germany. She has also served as a professor in the Centre for Historical Studies at Jawaharlal Nehru University in New Delhi, India. Ray was appointed as the Chairperson of the National Monuments Authority, under the government of India, until 2015.

With her interdisciplinary approach, she has authored many books and research papers on history, world heritage, and archaeology and is a recipient of many awards from research institutions.

Ray notes, most of the historians focus on political dynasties of medieval South Asia and have neglected the history of the sea. In her recent project focusing on Indian coastal belt from Goa to Mangalore wherein, she intends to study the history of the sea through the historical monuments dated back to European time. Ray recommends that coastal history can not be isolated as only the history of India, instead, it has to be a study of the area covering the entire Indian Ocean region. To preserve the degrading coastal heritage, she comments "we need to draw on rigorous research and blend history, archaeology, and heritage, especially world heritage".

== Works ==
Among many books authored by Himanshu Prabha Ray, the following are some of her works:

- The Archaeology of Seafaring in Ancient South Asia
- Archaeology and Buddhism in South Asia
- Archaeology As History In Early South Asia
- Monastery and guild: commerce under the Sātavāhanas
- The Return of the Buddha: Ancient Symbols for a New Nation
- Early Seafaring Communities of the Indian Ocean
- Monuments
