= Manda, Jammu =

Village near Jammu in India

Manda
- Location in Jammu and Kashmir, India Manda, Jammu (India)
- 32°56′00″N 74°48′00″E
- Type: Settlement
- Periods: 2350-1750 BC (Indus Valley Civilisation) (Mauryan Empire) 78-200 C.E (Kushan Empire)
- Location: Manda, Jammu, J&K, India
- Region: India
- Part of: Indus Valley Civilisation, Mauryan Empire and Kushan Empire

History
- Built: 400BC
- Abandoned: 300A.D

Site notes
- Excavation dates: 1976-77
- Archaeologists: J. P. Joshi
- Condition: Abandoned

Manda is a village and an archaeological site in the Jammu district of the Union Territory of Jammu and Kashmir, India, a region disputed between India and Pakistan. It was excavated by Archaeological Survey of India during 1976-77 by J. P. Joshi. The site contains ruins of an ancient Indus Valley Civilisation.

== Excavation ==
Excavation at Manda revealed a 9.20 m deposit with threefold sequence with two sub periods in Period I. Period II has early historical pottery of types comparable with those of same period from Northern part of India and period III is represented by Kushan antiquities and house walls with 3 m wide street. After the Kushan period, the site seems to have been deserted.

== Historical significance ==
Manda is situated on the right bank of Chenab River in the foothills of Pir Panjal range, 28 km northwest of Jammu, and was considered the northernmost limit of the Harappan civilisation. It is considered the northmost site (excluding Shortugai) of Indus Valley Civilisation.

It is considered a site established to procure wood from Himalayan Sub hills and send it downriver to other towns of the Indus Valley Civilisation.

== Artefacts ==
Pre Harappan Red ware (15%-25%) Harappan Red ware, including jars, dishes, dishes-on-stand, beakers, goblets etc. and copper double spiral headed spin (having west Asian affinity), tangled bone arrow-heads, terracotta bangles, cakes, chert blade etc.

Significant finds include potsherds bearing incised Harappan Script and one unfinished seal.

== Further scope ==
Due to the restricted nature of the dig undertaken, no specific structures could be exposed, except a collapsed rubble wall-like structure.

== See also ==
- Indus Valley Civilisation
- List of Indus Valley Civilisation sites
- Sutkagan Dor
- Alamgirpur
- Daimabad
