= 25th century BC =

One hundred years, from 2500 BC to 2401 BC

The 25th century BC comprises the years from 2500 BC to 2401 BC.

== Events ==
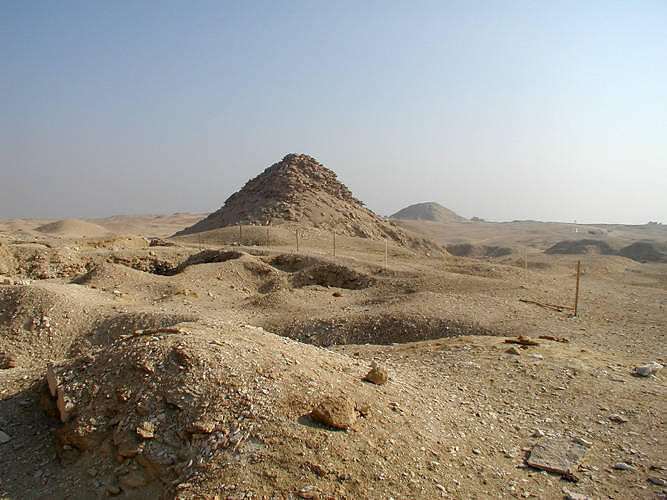
The ruined pyramid of Userkaf at Saqqara. He was the founder of the Fifth Dynasty of Egypt

- c. 2900–2334 BC: Mesopotamian wars of the Early Dynastic period.
- c. 2500 BC: Rice was first introduced to what is now modern-day Malaysia
- c. 2500 BC: N1c Y-DNA first found from Europe from Serteya II (located in modern day Smolensk Oblast in Russia).
- c. 2500 BC: Scribal schools flourish throughout Sumer.
- c. 2500 BC: Assyria is established.
- c. 2500 BC: Cylinder seal from Sumer and its impression are made. It is now in the Metropolitan Museum of Art, New York.
- c. 2500 BC: Excavation and development of the Hypogeum of Ħal-Saflieni at Paola, Malta, a subterranean temple complex subsequently used as a necropolis.
- c. 2500 BC: The Pyramid of Khafre, Giza, is built.
- c. 2500 BC: The sculpture Khafre Enthroned is made.
- c. 2500 BC: People in what is now Peru rely on fish and mussels for food.
- c. 2500 BC: Evidence of long-distance trade routes in South America.
- c. 2500 BC: Skara Brae is abandoned after approximately 600 years of occupation.
- c. 2500–2250 BC: Ebla tablets are collected in the ancient city of Ebla, Syria. Discovered by Italian archaeologist Paolo Matthiae and his team in 1974–75, is considered to be the first, if not the oldest, inactive library being the St. Catherine's Monastery Library (565) the oldest active one.
- c. 2500–2000 BC: Mohenjo-daro is about 7 square miles (18 km^{2}) in size and has a population of c. 20,000 to 50,000.
- c. 2494–2345 BC: "Sculptors at work", relief from Saqqara, Fifth Dynasty. It is now at Egyptian Museum, Cairo, Egypt.
- c. 2494–2345 BC: The Seated Scribe, a sculpture found at Saqqara, Fifth Dynasty of Egypt is made. It is now in Musée du Louvre, Paris.
- 2492 BC: Traditional date for the legendary foundation of Armenia by Hayk.
- c. 2450 BC: End of the Early Dynastic IIIa Period and beginning of the Early Dynastic IIIb Period in Sumer.
- c. 2450 BC: Kish is lost to Hamazi tribesmen of the Kurdistan mountains; Elam under the Awan dynasty occupies parts of Sumer. (Roux 1980)
- c. 2410 BC: By this time, kings in Sumer have ceased to be automatically high priests of the city deity. (Roux 1980) Infiltration and conquest of Mesopotamia by ancient Semitic-speaking peoples begins. (1968 RD Almanac)
- c. 2400–2200 BC: Construction of Stonehenge
- Megalithic culture begins to spread through Europe and the western Mediterranean. (1968 RD Almanac)
- Earliest signs of Corded Ware culture from the Caucasus. (Encyc. Americana)
- The southeastern Iberian Peninsula is settled from the Mediterranean, by people using Prehistoric Egyptian-style pottery. (Encyc. Americana)
- Amorites and Canaanites occupy the region of Syria. (Encyc. Americana)

== Inventions, discoveries, introductions ==
- The Indus Valley Civilisation, at its peak, covered an area of around 480,000 km^{2} (185,000 sq mi), an area just over half the size of present-day Pakistan. Its heartland lay in the Indus River in Pakistan, but settlements spread as far as the Makran coast, Balochistan, Afghanistan, eastern Punjab, Kutch and Saurashtra. They included cities like Harappa, Mohenjo-daro, Kalibangan, Dholavira, ports like Lothal, Sutkagen-dor and Sokhta Koh and numerous villages as well. They used irrigation to farm and constructed cities. The two main cities had sewage systems, bronze, trade tokens (early coins), and hieroglyphs. There were even baths at one of the villages, besides the great baths of brick in each city.
- Sahure is the earliest known king to make use of a high-seas navy to transport troops over the sea.
- The earliest known example of a sewn boat is constructed in Egypt.
- Cycladic marble figures depict the use of both the musical pipe and the cithara. (Archaeology of the Olympics 1988)
- Earliest surviving ski is left in a bog at what is now Hoting, Sweden, about this time. (Encyc. Americana)
- Sumerians use domestic donkeys on war chariots (Standard of Ur), not onagers as early interpreters claimed. (Clutton-Brock)
- Agriculture at Huaca Prieta includes cotton and calabashes. (Bailey 1973)
- Statue of Ebih-Il, at Mari
