= Harappan architecture =

Bronze Age Indus Valley architecture

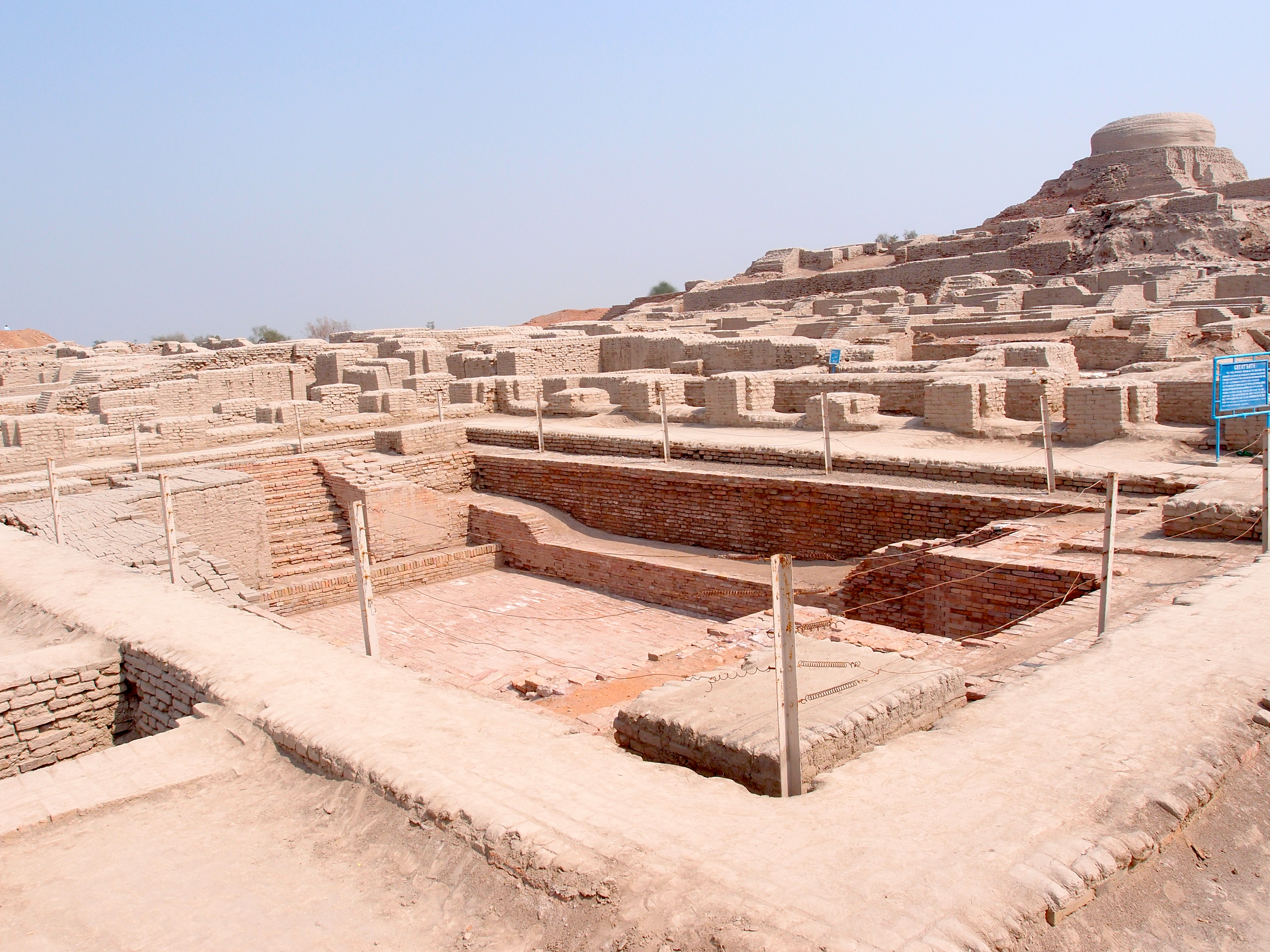
The Great Bath of Mohenjo-daro (Pakistan)

Harappan architecture is the architecture of the Bronze Age Indus Valley civilization, an ancient society of people who lived during c. 3300 BCE to 1300 BCE in the Indus Valley of modern-day Pakistan and India.

The civilization's cities were noted for their urban planning, baked brick houses, elaborate drainage systems, water supply systems, clusters of large non-residential buildings, and new techniques in handicraft (carnelian products, seal carving) and metallurgy (copper, bronze, lead, and tin). Its large urban centres of Mohenjo-daro and Harappa very likely grew to containing between 30,000 and 60,000 individuals, (Note: Dyson: "Mohenjo-daro and Harappa may each have contained between 30,000 and 60,000 people (perhaps more in the former case). Water transport was crucial for the provisioning of these and other cities. That said, the vast majority of people lived in rural areas. At the height of the Indus valley civilization the subcontinent may have contained 4-6 million people.") and the civilisation itself during its height may have contained between one and five million individuals. (Note: McIntosh: "The enormous potential of the greater Indus region offered scope for huge population increase; by the end of the Mature Harappan period, the Harappans are estimated to have numbered somewhere between 1 and 5 million, probably well below the region's carrying capacity.")

Harappan culture was heavily influenced through its integration into international trade and contact due to its location along the Indus River. Signs of urbanization in the Indus Valley began as early as 6000 BCE, in the Neolithic, and many towns and cities had been established by 3200 BCE, in the Early Harappan phase. The architectural transition between Early and Mature Harappan phases took place in the sites of Amri, Nausharo, Ghazi Shah, and Banawali. By 2500 BCE, in the Mature Harappan phase, the civilization had become the eastern anchor of a network of trade routes including the Mesopotamian city-states, the Gulf, Iranian Plateau, and Central Asia.

Through its urbanization, the Harappan Civilization brought together many kinds of people from different ethnic and linguistic groups into a socio-cultural whole, in turn affecting its architecture and town planning.

== Overview ==
=== Elements of Harappan architecture ===
Art of the Indus Valley civilization architecture was indigenous and without any influence. Sculpture had no integral role in architecture; they were found separately. There was a concentration of utility factor rather than aesthetic factor presumably because they were primarily traders. Harappan architecture of the Indus civilization focused on functional expression rather than pure decoration. Evidence shows that the Indus culture lacked magnificent buildings such as palaces, monuments, discrepancies, and tombs, on the contrary, most buildings were large-scale public buildings, commodious houses, or practical residences, which proved to be the first complex ancient society based on egalitarianism.

==== Planning ====
A notable feature of Harappan architecture is that of a developed infrastructural city plan, in that they had sophisticated systems to control the flow of water and waste with public wells and drains that may have required advanced planning to implement. The cities were divided into rectilinear grids divided by roads which intersected at right angles, encircled by fortifications, with each block containing a network of houses and public wells. Harappan cities featured urban and social elements such as roads, fire pits, kilns, and industrial buildings, and were primarily functional in purpose rather than aesthetic. The city sewerage, plumbing, and drainage systems were distributed in the network of the grid planning by early hydro-engineers to be functionally used and maintained. The Harappan civilization seems to also be capable of astrological observation and alignment, as some evidence exists that Mohenjo-daro was aligned with the star "Rohini".

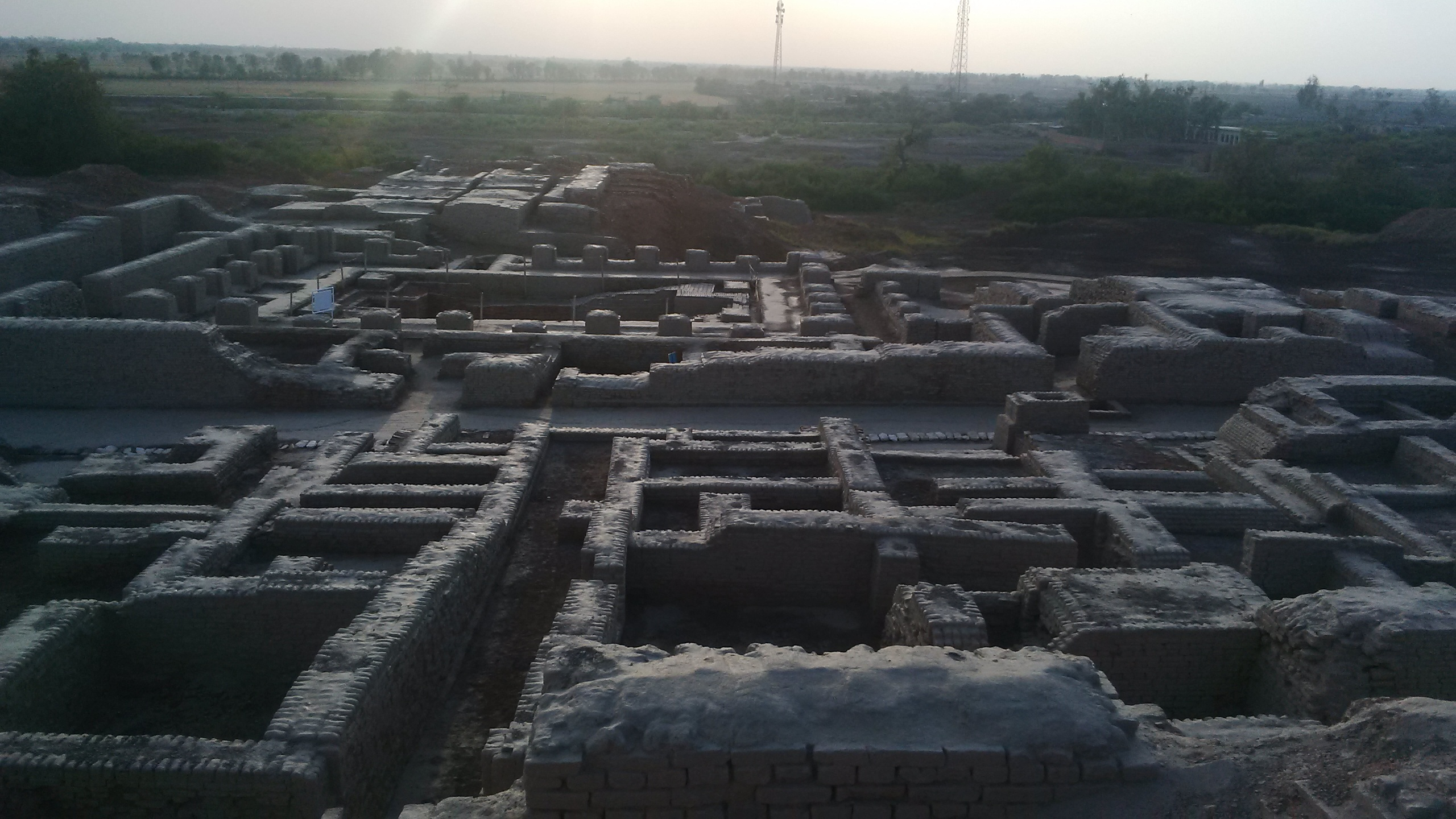
Regularity of streets and buildings suggests the influence of ancient urban planning in Mohenjo-daro's construction.

Mohenjo-daro had a planned layout with rectilinear buildings arranged on a grid plan. Most were built of fired and mortared brick; some incorporated sun-dried mud-brick and wooden superstructures.

Sites were often raised, or built on man made hills. This could be to combat flooding in the nearby areas. Another aspect of the architecture is they often built walls around their entire cities. This could have served several different needs. Many believe that the walls were built as defensive structures, where “Large and impressive construction works can be used to intimidate potential attackers (Trigger 1990)”. It was also an obvious feature to show the city was strong and powerful by being able to divert resources and labor to make such a large structure and not focus all of their energy on survival. This was not the only purpose for the wall, it is thought that the wall also served as protection from floods. There is also evidence of a tapering at the bottom of the wall to guide the water away from the city.

The city could be split into two different sections: an upper "acropolis" or citadel and a "lower town". The lower town consisted of lower valued residential buildings located on the eastern side of the city, while the upper acropolis would be on the western side of the city which contained the higher value buildings and public buildings. The acropolis was a “parallelogram that was 400–500 yards north-south and 200–300 yards east-west” It was also thought that the acropolis area would be built on the highest part of the mound in the city showing the importance and status of the area was much higher than the rest of the area. Another feature which suggests the acropolis is of higher importance is that the fortifications around the area were bigger and stronger than those around the rest of the city.

==== Large structures ====
The Harappan civilization was capable of building large structures that demanded significant engineering knowledge.

Citadels were upper parts of the cities possibly reserved for an elite class of economically rich and politically powerful people. Roads were cut at right angles and thus usually formed rectangular shapes. Houses, assembly halls, and even multi-storey buildings were present. Buildings were constructed from stone, mud-brick and wood.

Public baths constructed of bricks were used for rituals and ceremonies. They were accompanied by various small rooms. Leakages and cracks are scarce.

Granaries were often found in citadels and enabled the inhabitants' prosperity. They were also found at Lothal dockyard to facilitate import and export of grain. The "Great Granary" in Mohenjo-daro is the largest and best known example, but its usage as an actual granary has been disputed by researchers.

Water management was highly developed by the Harappan civilization. Large scale water works, such as drainage systems, could be covered to cure blockages. Dams were also constructed that controlled water inlets.

Dockyards such as that at Lothal were built away from the main current to avoid deposition of silt. There was also a wooden lock gate system to avoid tidal flow.

Artificial lakes were cut out of stone to store water, as well as rain.

Corbelling was a technique used extensively by the Harappans to construct stone arches. There is evidence of the civilization building large vaulted culverts in Mohenjo-daro.

==== Water and sanitation technologies ====
The Harappa civilization revealed a complex mercantile society based on the well organized and comprehensive urban planning, which included sophisticated water management and sewerage systems to allow structures such as dams, wells, baths, and fountains. The plumbing and sewerage systems were formed by early hydro-engineers to allow water and sanitation within the city. These systems were effectively used and maintained by ancient Harappan residents.

Dams were hydro-structure built along the Indus River for water management purposes such as collecting, storing and diverting water.

Water cisterns and reservoirs were used in water storage systems including aqueducts and basins for the purpose of water distribution in agricultural practices, some of which took advantage of the terrain height differences to convey and store water.

Fountains were set up and connected by water channels to supply for households for purposes of drinking and bathing.

Drainage system and drains were built to make efficient disposal of water waste and residual solid in a sustainable way, which had inspection manholes at regular intervals to ensure efficient operation and proper management.

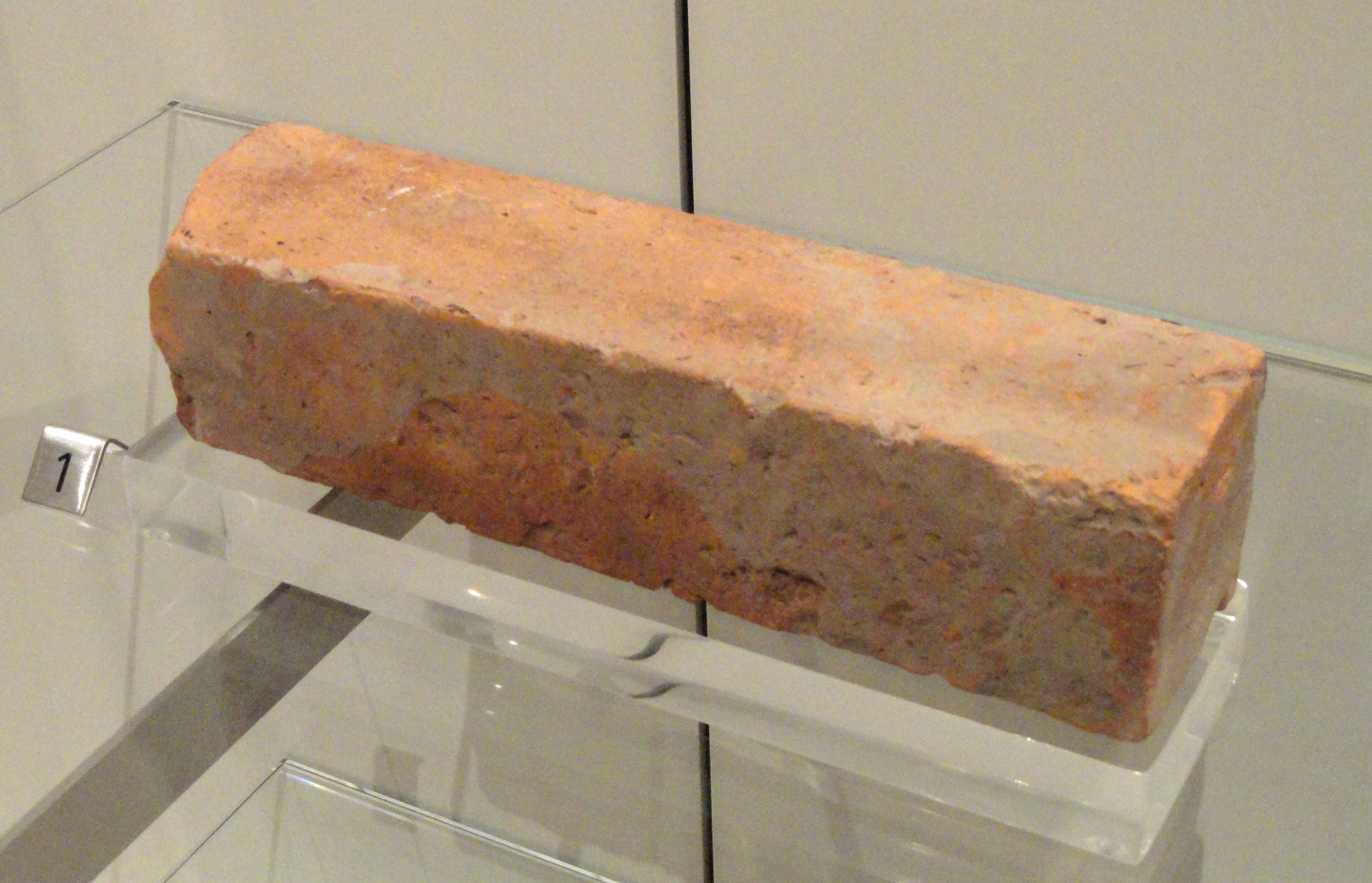
Cut brick from Chanhudaro (Pakistan); circa 2500-1900 BC; Royal Ontario Museum (Toronto, Canada)

=== Materials ===
The materials of houses depended on the location of the building. If the house was more rural the bricks would be mud. If the house was in an urban area then the bricks would be baked. The bricks were made in standardised ratios of 1x2x4. “Houses range from 1–2 stories in height, with a central courtyard around which the rooms were arranged”

== History ==
=== Early Harappan phase ===
The early Harappan phase, as defined by M.R. Mughal, spans roughly between 3200 and 2500 B.C.E. Between the two periods, the number of archeological sites dated to the Mature Harappan Phase was roughly over double to that of the Early Harappan, implying a significant urban growth during the Early Phase. There is not much evidence to show much urbanization, however; most Early Harappan structures were of a small scale and did not expand into public spaces or display a sense of social class. Early Harappan establishments settled in diverse landscapes, such as mountains and alluvium valleys (deposits of fertile soil).

=== Early to mature transition ===
There is evidence that the shift from the early to mature Harappan ages that point towards a gradual transition, with rapid development and geographical urban expansion. During this transition, a significant number of Harappan settlements were abandoned, perhaps due to shifting geography and climate.

=== Mature Harappan phase ===
The mature phase spans roughly between 2500 and 1900 B.C.E. and is much more reliably dated than the Early Phase. It is distinctive in its urban development, and was shaped by the behavior and activity of a sophisticated societal network. The structures reveal a hierarchy in social classes, and also evidence of extensive trading and farming.

== Harappan revival ==
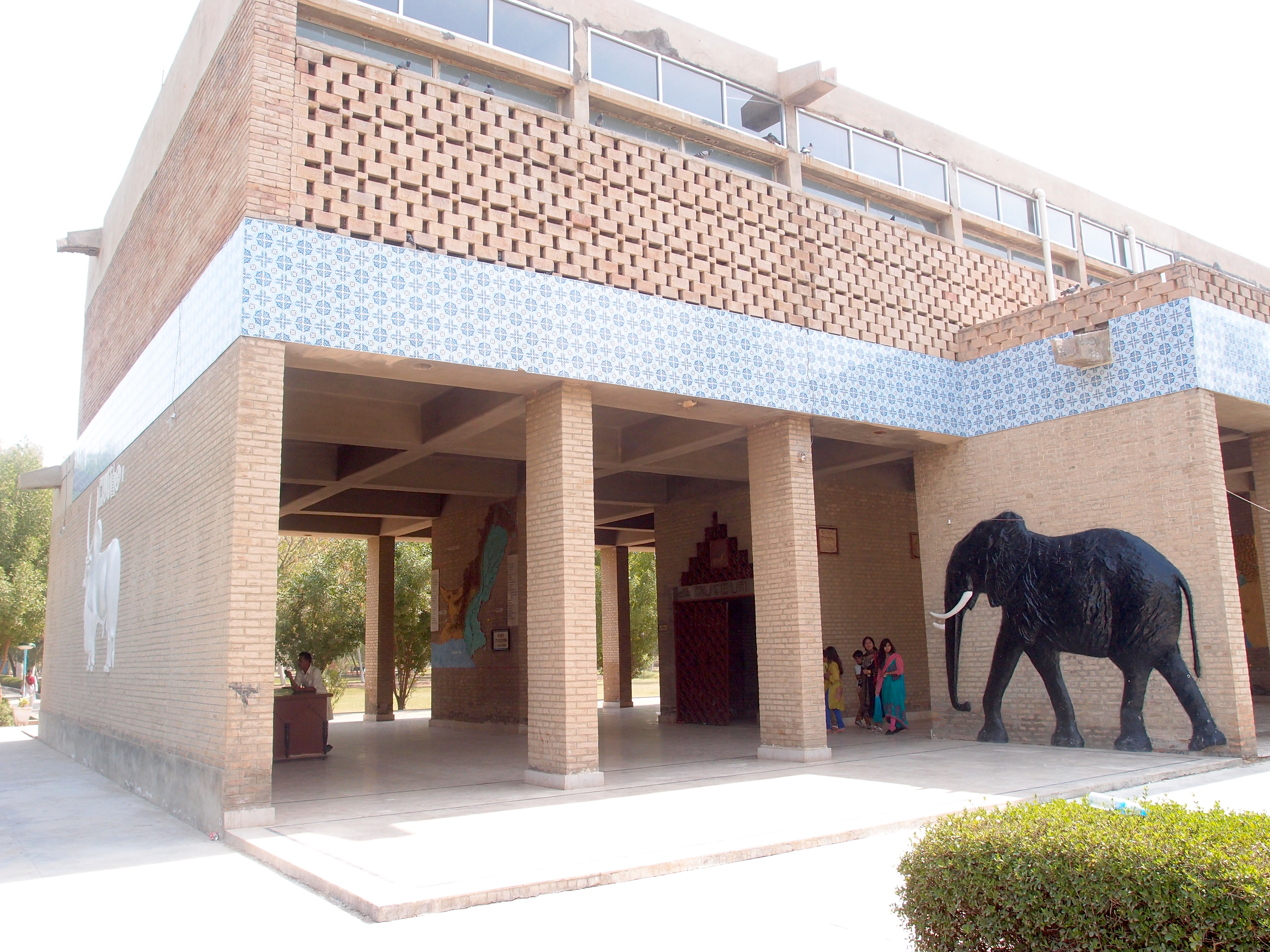
The Mohenjo-daro Museum, in Pakistan

There are few buildings built in the Harappan Revival style. The best well-known is the Mohenjo-daro Museum. It is made of bricks with a very similar color to the buildings from Mohenjo-daro or Harappa. One entrance has a geometric pattern made of bricks similar to those of the original gates.

== See also ==
- Lothal
- Dholavira
- Mehrgarh
- Sokhta Koh
- Sanitation of the Indus Valley Civilisation
