= Ganweriwal =

Archaeological site in Punjab, Pakistan

Ganweriwala
- گنویريوالا (Urdu)
- Location within Punjab, Pakistan Location within Pakistan Location within South Asia
- 28°35′56″N 71°9′0″E
- Type: Settlement
- Cultures: Indus Valley civilization
- Location: Bahawalpur District, Punjab, Pakistan
- Region: Cholistan Desert

History
- Built: c. 2500 BC

Site notes
- Area: 64.4 ha (159 acres)
- Archaeologists: Aurel Stein; Mohammed Rafique Mughal; Sidra Gulzar

Ganweriwal (Urdu: گنویريوالا Punjabi: گنیریوالا), more commonly known as Ganweriwala, is an archaeological site in the Cholistan Desert of southern Punjab, Pakistan. It was one of the largest cities within the Indus Valley civilisation, one of the most extensive Bronze Age civilizations, and is believed to have been a city centre within the civilization. The site was rediscovered in the 1970s by Mohammad Rafique Mughal but has not been properly excavated. Collection of surface finds and surveying of the site has shown mudbrick walls similar to those found in other Indus Valley sites, as well as unicorn figurines, a copper seal and an impressed clay tablet. The future of the site as well as any excavation work is threatened by the continuing development of the surrounding area for agricultural use as well as the construction of a road through the middle of the site.

== Location ==
Ganweriwala is situated near the Indian Border on the dry riverbed of the Ghaggar-Hakra, now part of the vast Cholistan desert. The size of the site is a contentious issue with four different sizes having been reported at different times.

The city is near equidistant from two major cities of the Indus Valley, 340 km northeast of Mohenjo-daro and 260 km southwest of Harappa.

In recent times the land surrounding the site is inhospitable to people but in the time of the Indus Valley Civilisation the area was fed by the Hakra River, making the area fertile and the citizens of the area were able to grow crops and to farm animals.

== Historical context ==
Ganweriwala was the 5th largest city within the Indus Valley Civilisation and is believed to have been a major centre from 2600 to 1900 BC. The Indus Valley Civilisation was a Bronze Age Civilisation which at its zenith had an estimated population of 5 million. Together with Mesopotamia and Ancient Egypt, it was one of the earliest complex civilisations, and of the three, was the most extensive. Ganweriwala was one of the largest cities within the Indus Valley Civilisation but is the least explored. Ganweriwala is believed to have followed the typical Indus Civilisation town planning. It had an Upper town and a Lower town as is seen in the presence of the two different mounds.

The civilisation was extraordinarily sophisticated for the time, with sewerage systems, counting systems, a well-developed means of communication, and much evidence of artistic activity. Artefacts have shown that the citizens of Ganweriwala took part in the production of crafts such as beads, pottery and figurines, and the production of industrial artefacts such as blades and clay tablets. A similar level of material culture was seen across the towns and cities in the Indus Valley. This indicates that extensive trade occurred within the region. Research has also shown that trade occurred between the Indus Valley and Mesopotamia. Archaeological evidence suggests that the Indus Valley Civilisation was primarily dependent on farming. Grains and garden vegetables were grown, and cattle husbandry was important to the farming economy of the region.

Though several inscriptions of the Harrappan language have been found, it remains undeciphered. Various researchers have claimed to be able to understand the script but no agreement across these various claims has yet been reached. The script consists of different symbols, iconography and code words which were written on clay tables, seals and pots. The modern language family of Dravidian may be the closest modern language to the script of the Indus Valley according to recent research. A regular measurement system was also used and standardised throughout the Civilisation, that has a 96% accuracy rate. The system follows the underlying principles of the binary and decimal systems.

It is not clear how the Indus Valley was organised politically, but it has been argued that it may not have been organised with a centralized leadership and economy as well as a social system based on a hierarchy, as was originally thought, and as has been seen in other early civilisations. Archaeological evidence shows that though there was some degree of homogeneity in the culture throughout the region there were large amounts of regional diversity, too. It has been hypothesised that the Indus Valley consisted of many city-states.

There are three distinct periods recognised in the history of the Indus Valley; Early Harappan, Harappan and post-Harappan. The Early Harappan refers to the period between 3300 and 2600 BCE throughout which the area had a diverse range of regional cultures. During this time there was large growth in the population of the region, which in turn saw growth in the size and number of settlements in the area. Evidence from archaeologists suggests that this time saw the beginning of social differentiation and craft specialisation.

The Harappan period was between 2600 and 1900 BCE and is characterised by an increase in the urban environment and major city centres. Settlement sizes increase and so too did the urban built environment. Standardised systems were adopted throughout the region and baked bricks were used for building. This period also saw relationships forming between neighbouring civilisations, and these new socio-economic and socio-cultural connections helped to create a more strongly connected urban society.

The post-Harappan period occurred around 1900 BCE and marked a period of vast changes in the economic, political and cultural state of the Indus Valley, as well as great changes to the environment. The main cities were abandoned in favour of settlements in the north-eastern part of present-day Pakistan. There is evidence that citizens stopped using cubical weights, square steatite seals and statues of the mother goddess during this time, possibly suggesting there was a lack of centralised control during this time.

The time and reason for the end of the Indus Valley Civilisation is unknown. It is suggested that changes to the climate and geography of the region may have caused the collapse. Tectonic movement may have caused the Indus River to flood, whilst the Ghaggar Hakra River is believed to have dried up. As these two rivers were the main source of water for the Indus Valley and supported their agricultural system, these changes may have led to its decline. Alternatively, some scholars have hypothesised that human interferences, perhaps an invasion or unsustainable population growth may have caused the collapse.

== Rediscovery and excavation ==
The Indus Valley was originally rediscovered in the Cholistan desert by Sir Aurel Stein in 1941. The area was again explored by Henry Field in 1955. Finally, Ganweriwala was discovered when Mohammad Rafique Mughal surveyed the area in the 1970s and rediscovered 174 Mature Harrapan sites along the Hakra riverbed. Ganweriwala was the most significant site due to its size. Mughal estimated it to be similar to that of Mohenjo-daro and Harrappa, the two capital cities of the Indus Valley Civilisation.

Ganweriwala was surveyed for the first time in 2007 when the Government of Pakistan's Department of Archaeology and Museums issued a license to Punjab University's Department of Archaeology. The survey began by establishing a systematic grid of the site in order to map Ganweriwala, and to aid future excavations of the site. The site is made up of two mounds, Mound A is located further east and Mound B, the larger of the two, is located in the west of the site. A main street acted as the central passage for transportation and movement of goods for both parts of the town. These features suggest that Ganweriwala follows the grid plan typical to the Indus Civilisation.

Whilst Mughal initially estimated that Ganweriwala covered 81.5 hectares measurements from the Punjab University team estimated the site to be only 42 hectares. It was hypothesised that the remaining 39 hectares that Mughal reported may have been covered by sand dunes, and that they could be uncovered with further excavation work. The Cholistan desert has changed dramatically over the past decades. However, both these measurements were based on traditional measuring techniques which are inaccurate. It is believed that this may explain the disparity in measurements. In 2008 Masih estimated the site to measure 64 ha, and finally a 2021 survey using more advanced measurement systems, created a contour map showing the Ganweriwala site to be 66.7 ha. Therefore the most recent estimate is considered the most accurate but excavation is needed to confirm the size.

Any future excavations of Ganweriwala face challenges as the area continues to be developed for agricultural use. The area is also subjected to military operations, private hunting parties and treasure hunters, which may damage the site. The survey by Punjab University noted that a 4-metre-wide road had been constructed through the middle of the Ganweriwala site for hunting parties from the UAE. Though this is unfortunate for the damage it may have caused the site it did provide ready-made sections across the upper sections of the mounds which allowed the team to examine the site further. Despite these issues, it is believed that the majority of the Ganweriwala site may have been preserved by the sand dunes under which it now exists.

No scientific excavations have been done on the site, but through surveying, mapping and collecting surface artefacts, several important finds have been made at Ganweriwala. A 90 cm wide mud-brick wall was found running south- north across Mound A. Carbon samples were able to date the upper levels of the site to around the Harappa Period 3C approximately 2300 to 1900 BC. The contours of the site are hypothesised to be house blocks with streets running between them. The layout is similar to other Harappan settlements, though proper scientific excavation methods are needed to confirm these hypotheses. Surface finds were collected and examined. They include ceramics both painted and plain, copper tools, stone tools, fired bricks, wedge shaped bricks, steatite disc beads, and agate beads. Notable finds include unicorn figurines, a copper seal, and an impressed clay tablet.

== Significant finds ==
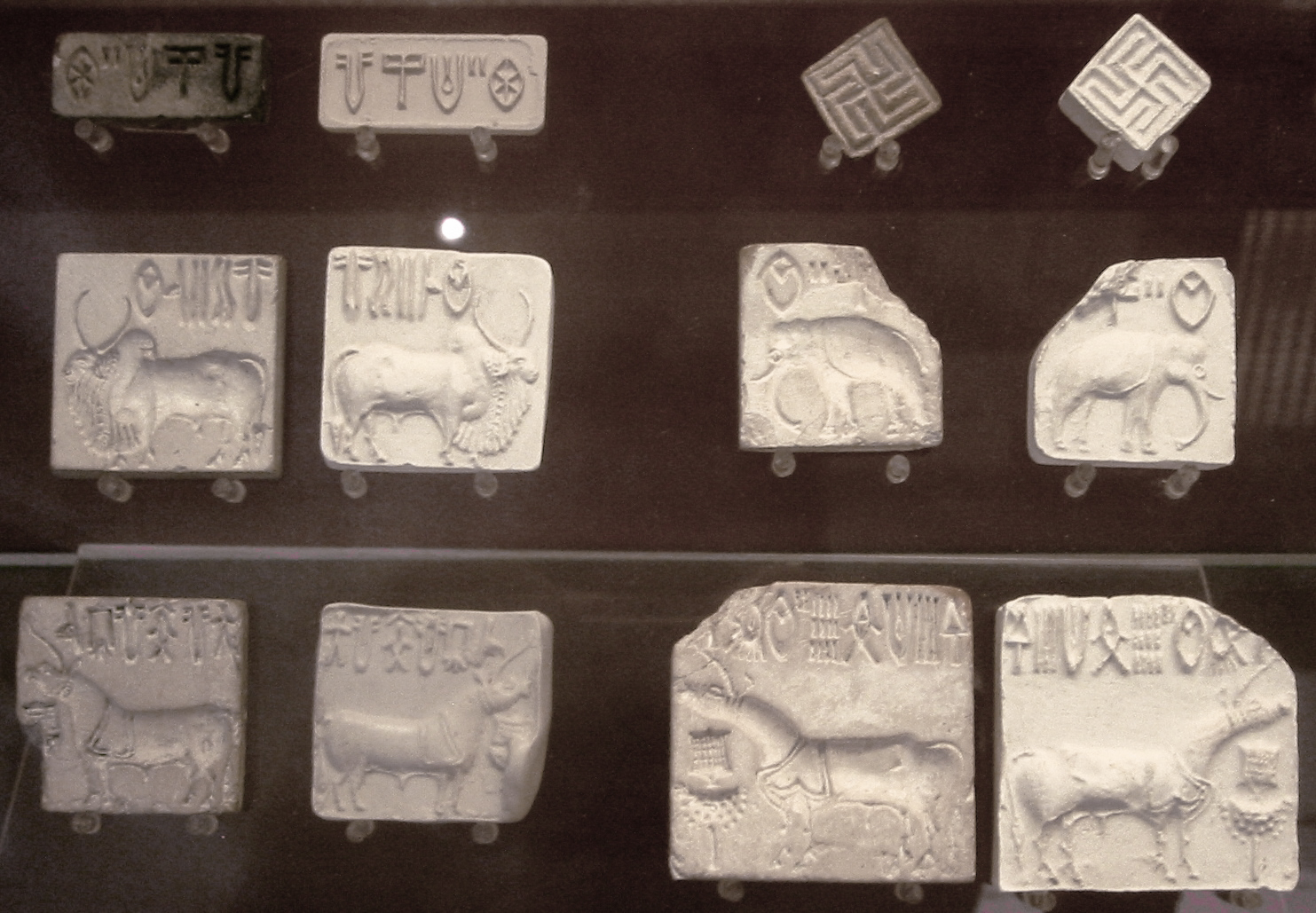
Examples of seals found in the Indus Valley

Collections of surface finds from Ganweriwala have been conducted several times from 1972 to 2015. The site is covered in millions of artefacts, which can be divided into four different types based on their function and features; these groups are bricks, mnemotechnic artefacts, adornments and toys, and utility artefacts. Different types of artefacts can usually be found in different parts of the Mounds at Ganweriwala, this may reflect the different socio-economic activities that occurred in the different parts of the city.

=== Impressed clay tablet ===
An impressed clay tablet was found on Mound A. It features a male deity, nude and seated in a yogi position with outstretched arms, on a throne with a disciple underneath him. The tablet measure 2 cm long and 1 cm wide. It is broken and twisted. There are three well known Indus script signs on the other face of the tablet.

=== Copper seal ===
A badly corroded copper seal was also found and is the first of its kind to be found in the area. No signs are recognisable due to the damage but an X-ray fluorescence analysis showed that the seal was composed of 99.89% pure copper.

=== Unicorn Figurines ===
Four terracotta unicorn figurines were found at Ganweriwala and though depictions of unicorns are frequently found across sites within the Indus Valley, it is rarer to find them in terracotta form. Though they have been found at three other cities, (Harappa, Mohenjo-daro and Chanhudaro) they had never been found in such a large quantity at one site.

=== Terracotta pieces ===
Three samples (GNW-1, GNW-2, GNW-3), collected by Sidra Gulzar, were analysed using SEM-EDX analysis to identify the primary elements present in the samples. The samples were fragments from a neck of a jar, a perforated pot and the base of a pot. The results showed that the samples contained high levels of carbon and silicon. Also, that the raw materials used to make the three samples came from a similar location. The differing levels of iron and calcium in GNW-1 and GNW-3 as compared to GNW-2 revealed that they were fired at different temperatures.

=== Bricks ===
Surveying of the Ganweriwala site found evidence of baked bricks. During the Harappan period of the Indus Valley, bricks that were used for constructing big cities were typically built in a ratio of 1:2:4. The bricks that were found at Ganweriwala also followed this standardized size. It has been hypothesized that a special mould might have been used in order to keep the size of the bricks uniform. The presence of baked bricks also indicates that the area had abundant raw materials with which to make the bricks as well as sufficient fuel to fire the bricks.

== See also ==
- List of Indus Valley Civilization sites
