= Harappa Museum =

Museum in Punjab, Pakistan

- عجائب گھر ہڑپہ
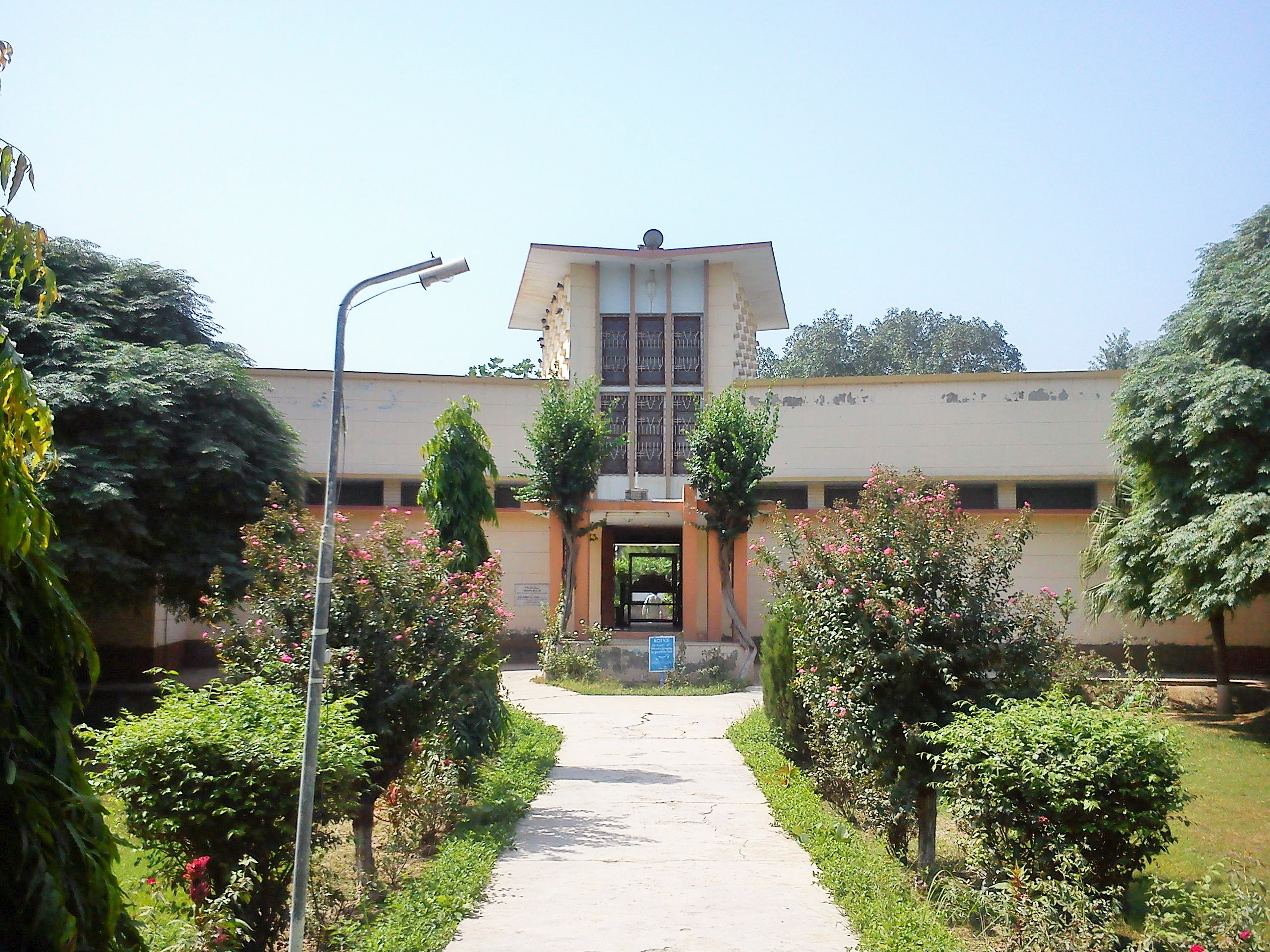
- Established: 1926; 100 years ago (established); 26 March 1967; 59 years ago (present building)
- Location: Chichawatni-Harappa Road, Harappa, Sahiwal District, Punjab, Pakistan
- Coordinates: 30°37′31″N 72°51′58″E
- Type: Archaeology museum

Harappa Museum is an archaeology museum based in Harappa, Punjab, Pakistan. It is located about 7 kilometers from Harappa railway station, and is 17 km (11 mi) west of Sahiwal.

Founded in 1926 as a small site museum, it shifted to its present building in 1967 which was constructed by the Government of Pakistan.

== History ==
=== The Indus Valley Civilization ===
The Indus Valley Civilisation was a Bronze Age civilization which lasted from 3300 BCE to 1300 BCE in regions now watered by the Indus River and its tributaries Jhelum, Chenab, Ravi, Sutlej, and Beas. More than four hundred of its sites have been discovered so far, with Harappa and Mohenjo-daro being its major urban centres. It is also known as the Harappan civilisation, after its type site Harappa.

=== Early discoveries ===
The ancient mounds of Harappa were first visited by Charles Masson in 1826 who went on to describe them in his book Narrative of Various Journeys in Balochistan, Afghanistan and The Punjab. Alexander Burns in then visited the site in 1831. Alexander Cunningham, who went on to become the founder and director general of the Archaeological Survey of India in 1861, made two trips to the site in 1853 and 1856, and estimated the perimeter of the entire site to be around 3 km (5 km if the adjacent fields were taken into consideration). He found out that some of the mounds had been dug up, and the bricks were being used for the construction of the Lahore–Multan railway line.

=== The first excavations ===
The Archaeological Survey of India formally sent out archaeologists to investigate the site (as well as the one at Mohenjo-Daro) in the early 20th century. Daya Ram Sahni conducted the first excavations at the site from 1921 to 1925. Another round of excavations took place under Madho Sarup Vats from 1926 to 1934. K. A. Nilakanta Sastri led another round in 1937.

=== Post-Independence ===
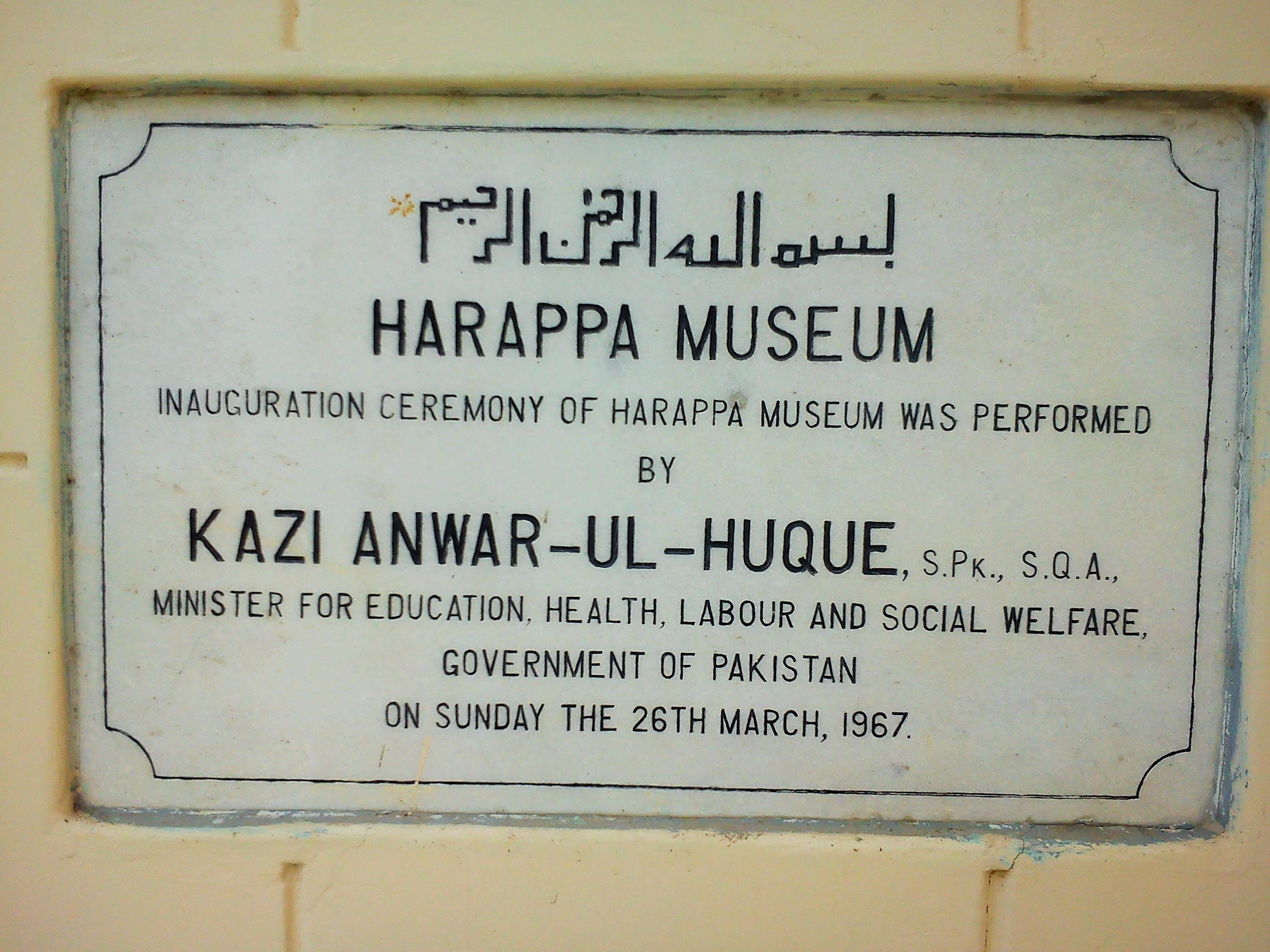
A commemorative plaque of the inauguration ceremony

After the Partition of India, Dr. Mohammad Rafique Mughal conducted excavations at Harappa in 1966, further augmenting the information available about it. On 26 March 1967, the museum was shifted to its current building inaugurated by the Minister for Education, Health, Labour, and Social Welfare, Kazi Anwarul Haque. From 1986 to 2001, the American archaeological mission carried out the Harappa Archeological Research Project at the site in collaboration with the Department of Archaeology and Museums, Government of Pakistan, with George F. Dales serving as one of the co-directors.

== Collection ==
The museum consists of two galleries containing various artifacts that reveal the evolution and development of the arts, crafts, and technology of the Indus Valley Civilization. There are thirty showcases on display currently. Some of the objects include ones made from copper and bronze, terracotta figurines, toys, skeletons, and everyday items made from ivory, shell, and clay.

== See also ==
- List of museums in Pakistan
