= Alamgirpur =

- Archaeological site
- Location within Uttar Pradesh Location within India
- Coordinates: 29°0′11″N 77°29′5″E
- Country: India
- Province: Uttar Pradesh
- Time zone: UTC+5.30 (Indian Standard Time)

Alamgirpur is an archaeological site of the Indus Valley Civilization that thrived along the Ganga-Yamuna Doab (c. 3300–1300 BC) from the Harappan-Bara period, located in Meerut district, Uttar Pradesh, India. It is the easternmost known site of the civilization.

== Excavation ==
The site was partially excavated in 1958 and 1959 by Archaeological Survey of India.

=== Period I ===
On excavation, the site showed four cultural periods with intervening breaks; the earliest of them represented by a thickness of 6 feet, belonged to Harappan Culture. Although kiln burnt bricks were in evidence, no structure of this period was found, probably due to the limited nature of the excavations. Brick sizes were, 11.25 to 11.75 in. in length, 5.25 to 6.25 in. in breadth and 2.5 to 2.75 in.in thickness; larger bricks averaged 14 in. x 8 in.x 4 in. which were used in furnace only. The date range of 2600 to 2200 B.C. (calibrated) has been proposed for the earliest level at Alamgirpur.

=== Artifacts found ===
Typical Harappan pottery was found and the complex itself appeared to be a pottery workshop. Ceramic items found included roof tiles, dishes, cups, vases, cubicle dice, beads, terracotta cakes, carts and figurines of a humped bull and a snake. There were also beads and possibly ear studs made of steatite paste, faience, glass, carnelian, quartz, agate and black jasper. Little metal was in evidence. However, a broken blade made of copper was found.

=== Other findings ===
The head of a bear (?) being a part of a vessel was discovered at Alamgirpur. A small terracotta bead-like structure was coated with gold. Evidence of cloth is found in way of impressions on a trough; yarn used for cloth looked fairly fine and weaving method used is "plain weave".

=== Period II ===
The gap between Period I and Period II was represented by the textural composition of layers in addition to their respective cultural assemblage. Deposits belonging to Period I were compact and brownish. That of Period II was loose and grey with frequent bands of burnt earth and ash. Although kiln burnt bricks were in evidence, no structure of Harappan period was found, probably due to the limited nature of the excavations.

== Importance ==
Discovery of Harappan culture in at Alamgirpur enormously enlarged the horizon of Indus Valley Civilisation in the eastern direction, in India.

Four periods of Alamgirpur respectively belonged to (I) Harappan, (II) Painted Grey Ware (III) Early historical and (IV) Late Medieval Period.

== See also ==
- Daimabad, souththernmost IVC site
- Shortugai, northernmost IVC site
- Sutkagan Dor, westernmost IVC site
- Sokhta Koh
- Malwan
