= Mohammad Rafique Mughal =

Pakistani archaeologist

Mohammed Rafique Mughal
- Born: 1936 (age 89–90); Gujranwala, Punjab, British India (now in Pakistan)
- Awards: Tamgha-i-Imtiaz (Medal of Excellence) Award by the Government of Pakistan in 1992
- Scientific career
- Fields: Archaeology and Ethnoarchaeology; Indus Valley Archaeology; International Heritage Management

Muhammad Rafiq Mugal (born 1936) is a Pakistani archaeologist, engaged in investigating of ethnoarchaeological research in Chitral, northern Pakistan. He has been responsible for the direction, technical support and supervision for restoration and conservation of more than thirty monuments and excavated remains of the Islamic, Buddhist and Proto-historic periods, in Punjab, Khyber-Pakhtunkhwa and Gilgit-Baltistan of Pakistan. He served as a professor of archaeology and heritage management and the director of undergraduate studies at Boston University. He is now Professor Emeritus of Archaeology at Boston University.

== Contributions in restoration and conservation ==
Mughal supervised the preparation of a number of conservation and restoration projects of archaeological and architectural heritage of Pakistan. He also planned, organized and directed archaeological fieldworks and research projects of extensive surveys involving documentation of sites, monuments, and excavations across the world on locations of diverse cultural contents ranging in date from the Prehistoric to Islamic periods. He also conducted extensive surveys in co-ordination of various international archaeologists for explorations in Sindh, Balochistan, Punjab, Khyber-Pakhtunkhwa and Northern Areas of Pakistan that led to the discovery of various settlements of the Indus Civilization and of other cultural contents.

=== Museum development ===
Mughal has contributed to the development of several museums in Pakistan. This includes contributing to establishing the Islamabad Museum in 1994. He also helped to reorganize Swat Museum, Saidu Sharif in collaboration with Japanese museologists. He was also a leading figure in proposing the establishment of the Museum of Archaeology and Anthropology at Gilgit in 1993, the Museum at Rohtas Fort (1994), the Ethnological and Archaeological Museum at Multan (1995) and for the expansion of Taxila Museum (1994).

=== Heritage conservation and management ===
Rafique Mughal has been involved in archaeological conservation of the following sites and monuments:

- Buddhist monasteries, stupas and city remains in the Swat and Taxila Valleys;
- Structural remains of the Indus Civilization at Harappa;
- Islamic buildings of 16th and 17th centuries AD namely, Lahore Fort and Shalamar Garden (both on UNESCO's World Heritage List)
- Baradari (garden pavilion) of Wazir Khan Mosque
- Tombs of Mughal Emperor Jahangir, Ali Mardan Khan, Prince Pervez, Mir Chakar Khan Rind;
- Nandana Fort;
- Hiran Minar and Pavilion;
- Mosques of Mariyam Zamani; Dai Anga and Akbari Sarai;
- Baoli (stepped well) at Jandiala Sher Khan.

=== Major international collaborations ===
- 1990: Co-Investigator with H. Fujiwara from Japan for research on rice at Harappa in archaeological contexts.
- 1996: Collaboration with Rita P. Wright from the United States for a Joint Field Survey around the city of Harappa and beyond.
- 1980–82: Joint Excavations at Sar and Buri, Bahrain with local and Australian teams.
- 1966: Collaborative Survey of sites in the Malir River Basin, Lower Sindh with Walter A. Fairservis from the USA.
- 1960: Collaboration with George F. Dales in the survey along the Makran Coast of Baluchistan.
- 1958: Participant in the excavations at Charsada headed by Sir Mortimer Wheeler from the United Kingdom.

== Archaeological excavations ==
=== Indus Civilization and Bronze Age sites ===
- Excavations at Jhukar, 1973–74
- Malir Megaliths, 1975
- Harappa, 1967 and 1992
- Jalilpur, 1971 and 1976
- Jhang, 1974
- Sutkagan Dor, 1960
- Sar al-Jisr (Bahrain), 1980–81 and 1981–82
- Buri and A'Ali (Bahrain), 1980–82

=== Buddhist and Early Historical or Medieval sites ===
- Lahore Fort, 1959
- Aibek's Grave, 1960;
- Tulamba, 1963–64
- Satgara, 1971
- Charsadda, 1958 (with Sir Mortimer Wheeler)
- Nimogram, 1967;
- Pan Dheri, 1967;
- Mainamati (Bangladesh), 1962–63
- Paharpur (Bangladesh), 1963

=== Early Islamic sites ===
- Mansurah, 1965–66, (headed by Dr. F. A. Khan); 1967 and 1982–83;
- Banbhore, 1958, 1959–60 (headed by Dr.F.A. Khan), 1960–61, 1961–62, 1964 and 1965 (headed by Muhammad Rafique Mughal)
- Bhiro Bham, 1964.

=== Punjab Province ===
- Cholistan, 1974, 1975, 1976 and 1977
- Multan and Faisalabad, 1967, 1971, 1973 and 1976;
- Sahiwal, 1966 and 1971;
- Dera Ghazi Khan, 1961;
- Lahore, 1990

=== Sindh Province ===
- Jacobabad, 1961;
- Nawab Shah and Thatta, 1963;
- Malir River Basin, 1964 (headed by Walter A. Fairservis);
- Sukkur-Rohri, 1966 and 1983;
- Karachi and Thano Bula Khan, 1966;
- Sindh Kohistan, 1983;
- Nagar and Parkar, 1987;

=== Khyber-Pakhtunkhwa Province and Northern Areas ===
- Swat and Dir, 1966
- Gilgit and Hunza region, 1979

=== Balochistan Province ===
- Northern and Central Balochistan, 1973;
- Makran Coast, 1960 (headed by George F.Dales);
- Las Bela, 1962;
- Kej Valley, Mekran, 1964.

Mughal was also the project director of two major schemes for "Survey and Documentation of Sites and Monuments in Sindh and Punjab" between 1993 and 1996.

== Publications ==
Books and Edited Volumes:

- In preparation Sir Aural Stein’s Survey of the Ghaggar-Hakra Region, Thar Desert 1940–42.
- 1998 The Archaeology of Sindh: Updated supplement to the Antiquities of Sind. 3rd. Department of Culture and Tourism, Government of Sindh, Karachi: 153–208.
- 1997 Ancient Cholistan, Archaeology and Architecture. Ferozesons, Lahore.ISBN 969-0-01350-5
- 1995 PIATR: The Pakistan Institute of Archaeological Training and Research – A Comprehensive Report 1988-95. Department of Archaeology and Museums, Karachi. by Mohammed Rafique Mughal and Gulzar M. Khan.
- 1983 The Dilmun Burial Complex at Sar: 1980–82 excavations in Bahrain. Ministry of Information, Directorate of Archaeology and Museums, State of Bahrain
- 1973 Present State of Research on the Indus Valley Civilization. International Symposium on Mohenjo-daro. Department of Archaeology & Museums, Karachi
- 1970 The Early Harappan Period in the Greater Indus Valley and Northern Balochistan, ca. 3000–2400 BC. Ph.D. Thesis. Department of Anthropology, University of Pennsylvania, Philadelphia. (University Microfilms, Ann Arbor, Michigan, No.71-19, 263)

Articles:

- 2005 Impact of urbanisation around the city of Lahore and the world heritage monument of Shalamar Garden. In Proceedings of ICOMOS 15th General Assembly and Scientific Symposium on “Monuments in their Setting: Conserving Cultural Heritage in Changing Townscapes and Landscapes,” Volume 1: 419–24. World Publishing Corporation, Xi’an.
- 2005 Monuments at Kunya-Urgench, Turkmenistan: Comments on preservation, policies, and procedures. Circle of Inner Asian Art. 20:16–9.
- 2005 Sir Aurel Stein's papers on the survey of Ghaggar-Hakra River, 1940–42. In South Asian Archaeology 2001, edited by C. Jarrige and V. Lefevre: 277-80. Paris.
- 2005 Geoarchaeology of Harappa's eastern countryside: Observations along the buried bed of the Upper Beas River, Punjab Province, Pakistan. In South Asian Archaeology 2001, edited by C. Jarrige and V. Lefevre: 277-80. Paris. by Mohammed Rafique Mughal, J. Schuldenrein, Rita Wright, and M. Afzal Khan.
- 2004 Landscapes, soils, and mound histories of the Upper Indus Valley, Pakistan: New insights on the Holocene environments near ancient Harappa. Journal of Archaeological Science. 31: 777–97. by Mohammed Rafique Mughal, J. Schuldenrein, Rita Wright, and M. Afzal Khan.
- 2003 Evidence of rice and ragi at Harappa in the context of South Asian prehistory. In Introduction of African Crops into South Asia, V. N. Misra, and M. D. Kajale: 73–8. Indian Society for Prehistoric and Quaternary Studies, Pune.
- 2001 Resurrecting Sir Aurel Stein from the Cholistan Desert, Context. 15(2): 1–4.
- 1997 A preliminary review of archaeological surveys in Punjab and Sindh: 1993–95. South Asian Studies. 13: 275–84.
- 1997 Recent documentation of ancient sites and monuments in the Punjab Province. Punjab Journal of Archaeology and History. 1(1). by Muhammad Afzal Khan and Muhammad Hassan.
- 1996 Archaeological sites and monuments in Punjab: Preliminary results of explorations, 1992–96. Pakistan Archaeology. Special Number 29. by Farooq Iqbal, Muhammad Afzal Khan and Muhammad Hassan.
- 1996 The Indus Valley: 3000–1500 BC. In History of Humanity: Scientific and Cultural Development, edited by A. H. Dani and J. -P. Mohan. Vol. II: 246-65. UNESCO and Routledge, Paris and London. by B. K. Thapar.
- 199 Theory and Practice in Garden Conservation. In, Hussain, M., Rehman, A. and Wescoat, J.L. (eds), The Mughal Garden: Interpretation, Conservation and Implications. Islamabad – Lahore – Karachi: Ferozsons (pvt.) Ltd. :111- 113.
- 1994 The Harappan Nomads of Cholistan. In, Allchin B. (ed.), Living Traditions: Studies in the Ethnoarchaeology of South Asia: 53–68. Oxford & 1BH Publishing, New Delhi
- 1992 The Geographical Extent of the Indus Civilization during the Early, Mature and Late Harappan Times. In, Possehl, G. (ed.), South Asian Archaeology Studies. New Delhi: Oxford & IBH Publishing Co. Pvt. Ltd.: 123-43.
- 1992 The consequences of River Changes for the Harappan settlements in Cholistan. Eastern Anthropologist. 45(1–2): 105–16.
- 1992 Jhukar and the late Harappan Cultural mosaic of the Greater Indus Valley. In South Asian Archaeology 1989, Jarrige C. (ed.), . Madison, Wisconsin: The Prehistory Press: 213-21.
- 1992 Rice and Ragi at Harappa: Preliminary Results by Plant Opal Analysis, Pakistan Archaeology(Karachi), No. 27: 129–142.
- 199 Ancient Sites in Cholistan, Bahawalpur (1974–77). Lahore Museum Bulletin. IV (2): 1–52.
- 1991 The Cultural Patterns of Ancient Pakistan and Neighboring Regions, circa 7000–1500 BC, Pakistan Archaeology.26: 218–237.
- 1990 Archaeological Field Research in Pakistan since Independence: An Overview, Bulletin of Deccan College and Postgraduate Research Institute (Pune), Vol.49: 261–278.
- 1990 Further Evidence of the Harappan Culture in the Greater Indus Valley: 1971–90, South Asian Studies (London), No. 6: 175- 199.
- 1990 The Protohistoric Settlement Patterns in the Cholistan Desert, Pakistan. In, Teddei, M. (ed.), South Asian Archaeology 1987. Rome: Instituto Italiano per il Medio ed Estremo Oriente: 143- 156.
- 1990 The Decline of the Indus Civilization and the Late Harappan Period in the Indus Valley, Lahore Museum Bulletin (Lahore), Vol.III (2): 1–17.
- 1990 The Harappan Settlement Systems and Patterns in the Greater Indus Valley (Circa 3500–1500 BC), Pakistan Archaeology (Karachi), No.25: 1–72.
- 1990 The Harappan twin Capitals and Reality, Journal of Central Asia, (Islamabad), Vol. XIII (1): 155–162.
- 1990 New archaeological evidence on the Harappan problem from the recent researches in the Cholistan Desert. Kokogaku Zasshi. 75(3): 34–57.
- 1989 The development of Protohistoric research in Pakistan: 1970–85. Journal of Central Asia. 3(1): 47–77.
- 1988 The Buddhist road: Rock engravings along the Karakorum Highway, Museum Kyushu. 28(1): 59–61.
- 1988 Genesis of the Indus Valley Civilization. Lahore Museum Bulletin. 1(1): 45–54.
- 1987 Die Indus Civilization: Entstehung Einer Hockhultur. Vegessene Stadte Am Indus, Mainz Am Rhein: Verlag Philipp Von Zabern: 112-8.
- 1988 La naissance de la civilisation de l'Indus. In Les Cities Oubliees de lí Indus: Archaeologie due Pakistan: 71-4. Musee National des Arts Asiatiques Guimet, Paris.
- 1985 The significance of some Pre-and Protohistoric discoveries in the Karakorum Region. Journal of Central Asia. 8(2): 213–35.
- 1985 Tombs of Uchh. Heritage í85. 39–44.
- 1985 History of Lahore and its Monuments. In, Shakoori, A. R. and Mirza, M. R. (eds.), Souvenir Sixth Pakistan Congress of Zoology, Lahore: Department of Zoology, University of the Punjab: 1–7.
- 1984 Allama Iqbal Museum. Pakistan Pictorial (Islamabad), Vol. III (6): 9–13.
- 1984 The Post-Harappan Phase in Bahawalpur District, Pakistan. In, Lal, B.B. and Gupta, S.P. (eds.), Frontiers of the Indus Civilization. New Delhi: Books and Books: 499–503.
- 1983 Current Research Trends on the Rise of Indus Civilization. In, Urban G. /Jansen M. (eds.), Veroffentlichungen des Geodatischen Institutes der Rheinisch -Westfalischen TechnischenHochschule Aachen, Nr. 34:500 and 6. December 1981 (Aachen, Germany): 13–20, 1983.
- 1982 Recent archaeological research in the Cholistan Desert. In Harappan Civilization: A contemporary perspective, edited by G. L. Possehl: 85–95. Oxford & IBH Publishing, New Delhi.
- 1981 New archaeological evidence from Bahawalpur. In Indus Civilization: New Perspective, edited by A. H. Dani: 33–41. Centre for the Study of the Civilizations of Central Asia, Quaid-e Azam University, Islamabad.
- 1980 The origins of the Indus Civilization. Sindhological Studies. 1–10.
- 1978 The Early Harappan Cultural Phase: A reply. Purattatva. 10: 84–8.
- 1975 Cultural links between Pakistan and Iran during the Protohistoric Period (5000–1000 BC). In Pakistan-Iran: A common culture: 33–82. Institute of Persian Studies, Islamabad.
- 1974 Explorations in Northern Balochistan, 1972: New evidence and fresh interpretation. In Proceedings of the IInd Annual Symposium on Archaeological Research in Iran: 276-86. Muzeh- e-Iran Bastan, Tehran
- 1974 New evidence of the Early Harappan culture from Jalilpur. Archaeology. 27(2): 276–86
- 1972 A summary of excavations and explorations in Pakistan. Pakistan Archaeology. 8: 113–58
- 1972 Introduction to the pottery of Periods I and II of Sarai Khola. In Excavations at Sarai Khola, Part II, edited by M. A. Halim. Pakistan Archaeology. 8: 34–53
- 1967 Excavations at Tulamba, West Pakistan. Pakistan Archaeology. 4: 11–152
- 1964 Gujarat by the Chenab. Pakistan Quarterly. 12(1): 12–9

== Awards and recognition ==
- Serves as one of the World Heritage Destinations Rated: Panelists for the National Geographic Society
- Tamgha-i-Imtiaz (Medal of Excellence) Award by the Government of Pakistan in 1992 for making outstanding contributions to the archaeology and culture of Pakistan

== See also ==
- Ahmad Hasan Dani
- Chanhudaro
- Mohenjodaro
- Harappa
