= Chanhudaro =

Indus Valley archaeological site in Pakistan

Chanhu-daro, a shorter form of Chanhun-jo-daro which in Sindhi means "the mound of Chanhun", is an archaeological site belonging to the Indus Valley civilization. The site is located 130 kilometers (81 mi) south of Mohenjo-daro, now in Sindh, Pakistan. The settlement was inhabited between 4000 and 1700 BCE, and is considered to have been a centre for manufacturing carnelian beads. This site is a group of three low mounds that excavations has shown were parts of a single settlement, approximately 7 hectares in size.

Chanhudaro was first excavated by N. G. Majumdar in March, 1931, and again during winter field session of 1935-36 by the American School of Indic and Iranian Studies and the Museum of Fine Arts, Boston team led by Ernest John Henry Mackay. Prof. W. Norman Brown of the University of Pennsylvania was instrumental in enabling the funds for this project. After the independence of Pakistan, Mohammed Rafique Mughal also did exploratory work in the area.

Since 2015 the archaeological excavations have been carried out by the French Archaeological Mission in the Indus Basin (MAFBI), directed by Aurore Didier (CNRS). The excavations are carried out in cooperation with the Department of Archaeology and Museums, Government of Pakistan and the Culture Department, Government of Sindh.

== Historical significance ==
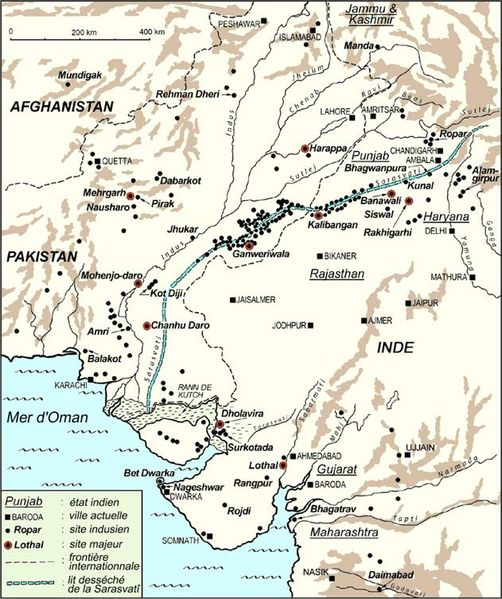
Indus Valley sites

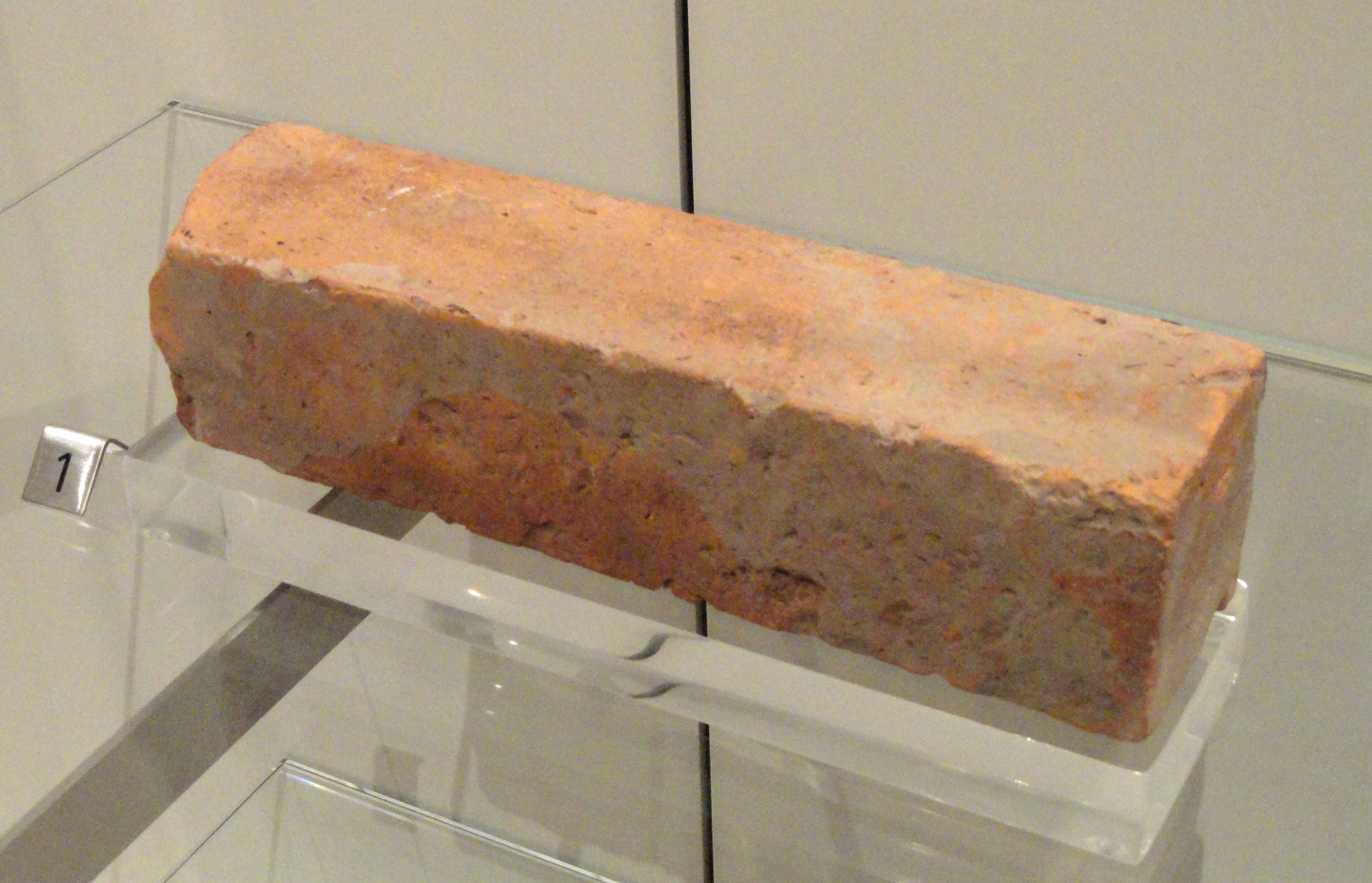
Harappan Phase Cut brick c. 2500 – 1900 BCE, Chanhu Daro, Pakistan

Chanhudaro is one of the most important sites of Indus civilization. More than 2800 sites belonging to Indus Civilization are identified so far and Chanhu-daro is one of the bigger sites where lot of scope is identified for excavation. However, of late, excavations in this site have not been in progress leading to a decline in contributions from this site. It is situated in a desert area, but it is believed that the Indus River used to flow near this site. The Indus River also known as the "Sarasvati" in post-Harappan Vedic scripture, is believed to have changed course during 2nd millennium BC, causing the life at Chanhudaro and several hundreds of dwellings situated on the banks of Sarasvati to become very difficult. The people there probably had to abandon their dwelling places and it is thought that changing course of the Indus is one of the reasons for the decline of these dwellings, (cities and villages) which in turn contributed to the decline of Indus Civilization itself.

== Early excavation ==
Chanhudaro is about 12 miles east of present-day Indus river bed. Chanhu-Daro was investigated in 1931 by the Indian archaeologist N. G. Majumdar. It was observed that this ancient city was very similar to Harappa and Mohenjadaro in several aspects like town planning, building layout etc.

The site was excavated in the mid-1930s by the American School of Indic and Iranian Studies and the Boston Museum of Fine Arts, where several important details of this ancient city was investigated.

== Town planning ==
For building houses, baked bricks were used extensively at Chanhudaro and Mohenjo-daro. Several constructions were identified as workshops or industrial quarters and some of the buildings of Chanhudaro might have been warehouses.

== Industrial activity ==
Evidence of shell working was found at Chanhudaro and bangles and ladles were made at this site. Harappan seals were made generally in bigger towns like Harappa, Mohenjadaro and Chanhudaro which were involved with administrative network.

== Artefacts found ==
Copper knives, spears, razors, tools, axes, vessels and dishes were found, causing this site to be nicknamed the "Sheffield of the British Empire" by Ernest Mackay. Copper fish hooks were also recovered from this site. Terracotta cart models, a small terracotta bird which when blown acts as a whistle, plates and dishes were found. Male spear thrower or dancer - a broken statue (4.1 cm) is of much importance, found at Chanhudaro, is now displayed at Museum of Fine Arts, Boston, USA. Indus Seals are also found at Chanhudaro and Chanhudaro is considered one of the centres where seals were manufactured. The scale of craft production at Chanhudaro seems much greater than that at Mohenjodaro, perhaps taking up half of town for this activity.

== Bead making factory ==
An Impressive workshop, recognised as Bead Making Factory, was found at Chanhudaro, which included a furnace. Shell bangles, beads of many materials, steatite seals and metal works were manufactured at Chanhudaro.

A wide variety of materials were used to make beads here, ranging from precious stones like carnelian, jasper, quartz; metals like gold, copper and bronze; and even shell, terracotta (burnt clay) or faience (silica or sand mixed with gum and colour and then burned). These beads were made in a variety of shapes like discs, cylindrical, spherical, segmented or barrel-like. Softer materials like steatite could be moulded easily while other rocks were worked with a paste of steatite powder to make different shapes of beads. Harder stones resulted in geometrical beads.

== Cultivation ==
Sesame, which is a native of South Africa, is known from number of Harappan sites, including Chanhudaro, probably grown for oil. Peas are also grown at Chanhudaro.

== Importance ==
In respect of Indus Script, ||/ sign is only found on inscriptions found at Chanhudaro. It occurred on eleven objects, (around one sixth of all inscribed objects recovered from Chanhudaro) leading to suggestion by Asko Parapola that it may represent town's name.

Cotton cloth traces preserved on silver or bronze objects were known from Chanhudaro, Harappa and Rakhigarhi.

Objects of Iron were reported from Chanhudaro, Ahar, Rajasthan and Mundigak and this gains importance as it has been claimed that Iron was produced in 3rd Millennium in South Asia.

== Bibliography ==
- Aurore Didier. Nouvelles recherches sur les débuts de la Civilisation de l'Indus (2500-1900 av. n. è.) au Pakistan. Les fouilles de Chanhu-daro (Sindh). Comptes-rendus des séances de l'Académie des inscriptions et belles-lettres, Paris : Durand : Académie des inscriptions et belles-lettres, 2017, Comptes rendus des séances de l'année 2017,, Avril à juin, pp. 947–980
- Aurore Didier, David Sarmiento Castillo, Pascal Mongne, Syed Shakir Ali Shah. Resuming excavations at Chanhu-daro, Sindh: First results of the 2015-2017 field-seasons. Pakistan Archaeology, Department of Archaeology and Museums of Pakistan, 2017, 30, pp. 69–121.
- Quivron, G. (2000). The Evolution on the Mature Indus Pottery Style in the Light of the Excavations at Nausharo, Pakistan. East and West, 50(1/4), 147-190. Retrieved February 5, 2021, from JSTOR 29757453

== See also ==
- Indus Valley civilization
- List of Indus Valley Civilization sites
- List of inventions and discoveries of the Indus Valley Civilization
- Hydraulic engineering of the Indus Valley Civilization
- Sutkagan Dor
- Gola Dhoro
- Kerala-no-dhoro
- Lakhueen-jo-daro
- Harappa
