= Aurore Didier =

French archaeologist

Aurore Didier (born 1978) is a French archaeologist and researcher. At the French National Center for Scientific Research, she is in charge of the ‘Indus-Balochistan programme’, and director of the French Archaeological Mission in the Indus Basin. Her primary interest is South Asian protohistory, specifically the Bronze Age in the Indo-Iranian Borderlands (3000 BCE) and the Indus Valley Civilization.

== Early life and education ==
Didier was raised near Paris, alongside her older brother and her younger brother. She was raised in an artistic environment, with her father being a professional musicians involved in the film industry. Didier spent 15 years doing ballet and other dance styles as an extracurricular. She also became interested in archaeology at a young age, sparked by her mother taking her to museums every week. By age 12, she had decided to pursue archaeology as a career.

Didier attended Paris 1 Panthéon-Sorbonne University for her master's degree, during which she focused on the Indus Valley Civilization, and her PhD in archaeology, during which she specialized in pottery. In 2007, she defended her PhD, based on her archaeological work in Makran, in Paris.

== Career ==
Didier has worked at sites in Ladakh, India, Oman, and Turkmenistan. For two years, she headed pottery studies at the French-Indian Archeological programme in Ladakh.

In 2000, Didier began working in Pakistan as part of the Pakistan-French Archaeological Mission in Makran. There, she worked at Shahi Tump, a site near Turbat, overseeing excavations alongside other archaeologists. From 2001 until 2007, Didier spent four months each year (January to April) in Makran. In the course of doing so, Didier learned Balochi through her interactions with local colleagues and residents.

In 2012, Didier began working at the French National Center for Scientific Research (CNRS) as the head of the Indus-Balochistan program.

In 2013, Didier became the director of the French Archaeological Mission in the Indus Basin. The mission resumed its field programs in 2015. As part of these programs, Didier has worked at Chanhudaro, a site in Sindh, Pakistan.

In 2014, Didier was chosen by Catherine Jarrige to head the archaeological program at Mehrgarh in Pakistan. That same year, she received a grant from the Shelby White and Leon Levy Program for Archaeological Publications at Harvard University.

== Publications ==
=== Books and chapters ===
- Didier, Aurore (2013). La production céramique du Makran (Pakistan) à l'âge du Bronze ancien. Contribution à l'étude du peuplement ancien des régions indo-iraniennes (in French). De Boccard.
- Didier, Aurore; Mutin, Benjamin; Bauvais, Sylvain; Cloquet, Christophe; Marin, Jérôme; Shalev, Sariel (2020). "Compositional Analyses of Chalcolithic and Bronze Age Ceramics from the Indo-Iranian Borderlands and southern Central Asia: Preliminary Results and Interpretations". The Roxiana Project. Archaeological Researches on Metal and Pottery Assemblages from the Oxus Basin to the Indus Valley during Protohistory. Dietrich Reimer Verlag.

=== Articles ===
- Besenval, Roland; Didier, Aurore (2004). "Peuplement protohistorique du Kech-Makran au 3 e Millénaire av. J.-C. : l'assemblage céramique de la période IIIc sur le site de Miri Qalat". Paléorient. 30 (2): 159–177. doi:10.3406/paleo.2004.1018. ISSN 0153-9345. JSTOR 41496706.
- Jarrige, Jean-François; Didier, Aurore; Quivron, Gonzague (2011). "Shahr-i Sokhta and the Chronology of the Indo-Iranian Regions". Paléorient. 37 (2): 7–34. doi:10.3406/paleo.2011.5420. ISSN 0153-9345. JSTOR 43265265. S2CID 190282352.
- Méry, S.; Besenval, R.; Blackman, M.J.; Didier, A. (2012). "The origin of the third-millennium BC fine grey wares found in eastern Arabia". Proceedings of the Seminar for Arabian Studies. 42: 195–204. ISSN 0308-8421. JSTOR 41623637.
- Didier, Aurore; Mutin, Benjamin (2013-09-01). "La production céramique protohistorique du Makran pakistanais dans la compréhension des relations indo-iraniennes". Cahiers d'Asie centrale (in French) (21/22): 461–486. ISSN 1270-9247.
- Didier, Aurore (2017). "Nouvelles recherches sur les débuts de la civilisation de l'Indus au Pakistan. Les fouilles de Chanhu-Daro (Sindh)". Comptes rendus des séances de l'Académie des Inscriptions et Belles-Lettres. 161 (2): 969–1002. doi:10.3406/crai.2017.96268. S2CID 246882972.
- Reynaud, Corentin; Thoury, Mathieu; Dazzi, Alexandre; Latour, Gaël; Scheel, Mario; Li, Jiayi; Thomas, Ariane; Moulhérat, Christophe; Didier, Aurore; Bertrand, Loïc (2020-08-18). "In-place molecular preservation of cellulose in 5,000-year-old archaeological textiles". Proceedings of the National Academy of Sciences. 117 (33): 19670–19676. Bibcode:2020PNAS..11719670R. doi:10.1073/pnas.2004139117. ISSN 0027-8424. PMC 7443972. PMID 32747556.
