= Sutkagan Dor =

Indus River Valley civilization archaeological site

Sutkagen Dor
- Sutkagen Dor
- Location within West and Central Asia
- 25°29′59.72″N 61°57′3.15″E
- Type: Settlement
- Cultures: Indus Valley civilisation
- Location: Balochistan, Pakistan
- Region: Makran

Site notes
- Area: 4.5 ha (11 acres)

Sutkagan Dor (or Sutkagen Dor) is the westernmost known archaeological site of the Indus Valley civilisation. It is located about 480 km west of Karachi on the Makran coast near Gwadar, close to the Iranian border, in Pakistan's Balochistan Province. The site is within the Union Council of Suntsar and is near the western bank of the Dasht River and its confluence with a smaller stream, known as the Gajo Kaur. It was a smaller settlement with substantial stone walls and gateways.

== Discovery ==
Sutkagan Dor was discovered in 1876 by Major Edward Mockler, who conducted small-scale excavation. Mockler was the Assistant Political Agent for the Makran Coast who also studied the Balochi language.

In year 1928, Aurel Stein visited the area as part of his Gedrosia tour, and carried out further digs. In October 1960, Sutkagan Dor was more extensively excavated by George F. Dales as part of his Makran Survey, uncovering structures made from stone and mud bricks without straw.

== Architecture ==
This site measures approximately 4.5 hectares (300 m × 150 m). Along with the typical "citadel" and "lower town", there is a massive fortification wall of semi-dressed stones. This citadel wall varies in height and thickness due to the irregular contours of the natural rock foundation, but at one point about midway along the eastern wall, it is approximately 7.5 m thick at the base. The inner face of the wall is slightly battered, whereas the outer face has a decided slope, varying from 23° to 40°.

== Coastal route ==
Though inland at present, the site may have been near navigable water in ancient times, on a trade route between other centers. A coastal route existed linking sites such as Lothal and Dholavira to Sutkagan Dor on the Makran coast. It has been suggested that the site may well have been an important trading post, connecting seaborne trade from the Persian Gulf and the Arabian Sea to the hinterland.

== Findings ==
Stein recovered 127 flint blades without cores measuring up to 27.5 cm. Stone vessels, stone arrowheads, copper arrowheads, shell beads, pottery, and various other items were found. A copper-bronze disc probably associated with the Bactria–Margiana Archaeological Complex (BMAC) was also discovered there.

== See also ==
- Indus Valley civilisation
- List of Indus Valley Civilisation sites
- List of inventions and discoveries of the Indus Valley Civilisation
- Hydraulic engineering of the Indus Valley Civilisation
- Shortugai, northernmost IVC site
- Alamgirpur, easternmost IVC site
- Sutkagan Dor, westernmost IVC site
- Daimabad, southernmost IVC site
- Sokhta Koh
- Malwan
