= George F. Dales =

American archaeologist (1927–1992)

- Born: George Franklin Dales Jr. August 13, 1927; Akron, Ohio, U.S.
- Died: April 25, 1992 (aged 64); Berkeley, California, U.S.
- Education: University of Akron; University of Pennsylvania (PhD)
- Occupation: Archaeologist
- Scientific career
- Fields: Archaeology

George Franklin Dales Jr. (August 13, 1927 – April 25, 1992), was an archaeology professor at the University of Pennsylvania, and later the University of California, Berkeley, where he chaired the South and Southeast Asian Studies department. He was considered a leading expert on Indus valley peoples and their languages.

== Early life ==
Dales was born in Akron, Ohio. He received his bachelor's degree in Classical studies in 1953 from the University of Akron. In 1960, he earned his Ph.D. from the University of Pennsylvania, where he studied the history, art and archeology of the ancient Middle East and the cuneiform scripts of the Sumerian, Akkadian and Hurrian languages. The title of his Ph.D. dissertation was Mesopotamian and Related Female Figurines: Their Chronology, Diffusion and Cultural Functions.

== Career ==
Dales served in the Marine Corps in China from 1945 to 1948. He spent 30 seasons of archeological excavations, starting at Nippur in 1957. Later, he excavated a number of the Indus Valley civilization sites. In 1959, he conducted an archeological survey in the Bandar Abbas region of southern Iran. In 1960, he made a coastal survey (along with his wife Barbara Bradley Dales, T. Cuyler Young, Jr and M.R. Mughal) that showed archeological evidence of trade routes on the Makran coast of Pakistan. In 1964-65, he excavated at Mohenjo-daro for one season. Between 1973 and 1979, Dales excavated at the Indus Valley civilization site of Balakot. From 1961 to 1963 he was a special lecturer at the University of Toronto, Canada. He then returned to the University of Pennsylvania as Assistant (1963–66) and then Associate (1966–72) Curator-in-Charge of the South Asia section of the Penn Museum, with concurrent appointments as Assistant and Associate Professor in the South Asia Regional Studies Department (where he was Co-Chairman in 1970-71).

=== At the University of California, Berkeley ===
In 1972, Dales joined the faculty of the University of California, Berkeley as a member of the Department of Near Eastern Studies. A year later this appointment was adjusted to a half-time appointment in the Department of Near Eastern Studies and a half-time appointment in the Department of South and Southeast Asian Studies. This latter arrangement permitted him to offer courses in both ancient Near Eastern and ancient South Asian archaeology and history. From April 1979 through December 1980, he chaired the Department of South and Southeast Asian Studies. He was also the Chairman of Berkeley's Center for South and Southeast Asian Studies from 1980 to 1982.

=== Harappa Archeological Research Project ===
In 1986, he became one of the co-directors of the Harappa Archeological Research Project, involving a number of universities and institutions.

== Death ==
He died in 1992 at Berkeley.

== Works ==
Dales published more than 80 articles and monographs. His works include Excavations at Mohenjo-Daro, Pakistan: The Pottery (1986), co-authored with his student, Jonathan Mark Kenoyer. This work was published by the University of Pennsylvania. The definitive account of his 1960 survey on the Makran coast of Pakistan, written in the form of an illustrated journal was the last manuscript to be completed by him before his death. This latter work was published by the Archaeological Research Facility of the University of California, Berkeley, in 1992, entitled, Explorations on the Makran coast, Pakistan: A search for paradise.
