= Sokhta Koh =

Archaeological site in Balochistan, Pakistan

Sotkakoh
- Sotkakoh
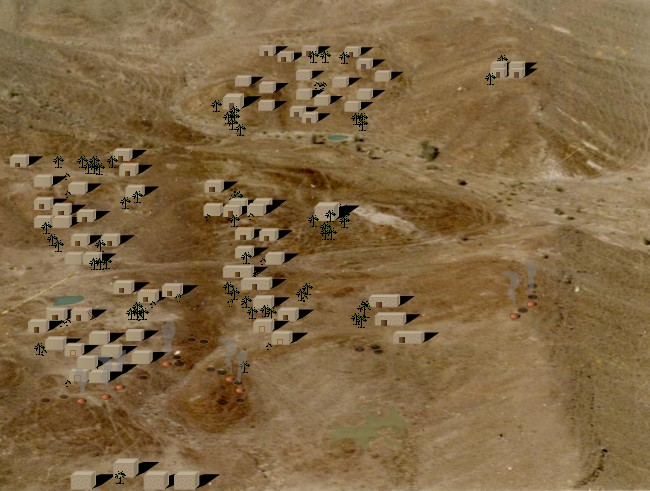
- Computer-aided reconstruction of coastal Harappan settlement at Sokhta Koh near Pasni

- Location within Balochistan, Pakistan Location within Pakistan
- 25°18′0″N 63°25′0″E
- Type: Settlement
- Cultures: Indus Valley Civilization
- Location: Balochistan, Pakistan
- Region: Makran

Sokhta Koh (also known as Sotka Koh; lit. "burnt hill") is a Harappan site on the Makran coast, near the city of Pasni, in the Balochistan province of Pakistan. It was first surveyed by American archaeologist George F. Dales in 1960, while exploring estuaries along the Makran coast. The site is located about 15 miles north of Pasni. A similar site at Sutkagen-dor (also spelt Sutkagan Dor) lies about 48 km (30 mi) inland, astride Dasht River, north of Jiwani. Their position along a coastline (that was possibly much farther inland) goes well with evidence of overseas commerce in Harappan times. Based on pottery styles, it is estimated that the settlement belongs to the Mature Harappan (Integration) Era (2600–1900 BC).

== Topography ==
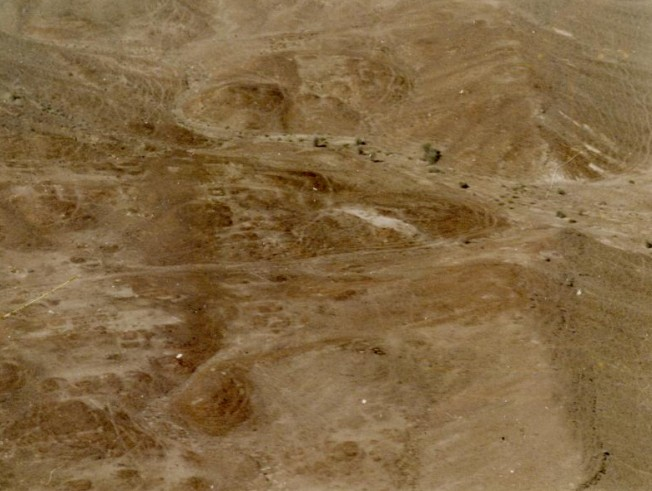
Aerial picture of site, un-retouched

Sokhta Koh is an outcrop of low hillocks in the Shadi Kaur (river) valley, surrounded by jagged, stratified hills north of Pasni. Presently, the river flows just next to the site while loops of old riverbeds meander nearby. Small rivulets and 'nullahs' mostly fed by rainwater, empty into Shadi Kaur, rather anemic in the stark and dry countryside.

While the hillocks are about two miles in circuit, the visible remnants of the settlement, which occupy the south-eastern portion, are less than a mile around. The settlement itself is difficult to appreciate from the ground since no structures stand out in relief. Except for a few sporadic digs, the site has not been extensively excavated.

Dry ravines, which mark out the northern and southern boundaries, traverse the site. Also visible are signs of numerous open-pit ovens buried under rubble. Another noteworthy point is the lack of visible evidence of walled fortification

== Buildings ==
In the absence of detailed excavation, little can be said with certainty about the architecture and buildings. However, at several places, erosion by elements reveals remnants of rooms in which stratified rock was used as a base, over which mud or mud-brick walls were raised. Absence of baked bricks, despite a well-established pottery industry, indicates that rainfall may have been low and hence not a threat to mud structures. Riverine flooding, if any, was also probably not a factor due to the siting of the settlement atop hillocks. An aerial view (picture, above) gives a clear indication of rectangular room foundations as well as alignment with the cardinal points of the compass.

== Pottery ==
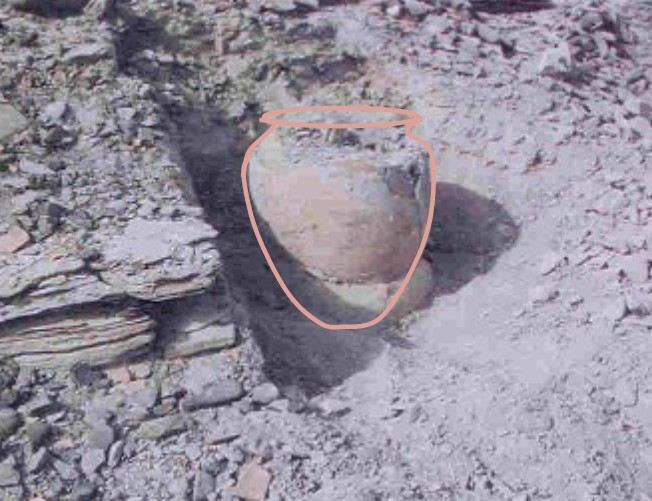
Pottery jar excavated from the corner of a room at Sokhta Koh (Pointed bottom outlined)

The site is strewn all over by hundreds of thousands of potsherds which constitute the visible detritus of the extinct settlement. Scores of open pit ovens for firing the pottery can also be discerned. It is tempting to think of this vast pottery-making industry as a sort of a 'packaging facility' for perishable commodities that were exported in exchange for luxury goods. The shreds are of kiln-baked ware that includes jars, plates, pierced colanders, lids with knobs and fine terra cotta bangle-shaped pieces. The pottery is wheel-turned and mostly pink, with a few buff samples. Some wares, particularly jars, have a reddish glazed band around the neck. The designs are a decorative feature of most pottery and are only of black colour. Designs are restricted to geometrical shapes and include horizontal lines of varying thickness, fish scale patterns, intersecting circles, comb-like patterns and wavy lines. Human and animal motifs are notably absent. 'Potters marks' are evident on the rims of some jars and pots. The complete absence of toys, seals, statues and jewelry, at least at the uppermost level, indicate a rather utilitarian environment. Further excavation is bound to reveal at least some elements that might mitigate the seeming sociocultural isolation of this Harappan outpost.

== Abandonment and relocation ==
Sokhta Koh may have been abandoned due to recession of coast caused by one or more of following reasons:

- Gradual or catastrophic tectonic uplift
- Deposition of alluvial soil/silt in Shadi Kaur delta
- Deposition of sand on beach and in the estuary by wave action

Evidence of ruins of another location nearer to the sea, at the mouth of Shadi Kaur, seems to indicate possible relocation after the estuary harbour at Sokhta Koh had dried up due to coastal recession. Discovery of a harbour, as well as the source of firewood for large-scale pottery firing would be significant challenges for future excavations.

== Significance as a trading outpost ==
Chris J D Kostman in his paper, The Indus Valley Civilization: In Search of Those Elusive Centers and Peripheries , discusses: "A primary, if not the primary, rationale for long-range trade driving force would be a need for 'luxury goods,' raw materials, and other items not found in the riverine alluvial plain which made up the vast majority of the Indus Civilization. In the Indus Valley, sought-after materials included copper, gold, silver, tin, jasper and agate cherts, carnelian, azurite, lapis, fine shell, steatite, antimony, and ivory. Forays would have been made towards and beyond the civilization's peripheral areas to obtain these goods. At the minimum, then, there is an economic motive for inter-regional travel. Silvio Durante's study (1979) of marine shells from India and their appearance in the archaeological record in such distant sites as Tepe Yahya and Shahr-i-Sokhta in Iran, as well as in the Indus Valley, sheds light on the ancient trading routes of certain types of shells which are specifically and exclusively found along the Indian coastline proper. Durante primarily discusses the marine shell Xancus pyrum and the fact that it was traded whole and intact, then worked or reworked (into jewelry? sic) at its destination site, perhaps then moving on to other locations. The importance of this specific shell is that Xancus pyrum has a very limited geographic distribution and thus has almost the same significance in the field of shells as that of lapis lazuli in the context of mineral resources (as regards the determination of the possible routes along which a locally unavailable raw material is transported from a well-defined place of origin to the place where it is processed and, as also in the case of Xancus pyrum, consumed). Perhaps, as these shells crossed so many cultural hands, they were left unfinished in order for the final owner or consumer to work the raw material into a style and usage specific to their region. Durante offers four possible trade routes from their gathering zone along the west and northwest Indian coast to destinations west: sea route direct to the Iranian coastal area; sea route to Sutkagen-dor and Sotka-koh on the Makran coast, then overland westwards; overland through the Indus plain and then through the Makran interior to Sistan; overland through the Indus Valley and then through the Gomal Valley to Sistan."

== See also ==
- List of Indus Valley Civilization sites
- Sutkagan Dor
- Indus Valley Civilization
- Lothal
