= Shortugai =

Trading colony of the Indus Valley Civilization established around 2000 BC

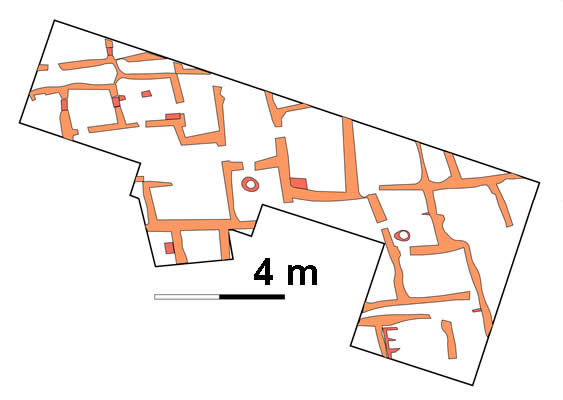
- Part of the excavations

- Location within Afghanistan Location within South Asia
- 37°19′30″N 69°31′30″E
- Type: Settlement
- Cultures: Indus Valley Civilisation
- Location: Takhar Province, Afghanistan

History
- Built: 2000 B.C.

Site notes
- Area: Approximately 4 ha (9.9 acres)

Shortugai (Shortughai), in Darqad District of northern Afghanistan, was a trading colony of the Indus Valley Civilisation (or Harappan Civilisation) established around 2000 BC on the Oxus river (Amu Darya) near the lapis lazuli mines, which serves as the physical, international border line between Afghanistan and Tajikistan. It is considered to be the northernmost settlement of the Indus Valley Civilisation.

== Trading post ==
The IVC site at Shortugai was a trading post of Harappan times and it seems to be connected with lapis lazuli mines located in the surrounding area. It also might have connections with tin trade (found at Afghanistan) and camel trade, along with other Afghan valuables. There are archaeologists who raise the issue of the absence of coinage and of an agreed decipherment despite the extensive trade networks controlled and operated by the settlement.

== Excavation site ==
Excavation site consists of two hills called "Site A" and "Site B" by the excavators. One of these sites was the ancient IVC town, the other one was the citadel. Each of these is about 2 hectares large.

=== Artifact findings ===
The Shortugai site was discovered in 1976 and, since then, excavators were able to find carnelian and lapis lazuli beads, bronze objects, terracotta figurines. Other typical finds of the Indus Valley Civilization include one seal with a short inscription and a rhinoceros motif, clay models of cattle with carts and painted pottery. Pottery with Harappan design, jars, beakers, bronze objects, gold pieces, lapis lazuli beads, other types of beads, drill heads, shell bangles etc. are other findings. Square seals with animal motifs and script confirms this as a site belonging to Indus Valley Civilisation (not just having contact with IVC). Bricks had typical Harappan measurements.

=== Dryland farming ===
A ploughed field with flax seeds in this site indicate dry land farming and irrigation canals dug to bring water from Kokcha (25 km distance) also indicate efforts put in agriculture. There are several theories that explain the existence of canal irrigation system in the area. The first involves the suggestion that the Indus settlers brought the technology with them. Another theory proposes that the canal was part of the influence of the Namazga culture, which flourished in the adjacent southern Turkmenia.

== See also ==
- List of Indus Valley Civilisation sites
- List of archaeological sites by country
- World Heritage Sites by country
