= Harappa =

Archaeological site in Punjab, Pakistan

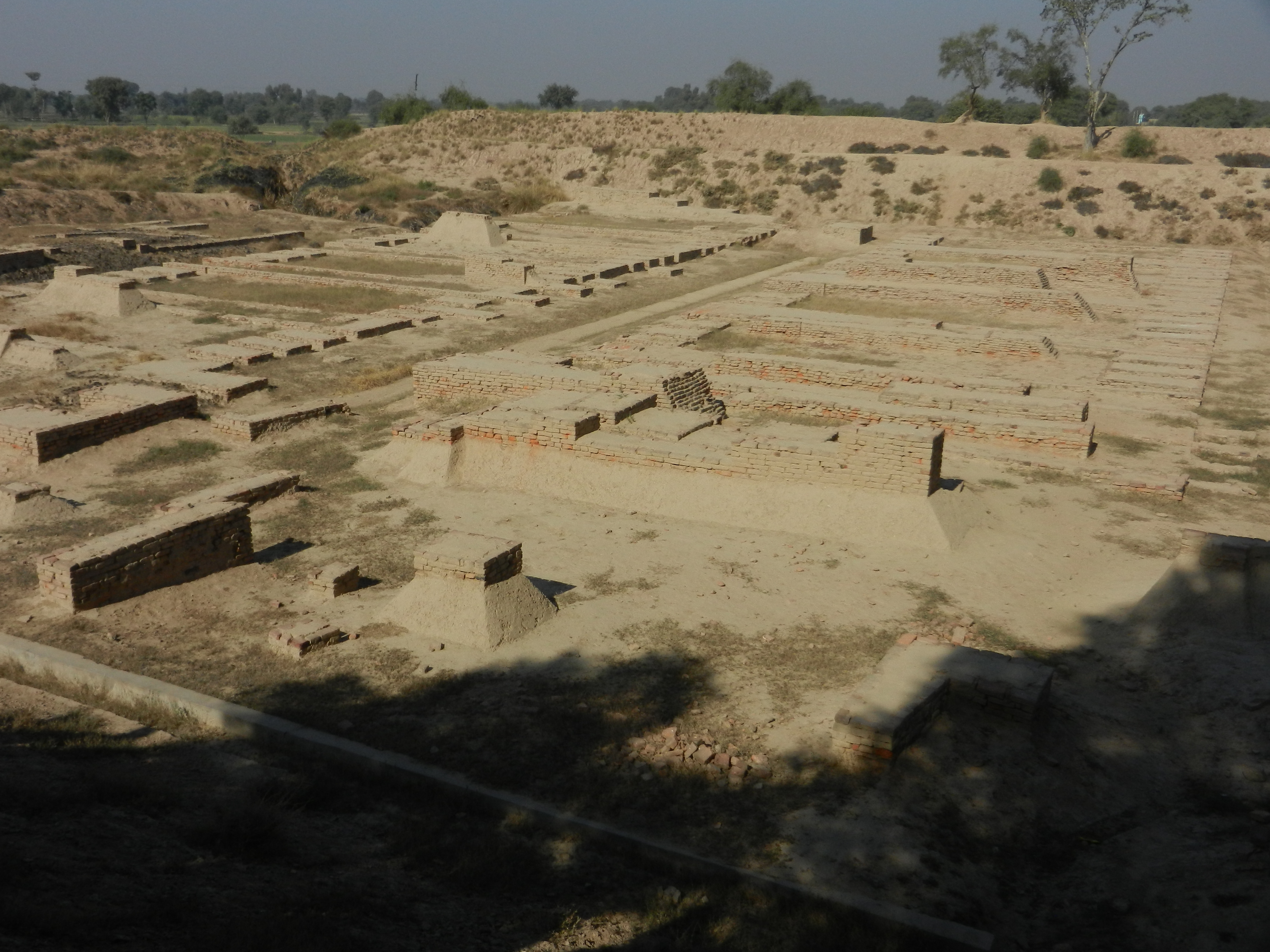
- A view of Harappa's Granary and Great Hall, 2013

- Location in Punjab, Pakistan
- 30°37′44″N 72°51′50″E
- Type: Settlement
- Location: Punjab, Pakistan

History
- Built: c. 3300 BC
- Abandoned: c. 1300 BC

Site notes
- Area: 150 ha (370 acres)
- Condition: Ruined
- Owner: Public
- Management: Government of Punjab, Pakistan (Directorate General of Archaeology)
- Public access: Yes

Harappa (Punjabi pronunciation: [ɦəɽəˈpaː]) was a settlement in Punjab, Pakistan, about 24 kilometres (15 miles) west of Sahiwal, that takes its name from a modern village near the former course of the Ravi River. The Ravi now runs eight kilometres (five miles) to the north.

The city of Harappa is believed to have had as many as 23,500 residents and occupied about 150 hectares (370 acres) with clay brick houses, at its greatest extent during the Mature Harappan phase (2600 BC – 1900 BC), which is considered large for its time.

The ancient city of Harappa was heavily damaged under British rule when bricks from the ruins were used as track ballast to construct the Lahore–Multan Railway. The current village of Harappa is less than one kilometre (5/8 mi) from the ancient site. Although modern Harappa has a legacy railway station from the Raj period, it is a small crossroads town of 15,000 people today. In 2004, the site was added to the tentative list for UNESCO World Heritage Sites. In 2005, a controversial amusement park scheme at the site was abandoned when builders unearthed many archaeological artifacts during the early stages of building work.

== History ==
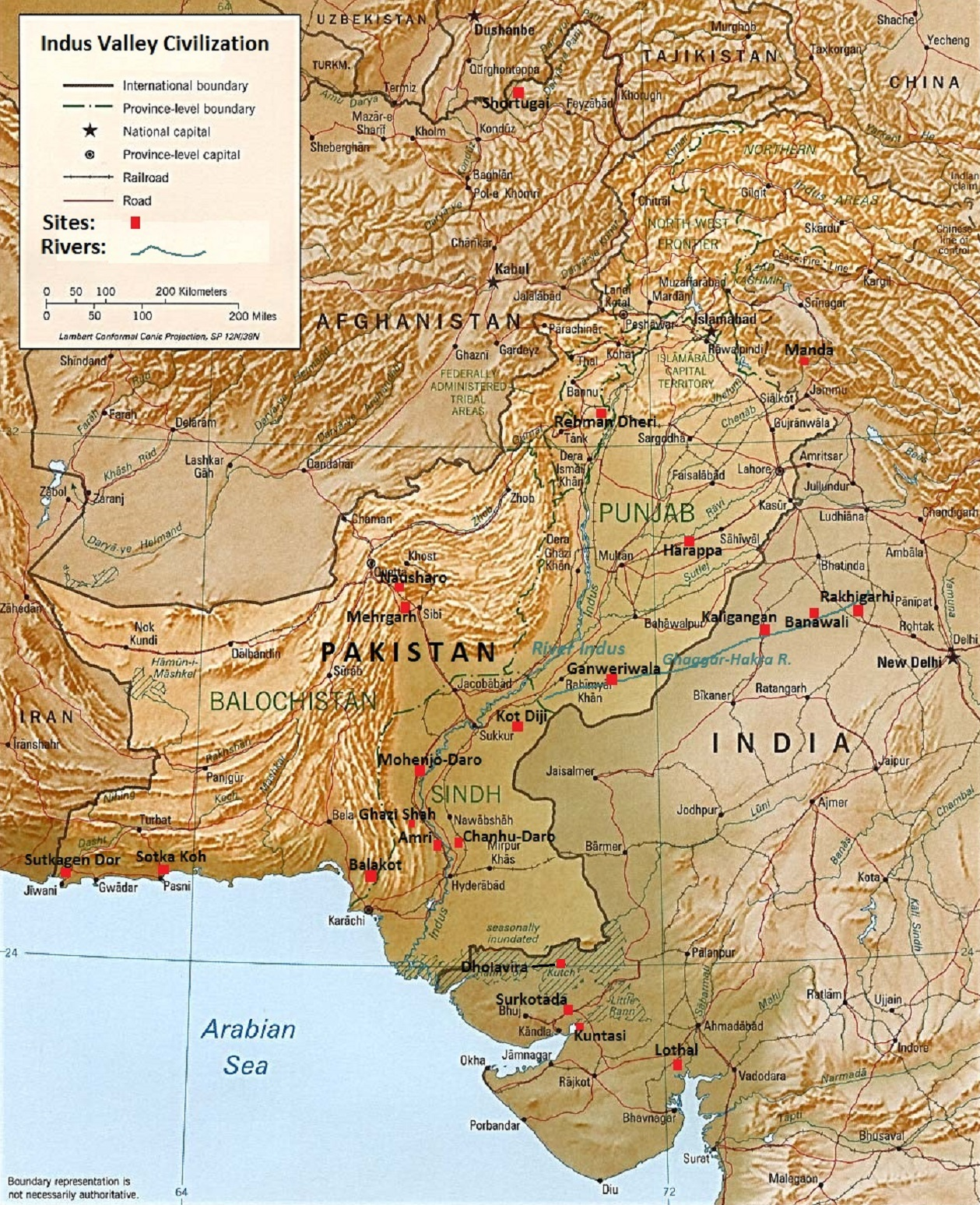
Map showing the sites and extent of the Indus Valley Civilisation. Harappa was the center of one of the core regions of the Indus Valley Civilization, located in central Punjab. The Harappan architecture and Harappan Civilization was one of the most developed in the old Bronze Age.

The Harappan Civilization has its earliest roots in cultures such as that of Mehrgarh, around 5200 BC. The two greatest cities, Mohenjo-daro and Harappa, emerged along the Indus River valley in Punjab and Sindh. The civilization, with a possible writing system, urban centres, drainage infrastructure and diversified social and economic system, was rediscovered in the 1920s also after excavations at Mohenjo-daro in Sindh near Larkana, and Harappan cities, in west Punjab south of Lahore. A number of other sites stretching from the Himalayan foothills in the East Punjab, to Gujarat in the southeast, and Balochistan, Pakistan in the southwest, have also been discovered and studied. The mounds at Harappa were still in good condition when Alexander Cunningham visited in 1853 and 1856, but they were quarried for brick when the railway through Punjab was built in the late 1850s. Cunningham estimated that the ruins had supplied enough brick to provide track ballast for about 100 miles of the Lahore–Multan railway. Despite the damage, the 1926–27 season alone produced 350 seals and inscribed objects.

People first settled at Harappa in the Ravi Phase (Period 1). The excavators originally dated the start of this settlement to about 3300 BC, but a 2025 study puts it as early as about 3700 BC. The first settlement covered an estimated 7 to 10 hectares, with deposits found beneath Mound AB and the north-west corner of Mound E. In the Kot Diji Phase (Period 2, c. 2800–2600 BC), the settlement was enclosed with massive mud-brick walls and platforms. Its inhabitants also laid out broad north–south streets and set aside separate areas for housing and for craft work. By the Harappan Phase (Period 3, c. 2600–1900 BC), the site covered at least 150 hectares, and the 2025 study describes it as a city of between 60,000 and 80,000 people.

Due to falling sea-levels, certain regions were abandoned during the late Harappan period. In its later stages, the Harappan civilization lost features such as writing and hydraulic engineering. As a result, the Ganges Valley settlement gained prominence and Ganges' cities developed.

The earliest sites that are recognisably Harappan date to around 3300 BC. This early phase lasted until around 2600 BC. The mature phase, when the great cities were at their height, lasted from 2600 BC to 1900 BC. From around 1900 BC the civilization slowly declined. This final period, usually called Late Harappan, lasted until about 1300 BC. Harappa itself may never have been completely abandoned.

The idea that invaders destroyed the Harappan cities goes back to the archaeologist Mortimer Wheeler. In his report on the 1946 excavations at Harappa, he cautiously suggested that the fortified strongholds which the Aryans attack in the Rigveda might have belonged to the Harappans. Later excavations at Harappa have found no evidence of an invasion or of the settlement being destroyed. In the Late Harappan levels, some crafts carried on, including faience making and some pottery techniques. Seals, weights, and writing, however, went out of use. A study of skeletons from Harappa's cemeteries found that the people of the Indus Valley remained biologically continuous from about 4500 BC to about 800 BC, with a break only after that date. The evidence strongly points to natural causes. A number of studies show that the area which is today the Thar Desert was once far wetter and that the climate gradually became drier.

=== Discovery and excavation ===
Charles Masson visited in 1826 and was the first European to report on the ruins, with Alexander Burnes following in 1831. In 1872–73, Cunningham carried out a small excavation where he published a plan of the mounds and a stone seal owned by a Major Clark. The seal showed a bull and six written characters that Cunningham could not read. Because the bull had no hump and the characters were not Indian letters, he concluded that the seal came from outside India. Two more seals were acquired at Harappa in the 1880s. The unread script kept scholars interested in the site, but 48 years passed between Cunningham's report and the next excavation.

Daya Ram Sahni began the first large-scale excavation in January 1921. He cut a trench 500 feet (152 m) long across Mound F, dug on Mound AB, and found two more seals. Madho Sarup Vats led the work from 1926–27 to 1933–34. He extended it to a later burial ground, Cemetery H, and to Areas G and J. A building with parallel walls was uncovered on Mound F, which John Marshall identified it as a storehouse because it resembled the storerooms of palaces on Crete. It became known as the "granary". In 1940, Vats published a two-volume report on the seasons from 1920–21 to 1933–34.

In 1946 Wheeler cut a trench through the mud-brick walls around Mound AB, which he interpreted as the defences of a citadel. He also dug a trench linking Cemetery R-37 with Cemetery H, which showed that Cemetery H was the later of the two. Pottery found beneath the walls was later recognised as being of Kot Diji type. M. R. Mughal excavated Cemetery R-37 again for one season in 1966.

Excavation resumed in 1986 under the Harappa Project of the University of California, Berkeley, working with Pakistan's Department of Archaeology. George F. Dales directed the project, with Jonathan Mark Kenoyer as co-director. The first five seasons, from 1986 to 1990, concentrated on Cemetery R-37 and on Mounds AB and E. Fieldwork continued until 2010. By 1991, Harappa had seen at least 26 seasons of work, counting short campaigns—more than any other site of the civilization.

== Culture and economy ==
The Indus Valley civilization was basically an urban culture sustained by surplus agricultural production and commerce, the latter including trade with Elam and Sumer. Both Mohenjo-daro and Harappa are generally characterised as having "differentiated living quarters, flat-roofed brick houses, and fortified administrative or religious centers." Although such similarities have given rise to arguments for the existence of a standardised system of urban layout and planning, the similarities are largely due to the presence of a semi-orthogonal type of civic layout, and a comparison of the layouts of Mohenjo-Daro and Harappa shows that they are in fact, arranged in a quite dissimilar fashion.

The weights and measures of the Indus Valley Civilisation, on the other hand, were highly standardised, and conformed to a set scale of gradations. Distinctive seals were used, among other applications, perhaps for the identification of property and shipment of goods. Although copper and bronze were in use, iron was not yet employed. "Cotton was woven and dyed for clothing; wheat, rice, and a variety of vegetables and fruits were cultivated; and a number of animals, including the humped bull, was domesticated," as well as "fowl for fighting". Wheel-made pottery—some of it adorned with animal and geometric motifs—has been found in profusion at all the major Indus sites. A centralised administration for each city, though not the whole civilisation, has been inferred from the revealed cultural uniformity; however, it remains uncertain whether authority lay with a commercial oligarchy. Harappans had many trade routes along the Indus River that went as far as the Persian Gulf, Mesopotamia, and Egypt. Some of the most valuable things traded were carnelian and lapis lazuli.

Evidence from Harappan skeletal remains shows elevated rates of injury (15.5%), particularly in contexts associated with the later phases of the civilization. Examinations of Harappan skeletons have often found wounds that are likely to have been inflicted in battle. Paleopathological analysis demonstrated that leprosy and tuberculosis were present at Harappa, with the highest prevalence of both disease and trauma present in the skeletons from Area G (an ossuary located south-east of the city walls). The increase in craniofacial trauma and infection appears to coincide with the period of societal decline, suggesting that these signs of violence and disease largely emerged after the onset of collapse, potentially reflecting post-collapse social stress, resource scarcity, and exclusion from access to basic health and safety resources.

== Trade ==
The Harappans traded with ancient Mesopotamia and Elam, among other areas. Cotton textiles and agricultural products were the primary trading objects. Harappan merchants also had procurement colonies in Mesopotamia, which served as trading centres. They traded extensively with people living in southern India, near modern-day Karnataka, to procure gold and copper from them.

Long-distance trade at Harappa is older than the city itself. In the Ravi Phase levels, excavators found unfinished bangles made of sea shell, showing that raw shell was carried inland from the Makran or Kutch coast. The same levels held copper tools and beads of lapis lazuli, carnelian, agate, and amazonite. From these finds, the excavators inferred that trade networks linked the settlement with the southern coast, with agate and amazonite sources in Gujarat and Rajasthan, lapis lazuli sources in Baluchistan and Afghanistan, and copper sources in Baluchistan or Rajasthan. This mix of long-distance trade and local manufacturing continued through the Kot Diji Phase, which the excavators saw as the foundation of the later Harappan economy. In his 1991 report, Kenoyer theorized that Harappa's location helped its early settlement grow because it stood at a crossroads between the western highlands and northern plains, and the Ghaggar-Hakra valley and southern plains.

The trade routes of Indus valley covered vast routes extending from India to Egypt. The trade relations are assumed to be much older and followed till very late. Trade and Trade Routes

== Archaeology ==
=== Significance ===
Harappa is the type site of the Bronze Age Indus Valley Civilisation ("IVC"), as it was the first IVC site to be excavated by the Archaeological Survey of India during the British Raj, although its significance did not become manifest until the discovery of Mohenjo-daro in Sindh, Pakistan, some years later. (Note: Habib: "Harappa, in Sahiwal district of west Punjab, Pakistan, had long been known to archaeologists as an extensive site on the Ravi river, but its true significance as a major city of an early great civilization remained unrecognized until the discovery of Mohenjo-daro near the banks of the Indus, in the Larkana district of Sindh, by Rakhaldas Banerji in 1922. Sir John Marshall, then Director General of the Archaeological Survey of India, used the term 'Indus civilization' for the culture discovered at Harappa and Mohenjo-daro, a term doubly apt because of the geographical context implied in the name 'Indus' and the presence of cities implied in the word 'civilization'.) For this reason, IVC is sometimes called the "Harappan civilisation," a term more commonly used by the Archaeological Survey of India after decolonization in 1947. (Note: Habib: "Others, notably the Archaeological Survey of India after Independence, have preferred to call it 'Harappan', or 'Mature Harappan', taking Harappa to be its type-site.") The discovery of Harappa and, soon afterwards, Mohenjo-Daro, two major urban IVC settlements, was the culmination of work that had begun after the founding of the Archaeological Survey of India in 1861.

The Harappan-phase cemetery known as Cemetery R-37 was discovered in 1937–38 by K. N. Sastri, who excavated it with H. K. Bose over the course of four seasons, ending 1940–41. In his 1991 report, Gregory Possehl noted that the roughly fifty Harappan burials they found had never been published.

=== Chronology ===
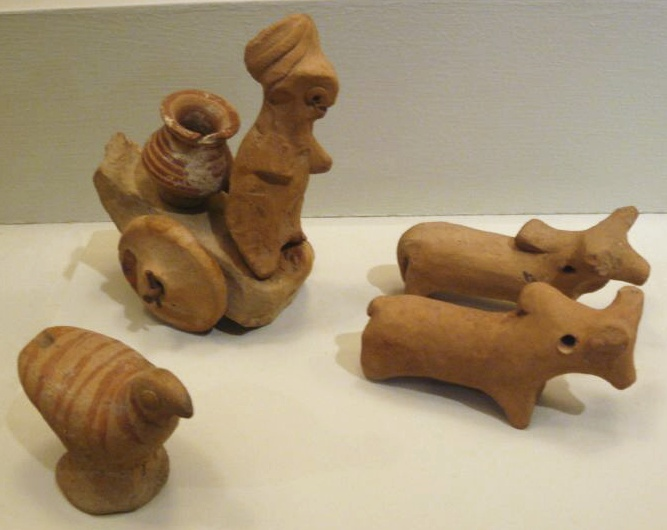
Miniature votive figurines or toy models from Harappa, around 2500 BC. Hand-modeled terra-cotta figurines with polychromy.

The excavators of the site have proposed the following chronology of Harappa's occupation:

1. Ravi Aspect of the Hakra phase, c. 3300 – c. 2800 BC
2. Kot Dijian (Early Harappan) phase, c. 2800 – c. 2600 BC
3. Harappan Phase, c. 2600 – c. 1900 BC
4. Transitional Phase, c. 1900 – c. 1800 BC
5. Late Harappan Phase, c. 1800 – c. 1300 BC

Period 1 occupation was thought to be around 7 to 10 hectares, but following excavations and findings of pottery in Mound E, along with previously found Mound AB pottery, suggest Ravi/Hakra phase would have been extended, together in both mounds, to 25 hectares.

Period 2, Kot Diji phase, was extended in the same two mounds, AB and E, covering over 27 hectares.

In Period 3, Harappa phase, the settlement reached 150 hectares.

By far the most exquisite and obscure artefacts unearthed to date are the small, square steatite (soapstone) seals engraved with human or animal motifs. A large number of seals have been found at such sites as Mohenjo-Daro and Harappa. Many bear pictographic inscriptions generally thought to be a form of writing or script. Despite the efforts of philologists from all parts of the world and the use of modern cryptographic analysis, the signs remain undeciphered. It is also unknown if they reflect proto-Dravidian or other non-Vedic language(s). The ascribing of Indus Valley Civilisation iconography and epigraphy to historically known cultures is extremely problematic, in part due to the rather tenuous archaeological evidence for such claims, as well as the projection of modern South Asian political concerns onto the archaeological record of the area.

The area of the late Harappan period consisted of the areas of the Daimabad, Maharashtra, and Badakshan regions of Afghanistan. The area covered by this civilisation would have been very large with a distance of around 2,400 kilometres (1,500 mi).

== Symbols similar to the Indus script ==
Clay and stone tablets unearthed at Harappa, which were carbon-dated 3300–3200 BC, contain trident-shaped and plant-like markings. "It is a big question as to if we can call what we have found true writing, but we have found symbols that have similarities to what became Indus script", said Dr. Richard Meadow of Harvard University, Director of the Harappa Archeological Research Project. These primitive symbols are placed slightly earlier than the primitive writing of the Sumerians of Mesopotamia, dated c.3100 BC. These markings have similarities to what later became Indus Script which has not been completely deciphered yet.

In February 2006, a school teacher in the village of Sembian-Kandiyur in Tamil Nadu, discovered a stone celt (tool) with an inscription estimated to be up to 3,500 years old. Indian epigraphist Iravatham Mahadevan postulated that the four signs were in the Indus script and called the find "the greatest archaeological discovery of a century in Tamil Nadu". Based on this evidence, he went on to suggest that the language used in the Indus Valley was of Dravidian origin. However, the absence of a Bronze Age in South India, contrasted with the knowledge of bronze making techniques in the Indus Valley cultures, calls into question the validity of this hypothesis.

== Dating ==
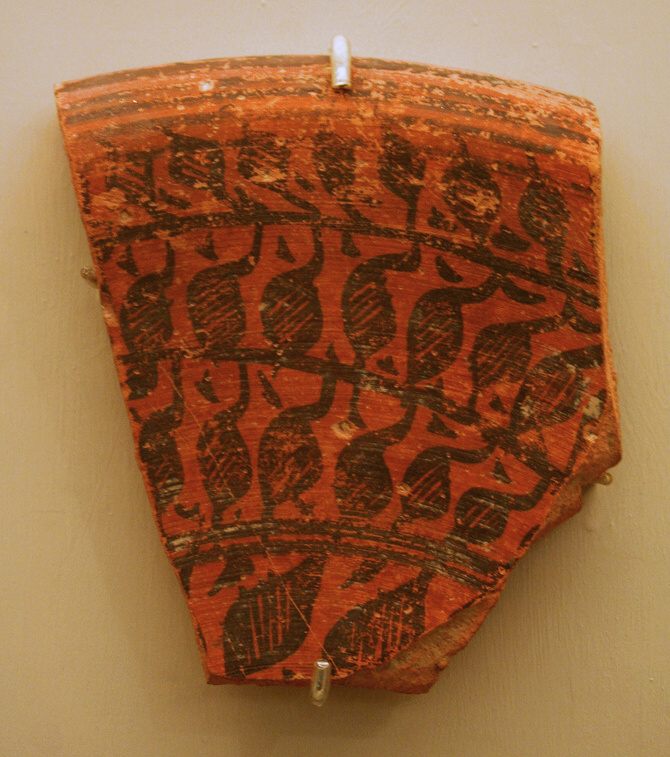
Harappa. Fragment of Large Deep Vessel, around 2500 BC. Red pottery with red and black slip-painted decoration, 4 15/16 × 6 1/8 in. (12.5 × 15.5 cm). Brooklyn Museum.

Statuettes from Harappa
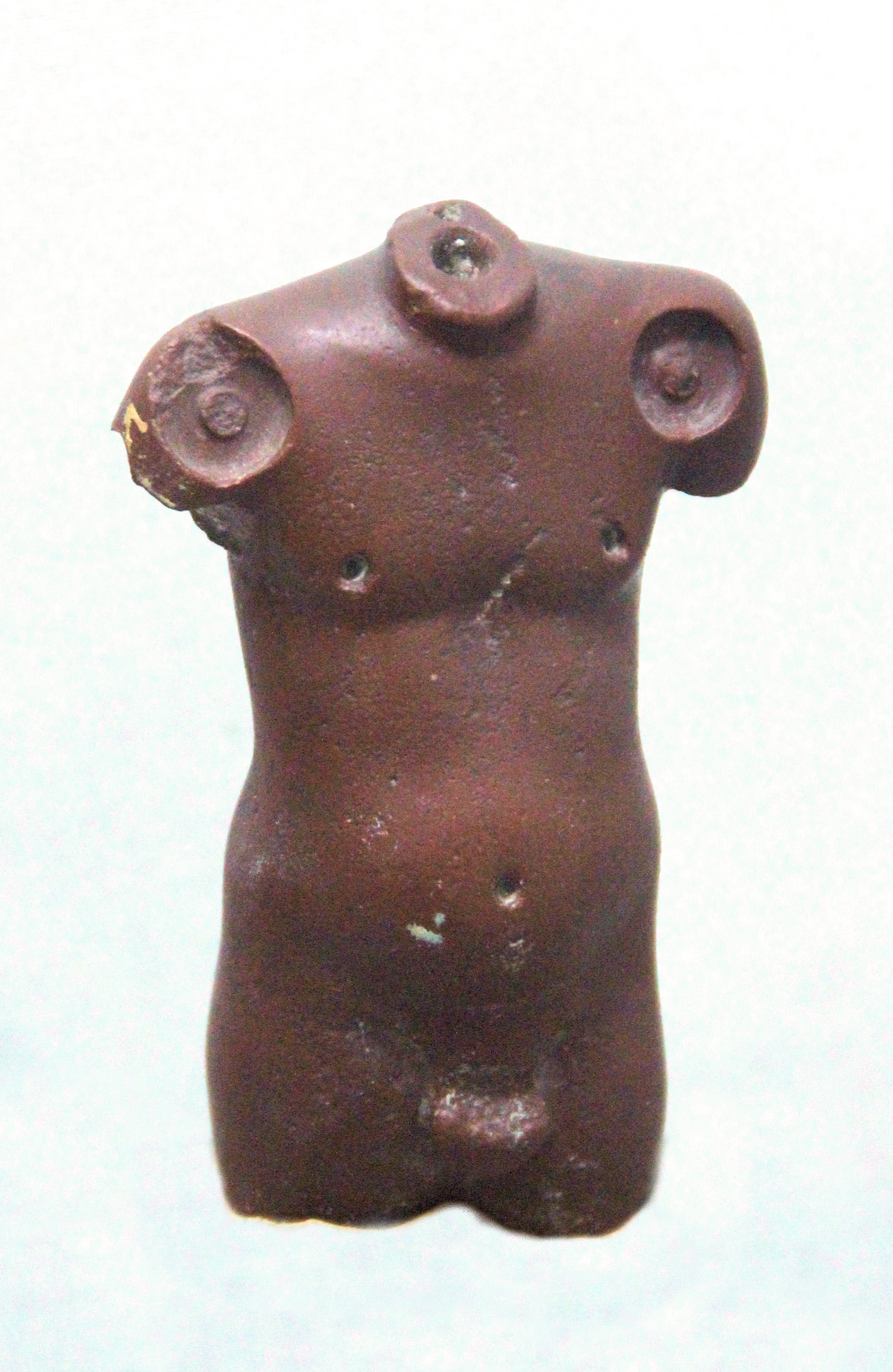
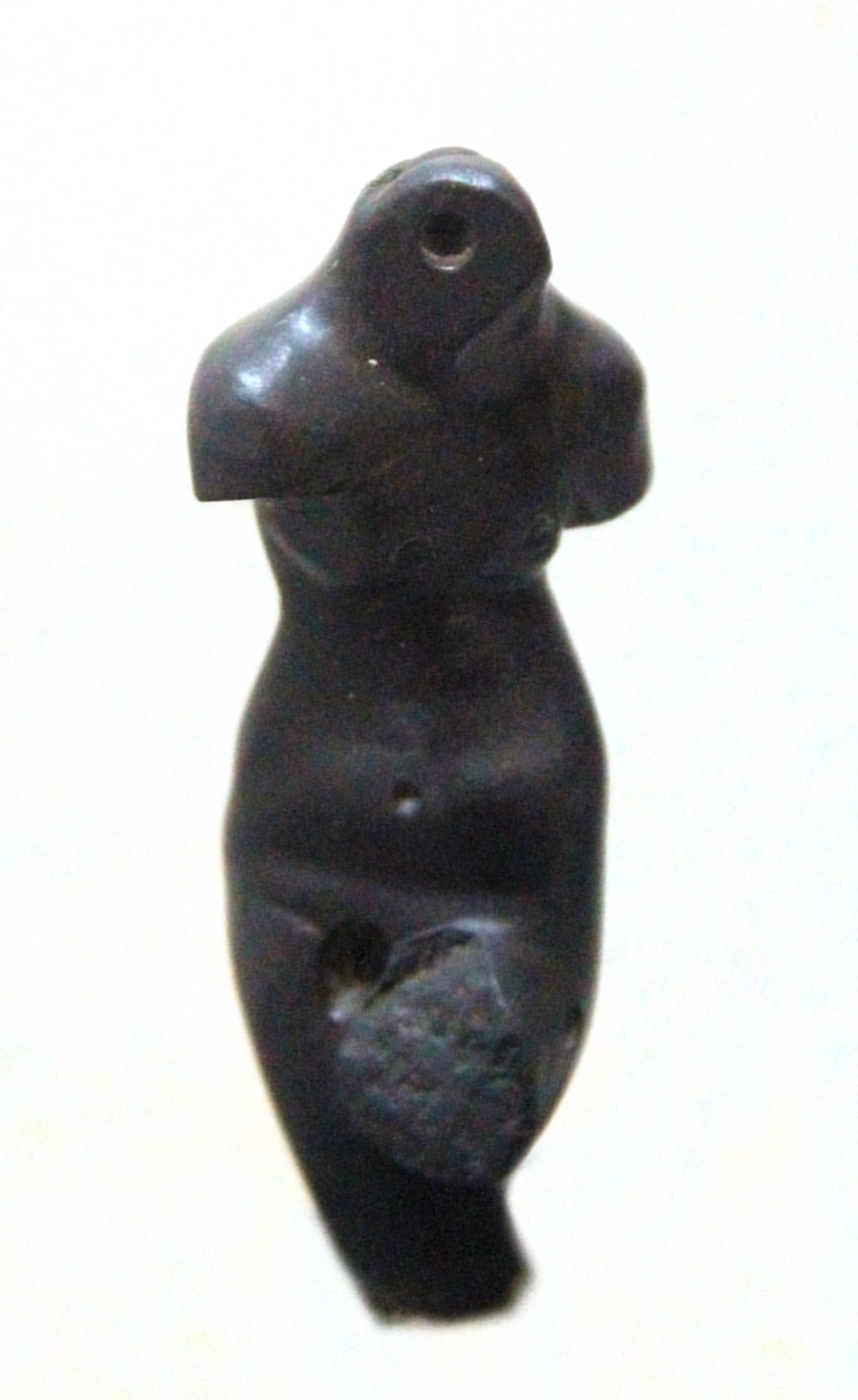
The controversial Harappa male torso (left). The discoverer, Madho Sarup Vats, claimed a Harappan date, but Marshall dated the statuette to the Gupta period. Another famous statuette from the site is the Harappa grey stone male dancer (right).
- The earliest radiocarbon dating mentioned on the web is 2725±185 BC (uncalibrated) or 3338, 3213, 3203 BC calibrated, giving a midpoint of 3251 BC. Kenoyer, Jonathan Mark (1991) Urban process in the Indus Tradition: A preliminary report. In Harappa Excavations, 1986–1990: A multidisciplinary approach to Second Millennium urbanism, edited by Richard H. Meadow: 29–59. Monographs in World Archaeology No.3. Prehistory Press, Madison Wisconsin.
- Periods 4 and 5 are not dated at Harappa. The termination of the Harappan tradition at Harappa falls between 1900 and 1500 BC.
- Mohenjo-daro is another major city of the same period, located in Sindh province of Pakistan. One of its most well-known structures is the Great Bath of Mohenjo-Daro.

== See also ==
- Charles Masson – First European explorer of Harappa
- Harappa Museum
- Mehrgarh
- Ganeriwala
- Dholavira
- Lothal
- Mandi, Uttar Pradesh
- Sheri Khan Tarakai
- Sokhta Koh
- Kalibangan
- Rakhigarhi
- Taxila

== Bibliography ==
- Habib, Irfan (2015). The Indus Civilization. Tulika Books. ISBN 978-93-82381-53-2.
- Wright, Rita P. (2009). The Ancient Indus: Urbanism, Economy, and Society. Cambridge University Press. ISBN 978-0-521-57219-4.
