= Andhra Pradesh Department of Archeology and Museums =

Department of the government of Andhra Pradesh

Government department overview
- Type: Tourism
- Jurisdiction: Andhra Pradesh, India
- Headquarters: Vijaywada, Andhra Pradesh, India
- Government department executive: Muttamsetti Srinivasa Rao, Director
- Parent department: Department of Tourism, Government of Andhra Pradesh
- Website: aparchmuseums.nic.in

The Andhra Pradesh State Department of Archaeology and Museums is a department of the Government of Andhra Pradesh which oversees archaeological exploration and maintenance of heritage sites and museums in the Indian state of Andhra Pradesh. It was established in the year 1914 under the stewardship of Dr. Ghulam Yazdani. As a result of formation of A. P. State in 1956, the Department of Archaeology and Museums, Hyderabad was expanded and it became known as Andhra Pradesh Department of Archaeology and Museums in the year 1960. When the state of Telangana was formed in 2014, the department was separated into two; leading to disputes between the two newly formed departments over historical artifacts.

== Museums ==
Andhra Pradesh Department of Archaeology and Museums has 13 museums across the state.

Museums owned by "Department of Archaeology and Museums" in Andhra Pradesh

- Visakhapatnam Coastal Archaeological Govt. Museum, Visakhapatnam
- Andhra Sahitya Parishad Govt. Museum and Research Institute, Kakinada
- Sri Rallabandi Subbarao Archaeological Govt. Museum, Rajahmundry
- Bapu Museum, Vijayawada
- Baudhasree Archaeological Museum, Guntur
- Kalachakra Museum, Amaravati
- District Archaeological Site Museum, Chandavaram, Prakasam District
- Sri Tanguturi Prakasam Panthulu Memorial Government Site Museum, Kanaparthi, Prakasam District
- District Archaeological Museum, Nellore
- Bhagwan Mahavir Government Museum, Kadapa
- Dam Site Museum, Mylavaram, Kadapa district.
- District Archaeological Museum, Kurnool
- Padmasree Kalluri Subba Rao Archaeological Museum, Ananthapuram

== See also ==
- {{Map of museums in Andhra Pradesh}}
- Archaeological Survey of India
- Amaravathi Mahachaitya
- Culture of Hyderabad
