= List of museums in Andhra Pradesh =

Select list of notable museums in Andhra Pradesh dedicated to archaeological, art and craft, ethnographic, defence and science or multiple purposes is given below.

Type	Name	City/Town	Year Established	Ownership
Archaeological	Archaeological site museum	Amaravati	1951	Central
Archaeological	Archaeological site museum	Chandragiri, Chittoor district	1988	Central
Archaeological	Archaeological site museum	Nagarjunakonda, Palnadu district	1966	Central
Archaeological	Victoria Jubilee Museum, Bapu Museum	Vijayawada	1887	State
Archaeological	Kalluri Subba Rao district archaeological museum	Anantapur	1992	State
Archaeological	Archaeological site museum	Chandavaram, Prakasam district	1980	State
Archaeological	Bhagwan Mahavir Government Museum	Kadapa	1982	State
Archaeological	Baudhasree State Archaeological museum	Guntur	1992	State
Archaeological	ASP Govervement Museum and Research Institute	Kakinada	1973	State
Archaeological	District Archaeological Museum	Kurnool	1999	State
Archaeological	Archaeological site museum	Mylavaram dam, Jammalamadugu, Kadapa district	1981	State
Archaeological	Sri Rallabandi Subbarao Government Museum	Rajahmundry, Godavari bund road	1967	State
Archaeological	Archaeological site museum	Kanuparthi, Prakasam district	1983	State
Archaeological	Archaeological site museum	Nellore	2006	State
Archaeological	Kalachakra museum	Amaravathi, Palnadu district	2006	State
Art and craft	Sri Venkateswara Museum on Temple Art	Tirupati	1983	State
Ethnographic	Telugu Saamskruthika Niketanam	Visakhapatnam	2015	State
Art and craft	Damerla Ramarao Art Gallery	Rajahmundry	NA	State
Defence	Victory at Sea War memorial	Visakhapatnam	1971	Central
Defence	Kursura Submarine Museum	Visakhapatnam	2002	Central
Defence	TU 142 Aircraft Museum	Visakhapatnam	2017	Central
Ethnographic	Tribal Museum	Araku Valley	1996	State
Ethnographic	Chenchu Lakshmi Tribal Museum	Srisailam	NA	State
Multipurpose	Visakha Museum	Visakhapatnam	1991	State
Science	Regional Science Center	Tirupati	1993	Central
Science	APCOST Regional Science Center	Vijayawada	NA	State
Science	Anantapur District Science Museum	Anantapur	NA	State
