= Madho Sarup Vats =

Indian archaeologist (1896 – 1955)

Pandit Madho Sarup Vats (12 April 1896 – 7 December 1955) was an Indian archaeologist and Sanskrit scholar who served as the Director-General of the Archaeological Survey of India (ASI) from 1950 to 1954. Pandit Vats is especially well known for his participation in the excavations at Mohenjodaro which he supervised from 1924.

== Early life ==
Vats was born in Punjab in a Gaur Brahmin family on 12 April 1896. He graduated in Sanskrit from Punjab University, Lahore and began his career in 1918 with the Patna Museum where he was tasked with preparing estampages of inscriptions. In April 1920, Vats joined the Archaeological Survey of India.

== Archaeological Survey of India ==
In March 1920, Vats joined the Archaeological Survey of India with a Sanskrit scholarship and was deputed to officiate as Assistant Superintendent of Western Circle in 1923 when Assistant Superintendent G. C. Chandra was the acting Superintendent in the absence of Rakhaldas Banerjee. Vats began his term by deciphering newly discovered inscriptions at a Chaitya cave in Karle, he published the inscriptions in the Epigraphia Indica. But soon afterwards, Vats diverted his attention to Mohenjodaro as the excavations there had been left incomplete. He was a part of a team led by John Marshall, the other members on the team were K. N. Dikshit and Harold Hargreaves. He also published frequently in the Epigraphia Indica. A few choice publications are one on grants by the king Dhruvasena I of the Maitraka dynasty, and one on grants by Prithvichandra Bhogashakti (a feudatory of Harishchandra).

In 1925, Vats was promoted to Superintendent of Northern Circle and he supervised the excavations at Harappa till 1934-35. Shortly after his retirement, Vats published the results of the excavations.

== Works ==
- Excavations at Harappa: ... an Account of Archaeological Excavations at Harappa Carried Out Between the Years 1920-21 and 1933-34, 2 Vols. New Delhi: Munshiram Manoharlal (2013 reprint). ISBN 978-8121508100.
- The Gupta Temple At Deogarh. Memoirs of the Archaeological Survey of India Series, no. 70. Delhi: Manager of Publications (1952). OCLC 621252.
- Repairs at Agra and Fatehpur Sikri: 1944-49. Ancient India (5): January 1950.
- Central Asian Fragments of the Ashtādaśasāhasrikā Prajñāpramitā and of an Unidentified Text. Delhi: Manager of Publications (1942). Co-authors: Sten Konow (ed.), A. Aiyappan, B.C. Law, T. N. Ramachandran, Frank Manley. OCLC 31467645.
- Cruciform Indo-Aryan Śikhara Temples at Dudhai, District Jhansi, and Similar Shrines Elsewhere in India. 1943. OCLC 470090114.
- The temple of Visnu at Bishenpur and later temples of Manipur. Vishveshvaranand Vedic Research Institute: 1954. OCLC 1121044686.
- Sohnag Terracotta Seal of Avantivarman. Proceedings of the Indian History Congress. Vol. 9 (1946). JSTOR 44137039.

Preceded by N. P. Chakravarti	Director General of the Archaeological Survey of India; 1950 - 1953	Succeeded by Amalananda Ghosh
