= B. Ch. Chhabra =

Indian epigraphist (1908-?)

Bahadur Chand Chhabra (born 3 April 1908), also known as B. Ch. Chhabra, was an Indian Sanskritist and epigraphist who served as the Assistant and Joint Director General of the Archaeological Survey of India (ASI).

== Early life and education ==
Chhabra was born at Kohat near Peshawar in the then North-West Frontier Province (NWFP) of British India on 3 April 1908. Chhabra graduated from the Punjab University, Lahore. He earned his doctorate from the State University of Leiden in 1934. In the early 1930s, he joined the Archaeological Survey of India as an epigraphist under J. Ph. Vogel. He was married to Sushila Batra, with whom he had a son, Vinny, and two daughters.

== Career at ASI ==
Chhabra succeeded Vogel as the Chief Epigraphist in 1935 and served until 1953. In 1953, he became the Assistant Director General and then, the Joint Director General of the Archaeological Survey of India. Chhabra retired from the ASI in 1966.

== Works ==
- Puṣpahāsa (Sanskrit poetry). First published in 1908.
- Diplomatics of Sanskrit Copper plate Grants. National Archives of India: 1961.
- Antiquities of Chamba State: Medieval and Later Inscriptions, Part 2. Delhi: Manager of Publications (1957).
- Chhabra, Bahadur Chand; Goyala, Śrīrāma; Agrawala, Prithvi Kumar; Chhabra, B. Ch, eds. (1992). Reappraising Gupta history for S.R. Goyal (1st ed.). New Delhi: Aditya Prakashan. ISBN 9788185179780.
- Antiquities of Chamba State: Part 1, Inscriptions of the Pre-Mohammedan Period. With Jean Philippe Vogel. Delhi: Archaeological Survey of India (1994).
- Facets of Aryan culture. Delhi: Sundeep Prakashan (1988). ISBN 9788185067117.
- Findings in Indian archaeology. Delhi: Sundeep Prakashan (1991). ISBN 9788185067766.
- Abhilekhasaṅgrahaḥ: An anthology of Sanskrit inscriptions - Volume 6. Delhi: Sahitya Akademi (1964).
- Expansion of Indo-Aryan Culture during Pallava Rule. 1934.
- Catalogue of the Gupta Gold Coins of the Bayana Hoard in the National Museum. Delhi: National Museum of India (1986).
- ABC of Christianity. With Bernard Joesph. Delhi: Ashoka Maurya and Pallava Historical Trust (1977).
- Inscriptions of Early Gupta Kings. With G. S. Gai, D.R. Bhandarkar, John Faithfull Fleet. Delhi: Archaeological Survey of India (1981).
- Bhojacaritra: Am̐garezī prastāvanā, noṭsa tathā pariśiṣṭa sahita. With S Sankaranarayana. Delhi: Bhāratīya Jñānapīṭha Prakāśana (1964).
- Ajanta: the colour and monochrome reproductions of the Ajanta Frescoes based on photography. With John Allan, Laurence Binyon, Ghulam Yazdani, N. P. Chakravarti.

Contributed to: Corpus Inscriptionum Indicarum, Epigraphia Indica
