= Chanderi Inscription of ʽAlāʼ al-Dīn Khaljī =

Epigraphic record in the Persian language

The Chanderi Inscription of ʽAlāʼ al-Dīn Khaljī is an epigraphic record in four lines, written in Naskh script in the Persian language. It records the completion of a mosque during the governorship of Amīr al-Umarā', Ikhtiyār al-Dawla wa al-Dīn Tamur Sulṭānī by Ismā‘īl, son of ‘Abd al-Salām, entitled Wajīh-i Najīb, the muḥarrir of the district (khiṭṭa) of Kol (Aligarh) during the reign of ‘Alā' al-Dunyā wa al-Dīn Abu al-Muẓaffar Muḥammad Shāh (i.e. ‘Alā' al-Dīn Khaljī, popularly known as Alauddin Khalji, d. 1316 AD).

== Date and importance ==
The inscription is dated 20 Sha'ban 711 A.H. on the Islamic calendar, a date that corresponds to 10 December 1311 C.E. making it the oldest-known Islamic inscription from Chanderi.

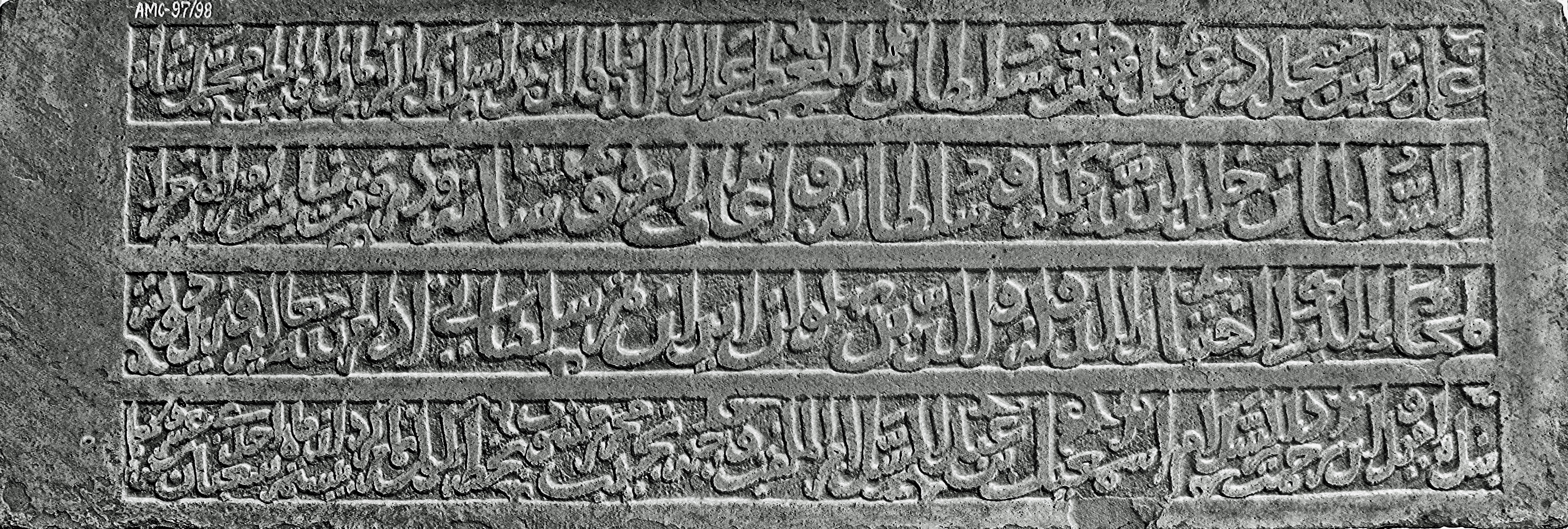
Chanderi Inscription of ‘Alā' al-Dīn Khaljī, dated Friday 31 December 1311 C.E.

== Publication ==
The inscription was first mentioned in 1924-25 by M. B. Garde in the annual reports of the Gwalior State archaeological department. Later it was published in Indian Historical Quarterly, and listed in the Annual Report on Indian Epigraphy. An edition appeared in the 1968 volume of Epigraphia Indica, Persian and Arabic Supplement. The inscription was later listed in a volume by M. Willis.

== Location ==
The inscription, lost for a number of years, was located by Muzaffar Ansari who donated it to the Archaeological Museum, Chanderi, where it is registered under the number AMC 97/98. The museum is under the supervision of the Archaeological Survey of India.
