= Kankjol =

Village in Sahebganj

- Village
- Location within Jharkhand Location within India
- Country: India
- State: Jharkhand
- District: Sahibganj
- Block: Barharwa

Area
  - Total: 1.43 km^{2} (0.55 sq mi)

Population (2011)
  - Total: 2,501
  - Density: 1,750/km^{2} (4,530/sq mi)

Languages
- Time zone: UTC+5:30 (IST)

Kankjol is a village in Barharwa block of Sahibganj district, Jharkhand. An old town dating back at least to the 1100s, Kankjol was a provincial capital under the Sena dynasty and later was the seat of a pargana under the Mughal Empire. As of 2011, it has a population of 2,501 people, in 514 households.

== History ==
Hiranand Sastri, Kashinath Narayan Dikshit, and N. P. Chakravarti identified Kankjol with Kaṅkagrāma, eponymous capital of the Kaṅkagrāmabhukti division of the Sena dynasty. This bhukti (province) is first attested c. 1183 in the Shaktipur grant of Lakshmanasena. The grant states that Uttara Rāḍhā, (what is now the northern Rarh region), was part of Kaṅkagrāmabhukti According to Dhirendra Chandra Ganguly, the province seems to have been a recent creation at that point, likely reflecting recent conquests under Lakshmanasena. Uttara Rāḍhā (what is now the northern Rarh region), mentioned as part of the Vardhamāna bhukti just a few years prior, is mentioned in the Shaktipur grant as part of Kaṅkagrāmabhukti; it seems to have formed the southern part of the new province, with the Ajay River marking the boundary between the Kaṅkagrāma and Vardhamāna provinces. Kaṅkagrāmabhukti also seems to have encompassed the present-day Santhal Pargana division and Bhagalpur district in the northwest.

John Beames identified Kānjkol with the "Kánakjok" of the Ain-i Akbari, which is listed as a mahal in sarkar Tanda. This mahal was listed with an assessed revenue of 1,589,332 dams. According to Irfan Habib, the mahal of Kānkjol must have covered a "very large" area. Its area was increased even further under the Nawabs of Bengal in the 1700s, when several parganas (including Rajmahal) were merged into its territory. As a result, the pargana of Kānkjol came to occupy a vast territory stretching downstream from Purnia along both sides of the Ganges.

== Demographics ==
According to the 2011 Census of India, Kankjol had a population of 2,501 people, in 514 households. The population was 49.9% male (1,247) and 51.1% female (1,254). There were 547 children between the ages 0–6 in the village, or 21.2% of the total population.
