= Z. A. Desai =

Indian epigraphist

Z.A. Desai
- Born: 18 May 1925; Dhandhuka, Gujarat
- Died: 24 March 2002 (aged 76)
- Education: Bombay University, Tehran University

Ziauddin Abdul Hayy Desai (18 May 1925 – 24 March 2002) was an Indian epigraphist associated with the Archaeological Survey of India (ASI). He was also a noted architectural historian and a literary scholar of the Indo-Persianate world as evidenced in his writings.

== Life ==
Ziauddin Desai was born on 18 May 1925 at Dhandhuka, Gujarat. He graduated in 1946 B.A.First Class First, Bombay University, MA in 1948 First Class First, Bombay University, in 1948. Chancellor's Medallist, Jaffer Cassum Moosa Medallist, Rustomjee Modi Prizeman. During 1947–1953, he taught Persian as a lecturer. In 1953, he joined the ASI as an Assistant Superintending Epigraphist. In 1959, he obtained a D.Litt in Persian from the Tehran University. Subsequently, in 1961, he became the Superintending Epigraphist at ASI following Ghulam Yazdani.

From 1953 to 1976, Desai edited the Arabic and Persian Supplement to the Epigraphia Indica. From 1977 until his retirement in 1983, Desai served as the Director of Epigraphy at ASI.

Desai's research interests included Indo-Persian literature, Indo-Muslim epigraphy, numismatics, architectural history and the history of his home province of Gujarat. His honours and distinctions include the President of India's Award for outstanding services to Persian Language and Literature (1983). Apart from editing the Arabic and Persian supplement to the Epigraphia Indica, he published more than a dozen books and around 300 articles. With Wayne E. Begley, he was joint editor and chief consultant on Persian sources of the 'History of Shah Jahan Project'. He was also chairman of the Board of Editors of the Descriptive Catalogue of Arabic, Persian and Urdu Manuscripts (in Urdu) at the Dargah Hazrat Pir Muhammad Shah Library, Ahmedabad.

Desai settled in Ahmedabad after his retirement in 1983. There, he died on 24 March 2002 after a prolonged illness.

== Works in English ==
- 'Mir'at-i Sikandari as a Source for the Study of Cultural and Social Conditions of Gujarat under the Sultanate (1403-1572)' in Journal of the Oriental Institute (Baroda), vol. X, 1961, pp. 235–78.
- Muslims in the 13th Century Gujarat, as known from Arabic and Persian Inscriptions, Journal of the Oriental Institute (Baroda), vol. X, 1961, pp. 353–64.
- 'Salari (of Gujarat): A 13th Century Persian Poet of India', Islamic Culture, vol. XXXVI, no. 4, 1962, pp. 275–80.
- 'A'n-Nūru's-Sāfir as a Source for the History of Gujarat', Journal of the Oriental Institute (Baroda), vol. XV, nos. 3–4, 1966, pp. 465–74.
- 'Persian Language in the Pre-Sultanate Inscriptions of Gujarat', Indo-Iranica, vol. XX, no. 3, 1967, pp. 18–32.
- 'A Fifteenth Century Persian Qasida from Gujarat', Indo-Iranica, vol. XXI, no. 4, 1968, pp. 31–5.
- 'Ganj-i Ma^{c}ani of Muti^{c}i', Indo-Iranica, Iran Society Silver Jubilee Souvenir Volume, Calcutta: Iran Society, 1970, pp. 59–78.
- Published Muslim Inscriptions of Rajasthan. Jaipur: Directorate of Archaeology and Museums, Govt. of Rajasthan, 1971.
- Persian and Arabic Epigraphy of Gujarat: Their Historical Significance, Baroda: Department of History, Faculty of Arts, The M.S. University of Baroda, 1982 (Department of History Series, no. 8).
- 'A 17th Century Persian Litterateur and Islamic Scholar of Gujarat', in M.H. Siddiqi, ed., The Growth of Indo-Persian Literature in Gujarat, Baroda: Department of Persian, Arabic & Urdu, The M.S. University of Baroda, 1985, pp. 11–20.
- Corpus of Persian and Arabic Inscriptions in the Museums of Gujarat. Vadodara (Baroda): Director, Department of Museums, Gujarat State, 1985.
- 'The Major Dargahs of Ahmadabad', in Christian W. Troll, ed., Muslim Shrines in India, Delhi: Oxford University Press, 1989, pp. 76–97 (one map and three black and white photographs).
- Taj Mahal : The Illumined Tomb : An Anthology of Seventeenth-Century Mughal and European Documentary Sources [in English]. With Wayne E. Begley. Cambridge, Mass.; Seattle; London: Aga Khan Program for Islamic Architecture : University of Washington Press.
- The Shah Jahan Nama of Inayat Khan, edited and compiled by W.E. Begley and Z.A. Desai, New Delhi: Oxford University Press, 1990.
- Malfuz Literature As A Source of Political, Social and Cultural History of Gujarat and Rajasthan in 15th Century, Patna: Khuda Bakhsh Oriental Public Library, 1991.
- 'The 15th Century Ma'athir-i-Mahmud Shahi Written in Gujarat: Dynastic History, Monographic History or Universal History?', Quarterly Journal of the Pakistan Historical Society, vol. XLVI, July-Sept. 1998, pp. 63–8.
- Arabic, Persian and Urdu Inscriptions of West India: A Topographical List. New Delhi: Sundeep Prakashan, 1999.
- 'Persian Sources of the Social and Cultural History of Medieval Gujarat', in Muzaffar Alam, Françoise 'Nalini' Delvoye and Marc Gaborieau, eds., The Making of Indo-Persian Culture: Indian and French Studies, New Delhi: Manohar and Centre de Sciences Humaines, 2000, pp. 393–405.
- Quest for Truth: A Collection of Research Articles of Dr Z.A. Desai. New Delhi: Munshiram Manoharlal and the Hazrat Pir Mohammed Shah Dargah Sharif Trust, 2004.
- Triumphal Sun: A Collection of Research Articles and Inscriptions of Dr. Ziyauddin Abdul Hayy Desai (1925-2002), edited by M. Bombaywala and M. Abbasi, Ahmedabad: Hazrat Pir Mohammed Shah Library and Research Centre, 2014.
