= Madras Literary Society =

Learned society in India

Madras Literary society
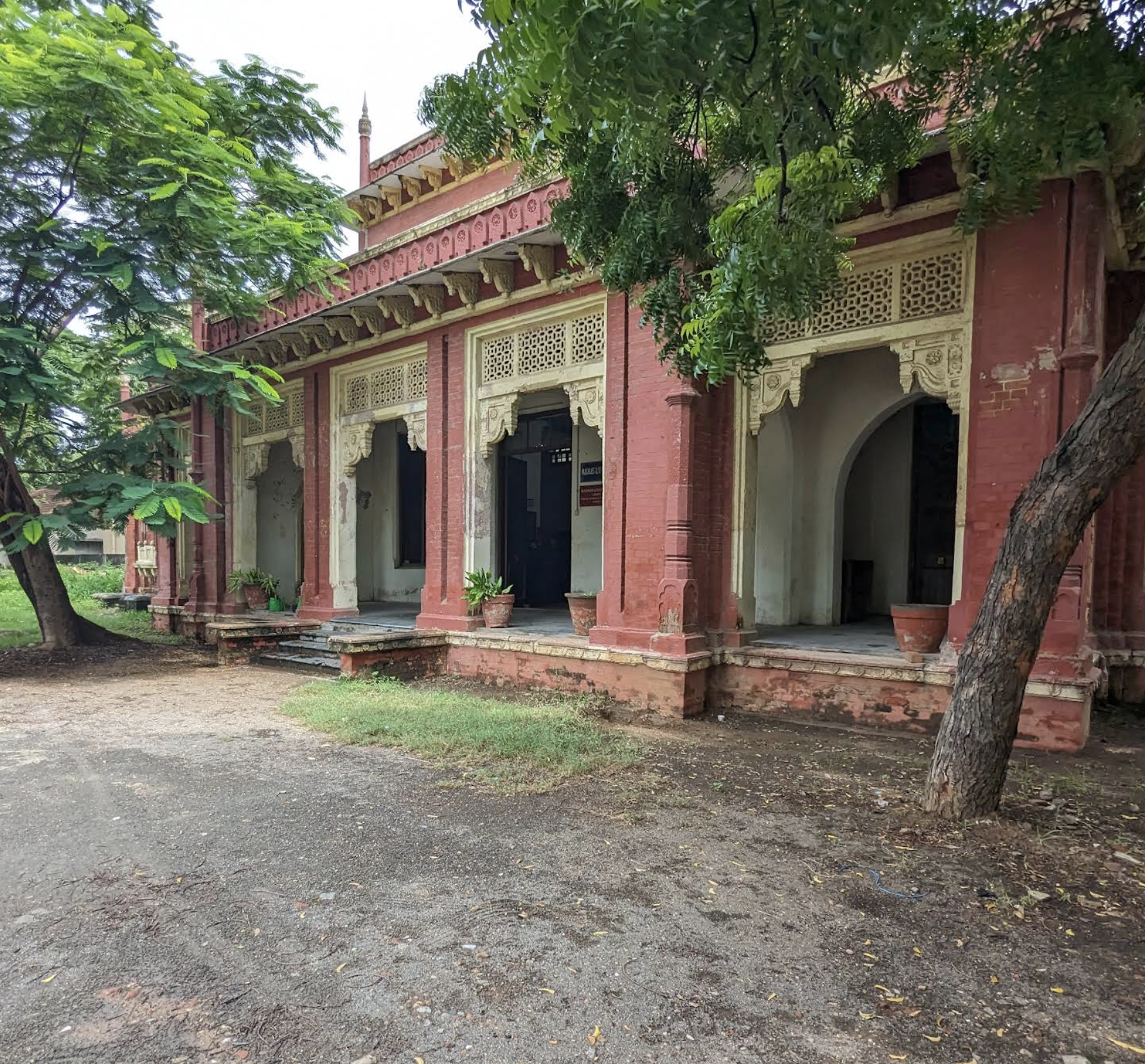
- Library
- Location: Madras (Chennai), Tamil Nadu, India, South India
- Type: Literary society and public library
- Established: 1812 (214 years)

Other information
- Affiliation: Royal Asiatic Society of Great Britain and Ireland

The Madras Literary Society is a learned society in Chennai (earlier called Madras), India which was founded in 1817 and in 1830 became associated with the Royal Asiatic Society of Great Britain and Ireland. It was founded by Sir John Henry Newbolt, then Chief Justice of Madras, with Benjamin Guy Babington as the founder secretary. The Society produced a journal called the Transactions of the Literary Society of Madras and from 1833 under the name of [Madras] Journal of Literature and Science. Most of the early members were Europeans and the first Indian to be admitted was Kavali Lakshmayya who worked with Colin Mackenzie. The journal ceased publication in 1894. It is the oldest surviving literary society and lending library in South India.

Madras Literary society insignia.

The journal published extensive research on geology, meteorology, fauna, flora, culture, and history. Some of the major contributors to the journal included Thomas C. Jerdon and Walter Elliot. The library run by the society in a red sandstone building in the Department of Public Instruction complex in Nungambakkam is the oldest functional public library in the city and one of the oldest in India. The Government Museum, Chennai started as an extension of the Madras Literary Society library in Nungambakkam before moving to the present premises in Pantheon Road, Egmore. In 1890, a major part of the library's book collection was moved to a new building in the same premises as the museum to form the Connemara Public Library. The main library continues to exist in the premises of the DPI, taken care of by dedicated committee members and patrons.

== List of Members and Patrons ==
The Madras Literary society, has had a history of being a very prestigious organistion during the Raj era, attracting the intellectuals, aristocrats and high-ranking officers of the British Raj, among them the most notable of its historic Members include:

=== 19th Century ===
- Francis whyte Ellis (one of the major founding fathers of the society in Fort St.George, c. 1812))
- Benjamin Guy Babington (joined c. 1812)
- Kavali Lakshmayya (joined c.1830)
- Ram Raz (joined c.1830)
- George Norton ( joined c.1830)
- Thomas C. Jerdon (joined c.1840)
- Sir Walter Elliot (joined c. 1850)
- Captin Linnaeus Tripe (joined c. 1857)

=== 20th Century ===
- Annie Besant (joined c.1910)
- Subhas Chandra bhose (joined c.1920)
- Sir Alladi Krishnaswamy Iyer (joined c.1930)
- Dr.S Radhakrishnan (joined c. 1930)
- Sir A. Lakshmanaswami Mudaliar (joined c.1940)
- T.T Krishnamachari (joined c. 1940)
- KA Nilakanta Sastri (joined c. 1940)

== See also ==
- Asiatic Society
- Delhi Archaeological Society
