= N. P. Chakravarti =

Indian archaeologist (1893–1956)

Niranjan Prasad Chakravarti OBE
- Born: 1 July 1893; Krishnanagar, Bengal Presidency, British India
- Died: 19 October 1956 (aged 63); New Delhi, India
- Occupations: epigraphist, archaeologist

Niranjan Prasad Chakravarti (IAST: Nirañjana Prasāda Cakravarti) OBE (1 July 1893 – 19 October 1956) was an Indian archaeologist who served as the Chief epigraphist to the Government of India in 1934 to 1940 and as Director-general of the Archaeological Survey of India from 1948 to 1950.

== Early life and education ==
Chakravarti was born on 1 July 1893 in Krishnanagar in the Nadia district of Bengal Presidency, India. His parents were Hariprasad Chakravarti and Shahimukhi Devi. After graduation, he served as a lecturer of Sanskrit and Pali at the University of Calcutta. After working at the Sorbonne in Paris and the Berlin University on a scholarship in 1921, Chakravarti went to the United Kingdom and obtained a doctorate from the University of Cambridge in 1926. After obtaining his PhD from Cambridge, he was tasked by Paul Pelliot with editing and annotating the oldest Brahmi inscriptions found in Central Asia.

== Career ==
Chakravarti returned to India in 1929 and joined as the Assistant Superintendent for Epigraphy at Ootacamund. In 1934, he was promoted to the post of Chief Epigraphist for the Government of India. In 1938, he excavated some (exact number unknown) of the 100 Chaitya caves in Bandhavgarh National Park.

In 1940, he was promoted to the rank of the Deputy Director-General of the Archaeological Survey of India and then the rank of the Joint Director-General in 1945. In 1948, Chakravarti succeeded Mortimer Wheeler as the Director General of the ASI serving in this position till 1950. He was the first Indian to hold this rank in Independent India. He was also made a Fellow of the Royal Asiatic Society of Bengal.

== Later life ==
Following his retirement, Chakravarti was appointed as an advisor to the Department of Archaeology, Government of India and served till 1952. Chakravarti died on 19 October 1956 in New Delhi.

== Works ==
- L'UDĀNAVARGA SANSKRIT --- Texte sanskrit en transcription, avec traduction et annotations, suivi d'une étude critique et de planches, Tome I, Librairie Orientaliste Paul Geuthner, Paris, 1930, 272 pp.
- --- Tome II, 16 planches, 1931, environ 250 pp.
- India and Java. Volumes 1–2. With Bijan Raj Chatterjee. Calcutta: M.C. Das, Prabasi Press (1933).
- India and Central Asia. Calcutta: Avinash Chandra Sarkar (1927). Greater India Society Series, no. 4. OCLC 28408300.
- Presidential Address for the Indian History Congress, Seventeenth Session, Ahmedabad, 27 Dec. 1954. Published in 1955. OCLC 68776340.
- Minor Buddhist Texts Part 1. With Giuseppe Tucci. Rome: Ist. ital. per il Medio ed Estremo Oriente (1956). Serie Orientale Roma: 9(1). OCLC 245707156. Subtext:
  - Asaṅga's commentary on the Vajracchedikā edited and translated
  - Analysis of the commentary on it by Vasubandhu
  - Mahāyāna-viṃśikā of Nāgārjuna
  - Navaślokī of Kambalapāda
  - Catuḥstavasamāsārtha of Amṛtākara
  - Hetutattvopadeśa of Jitāri
  - Tarkasopāna by Vidyākaraśānti
  - With an appendix containing the Gilgit text of the Vajracchedikā
- Minor Buddhist texts Part 2. First Bhāvanākrama of Kamalaśīla: Sanskrit and Tibetan texts with introduction and English summary. With Giuseppe Tucci. Rome: Ist. ital. per il Medio ed Estremo Oriente (1958). Serie Orientale Roma: 9(2). OCLC 1073659504.
- Minor Buddhist texts Part 2. Third Bhāvanākrama of Kamalaśīla: With Giuseppe Tucci. Rome: Ist. ital. per il Medio ed Estremo Oriente (1971, posthumous). Serie Orientale Roma: 43(3). OCLC 1074913784.
- Ajanta: the colour and monochrome reproductions of the Ajanta frescoes based on photography. London: Oxford University Press (1933). With John Allan, Laurence Binyon, Ghulam Yazdani, Bahadur Chand Chhabra. Part 1: OCLC 247029928. Part 2: OCLC 247030184.

Edited:

- Epigraphia Indica
- Ancient India
- Archaeology in India (the ASI Annual review)
- Sutta Piṭaka

Preceded by Mortimer Wheeler	Director General of the Archaeological Survey of India; 1948 - 1950	Succeeded by Madho Sarup Vats
