= Asim Ghosh =

Indian businessman

Asim Ghosh (Hindi: असीम घोष; born December 7, 1947) is the former president and CEO of Husky Energy, one of Canada's largest integrated energy companies. He retired in December 2016 and sat on Husky's board of directors until December 2020 when it merged with Cenovus Energy Inc.

Ghosh has held senior leadership roles in Canada, India and Hong Kong at a number of multinational corporations, including Carling O'Keefe (now part of Molson Coors), Pepsi Foods, and Hutchison Whampoa.

== Education ==
Ghosh did his schooling at St. Columba's School, Delhi and graduated from the Indian Institute of Technology in Delhi in 1969 with a bachelor's degree in Electrical Engineering. Ghosh received his MBA from the Wharton School at the University of Pennsylvania in 1970.

== Career ==
Ghosh began his career with Procter & Gamble (Canada) in 1971. He joined Rothmans International in 1980, eventually becoming Senior Vice President with the subsidiary Carling O'Keefe, which was one of Canada's largest breweries. In 1989, Ghosh became founding co-CEO of Pepsi Foods (India) and was tasked with setting up food operations in the country. He moved to Hong Kong in 1991 in order to set up a consumer goods joint venture between Pepsi and Hutchison Whampoa. Shortly thereafter, he became the CEO of AS Watson Industries, a subsidiary of Hutchison Whampoa (1991–1998).

In 1998, Ghosh took the role of leading Hutchison Whampoa's telecommunications joint venture in India, where he served as the Managing Director and CEO of Hutchison Essar Ltd. Ghosh served in the role until announcing his retirement in March 2009. During his tenure, the company grew from a one-city operation to become the country's second-largest mobile phone provider, with more than 63 million subscribers. In 2007, he presided over the sale of Hutchison Whampoa's stake in the company to Vodafone in a deal that valued the business at approximately $19 billion. At the time, the sale was the biggest corporate takeover in India's history and, according to a Thomson Reuters analysis, the largest all-cash transaction in Asia up to 2007, with Vodafone agreeing to pay $11.1 billion in cash for Hutchison Whampoa's stake.

In June 2010, Ghosh became President and CEO of Husky Energy. He retired in December 2016 and served on Husky's Board of Directors until December 2020 when Husky merged with Cenovus. In April 2019, he joined the board of Hutchison Drei Austria, a telecommunications company and in addition, serves on the boards of several UK-based companies.

Under his tenure at Husky, the Company successfully completed two of the largest projects in its history – the Liwan Gas Project offshore China and the Sunrise Energy Project in the Fort McMurray oil sands of Alberta, Canada. Ghosh also oversaw the transformation of the Company's heavy oil business through the deployment of thermal technology. Thermal heavy oil production grew from approximately 18,000 barrels per day (bbls/day) in 2010 to about 80,000 bbls/day at the end of 2016.

== Affiliations ==
Ghosh is a former member of the board of the Business Council of Canada, a former chairman of the National Telecom Committee of the Confederation of Indian Industry, a former chairman of the Cellular Operators Association of India and is a distinguished alumnus of the Indian Institute of Technology Delhi. He is also a former member of the board of governors of the Banff Centre and a former director of the Li Ka Shing (Canada) Foundation.

Coat of Arms
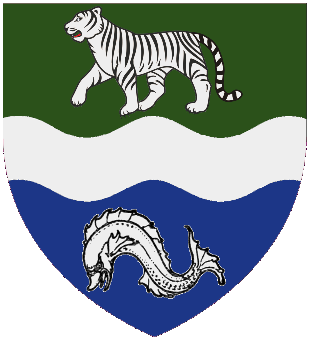
- Crest: An Asian elephant passant its trunk raised proper caparisoned Vert.
- Shield: Per fess Vert and Azure a fess wavy between in chief a Bengal tiger passant guardant Argent striped Sable and in base a dolphin naiant Argent.
- Motto: TOUT DÉPEND DE NOTRE PENSÉE (trans. "It All Depends On Our Thinking").
- Badge: On a pomme an Asian elephant’s head couped its trunk raised Argent.

== Personal life ==
Ghosh is married to Sanjukta Ghosh, who is the granddaughter of Rai Sahib Nagendra Kumar Bhattacharyya, a lawyer and member of the West Bengal Legislative Council, and great-granddaughter of Rai Bahadur Kedar Nath Chowdhury. Asim and Sanjukta Ghosh have two sons. Asim Ghosh is the son of Padma Shri Amalananda Ghosh, an Indian archaeologist who served as Director General of the Archaeological Survey of India from 1953 to 1968, and Sudha Ghosh.
