= Hazrat Pir Mohammad Shah Library =

Library in Ahmedabad, India

Coordinates: 23.026275°N 72.586514°E

The Hazrat Pir Muhammad Shah Library is a library on Pir Muhammad Shah Road, Pankore Naka, Ahmedabad, in the state of Gujarat, India. One of the oldest libraries in India, it has a collection of rare original manuscripts in Arabic, Persian, Urdu, Sindhi and Turkish languages.

== History ==
The library is located within the precincts of the tomb-shrine complex of Pir Muhammad Shah, a Sufi who was born in Bijapur in 1688 and migrated to Ahmedabad in 1711, where he died in 1749. He belonged to the Qadiri Shattari Sufi order. The library started with book that Muhammad Shah himself had brought from Arabia, and then was expanded by his disciples with books that they had acquired locally and abroad.

Prominent writer and scholar Professor Mohyiuddin Bombaywala has held the post of director since last 30 years. Dr. Ziauddin A. Desai, the well-known numismatist and scholar, was associated with the Library and its governing trust until his death in 2002.

== Catalogues ==
Arabi, Farsi, Urdu makhtūtāt kī wadahatī fihrist, 10 vols., (Ahmedabad: Pir Muhammad Shah Dargah Sharif Trust) 1998. Shaykh Farid al-Din Burhanpuri, d. 1998, "Kutub khanah-yi Dargah Hazrat Pir Muhammad Shah," Nawa-i Adab (October 1955); Taher, Amin Ahmed Khan, and Muhammed Burhanuddin, "Dargah Libraries in India: A Comparative Study," International Library Journal 18 (1986): 337–345; Z. A. Desai, "Some Rare Seal-Bearing Persian Manuscripts in the Hazrat P. M. Dargah Library," Indo-Iranica 46, l-lv (1993): 52–73. Works on the history or individual manuscripts in the Library: published 6 journals. 12 catalogues.
