= Charles Aemilius Oldham =

Irish geologist

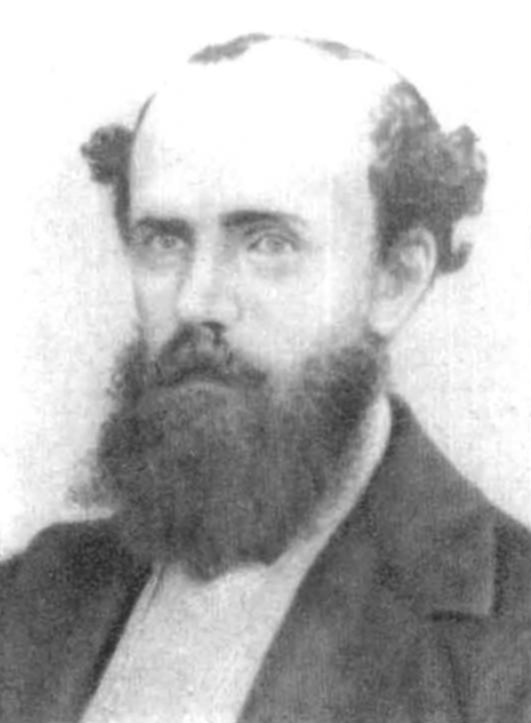

Charles Aemilius Oldham (or Charles Æmilius Oldham) (1831 – 30 March 1869) was an Irish geologist who worked in India. He was the brother of Thomas Oldham who also worked with the Geological Survey of India.

Oldham was the son of Thomas Oldham and Margaret Oldham (née Boyd) of Dublin. He studied at Dublin university from 1846 and obtained a B.A. in 1852. He then studied at the School of Mines in London and joined the Geological Survey of India in 1856, working as Deputy Superintendent in the Madras Presidency. He married Evelyn, daughter of Professor William King (King's son, also William King worked in the Geological Survey of India) of Galway, in 1868 and went home in December apparently in good health but in two months he was hospitalized. A guinea worm infestation had led to infection of his legs and he died of lung congestion on 30 March 1869 while just 38 years old. He was survived by his widow and son C. E. A. W. Oldham.

His work in India included the discovery of quartzite stone implements in Rayachoti, then in the Madras Presidency.
