= C. E. A. W. Oldham =

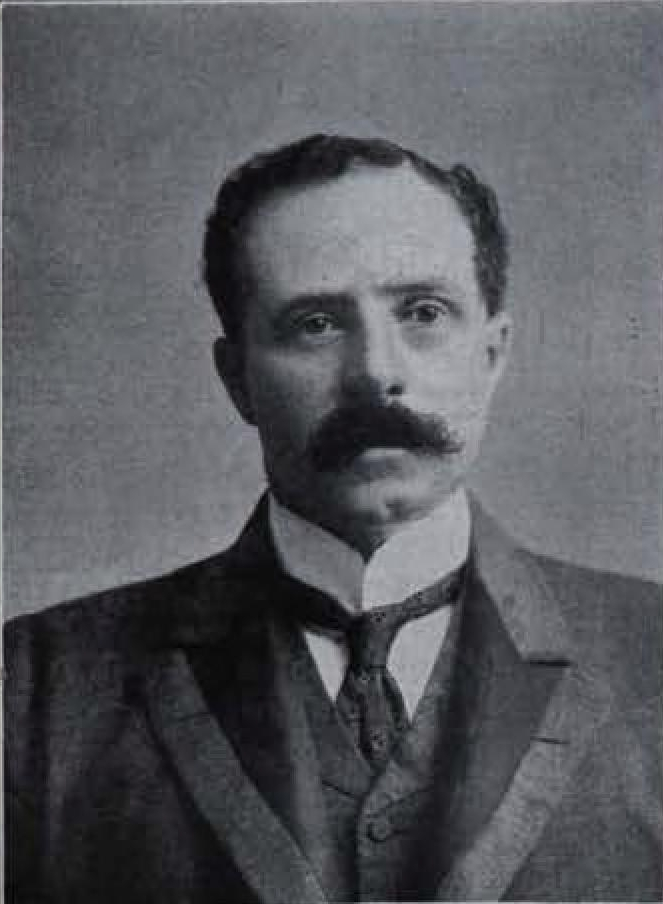
c. 1907

Charles Evelyn Arbuthnot William Oldham, CSI, FRGS or C. E. A. W. Oldham (15 September 1869 — 18 November 1949) was a British Indian civil servant, historian and scholar.

Oldham was born in Galway, son of geologist Charles Aemilius Oldham and was educated at Galway Grammar School and Balliol College, Oxford. He joined the Indian Civil Service in 1885 and went to work in Bengal. He initially worked as an assistant magistrate and collector. In 1895 he became under secretary to government. He served as district officer of Gaya for five years and Munger for two years worked in the agricultural department from 1905. He was awarded the Kaisar-i-Hind medal, first class in 1902 for his services during the plague in Gaya. He was an expert on Magadhi, Maithili, and Bhojpuri and worked on local archaeology. After he retired in 1919 from service he served as an assistant editor for the Indian Antiquary and following the death of Sir Richard Temple in 1931, he took over as editor. He edited notes on the travels of Francis Buchanan in Bhagalpur and Shahabad.
