= K. N. Srivastava =

Indian Administrative Service.Officer

Kailash Nath Shrivastava

Director, India International Centre
- Incumbent
- Assumed office 1 January 2019

Secretary, Ministry of Civil Aviation
- In office 1 August 2012 – 31 December 2013
- Preceded by: Syed Nasim Ahmad Zaidi

Personal details
- Born: 1 January 1954 (age 72) Karahiya, Ghazipur, Uttar Pradesh
- Occupation: civil servant

K. N. Shrivastava (born 1 January 1954) is an official of the Indian Administrative Service. He served as the Director General of the Archaeological Survey of India from January 2009 to January 2010. Prior to that, he was the Joint Secretary in the Ministry of Civil Aviation.

Preceded by C. Babu Rajeev	Director General of the Archaeological Survey of India; 2009-2010	Succeeded by Gautam Sengupta
