= Amalananda Ghosh =

Indian archaeologist (1910–1981)

- Born: 3 March 1910; Varanasi, British India
- Died: 1981 (aged 70–71)
- Known for: Respected Indian archaeologist, former Director General of the Archaeological Survey of India

Amalananda Ghosh (3 March 1910 – 1981) was an Indian archaeologist, author and editor of numerous works on India's ancient civilizations, and the organizer and director of archaeological expeditions during the mid-1900s.

== Education ==
Ghosh was born on 3 March 1910 in Varanasi, India. He was educated in Varanasi and Allahabad and later received advanced training at the Institute of Archaeology at the University of London.

== Career ==
Ghosh joined the Archaeological Survey of India in 1937 and eventually rose to become its Director-General. He served in that position from 1953 to 1968.

During his period with the Survey, Ghosh led or participated in a number of excavations, including investigations at Pachmarhi, Bikaner, Brahmagiri, Maski, Taxila, Arikamedu, and Harappa. In 1950, Ghosh organized and began a systematic exploration of the Bikaner site, along the dried-up bed of the ancient Saraswati River. Within a few months, his work uncovered more than 100 sites, 25 of which yielded similar antiquities to those found at Harappa and Mohenjodaro.

During his tenure as Director General, the landmark Centenary of the Archaeological Survey of India was held in 1961.

Following his term with the Survey, Ghosh acted as a UNESCO consultant on archaeology to the Governments of Qatar (1968), Bahrain (1968), Saudi Arabia (1968–69) and Yemen (1970). He was a Fellow of the Indian Institute of Advanced Study from 1968 to 1971.

Ghosh authored and edited a number of books and publications over the span of his career, including The Encyclopedia of Indian Archaeology, a comprehensive reference book on archaeological work conducted over the years in India. Other works include A Survey of the Recent Progress in Early Indian Archaeology, The City in Early Historical India, (13) and A Guide to Nālandā.

== Personal ==
With his wife Sudha Ghosh, Amalananda had two children, Suparna Ghosh and Asim Ghosh. His affiliations included serving as vice-president of the Royal India, Pakistan and Ceylon Society, London; Honorary Fellow of the Society of Antiquaries, London, and Honorary Fellow of the Deutsches Archaeologisches Institut, Berlin. He received the Padma Shri honor in 1962.

Preceded by Madho Sarup Vats	Director General of the Archaeological Survey of India; 1953 - 1969	Succeeded by B. B. Lal
