= Zubaida Yazdani =

Indian historian

- زبیدھ یسدانی
- Born: 27 April 1916; Hyderabad, India
- Died: 11 June 1996 (aged 80); London, England
- Education: Oxford University; School of Oriental and African Studies
- Occupations: Historian, writer
- Spouse: Mir Yaseen Ali Khan
- Family: Ghulam Yazdani (father)

Zubaida Yazdani (27 April 1916 – 11 June 1996) was an Indian historian specialising in the history of the Deccan Plateau and the Nizam State of Hyderabad, in India.

== Biography ==
Yazdani was born in Hyderabad, India on 27 April 1916. Yazdani was one of the first Asian women to enter Oxford University. She authored two books and numerous scholarly articles about the history of India. Her book Hyderabad During the Residency of Henry Russell, 1811–1820 was a scholarly exposition of the Indian Subsidiary Alliance system. A second book, The Seventh Nizam: The Fallen Empire, was a memoir of the last Nizam of Hyderabad and also a study of the constitutional and political complexities which surrounded the relations of the Indian states with the British Raj. Her scholarship explores the topics based on the painstaking use of original records, documents that had been overlooked by previous investigators. Deeply archival, Yazdani's scholarship challenged of conventional histories.

Yazdani also supervised the translation of Nazir Ahmad Dehlvi's novel Taubat-Al-Nusuh (English: Repentance Of Nussooh: The Tale Of A Muslim Family A Hundred Years Ago) from Urdu into English: A literary work of the late 19th century on the life of Muslims in India.

Yazdani taught for more than three decades in college in Hyderabad, India, where she was one of the main founders of a college for women. She also started the Hyderabad School for Languages and Science in London, teaching primary, junior and secondary pupils in Urdu as well as the curriculum subjects of English, mathematics, computer studies, French, and Arabic to students from primary to O and A Levels.

== Personal life ==
Yazdani was the oldest daughter of historian and archaeologist Ghulam Yazdani. Yazdani was married to Mir Yaseen Ali Khan, who was an Urdu poet. Yazdani was one of the first Asian women to enter Oxford University. Yazdani graduated in 1940. After the outbreak of World War II, she was determined to stay on and do postgraduate studies at Oxford.

On return to Hyderabad she was appointed lecturer (1942) and then reader (1947) in history at the Women's College, Osmania University. She taught for many years while also conducting and publishing research.

She returned to Britain in 1963 and attended postgraduate classes at London University School of Oriental and African Studies. She later transferred to Oxford University, where she completed her postgraduate studies at St. Hilda's College.

From 1967 to 1969 she was senior reader at the women's college, Osmania University, and was also its acting principal. Then she became reader in history at the Arts college, Osmania University, and finally head of its history department.

With Mary Crystal she wrote her second book, The seventh Nizam: The fallen empire.

Yazdani died in London on 11 June 1996.

== Scholarly and literary work ==
Yazdani published her first book "Hyderabad during the residency of Henry Russell 1811 – 1820". The book was based on her B.Litt. thesis based on original sources which were available at the Bodleian Library which housed the Russell and Palmer papers. She was the first to make a detailed study of these papers.

Yazdani published her second book "The seventh Nizam: The fallen empire" in 1985. The book is a study of Hyderabad under the seventh Nizam and the British government's policies towards the Indian states. The book was based on original papers obtained from the India office library in London as well as original papers of the Nizam that were made available to her by the Nizam's family. Many of these papers have never been studied before this book was published.

Yazdani supervised the translation from Urdu into English of a novel Taubat al Nusuh, considered by many to be the first novel written in Urdu, by Nazir Ahmad Dehlvi, the first Urdu novelist.

She wrote numerous papers and articles presented at scholarly conferences.

== Social and educational work ==
Yazdani was involved in social and educational work including the establishment of a women's college.

A branch of the Federation of University Women was established at Hyderabad, under the name of the University Women's Cultural Association, where she was appointed its secretary. Zubaida Yazdani presented her proposal for the establishment of a new women's college to the association and the proposal was accepted by Sri Devi, the principal of the Women's College.

There was also no building for the proposed college. She approached Sultan Bazar Library because their buildings were empty all day and the administration of the library agreed to let the college use their buildings temporarily. Then the college was started with an initial enrolment of about 35 students. An incident that occurred during this time speaks to the unshakable determination and dedication of Zubaida Yazdani. The Sultan Bazaar library eventually wanted their rooms back and decided to make the college leave by locking the doors to the building. They would not listen to any requests from the college. Zubaida Yazdani faced this crisis in her usual determined way. She told the students to go home and that it was a college holiday for them and to come back to the same place the next day and they would be informed of the college's new location. She also told the teachers to come back the next day at their usual time and they would then go to the new premises. The teachers were astonished because there weren't any new buildings to move to. She then went home and took her teenaged son with her and took him with her and went to meet the President and Secretary of the Sir Nizamat Jung Trust library. She requested that the halls and rooms of the library be rented out to the college. The President and Secretary of the library announced the forming of a committee and then we will let you know their decision. Yazdani told them that by the time the committee is formed the college will be finished. The President and Secretary then asked her more questions about the college. They were so impressed by her determination and dedication and also that she was not about to take no for an answer that they gave her the keys to the halls and rooms the same day. The next day when the students and teachers came back to the college, they were met by a smiling Zubaida Yazdani who gave them directions to the new college building. Eventually the college moved to a more permanent location. Under her leadership the college started arts classes in history, economics and sociology for underprivileged girls. Then science classes were started and a library and laboratory were set up, with very satisfactory results. Zubaida Yazdani wanted that the college should be affiliated with Osmania university. One lakh rupees (Rs. 100,000) were needed for the proposal. The Osmania university graduates association office bearer Rai Shankar Ji took the fully functional college under the sponsorship of the Association. And in 1961, despite opposition, the U.W.C.A. college was affiliated to Osmania University. It is now, under its Hindi name, Sarojini Naidu Vanitha Maha Vidyalaya, one of the largest women's colleges in Telangana state. It is located in the Nampally area of Hyderabad.

Yazdani's son Hussain Ali Khan, who as a child was often her companion on fund raising trips wrote the following about her, "About the founding of the college for women; she felt the need for such an Institution as there were not adequate places and opportunities for women whom she believed strongly in. When she made up her mind about something she felt strongly about, there was no stopping her and there was no word like NO in her dictionary of life. In the days of old it was not the IN thing for women to go to rich or powerful men's houses or see them personally on their own so I, being a very young teenage son used to accompany her on these missions of gathering funds for the cause from powerful bankers, heads of companies, directors, etc. As the occasion demanded her charisma and powers of persuasion at convincing the great and the good were like magic, and they were like putty in her hands and it was extraordinary to watch".

Yazdani also established the Hyderabad School for Languages and Sciences in Hackney in London. The school was started in February 1981 because she had been approached by parents of children from Hyderabad and Pakistan to teach Urdu. She and her husband, Mir Yaseen Ali Khan, initially taught the classes, but after a few months the Inner London Education Authority visited the school and awarded a grant. After that, the school was able to employ more teachers. The school taught primary, junior and secondary pupils in Urdu up the O and A level. The school also taught English, Arabic, and Science subjects. The school closed some years after Zubaida Yazdani's death.

Yazdani was also an office bearer in various Urdu and history associations and published research in academic journals

== Books ==
- Hyderabad during the Residency of Henry Russell 1811 – 1820
- Seventh Nizam, The Fallen Empire
