= James Burgess (archaeologist) =

British archaeologist (1832–1916)

James Burgess CIE, FRSE, FRGS, MRAS
- Born: 14 August 1832; Kirkmahoe, Dumfriesshire, Scotland, UK
- Died: 3 October 1916 (aged 84); Edinburgh, Scotland
- Education: University of Glasgow; University of Edinburgh
- Occupation: Archaeologist
- Known for: 19th-century Indian archaeology
- Title: Director General of the Archaeological Survey of India

James Burgess (14 August 1832 – 3 October 1916), was the founder of The Indian Antiquary in 1872 and an important archaeologist of India in the 19th century.

== Life ==
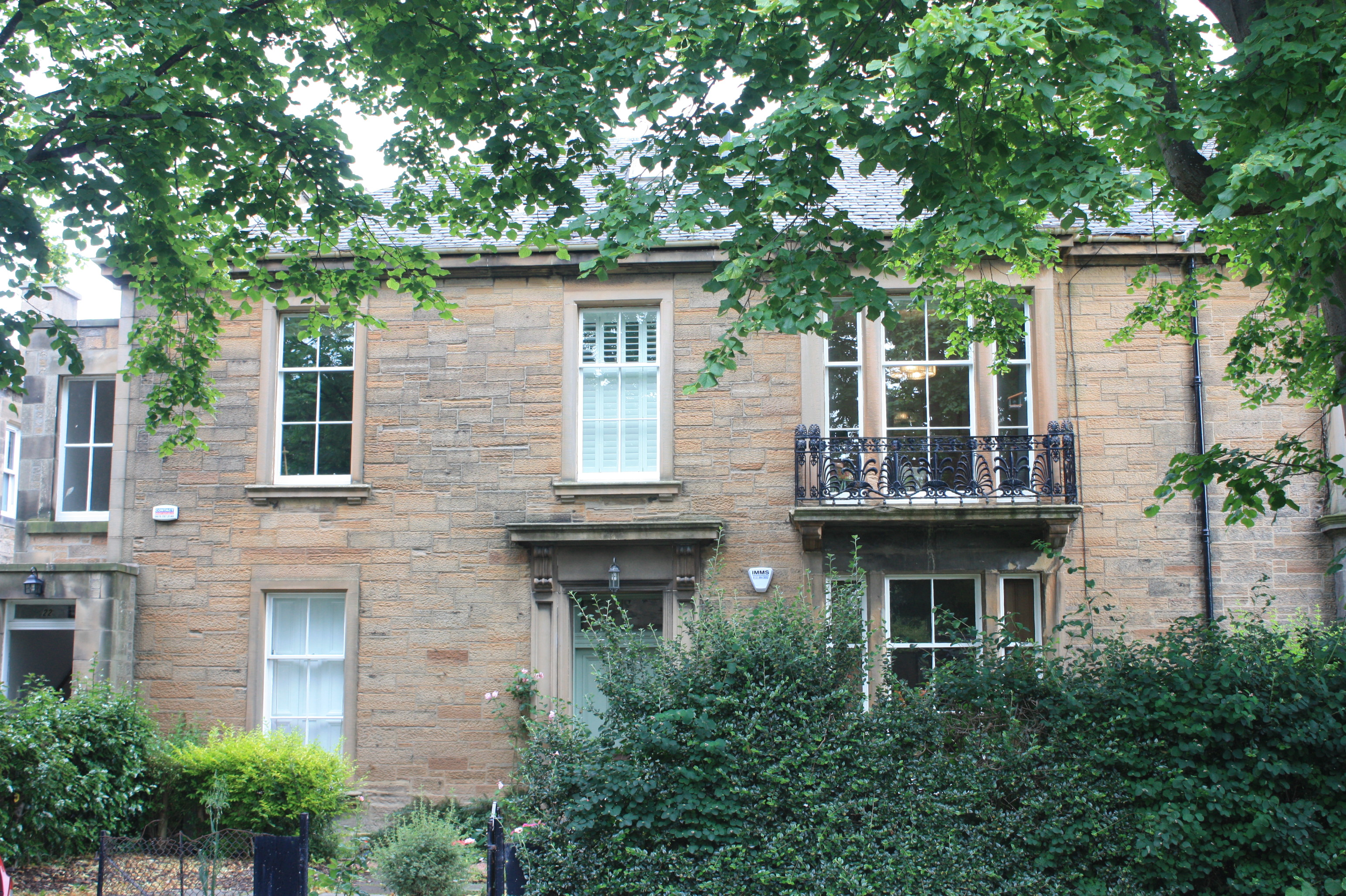
22 Seton Place, Edinburgh

Burgess was born on 14 August 1832 in Kirkmahoe, Dumfriesshire. He was educated at Dumfries and then the University of Glasgow and the University of Edinburgh.

He did educational work in Calcutta, 1856 and Bombay, 1861, and was Secretary of the Bombay Geographical Society 1868–73. He was Head of the Archaeological Survey, Western India, 1873, and of South India, 1881. From 1886 to 1889 he was Director General, Archaeological Survey of India.

In 1881 the University of Edinburgh awarded him an honorary Doctor of Letters (LLD).

He retired to Edinburgh around 1892.

He was elected a Fellow of the Royal Society of Edinburgh in 1894. He won its Keith Medal for 1897–99, and served as their Vice President 1908 to 1914.

He died on 3 October 1916, at 22 Seton Place in Edinburgh.

== Selected publications ==
- The Temples of Shatrunjaya. 1869.
- The Rock Temples of Elephanta. 1871.
- Temples of Somanath, Gunagadh and Girnar. 1870.
- Scenery and Architecture in Guzarat and Rajputana. 1873.
- Notes on Ajanta paintings. 1879.
- The Cave Temples of India. 1880. (With James Fergusson)
- Archaeological Survey of Western India. 9 vols., 1874 - 1905.
- Buddhist Stupas of Amaravati, etc. 1887.
- Antiquities of Dabhoi. 1888.
- The Sharqi Architecture of Jaiinpur. 1889. (Editor)
- Archaeological Research in India. 1890.
- Epigraphia Indica. 1889–94. (2 vols.)
- On Hindu Astronomy. 1893.
- Constable's Hand-Gazetteer of India. 1898.
- Hypsometry by Boiling-point. 1858 and 1863.
- Transliteration of Indian Place-names. 1868, 1894–95.
- On the Error-function Definite Integral. 1898. (awarded the Keith medal, R.S.E.)
- The Gandhara Sculptures. 1899 and 1900.
- Buddhist Art in India. 1901. (enlarged translation)
- The Indian Sect of the Jainas. 1903. (translated and edited)
- Fergusson's Indian and Eastern Architecture. 1919. (enlarged edition)

Preceded by Alexander Cunningham	Director General of the Archaeological Survey of India ??–1902	Succeeded by John Marshall
