= The Indian Antiquary =

Academic journal from India

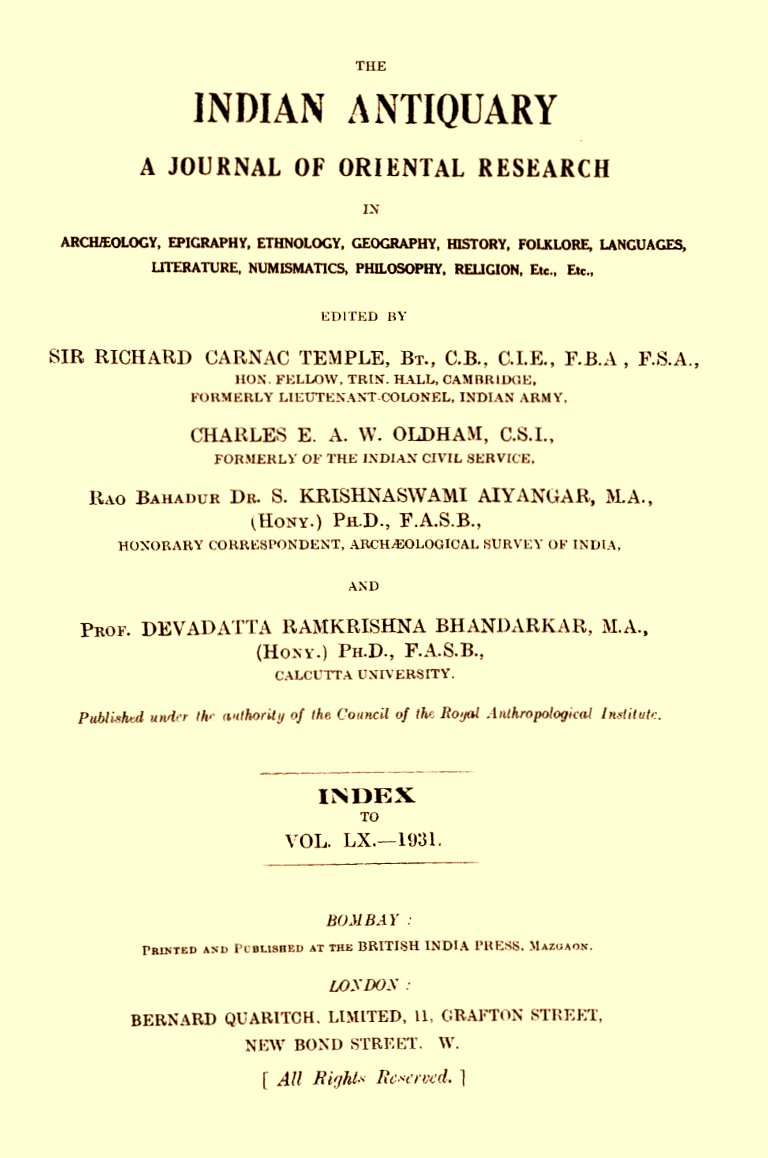
- Cover page of a 1931 edition of The Indian Antiquary
- Discipline: Numismatics, Archaeology, Asian history, Folklore, Philology, Anthropology, Indology
- Language: English

Publication details
- History: 1872–1971
- Publisher: Bombay Education Society, British India Press (India)

Standard abbreviations
- ISO 4: Indian Antiqu.

Indexing
- ISSN: 0019-4395
- OCLC no.: 891010482

The Indian Antiquary: A journal of oriental research in archaeology, history, literature, language, philosophy, religion, folklore, &c, &c (subtitle varies) was a journal of original research relating to India, published between 1872 and 1933. It was founded by the archaeologist James Burgess to enable the sharing of knowledge between scholars based in Europe and in India and was notable for the high quality of its epigraphic illustrations which enabled scholars to make accurate translations of texts that in many cases remain the definitive versions to this day. It was also pioneering in its recording of Indian folklore. It was succeeded by The New Indian Antiquary (1938–47) and the Indian Antiquary (1964–71).

== History ==
The Indian Antiquary was founded in 1872 by the archaeologist James Burgess CIE as a journal of original research relating to India. It was designed to enable the sharing of knowledge between scholars based in Europe and in India.

The journal was a private venture, although no contributor or editor was ever paid for their work and the editors often had to support the publication out of their own pockets. Burgess was the first editor and he continued in that role until the end of 1884 when failing eyesight forced him to hand over to John Faithfull Fleet and Richard Carnac Temple.

The late nineteenth century was marked by a great increase in the number of local historical societies in India and a similar increase in the number of Indians who could speak and write English, to the extent that by the 1920s the entire journal could have been filled with work by Indian contributors. Volumes for 1925 to 1932 were published under the authority of the Council of the Royal Anthropological Institute (1933, not). The first incarnation of the Antiquary ceased publication in 1933 with volume 62, number 783 (Dec. 1933), two years after Richard Temple's death in 1931 when it was edited by C. E. A. W. Oldham. Several early volumes of the journal were reprinted by Swati Publications in Delhi, 1984.

The New Indian Antiquary was published between 1938 and 1947, and the Indian Antiquary (described as the "third series") between 1964 and 1971. (Volumes 14 to 62 of the original Antiquary were described as the "second series".)

== Content ==
The journal had an archaeological and historical focus, and in the late nineteenth century that naturally meant that epigraphy (the study of inscriptions as writing rather than as literature) would be one of the principal subjects covered in its pages. Indeed, the Antiquary was the premier source of European scholarship on Indian epigraphy until the twentieth century and the official Indian government journal of epigraphy, the Epigraphia Indica, was published as a quarterly supplement to the Antiquary between 1892 and 1920.

The Antiquary was printed at Mazgaon, Bombay, by the Bombay Education Society and later the British India Press, but illustrations were produced in London by the firm of Griggs who were known for the accuracy of their work. A high standard of reproduction was essential so that scholars could work on the epigraphic material without needing to see the originals. Illustrations in the Antiquary were used by scholars such as Bhandarkar, Bhagvanlal Indraji, Georg Bühler, John Faithfull Fleet, Eggeling and B. Lewis Rice to decipher important inscriptions, and in many cases their translations remain the definitive versions to this day.

Over one thousand plates were included in The Indian Antiquary and the Epigraphia Indica over the first fifty years of publication, but having the illustrations produced abroad was not without its disadvantages. On one occasion during World War I, enemy action meant that expensive plates had to be sent from London three times before they reached Bombay safely.

Another area where the Antiquary led was in recording folklore and folktales. Its publication of Punjab folktales was the first attempt to classify the events on which folk tales were based and the pioneering work on north Indian folklore of William Crooke and Pandit Ram Gharib Chaube was printed in its pages.
