= Archaeological Museum, Amaravati =

Archaeological museum in Andhra Pradesh, India

Amaravati Archaeological Museum
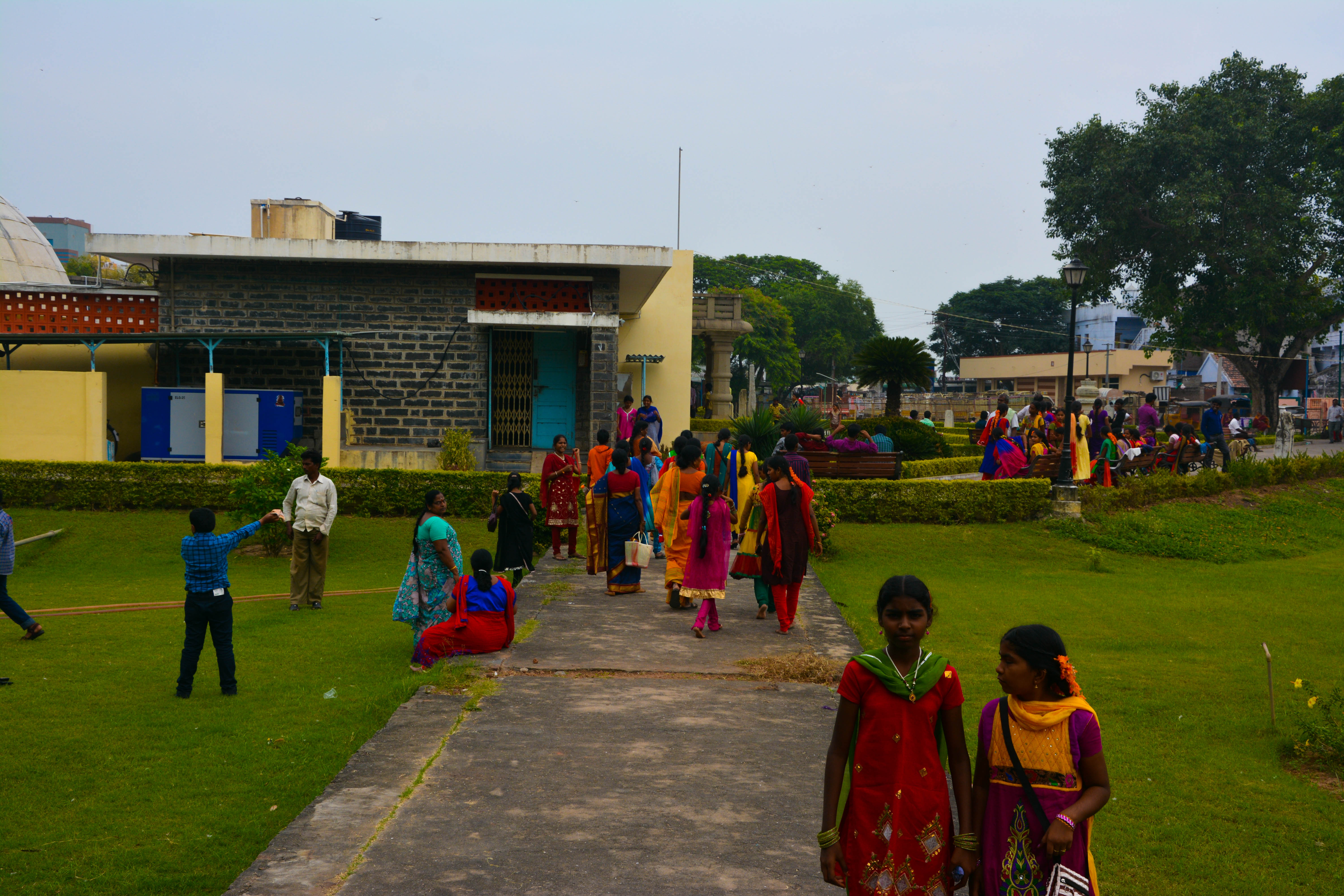
- Amaravathi Archeology Museum
- Location: Amaravati, Andhra Pradesh, India
- Coordinates: 16°34′28″N 80°21′29″E
- Type: Archaeological Museum

The Amaravati Archaeological Museum is a museum located in Amaravati, a village in Guntur district of the Indian state of Andhra Pradesh. The museum opens at 10:00 in the morning and closes at 5:00 pm, and is also closed for Friday holiday.

== Gallery ==
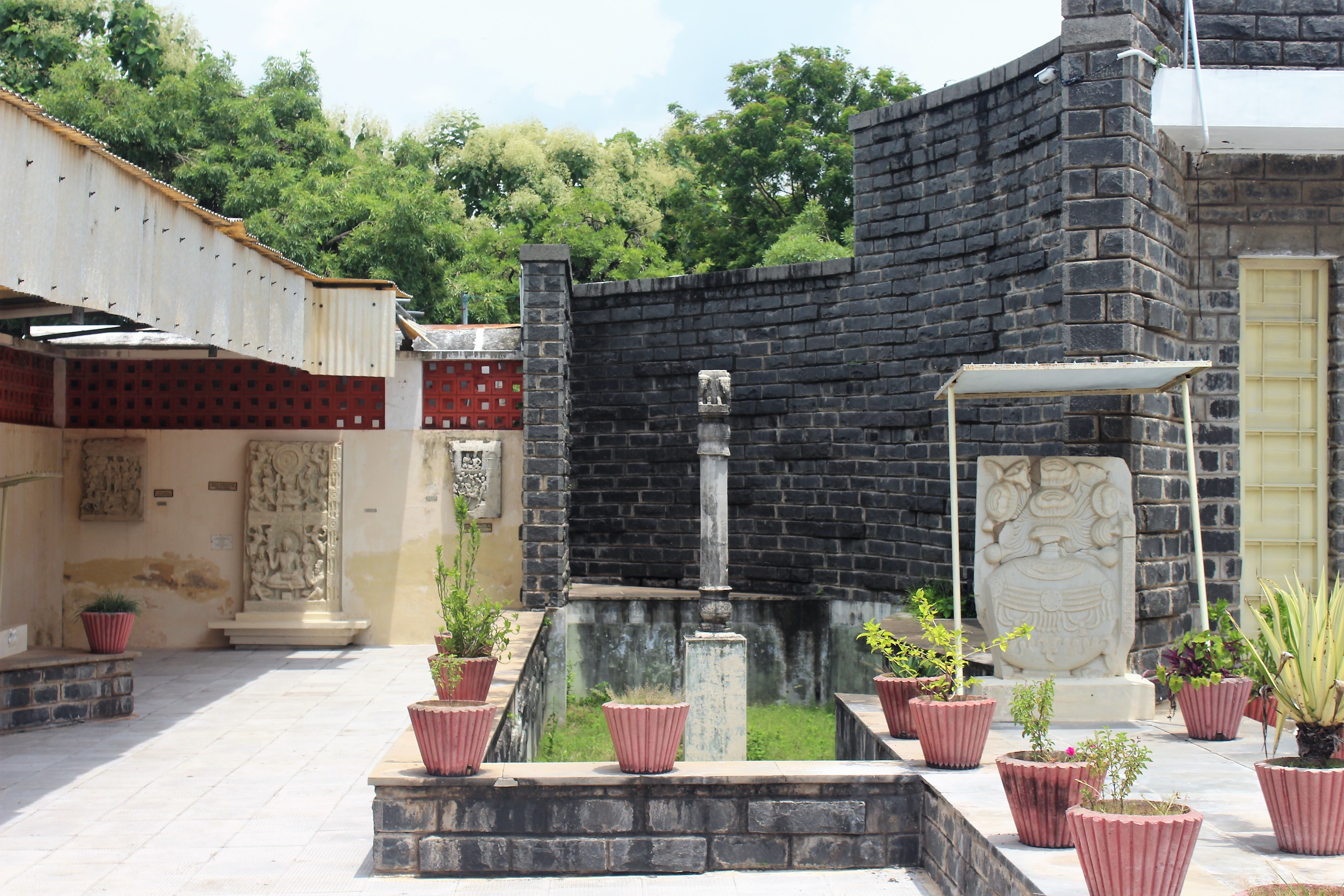
Stupas Hall

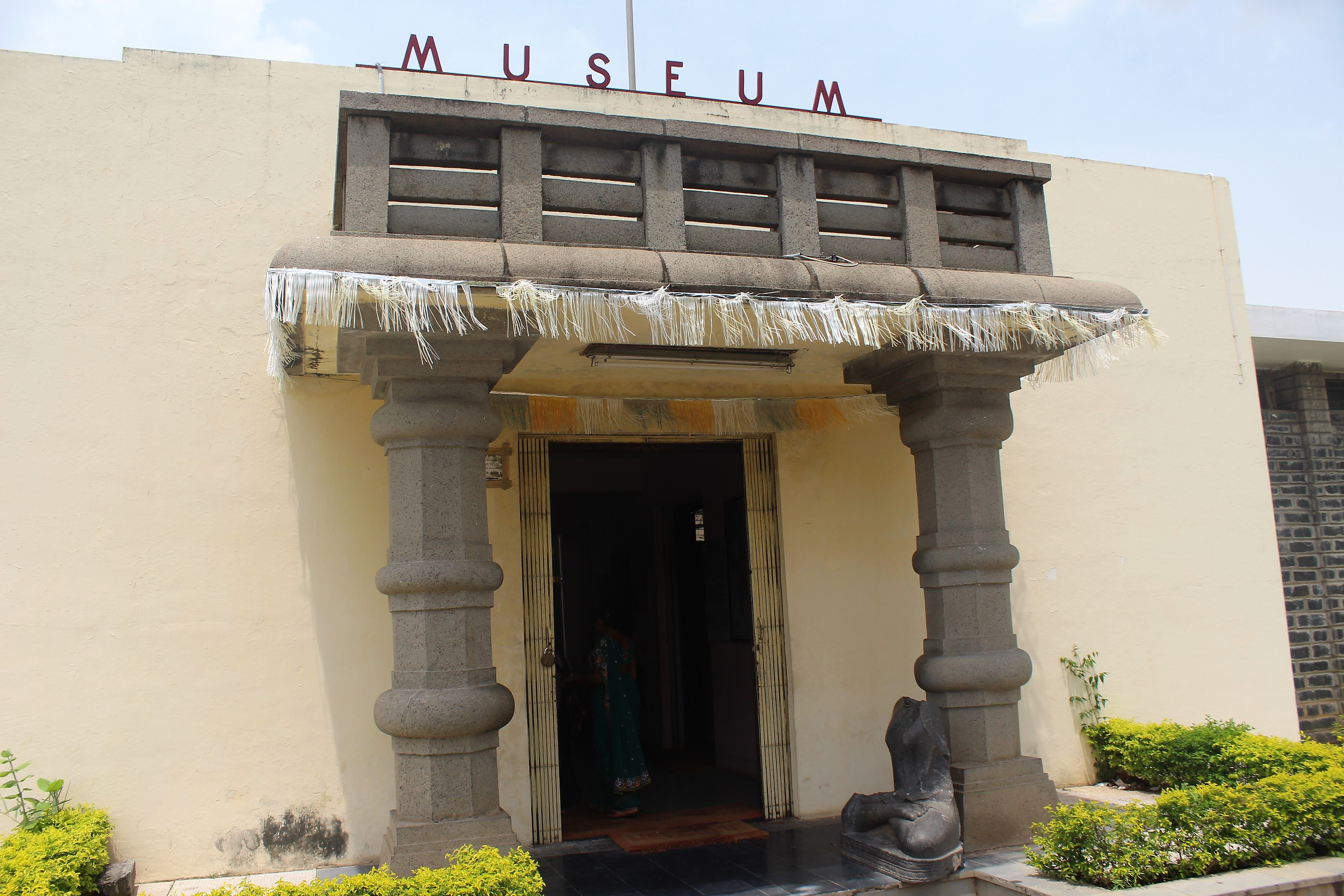
Entrance of Museum

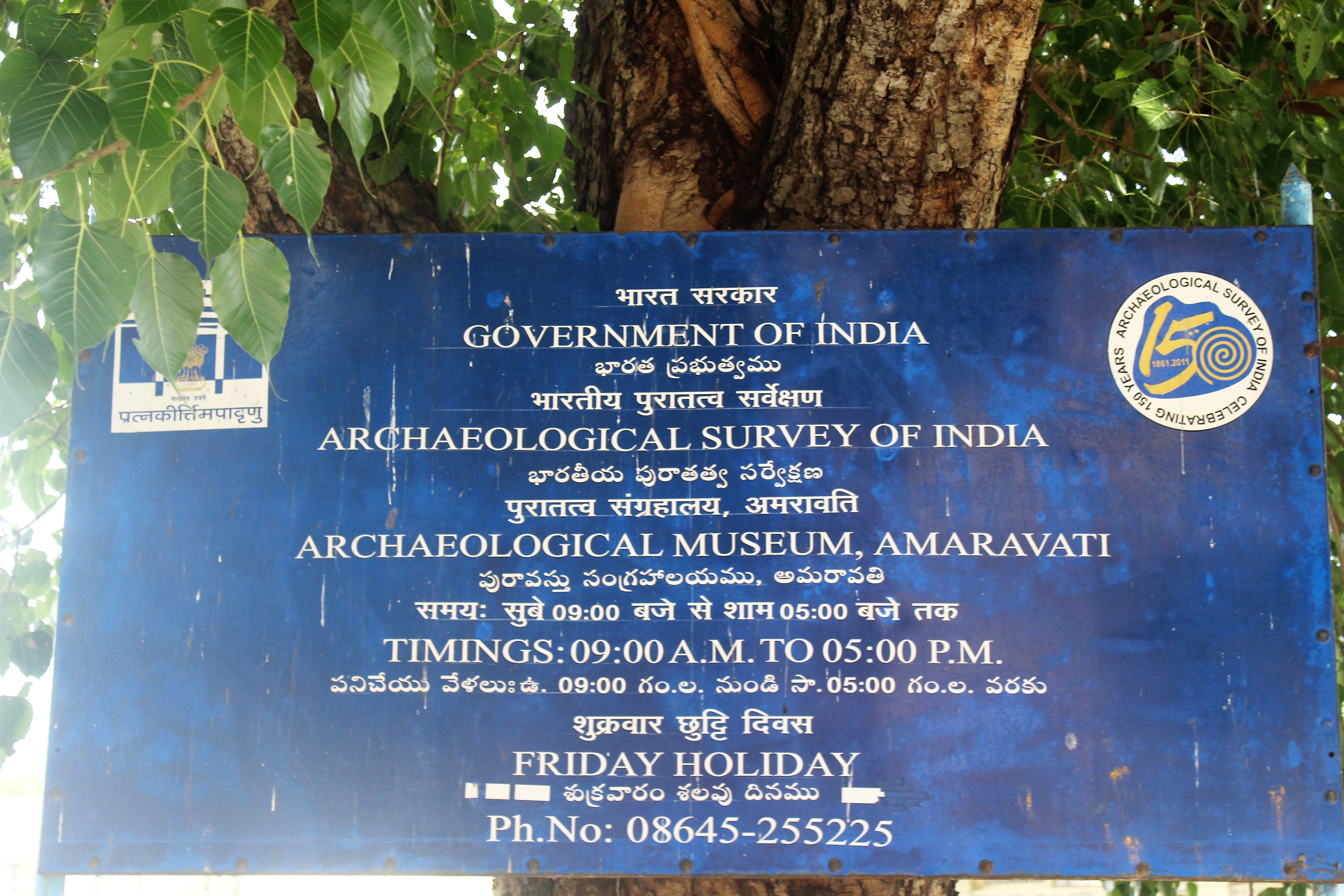
Hoarding

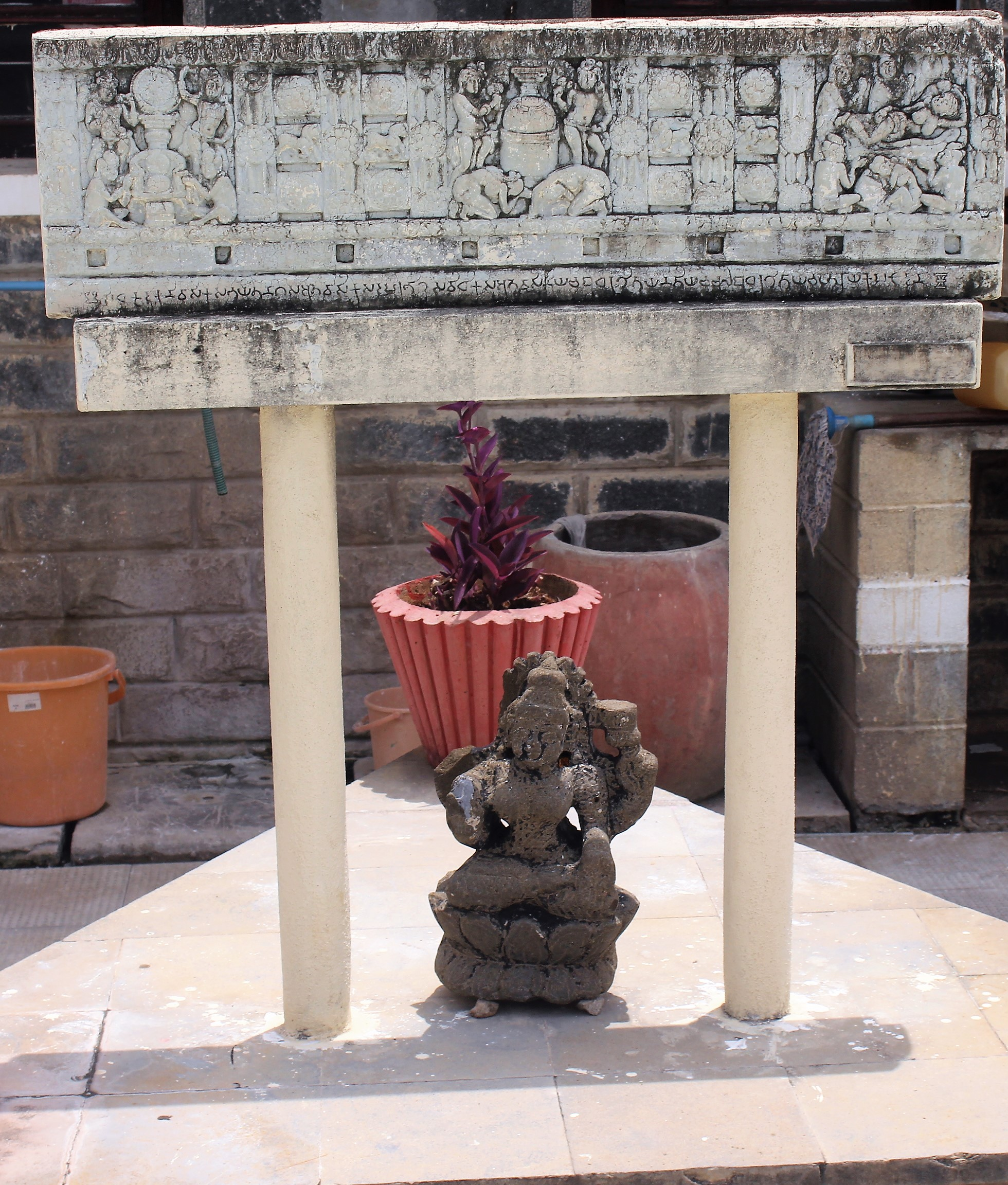
Hindu deity statue

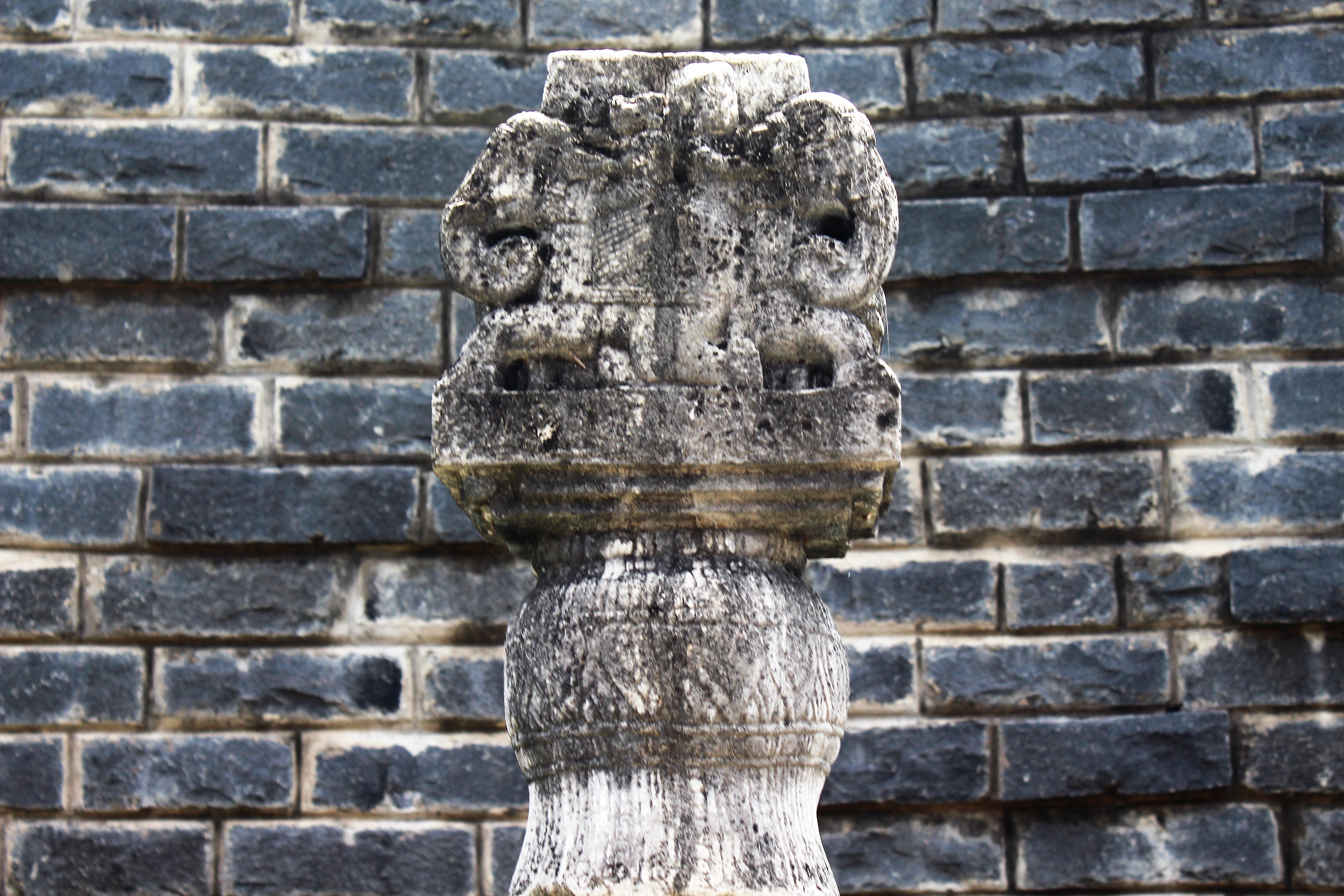
Historical pillar

== See also ==
- List of museums in India
