= Ancient India (journal) =

Academic journal

Ancient India was a bi-annual and later, annual bulletin published by the Archaeological Survey of India (ASI) from 1946 to 1966. It replaced the Annual Report that had previously been published by the Survey.

Established in January 1946 by Sir Mortimer Wheeler during his tenure as Director-General of the ASI, Ancient India was published with an aim to "interest the educated Indian public in current work relating to the exploration and conservation of their great heritage of material culture" as well as to "provide technical matter primarily of interest to the archaeologist". The journal quickly gained a reputation for its heavily illustrated and detailed excavation reports.

Some of the important archaeological discoveries reported in Ancient India include Wheeler's excavations at Indus Valley Civilisation sites and Arikamedu and the excavation of South Indian Stone Age and megalithic sites at Brahmavalli, Chandragiri, Maski and Porkalam during the 1950s. The journal also contained scholarly articles on archaeology and epigraphy. On the centenary of the founding of the ASI in 1961, the journal carried a short commemorative piece on the history of the Archaeological Survey of India authored by Sourindranath Roy.
