= Bhagwan Mahavir Government Museum =

Archaeological museum located in the Kadapa City of Andhra Pradesh

Coordinates: 14.4673541°N 78.8241339°E

- Established: 1982
- Location: Kadapa, Kadapa District, Andhra Pradesh, India

Bhagwan Mahavir Government Museum is an archaeological museum located in the Kadapa City of Andhra Pradesh. It was established in 1982 by the government to protect the ancient artifacts of archaeological importance. It was originally funded by a Jain businessman and was named after the founder of Jainism, Mahavira. The idols of Ganesha, Vishnu, Hanuman and Shiva are present inside the museum which date back to the period between the 5th and the 18th century. All these antiquities made of granite, dolomite, limestone, bronze icons were found in the excavations carried out at different places of Cuddapah, Hyderabad and Kurnool districts.
