= Chandavaram =

- Village
- Interactive map of Chandavaram
- Location in Andhra Pradesh, India
- Country: India
- State: Andhra Pradesh
- District: Palnadu
- Mandal: Muppalla

Government
  - Type: Panchayati raj
  - Body: Chandavaram gram panchayat

Area
  - Total: 1,151 ha (2,840 acres)

Population (2011)
  - Total: 5,174
  - Density: 449.5/km^{2} (1,164/sq mi)

Languages
  - Official: Telugu
- Time zone: UTC+5:30 (IST)
- PIN: 522549
- Area code: +91–8641
- Vehicle registration: AP

Chandavaram is a village in Palnadu district of the Indian state of Andhra Pradesh. It is located in Nadendla mandal of Narasaraopet revenue division.

== Governance ==
Chandavaram gram panchayat is the local self-government of the village. It is divided into wards and each ward is represented by a ward member.

== Education ==
As per the school information report for the academic year 2018–19, the village has a total of 5 MPP schools.

== See also ==
- List of villages in Palnadu district
