= Epigraphia Indica =

Archaeology journal

- Discipline: Archaeology, Indology
- Language: English

Publication details
- History: 1888–1977

Standard abbreviations
- ISO 4: Epigr. Indica

Indexing
- Epigraphia Indica
- OCLC no.: 1250198492
- Epigraphia Indica. Arabic and Persian supplement
- ISSN: 0013-9564

Epigraphia Indica was the official publication of the Archaeological Survey of India (ASI) from 1882 to 1977. The first volume was edited by James Burgess in the year 1882. Between 1892 and 1920 it was published as a quarterly supplement to The Indian Antiquary.

One part is brought out in each quarter year and eight parts make one volume of this periodical; so that one volume is released once in two years. About 43 volumes of this journal were published. They were edited by the officers who headed the Epigraphy Branch of ASI.

== Editors ==
- J. Burgess: Vol I (1882) & Vol II (1894)
- E. Hultzsch: Vol III (1894–95), Vol IV (1896–97), Vol V (1898–99), Vol VI (1900–01), Vol VII (1902–03), Vol VIII (1905–06), Vol IX (1907–08)
- Sten Konow: Vol X (1909–10), Vol XI (1911–12), Vol XII (1913–14), Vol XIII (1915–16)
- F. W. Thomas: Vol XIV (1917–18), Vol XV (1919–20), Vol XVI (1921–22)
- H. Krishna Sastri: Vol XVII (1923–24), Vol XVIII (1925–26), Vol XIX (1927–28)
- Hiranand Shastri: Vol XX (1929–30), Vol XXI (1931–32)
- N. P. Chakravarti: Vol XXII (1933–34), Vol XXIII (1935–36), Vol XXIV (1937–38), Vol XXV (1939–40), Vol XXVI (1941–42)
- N. Lakshminarayan Rao and B. Ch. Chhabra: Vol XXVII (1947–48)
- D. C. Sircar: Vol XXVIII (1949–50) - jointly with B. Ch. Chhabra), Vol XXX (1951–52) - jointly with N. Lakshminarayan Rao, Vol XXXI(1955–56), Vol XXXII(1957–58), Vol XXXIII(1959–60), Vol XXXIV(1960–61), Vol XXXV (1962–63), Vol XXXVI (1964–65)
- G. S. Gai: Vol XXXVII (1966–67), Vol XXXVIII, Vol XXXIX, Vol XL
- K. V. Ramesh: Vol XLI (1975–76), Vol XLII (1977–78)

== Other contributors ==
- August Hermann Francke
- Aurel Stein
- V. Venkayya
- Robert Sewell
- D. R. Bhandarkar
- J. Ph. Vogel
- F. O. Oertel
- N. K. Ojha
- F. E. Pargiter
- F. Kielhorn
- John Faithfull Fleet
- K. A. Nilakanta Sastri
- K. V. Subrahmanya Aiyar
- T. A. Gopinatha Rao

== Arabic and Persian supplement ==
The ASI also published an Arabic and Persian supplement from 1907 to 1977. While the first volume in 1907 was edited by E. Denison Ross of Calcutta Madrassa and the second and third volumes by Josef Horovitz, subsequent volumes have been edited by Ghulam Yazdani (1913–40), Maulvi M. Ashraf Hussain (1949–53) and Z. A. Desai (1953–77). Since 1946, the volumes have been edited by an Assistant Superintendent for Arabic and Persian Inscriptions, a special post created by the Government of India for the purpose.
