= Kashinath Narayan Dikshit =

Indian archaeologist (1889 – 1946)

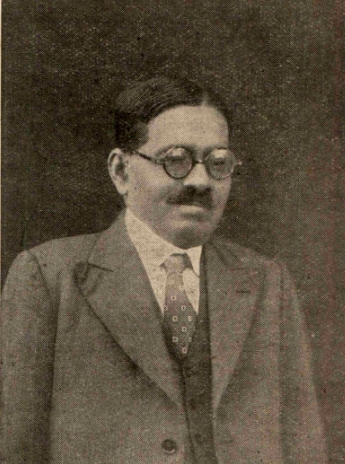

Rao Bahadur Kashinath Narayan Dikshit (21 October 1889 – 12 August 1946) was an Indian archaeologist who served as Director-general of the Archaeological Survey of India (ASI) from 1937 to 1944.

== Early life ==
Dikshit was born on 21 October 1889 in a Karhade Brahmin family of Pandharpur in the then Bombay Presidency (now Maharashtra, India).

== Career ==
Rao Bahadur Kashinath Narayan Dikshit (1889–1946) was Director-General of the Archaeological Survey of India (ASI) from 1937 to 1944, a critical period leading up to World War II and India's. He played a significant role in excavations at Taxila, Mohenjodaro, Harappa, and other sites across India, Pakistan, and Bangladesh. His meticulous work at Mohenjodaro is highly regarded, particularly his excavation of the DK area, which revealed significant insights into the Indus Civilization.

Dikshit is an Indian archaeologist who emerged from modest beginnings in Maharashtra. Young Dikshit had to provide for his family after his Mamlatdar father, Narayan Hari Dikshit, died from the plague. He had a strong education, doing particularly well in Sanskrit and taking home multiple awards and scholarships. Dikshit established scholarships, decentralized archaeological training, and supported museum modernization, among other contributions to archaeology.

== Retirement ==
He kept up his museology work after retiring and remained active in the Bhandarkar Oriental Research Institute. Future generations find inspiration in his life narrative, and his legacy lives on in the field of Indian archaeology. This story was written with assistance from Dikshit's great-granddaughter, Ms. Sarita Alurkar, and granddaughter, Dr. Veena Mandrekar. Dikshit's 1939 work "Prehistoric Civilization of the Indus Valley" is fully readable, and his archive has photos that are still being worked on to identify the people in it.Post-retirement, he continued his work in museology and was actively involved with the Bhandarkar Oriental Research Institute. His legacy endures in the field of Indian archaeology, and his life story is an inspiration to future generations.

== Family ==
Dr. Veena Mandrekar, Dikshit's granddaughter, and Ms. Sarita Alurkar, his great-granddaughter, contributed to this article. The full text of Dikshit's work, "Prehistoric Civilization of the Indus Valley" (1939), and photographs from his archive are available, with ongoing efforts to identify individuals in the images.

== Death ==
Dikshit retired in 1944 and was succeeded by Sir Mortimer Wheeler. He died on 12 August 1946 at age of 56 years and 10 months.

Preceded by J. F. Blakiston	Director General of the Archaeological Survey of India; 1937–1944	Succeeded by Mortimer Wheeler
