= Delhi Archaeological Society =

Organization

The Delhi Archaeological Society was an organisation active between the years 1847 and 1854 which focused on the history of the city of Delhi and its environs. Its first secretary was the editor of the Delhi Gazette, Henry Cope. It eventually grew to have around 120 members which included British scholars such as E. C. Bayley, Alexander Cunningham, Henry Elliot, and A. Sprenger. It also had Indians on its roll such as Nawab Zia-ud-din, Sayyid Ahmad Khan, and scholars of Delhi College. The society maintained a museum and a journal which published only two volumes (in 1850 and 1852).

The society conducted an excavation of Firuzabad in 1847 and undertook the repair of the Jantar Mantar observatory between 1852 and 1853. Its most notable contribution was a project to map Delhi's archaeological monuments and correlating them with references in Persian sources. One of the by-products of the Delhi Archaeological Society was an account of Delhi's historical buildings, places, and people, collated and published as Asar-us-Sanadid ("Remains of the Past") by Sayyid Ahmad Khan in 1847 followed by a second edition in 1854.
