= Ghulam Yazdani =

Indian archaeologist

Ghulam Yazdani OBE
- Born: 22 March 1885; Delhi, British India
- Died: 13 November 1962 (aged 77); Delhi, India
- Occupations: epigraphist, archaeologist
- Children: 7, including Zubaida Yazdani
- Awards: Padma Bhushan

Academic background
- Education: Muhammadan Anglo-Oriental College

Ghulam Yazdani, OBE (22 March 1885 – 13 November 1962) was an Indian archaeologist who was one of the founders of the Archaeological Department during the colonial era reign of Nizam of Hyderabad. He also edited the Arabic and Persian Supplement of Epigraphia Indica from 1913 to 1940. He was instrumental in surveying and documenting Islamic, Buddhist, Hindu and Jain sites in the Hyderabad state, including major mosques in the region, the caves at Ajanta, Ellora Caves, Alampur group of temples, Ramappa Temple, Bidar fort, and Daulatabad Fort, among many others.

Yazdani led archaeological surveys were periodically published as Annual Reports of the Archaeological Department of His Exalted Highness the Nizam's Dominions.

== Early life and career ==
Yazdani was born on 22 March 1885 in Delhi. He was educated under Rev. J. Godfrey F. Day and C.F. Andrews. The young Yazdani was also trained under Maulavi Mohammad Ishaq and Shamsul Ulama Maulavi Nazeer Ahmad. In 1903, he stood first in Aligarh Muslim University in his intermediate exams, and in 1905, he stood first in Arabic, Oriental Classics, and English in the B.A. exam, winning three gold medals: the Macleod medal, the Aitchison medal, and the F.S. Jamaluddin medal. He succeeded Josef Horovitz as the Epigraphist to the Government of India for Persian and Arabic inscriptions in 1915, and held that office till 1941. In 1907, he was appointed the Professor of Persian at St. Stephen's College in Delhi, and in 1909, H. Sharp (later Sir Henry Sharp) appointed him as the Professor of Arabic in the Government College at Rajshahi in Bengal. In 1913, the Government of Punjab appointed him as the Professor of Arabic at the Government College in Lahore.

== Director of the Archaeological Department of H.E.H. The Nizam's Dominions ==
Upon the recommendation of John Marshall, he was deputed to Hyderabad to organize the Archaeological Department of H.E.H the Nizam's Dominions (Hyderabad state) in 1914. He became the first Director of the department and served for 30 years till his retirement in 1943. In this capacity, he also edited the Annual Report of the Archaeological Department of His Exalted Highness The Nizam's Dominions.

Dr. Yazdani visited Bidar for the first time in 1915, drew up a comprehensive program for the thorough repair and conservation of the monuments at Bidar, and the work was carried out by the Government of Hyderabad State under Mir Osman Ali Khan, Asaf Jah VII, the Nizam of Hyderabad. He introduced an illustrated booklet, to serve as a guide-book titled The Antiquities of Bidar in 1917. Later, he completed his book Bidar: Its History and Monuments published by the Nizam’s Government and printed at Oxford University Press in 1947.

The work done by him on the preservation of monuments and exploration and excavation of relics of ancient civilization, particularly Ellora, Ajanta and Bidar, was well received not only in India but also in Europe and the United States of America, Dr. Yazdani wrote several books. He wrote about eight volumes on the work of Ajanta and Ellora before and after excavation and preservation. Dr. Yazdani received several honours such as being elected a Fellow of the Royal Asiatic Society, a Member of the Bhandarkar Oriental Research Institute, and an Honorary Fellow of Islamic Research Association, Bombay. He was involved with Osmania University right since its inception. In 1936, he was conferred the title of "Officer of the Distinguished Order of the British Empire" (O.B.E.). He also received several honorary doctorates from several universities. Finally, in recognition of his glorious service to history and archaeology, the Government of India conferred the award of Padma Bhushan in 1959. Dr. Yazdani was also a mentor to the next generation of scholars who worked on the Deccan, such as Haroon Khan Sherwani. Dr. Sherwani is best known for his two volume work co-edited with Purushottam Mahadev Joshi (Director, Bombay Archives) called History of Medieval Deccan.

== Later life ==
The Government of India awarded him the Padma Bhushan, then the second highest civilian award, in 1959. He died on 13 November 1962.

== Personal life ==
He married Badr Jahan Begum in 1909. They had two sons and five daughters.

== Bibliography ==
- Yazdani, Ghulam; Hussein, Shaikh Chand (1900). Mulk-i 'anbar : ya'ni saltanat-i nizam shahiyah. Hyderabad: Matbu`ah `Ahad-i Afrin.
- Yazdani, Ghulam (1917). The Antiquities of Bidar. Calcutta: Baptist Mission Press. ISBN 9788120605015.
- Yazdani, Ghulam (1922). The Temples at Palampet. Calcutta: Superintendent of Government Printing.
- Yazdani, Ghulam (1927). Guide to Ajanta Frescoes. Hyderabad: Archaeological Department.
- Yazdani, Ghulam (1929). Mandu: The City of Joy. 1929: Oxford University Press.
- Yazdani, Ghulam (1930–1955). Ajanta: the colour and monochrome reproductions of the Ajanta Frescoes based on photography. London: Oxford University Press.
- Yazdani, Ghulam, ed. (1936). The story of the Archaeological Department, 1914-1936: a souvenir of the Silver Jubilee of His Exalted Highness the Nizam. Hyderabad: Archaeological Department of H.E.H. The Nizam's Dominions.
- Yazdani, Ghulam (1947). Bidar: Its History and Monuments. London: Oxford University Press.
- Yazdani, Ghulam (1952). History of the Deccan (in three volumes). London, Bombay: Published under the authority of the government of Hyderabad by Oxford University Press.
- Yazdani, Ghulam (1960). The Early History of the Deccan (in two volumes). Oxford: Oxford University Press.
- COMMEMORATION VOLUME: Sherwani, H.K., ed. (1966). Dr. Ghulam Yazdani commemoration volume. Hyderabad: Maulana Abul Kalam Azad Oriental Research Institute.
