= Riwat =

Paleolithic site in Punjab, northern Pakistan

- Location within Pakistan
- 33.5°N 73.2°E
- Periods: Lower Palaeolithic
- Location: Soan Valley, Punjab

Site notes
- Archaeologists: Robin Dennell; Bridget Allchin; F. Raymond Allchin
- Discovered: 1983

Riwat (Rawat, Murree) is a Paleolithic site in Punjab, northern Pakistan. Another site, called Riwat Site 55, shows a later occupation dated to around 45,000 years ago.

== Site ==
The site was discovered in 1983. The artifacts consist of flakes and cores made of quartzite. The collection of pebble tools is claimed to be 1.9 million years old and has been disputed because the artifacts weren't found in their original context. The claims of the dating of the site are being continuously researched.

== Discovery ==
Riwat was discovered by the British Archaeological Mission to Pakistan, directed by F. Raymond Allchin and Bridget Allchin (1977–1987), and Robin Dennell (1988–1999). In the early 1980s, the mission set out to investigate the earliest periods in the prehistory of Pakistan, which at that point were only poorly understood, based on the work of Helmut de Terra and T. T. Paterson in the 1930s. One of the localities described by de Terra and Paterson was a place near the village of Rawat where artefact-bearing Pleistocene quartzite deposits could be found eroding out of the ridges and slopes of the Soan Valley. Revisiting the site, which they called Riwat Site 55, in 1983, the mission discovered prehistoric stone tools in good condition, and therefore decided to open an excavation, which was conducted over two seasons by Dennell and Pakistani archaeologist M. Halim. The site was dated to the Upper Palaeolithic, about 45,000 years ago.

At the same time, Dennell, together with geologist Helen Rendell, decided to survey the area around Riwat for more Palaeolithic sites. They noted several finds which appeared to be older than those at Site 55, perhaps indicating a Middle Palaeolithic or even Lower Palaeolithic occupation, but conclusively demonstrating that they were made by human hands, and that they were as old as suspected, proved difficult. In 1985, Rendell and Dennell published a paper in which they argued that some of the Riwat artefacts could be dated to the Lower Palaeolithic, between 400,000 and 700,000 years ago. Later, in 1988, they selected six artefacts which they argued were as much as two million years old, and therefore the earliest evidence of humans outside of Africa known at the time.

== Assemblage ==
The Lower Palaeolithic assemblage at Riwat consists of sixteen pieces of flaked stone that were found at the base of a deeply eroded gully. With the exception of handaxes, the stone tools used by hominins in this period (the Oldowan industry) were very simple, consisting of large flakes struck from a core with little preparation or forethought. As a result of this and their great age, they can be difficult to distinguish from pieces of stone that were flaked through natural processes, such as rolling down a slope. Dennell therefore analysed the Riwat assemblage for characteristic features of human modification: bulbs of percussion and ripple marks, indicating that significant force was applied to the core in a single place; a large number of flakes struck from the same core, using up a majority of the core's original surface; flakes struck from different directions; and retouch. Based on this analysis, he presented six pieces which he considered likely to be artefacts:

- R001 – a core with six or seven flakes removed, in different directions, leaving only 35% of the original surface untouched. It was found in situ with the flaked surfaces embedded in the gully side, ruling out the possibility that it had been flaked after eroding out of its original context.
- R008 – a small, retouched flake.
- R010 – a small flake.
- R011 – a core with two flakes removed.
- R013 – a large flake.
- R014 – a core with one very large flake and seven smaller flakes removed, with a clear bulb of percussion.

A further seven pieces were described as possibly manufactured by hominids, but "equivocal". In 1988 Dennell and his team revisited Riwat and found another flake (R88/1) that they considered likely to be artefactual. They were also able to document that out of more than 1,000 stones in the same deposit, none were flaked (indicating that they were not deposited in an environment where natural flaking was common).

== See also ==
- History of Pakistan
- Early human migration
- Oldowan
- Prehistoric Asia
- Madrasian culture
- Soanian
- South Asian Stone Age
