= Riwat Site 55 =

Archaeological site in Pakistan

- Location within Pakistan
- 33.5°N 73.2°E
- Periods: Upper Palaeolithic
- Location: Soan Valley, Punjab

Site notes
- Excavation dates: 1984–1985
- Archaeologists: Bridget Allchin; Robin Dennell; M. Halim
- Discovered: 1983

Riwat Site 55 is an Upper Palaeolithic archaeological site in the Soan Valley, near the village of Rawat in Punjab, Pakistan. It is approximately 45,000 years old and shows human occupation in Pakistan about 45–68,000 years ago.

== See also ==
- Riwat
