= Johanna van Lohuizen-de Leeuw =

Dutch archaeologist and art historian

- Born: Johanna Engelberta de Leeuw; 25 October 1919; Amsterdam, Netherlands
- Died: 8 December 1983 (aged 64); Amsterdam, Netherlands
- Occupations: Professor of Archaeology, University of Amsterdam
- Spouse: Jan van Lohuizen (m. 1943)

Academic background
- Education: Leiden University; Utrecht University
- Doctoral advisor: Jan Gonda

Academic work
- Discipline: Archaeology
- Sub-discipline: South and Southeast Asia
- Institutions: Cambridge University; Amsterdam University

Johanna Engelberta van Lohuizen-de Leeuw (née de Leeuw; 25 October 1919 – 8 December 1983) was a Dutch archaeologist and art historian, specializing in South and Southeast Asia. Fluent in Sanskrit, she contributed important research to the study of antiquities in Afghanistan, Pakistan, India, and Sri Lanka, as well as in Thailand and Indonesia. Along with Raymond and Bridget Allchin, Harold Bailey, and her husband Jan van Lohuizen, she founded the Ancient India and Iran Trust in Cambridge in 1978 to support historical and archaeological research in those regions, which later became a center of academic research in the field.

Van Lohuizen-de Leeuw made notable contributions to the history of Kusana art. She was active in conservation efforts to preserve the archaeological sites of Indus Valley settlements at Mohenjo Daro, working with UNESCO for this purpose. She was also a photographer and personally built an extensive collection of photographs of rare Asian artifacts, which is now housed in the University of Leiden.

== Early life and education ==
Johanna Engelberta de Leeuw was born on 25 October 1919 in Amsterdam, to Willem Carel de Leeuw and Margareta Lievina Muller, and spent part of her childhood in the United States. Her early education was in Baarn and Leiden. She went on to study archaeology and Sanskrit at the University of Leiden and later at the University of Utrecht, working with scholars such as F. B. J. Kuiper, J.Ph. Vogel, Nicholaas Johannes Krom, and Frederik David Kan Bosch. Her dissertation, supervised by Jan Gonda, studied art in the 'Scythian period' in North India, from the 1st century B.C. to the 3rd century A.D. During her studies, she also worked in several museums in Leiden, cataloguing Indian photos at the Kern Institute, researching Hindu Javanese antiquities in the Leiden Museum of Ethnology, and teaching Sanskrit at Groningen University.

== Career ==
She began her career teaching at Cambridge University in 1951, where she lectured on Indian art and archaeology. In 1958, she was appointed professor of archaeology at the University of Amsterdam, where she taught the early history of South and South-east Asia. She founded the Institute of South Asian Archaeology at the University of Amsterdam.

In 1978, along with Raymond Allchin, Bridget Allchin, Harold Bailey, and her husband, Jan van Lohuizen, she founded the Ancient India and Iran Trust in Cambridge, to promote study in South Asian and Iranian archaeology and art. In order to house the institute, they bought a house in which they shared their private collections and established a substantial library of books, materials, and items relating to South, and Central Asian art and archaeology. The Van Lohuizen library at the Institute now houses papers, archives, and research of Johanna van Lohuize-de Leeuw as well as Jan Van Lohuizen, and is an important archive of artifacts and scholarship, especially in Dutch, in the field.

Johanna van Lohuizen-de Leeuw's contributions to South Asian art and archaeology range over several periods, but she is chiefly remembered for her doctoral work on the Scythian period in North Indian art, as well as her work in establishing the roots of Kusana sculpture in the regions of Gandhara and Mathura. Her work was critical not only in establishing accurate chronologies, but also in tracing and demonstrating the influences of foreign cultures, especially of Hellenic art in depictions of the Buddha, and is now a widely accepted interpretation of the period. She is also considered to be an authority on the study of imagery depicting the Buddha.

Other research by her focused on antiquities in Sindh, on ivory sculptures from medieval Odisha, on the history and art of stupas, and Rajput sculpture and paintings, and include an extensive list of publications including over 80 academic articles and several books. Her research helped identify several artistic reliefs in Sri Lanka, especially at archaeological sites in Isurumuniya, and in Indonesia. She worked with UNESCO to conserve archaeological sites at Mohenjo Daro. She was the editor of a number of notable academic publications, including Studies in South Asian Culture from 1969 to 1993 and Handbuch der Orientalistik, Kunst und Archäologie from 1970 to 1992. At the European Association of South Asian Archaeaeology and Art, she established biennial conferences for the field to promote academic dialogue and was elected the president for these conferences.

Between 1956 and 1983, she built an extensive personal collection of black and white photographs of ancient Asian artifacts, documented from her visits to archaeological sites as well as recording artifacts in public and private collections that she had accessed. She was instrumental in encouraging her colleagues to also make such photographic records of their work, and collaborated with professional photographers like Josephine Powell to photograph and document Asian art and artifacts. Her entire collection, comprising over 30,000 images, was housed during her lifetime at the Institute of South Asian Archaeology in Amsterdam, but is now situated at the University of Leiden, at the Kern Institute.

== Personal life and death ==
She married fellow historian Jan van Lohuizen in 1943. They did not have any children. She died of a hemorrhage in 1983, in Amsterdam.

== Bibliography ==
Selected works by Johanna van Lohuizen-de Leeuw include:

- van Lohuizen-de Leeuw, Johanna (1949). The "Scythian" Period. An approach to the history, art, epigraphy and palaeography of North India from the 1st century B.C. to the 3rd century A.D. Leiden: Brill. OCLC 752478724.
- van Lohuizen-de Leeuw, Johanna (1975). The pre-Muslim antiquities of Sind. Leiden: South Asian Archaeology. OCLC 911532679.
- van Lohuizen-de Leeuw, Johanna (1960). De protohistorische culturen van Voor-Indië en hun datering (in Dutch). Leiden: Brill. OCLC 7558727.
