= J. P. Joshi =

Indian archaeologist (born 1932)

Jagat Pati Joshi (born 14 July 1932) is an Indian archaeologist who discovered the Indus Valley sites of Dholavira and Surkotada. Joshi served as the Director General of the Archaeological Survey of India (ASI) from 1987 to 1990. However, it is now widely known that the Dholavira site was discovered by geologist Shambhudan Ghadvi.

== Early life and education ==
Joshi was born at Almora, United Provinces on 14 July 1932 and educated at Lucknow University where he obtained his M. A. in Ancient History and Culture in 1954. Joshi did his P. G. Diploma from the School of Archaeology of the Archaeological Survey of India in 1961.

== Career ==
Joshi served in the ASI from 1956 to 2001. Joshi discovered the Indus Valley site of Dholavira in 1966 and excavated Malvan along with F. Raymond Allchin. He also excavated the Harappan site of Surkotada.

In 1987, Joshi succeeded M. S. Nagaraja Rao as Director General of the ASI and served till 1990. When archaeologist M. C. Joshi was replaced with civil servant Achala Moulik in 1993 in the wake of the demolition of the Babri Masjid, Joshi was chosen as an advisor to Moulik. However, Joshi resented a civil servant at the helm of affairs in the ASI and differences arose. As a result, the post of advisor was abolished in 1995.

== See also ==
- Shambhudan Gadhvi

Preceded by M. S. Nagaraja Rao	Director General of the Archaeological Survey of India; 1987 - 1989	Succeeded by M. C. Joshi
