= Shambhudan Gadhvi =

Geologist from Gujarat who discovered the Indus valley site of Dholavira

Shambhudan Gadhvi is a former master clerk and amateur geologist from Gujarat who discovered the Indus valley site of Dholavira in the early 1960s.

== Discovery of Dholavira ==
During the Kutch famine in 1960s, Shambhudan Gadhvi was supervising on a drought relief work at Kotda (1 km (0.62 mi) from the Dholavira site) when he found Harappan seals with the shape of animals.

While supervising the digging of a small dam to collect the monsoon waters, he discovered numerous artifacts; prominent among them were fragments of Indus seals. He recognized that the seals belonged to the Harappan civilization by comparing it to the pictures that he found in his son's history textbook issued by the Gujarat government. He subsequently searched for more seals and collected numerous artifacts — decorative ceramics, fragments of carnelian beads, and metal objects.

Shambhudan preserved the ancient relics in his house and also sent many relics to Kutch University. He collected some beads, pottery shards, and artefacts from the Dholavira site and went to the curator of Kutch Museum in Bhuj and reported the site to the Archaeological Survey of India (Archaeology Department).

Gadhvi also published the news of the discovery in Kutchmitra at Bhuj to garner official support from the government.

== Excavation ==
Due to the continued efforts of Shambhudan Gadhvi, excavation work finally began in 1990 and lasted until 2005. The government of India started research in Kotda. Under the observation of Ravindra Singh Bist, in around three years, they found a town. It revealed a city that had a citadel, an intermediate city, a lower town, fresh water reservoirs, underground sewage pipes, bead-making workshops, copper smelters, etc.

R. S. Bisht was the first ASI official to visit the site in the mid-1980s. By that time, Gadhvi had the backyard of his house laden with artifacts, ceramics, and structural members from the site. Gadhvi has been an important collaborator with RS Bisht in the late 1980s, when extensive exploration work was underway in the area to map the settlement of Khadir Island, where Dholavira is located. Shambhudan also contacted people in other villages to help ASI discover more sites. Once the excavation work began in 1990, Gadhvi assisted the ASI to set up the camp and recruit laborers from the village of Dholavira for the first season of excavation.

== Recognition ==
Despite Shambhudan's efforts at bringing light to the discovery of Dholavira, his work remained unacknowledged by the state government and the ASI. The credit of the discovery of Dholavira was instead given to J. P. Joshi.
