= B. K. Thapar =

Indian archaeologist (1921–1995)

Bal Krishen Thapar
- Born: 18 October 1921
- Died: 6 September 1995 (aged 73)
- Education: University of Punjab, Lahore; Heidelberg University
- Known for: Director-general of the Archaeological Survey of India (1978–1981), Founder of INTACH
- Scientific career
- Fields: Archaeology
- Workplaces: Archaeological Survey of India

Bal Krishen Thapar (18 October 1921 – 6 September 1995) was an Indian archaeologist who served as the Director-general of the Archaeological Survey of India from 1978 to 1981. He was the founder of INTACH.

== Early life ==
Thapar was born to a cloth merchant in Ludhiana on 18 October 1921. On completing his M.A. in History from the University of Punjab, Lahore, Thapar joined the Archaeological Survey of India and trained under Mortimer Wheeler at the newly established Institute of Archaeology in Taxila. Thapar obtained a doctorate in West Asian archaeology from the Heidelberg University.

== In the Archaeological Survey of India ==
Thapar participated in the archaeological excavations in Kalibangan, Purana Qila and Maski. He was also involved in the ASI's excavations at Farah Valley and Begram in Afghanistan. Other excavations he conducted and led include archaeological projects at Hastinapur, Sisupalgarh, Rupnagar, Kausambi, Porkalam, Somnath, Prakash, Kuchai, and Juna Pani.

Thapar edited the Archaeological Survey of India's official journals Indian Archaeology from 1973 to 1979 and Purattatva from 1974 to 1978. In 1978, Thapar succeeded M. N. Deshpande as the director-general of the ASI and served till retirement in 1981.

== Professional memberships ==
Thapar was a member of many academic bodies, both in India and abroad, including:

- Chairman, Centre for Cultural Resources & Training (1982–92)
- Secretary and Founding Member, Indian National Trust for Art & Cultural Heritage (1986–94)
- Member, Advisory Committee, American Institute of Indian Studies (1988–94)
- Vice President, Executive Committee, ICOMOS (1975–84)
- Member, Permanent Council, Congress Internationale des Sciences Prehistoriques et Protohistoriques
- Member, Indian National Committee for cooperation with UNESCO (1987–91)
- Member International Editorial Committee of UNESCO – Projects on Scientific & Cultural History of Mankind and History of Civilisation of Central Asia
- Member, UNESCO Consultative Committee on Silk Roads & Roads of Dialogue project
- Correspondent Member, German Archaeological Institute at Berlin
- Secretary, Central Advisory Board of Archaeology in India
- Member, Indian Science Congress Association
- Member, Radiocarbon Dating Committee

== Fellowships and awards ==
In 1992, Thapar was awarded the Padma Shri for Literature and Education by the Government of India. Thapar was awarded the Alexander von Humboldt Scholarship in 1959. In 1993, he was awarded the Asiatic Society of Bengal medal, and the Jawaharlal Nehru Centenary Medal. Thapar was also a Royal Asiatic Society of Great Britain and Ireland Fellow; Churchill College Fellow (1971), and a Jawaharlal Nehru Memorial Fellow (1981).

== Death ==
Thapar died at New Delhi on 6 September 1995.

== Selected publications ==
Indian megaliths in Asian context - with Arun Kumar Sharma (1994)

Conservation of the Indian heritage - with Bridget Allchin and Frank Raymond Allchin (1989)

Recent archaeological discoveries in India (1985)

Approaches to the Archaeological Heritage Chapter 7, India - Henry Cleere (1984)

History of Humanity: Scientific and Cultural Development. Book Chapter: The Indus Valley: 3000-1500 BC. Dani, A. H. and Mohan, J.-P. (eds.), Vol. II UNESCO and Rutledge: 246-265 - with Mohammed Rafique Mughal (1996)

Preceded by M. N. Deshpande	Director General of the Archaeological Survey of India; 1978 - 1981	Succeeded by Debala Mitra
