= M. S. Nagaraja Rao =

Indian archaeologist (1932 – 2011)

Mirle Srinivasa Nagaraja Rao
- Born: 3 June 1932; Mandya, Karnataka
- Died: 24 December 2011 (aged 79); Mysore, Karnataka
- Education: PhD in Archaeology from University of Poona
- Occupation: Archaeologist
- Known for: Director General of ASI (1984-87)

Mirle Srinivasa Nagaraja Rao (3 June 1932 – 24 December 2011) was an Indian archaeologist who served as the Director General of the Archaeological Survey of India (ASI) from 1984 to 1987.

== Early life and education ==
Born in Mandya on 3 June 1932, obtained a master's degree in Indology from the University of Mysore and a Ph.D. in Archaeology from the University of Poona. After obtaining his doctorate, Rao joined the Karnataka State Department of Archaeology as an epigraphist. In 1957, he was appointed an exploration assistant in the ASI. During his early days in the ASI, Rao was trained by archaeologist M. N. Deshpande.

== Career ==
Rao served as exploration assistant in the ASI from 1957 to 1964 and curator of the Museum of Art and Archaeology, Karnatak University, Dharwad from 1964 to 1972. In 1972, he was appointed head of the Karnataka State Archaeology Department and he served till 1983 when he was selected to succeed Debala Mitra as Director General of the ASI. Rao served as Director General from 1984 to 1987 and was involved in the excavation of Hampi between 1979 and 1988.

== Death ==
Rao died at Mysore on 24 December 2011 after a prolonged illness.

Preceded by Debala Mitra	Director General of the Archaeological Survey of India; 1984 - 1987	Succeeded by J. P. Joshi
