= Achala Moulik =

Indian writer (born 1941)

Achala Moulik (born 1 July 1941 in Calcutta, India) is an Indian writer and former bureaucrat who served as Education Secretary to the Government of India, Director General of the Archaeological Survey of India from 1993 to 1994 and Additional Chief Secretary to the Government of Karnataka from January to June 2001. In 2013, Moulik won the Sergey Yessenin Prize for promoting Russian literature.

== Early life and education ==
Born in a well-to-do Bengali family on 1 July 1941 in Calcutta, India. Moulik studied in the United States, UK and Italy graduating from the London University. On completion of her studies, Moulik wrote the Indian Civil Service examination and joined the Indian Administrative Service in 1964.

== Civil service ==
Moulik served in the IAS until her retirement in 2001. She served as joint secretary in the Department of Education and Youth Services and director of the Karnataka State Archives. When the then director general of the ASI, archaeologist M. C. Joshi, resigned owning responsibility for ASI's failure to protect Babri Masjid, a protected monument, from demolition, the government of India appointed Moulik to succeed him. Achala Moulik was the first Indian Administrative Service officer to occupy the post.

The appointment of Moulik as director general triggered a protest from professional archaeologists in the survey who felt that only a professional archaeologist was suitable enough for the post. To placate them, the government appointed ex-Director General J. P. Joshi as special adviser to Moulik. But the arrangement did not work due to personal rivalry between the two. Joshi mustered support from the archaeologists in the ASI and tried to oust Moulik, but the government responded by dismissing Joshi instead. Moulik was transferred to Karnataka after a short term and succeeded by S. K. Mahapatra. The ASI continued to be led by civil servants until 2013.

Moulik served as Additional Chief Secretary to the Government of Karnataka from January to June 2001. On the retirement of the then Chief Secretary S. K. Bhattacharya, Moulik was offered the post but she declined the offer and eventually retired.

== Writing career ==
Since her retirement in 2001, Moulik has been writing books, both fiction and non-fiction, and translating works of foreign authors.

Preceded by M. C. Joshi	Director General of the Archaeological Survey of India; 1993 - 1994	Succeeded by S. K. Mahapatra
