= Dholavira =

Indus Valley Civilisation site in Gujarat, India

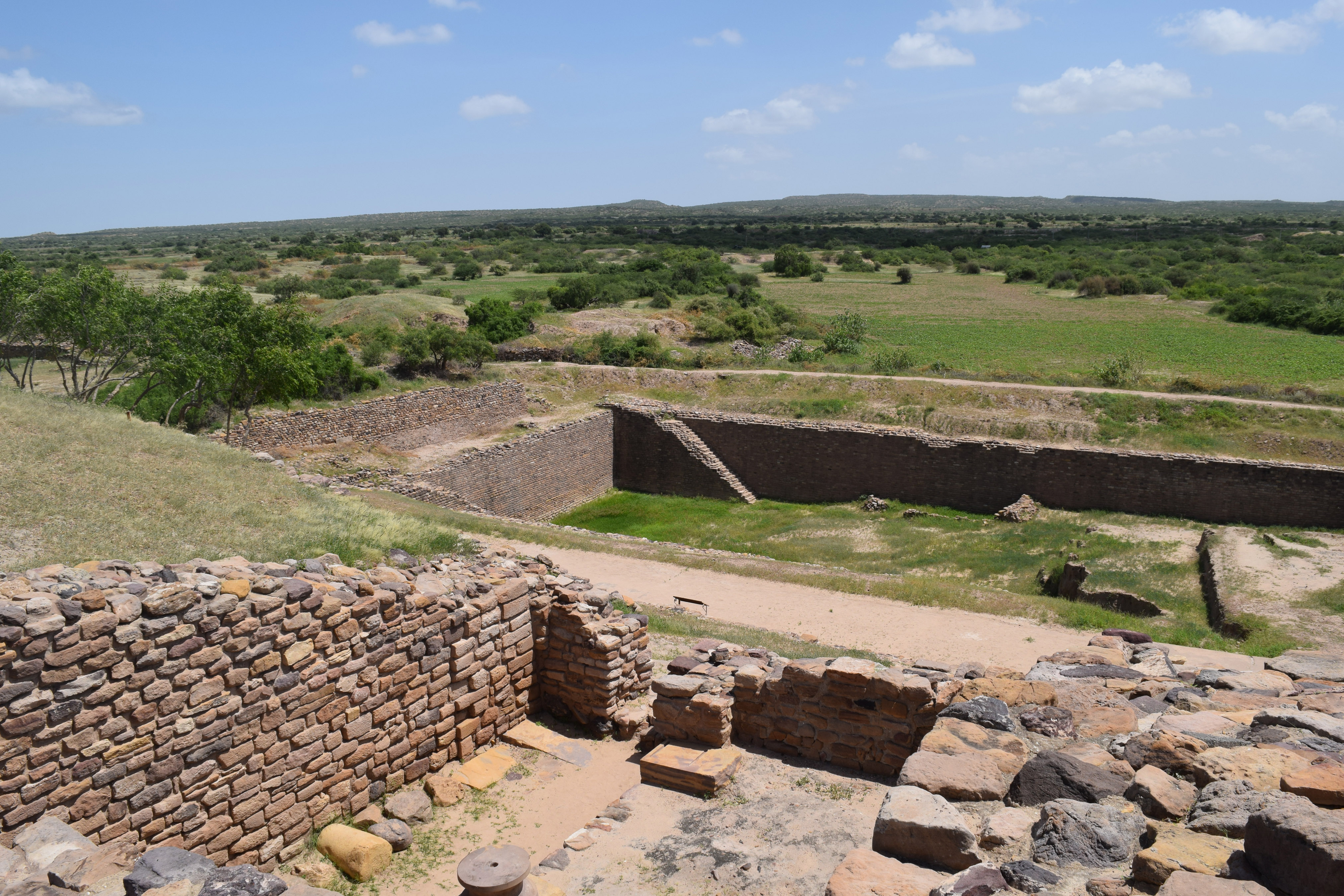
- The site in 2016

- Location in Gujarat, India
- 23°53′18.98″N 70°12′49.09″E
- Type: Settlement
- Periods: Harappa 1 to Harappa 5
- Cultures: Indus Valley Civilisation
- Location: Gujarat, India

History
- Built: c. 2650 BC
- Abandoned: c. 1900 BC

Site notes
- Area: 47 ha (120 acres)
- Condition: Ruined
- Public access: Yes

UNESCO World Heritage Site
- Official name: Dholavira: A Harappan City
- Criteria: Cultural: (iii)(iv)
- Designated: 2021 (44th session)
- Reference no.: 1645
- Region: Southern Asia

Dholavira (Gujarati: ધોળાવીરા, IPA: [d̪ʰoɭaʋiɾaː]) is an archaeological site at Khadirbet in Bhachau Taluka of Kutch District, in the state of Gujarat, western India, which is named after a modern-day village 1 kilometre (0.62 mi) south of it. This village is 165 km (103 mi) from Radhanpur. Also known locally as Kotada timba, the site contains ruins of a city of the ancient Indus Valley Civilization. Earthquakes have repeatedly affected Dholavira, including a particularly severe one around 2600 BCE.

== Location ==
Dholavira's location is on the Tropic of Cancer. It is one of the five largest Harappan sites and the most prominent archaeological site in India belonging to the Indus Valley Civilization. It is located on Khadir Bet island in the Kutch Desert Wildlife Sanctuary in the Great Rann of Kutch. The 47 ha (120 acres) quadrangular city lay between two seasonal streams, the Mansar in the north and Manhar in the south. The site is believed to have been occupied from c. 2650 BCE, declining slowly after around 2100 BCE, and to have been briefly abandoned then reoccupied until c. 1450 BCE; however, recent research suggests the beginning of occupation around 3500 BCE (pre-Harappan) and continuity until around 1800 BCE (early part of Late Harappan period).

== Discovery ==
The site was initially discovered by a resident of Dholavira village, Shambhudan Gadhvi, in the early 1960s, who made efforts to bring government attention to the location. The site was "officially" discovered in 1967 or 1968 by J. P. Joshi, of the Archaeological Survey of India (ASI), and is the fifth largest of eight major Harappan sites. It has been under excavation since 1990 by the ASI, which opined that "Dholavira has indeed added new dimensions to the understanding of the Indus Valley Civilization."

Dholavira has been marked as one of the most important megalithic sites of Kutch, while the only other known megalithic site in Kutch is located near the village of Dhaneti.

The other major Harappan sites discovered so far are Harappa, Mohenjo-daro, Ganeriwala, Rakhigarhi, Kalibangan, Rupnagar and Lothal.

It was named as a UNESCO World Heritage Site under the name Dholavira: a Harappan City on 27 July 2021.

== Timeline ==
Layout of Dholavira

Ravindra Bisht, the director of the Dholavira excavations, has defined the following seven stages of occupation at the site:

Stages	Time	Events
Stage I	2650–2550 BCE	Early Harappan – Mature Harappan Transition A
Stage II	2550–2500 BCE	Early Harappan – Mature Harappan Transition B
Stage III	2500–2200 BCE	Mature Harappan A
Stage IV	2200–2000 BCE	Mature Harappan B
Stage V	2000–1900 BCE	Mature Harappan C
	1900–1850 BCE	Period of desertion
Stage VI	1850–1750 BCE	Posturban Harappan A
	1750–1650 BCE	Period of desertion
Stage VII	1650–1450 BCE	Posturban Harappan B

Recent C14 datings and stylistic comparisons with Amri II-B period pottery show the first two phases should be termed Pre-Harappan Dholaviran Culture and re-dated as follows: Stage I (c. 3500-3200 BCE), and Stage II (c. 3200-2600 BCE).

== Excavations ==
The excavation was initiated in 1989, by the ASI under the direction of Bisht, and there were 13 field excavations between 1990 and 2005. The excavation brought to light urban planning and architecture, and unearthed large numbers of antiquities such as animal bones, gold, silver, terracotta ornaments, pottery and bronze vessels. Archaeologists believe that Dholavira was an important centre of trade between settlements in south Gujarat, Sindh and Punjab and Western Asia.

== Architecture ==
Estimated to be older than the port-city of Lothal, the city of Dholavira has a rectangular shape and organization, and is spread over 22 ha (54 acres). The area measures 771.1 m (2,530 ft) in length, and 616.85 m (2,023.8 ft) in width. Unlike Harappa and Mohenjo-daro, the city was constructed to a pre-existing geometrical plan consisting of three divisions – the citadel, the middle town, and the lower town. The acropolis and the middle town had been furnished with their own defence-work, gateways, built-up areas, street system, wells, and large open spaces. The acropolis is the most thoroughly fortified and complex area in the city, of which it appropriates the major portion of the southwestern zone. The towering "castle" stands is defended by double ramparts. Next to this stands a place called the 'bailey' where important officials lived. The city within the general fortifications accounts for 48 ha (120 acres). There are extensive structure-bearing areas which are outside yet integral to the fortified settlement. Beyond the walls, another settlement has been found. The most striking feature of the city is that all of its buildings, at least in their present state of preservation, are built of stone, whereas most other Harappan sites, including Harappa itself and Mohenjo-Daro, are almost exclusively built of brick. Dholavira is flanked by two storm water channels; the Mansar in the north, and the Manhar in the south. In the town square, there is an area high above the ground, called the "Citadel''.

=== Reservoirs ===
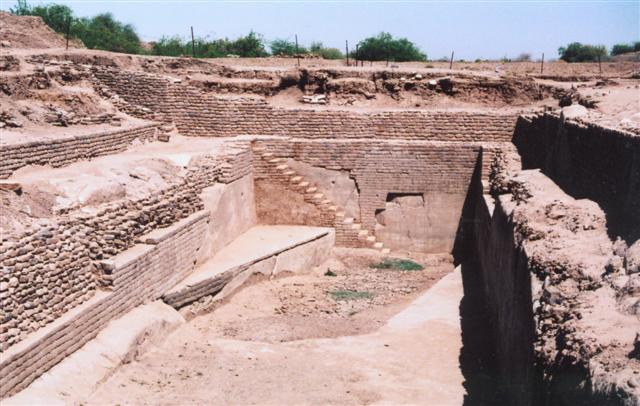
One of the water reservoirs, with steps, at Dholavira

Bisht, who retired as the Joint Director-General of the ASI, said, "The kind of efficient system of Harappans of Dholavira, developed for conservation, harvesting and storage of water speaks eloquently about their advanced hydraulic engineering, given the state of technology in the third millennium BCE." One of the unique features of Dholavira is the sophisticated water conservation system of channels and reservoirs, the earliest found anywhere in the world, built completely of stone. The city had massive reservoirs, three of which are exposed. They were used for storing fresh water brought by rains or to store water diverted from two nearby rivulets. This clearly came in response to the desert climate and conditions of Kutch, where several years may pass without rainfall. A seasonal stream which runs in a north–south direction near the site was dammed at several points to collect water. In 1998, another reservoir was discovered in the site.

The inhabitants of Dholavira created sixteen or more reservoirs of varying size during Stage III. Some of these took advantage of the slope of the ground within the large settlement, a drop of 13 metres (43 ft) from northeast to northwest. Other reservoirs were excavated, some into living rock. Recent work has revealed two large reservoirs, one to the east of the castle and one to its south, near the Annexe.

The reservoirs are cut through stone vertically, and are about 7 m (23 ft) deep and 79 m (259 ft) long. They skirt the city, while the citadel and bath are centrally located on raised ground. There is also a large well with a stone-cut trough connecting it to a drain meant for conducting water to a storage tank. The bathing tank had steps descending inwards.

In October 2014, excavation began on a rectangular stepwell which measured 73.4 m (241 ft) long, 29.3 m (96 ft) wide, and 10 m (33 ft) deep, making it three times bigger than the Great Bath of Mohenjedaro.

=== Check Dams ===
The check dams of Dholavira represent a sophisticated hydraulic engineering system constructed to capture and store monsoon water, enabling the civilization to thrive within the arid environment of Khadir Island in the Rann of Kutch. Built across the seasonal Manhar and Mansar streams that flank the city, these barriers were positioned upstream to withstand manageable currents while preventing flash floods from draining into the salt flats. Excavations have revealed multiple parallel walls and heavy non-local cut-stone blocks reinforcing the riverbeds, which successfully slowed rushing torrents and broke the force of high volume flows. The retained water was managed through plastered bounding walls and elevated inlet channels that funneled the supply via covered stone-masonry feeder networks into an extensive system of reservoirs, while city fortifications simultaneously doubled as supportive bunds and excess overflow was directed toward a southwest lake to maximize conservation during severe droughts.

=== Drainage ===
The drainage system of Dholavira demonstrates a sophisticated achievement in civil and hydraulic engineering, characterized by an elaborate infrastructure designed to manage storm water and monsoon runoff while maintaining strict separation from domestic sewage. The most intricate storm water network was discovered within the Castle, featuring underground drains that ranged from small feeder channels to arterial passageways large enough for a person to walk through. Rainwater from the gates and fortifications was channeled through vertical conduits into underground chambers and major drains, flowing westward via stone cascades and right-angled turns beneath the broad-ways before piercing the western wall to empty into a dedicated earthen reservoir in the Bailey. To ensure efficiency and prevent stagnation, these drains incorporated calculated gradients, smooth flooring, sturdy sidewalls, capstones, air ducts, and manholes at key junctions, often constructed using specialized limestone blocks scooped into channels and covered with flat stone slabs. Meanwhile, domestic sanitation was carefully segregated from this freshwater network, with household wastewater managed through street-side ceramic jars, stone sanitary tanks, and soakage pits in the Middle and Lower Towns.

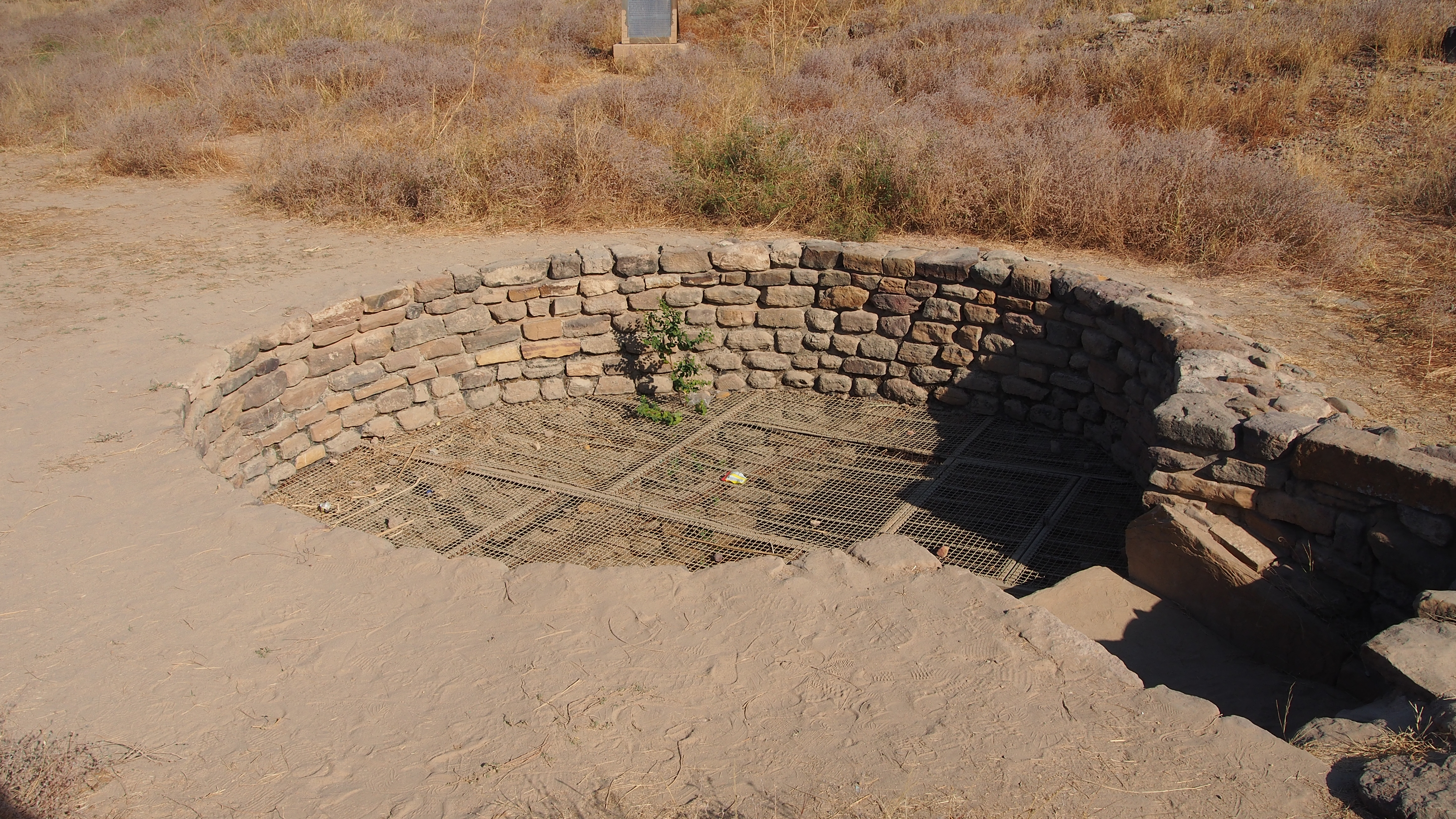
The Well at ancient Harappan city of Dholavira

=== Other structures and objects ===
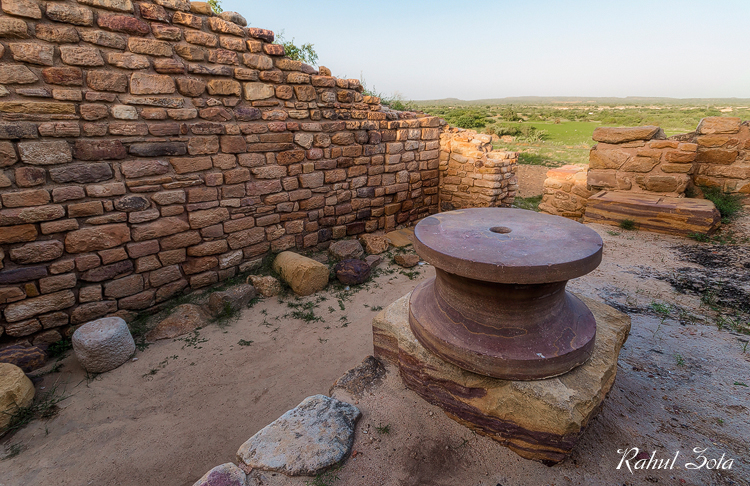
East gate

A huge circular structure on the site is believed to be a grave or memorial, although it contained no skeletons or other human remains. The structure consists of ten radial mud-brick walls built in the shape of a spoked wheel. A soft sandstone sculpture of a male with phallus erectus but head and feet below ankle truncated was found in the passageway of the eastern gate. Many funerary structures have been found (although all but one were devoid of skeletons), as well as pottery pieces, terra cotta seals, bangles, rings, beads, and intaglio engravings. The Dancing Girl is one of the most iconic artifacts from the Harappan civilization, discovered at Mohenjo-daro. Believed to date back to around 2500 BCE, this bronze statue stands at about 10.5 centimeters tall and vividly captures the dynamic energy and grace of a youthful dancer.

=== Hemispherical constructions ===
Seven hemispherical constructions were found at Dholavira, of which two were excavated in detail, which were constructed over large rock cut chambers. Having a circular plan, these were big hemispherical elevated mud brick constructions. One of the excavated structures was designed in the form of a spoked wheel. The other was also designed in same fashion, but as a wheel without spokes. Although they contained burial goods of pottery, no skeletons were found except for one grave, where a skeleton and a copper mirror were found. A necklace of steatite beads strung to a copper wire with hooks at both ends, a gold bangle, gold and other beads were also found in one of the hemispherical structures.

The Archaeological Survey of India, which conducted the excavation, opines that these “hemispherical structures remind one of early Buddhist stupas.” and that "the kind of design that is of spoked wheel and unspoked wheel also remind one of the Sararata-chakra-citi and sapradhi-rata-chakra-citi mentioned in the Satapatha Brahmana and Shulba Sutrass".

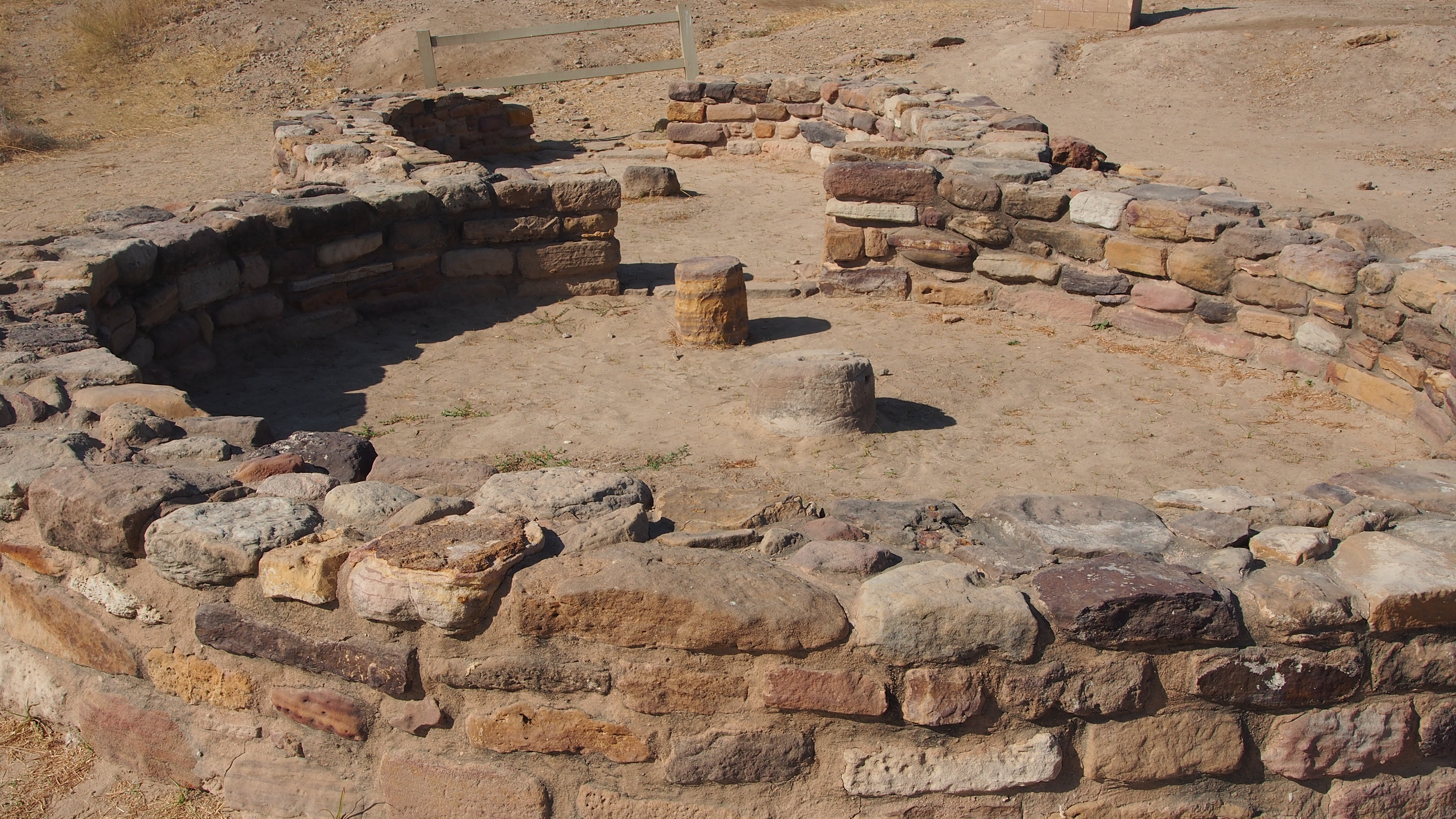
Circular houses of Dholavira - an ancient Harappan City

== Findings ==
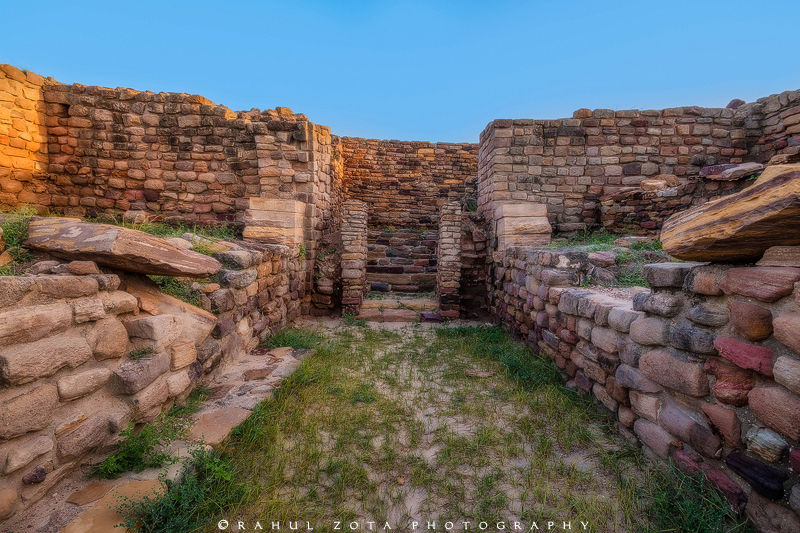
North gate

Painted Indus black-on-red-ware pottery, square stamp seals, seals without Indus script, a huge signboard measuring about 3 m (9.8 ft) in length, containing ten letters of Indus script. One poorly preserved seated male figure made of stone has also been found, comparable to high quality two stone sculptures found at Harappa. Large black-slipped jars with pointed base were also found at this site. A giant bronze hammer, a big chisel, a bronze hand-held mirror, a gold wire, gold ear stud, gold globules with holes, copper celts and bangles, shell bangles, phallus-like symbols of stone, square seals with Indus inscription and signs, a circular seal, humped animals, pottery with painted motifs, goblets, dish-on-stand, perforated jars, Terracotta tumblers in good shape, architectural members made of ballast stones, grinding stones, mortars, etc., were also found at this site. Stone weights of different measures were also found.

=== Seals ===
Excavations at the ancient city of Dholavira uncovered 225 seals and 60 clay impressions. Archaeologists found that the use of seals changed through different periods of the city's history. In the earliest layers, no seals or writing were used, though some potters marked their work. During the early formative phase, the first small stone seal appeared, featuring a carved scene of a figure in a tree and a kneeling worshipper, which matches similar carvings found at other ancient Indus Valley sites. During the peak period of the city, the number of seals increased significantly. Most of these were square stone stamps with an animal carved on the front and writing across the top. The unicorn was the most common animal shown, appearing on 65% of them, though others like the buffalo, elephant, and rhinoceros also appeared. Most seals were carved from soft soapstone, coated, and heated to high temperatures to make them hard and durable.

=== Beads ===
Excavations at the site revealed a major bead-making industry that yielded around 12,000 stone and metal beads. Steatite was the most common material used, making up over a quarter of the total, followed by terracotta and agate carnelian. Craftsmen also worked with jasper, lapis lazuli, turquoise, vesuvianite, gold, silver, copper, and shell.

The Middle Town area was the main center for this production, yielding over 40% of the recovered beads. Excavators found specialized workshops in this zone containing stone polishers, anvils, and unfinished stone shapes. Bead production relied on stone drill bits made of a hard rock called ernestite, which allowed craftspeople to drill through hard gemstones.

Raw materials were brought from regional sites in Gujarat, such as Khandik, Mardak Bet, and Ratanpur, as well as through long-distance trade routes, such as lapis lazuli from Badakhshan. Craftsmen produced items such as long cylindrical carnelian beads and decorated carnelian beads for trade. These items were distributed across regional trade networks, appearing in graves at Harappa, and exported to Mesopotamia, where historical records mention carnelian from the region. Bead production continued throughout the history of Dholavira, starting in its earliest phases, reaching its peak during the main urban period.

=== Drill Bits ===
The collection of stone drill bits found at Dholavira is the largest assemblage of bead-drilling tools recovered from an Indus Valley Civilization site. Excavation records document between 1,500 and 1,600 specimens at the location. In comparison, site excavations yielded 65 drill bits made of ernestite at Harappa, and smaller quantities at Chanhudaro.

Analyses of a representative sample of 1,212 drill bits show that 99.17 percent were crafted from ernestite. Chert accounted for 0.66 percent, all of which were fashioned from flakes or parallel-sided blades with single or double ridges and showed no signs of use. A small fraction, 0.165 percent, consisted of vesuvianite-grossular garnet. The abundance of ernestite tools and raw materials suggests that craftsmen sourced the material from the surrounding Kutch or Gujarat region. X-ray diffraction and electron microprobe analyses show that the material consists of quartz, sillimanite-mullite, and iron-titanium oxide phases. With a Mohs hardness between 7 and 8 and a specific gravity of 2.8 to 3.2, ernestite resists high friction and heat. The strength of ernestite enabled artisans to drill through hard stones such as agate-carnelian, jasper, chalcedony, and bloodstone.

Drill bits at Dholavira fall into three primary classifications. Tapered cylindrical bits make up 56.2 percent of analyzed tools, Cylindrical bits account for 23.1 percent, and constricted cylindrical bits make up 19.1 percent. Complete drill bits vary from 6.33 to 30.89 millimeters in length, with an average width of 2.79 millimeters.

=== Weights and measures ===
Archaeologists documented between 994 and 996 weight specimens at the site. Unlike most Harappan settlements where chert was the main material used for weights; Dholavira craftsmen used 55 different raw materials. Shell was the most common material, accounting for 236 specimens or 23.8 percent of the total. Researchers attribute this high reliance on shell to the settlement's coastal location and local shell industry.

Other raw materials used for making weights included sandstone (148 specimens, or 14.9 percent), chert including banded Rohri chert (135 specimens, or 13.6 percent), unidentified stone (98 specimens, or 9.9 percent), agate (85 specimens, or 8.6 percent), terracotta (73 specimens, or 7.3 percent), limestone (50 specimens, or 5.0 percent), basalt (29 specimens, or 2.9 percent), jasper (26 specimens, or 2.6 percent), black stone (21 specimens, or 2.1 percent), and copper (21 specimens, or 2.1 percent). Smaller numbers of lead, chalcedony, and additional jasper weights were also recovered.

Standard Harappan weights were usually cube shaped. While cube-shaped weights were the most frequent form at Dholavira with 393 specimens, the site contained a wide variety of shapes. These included 124 rounded spherical weights, 91 cylindrical weights, and 89 disc-shaped weights. Archaeologists also identified 78 unshaped or irregular stone and shell pieces and 46 pebble weights. Minor varieties included tabloid, conical, bar, bar, barrel, pyramidal, and triangular shapes. The weights at Dholavira follow the traditional Harappan measurement system analyzed by scholar A.S. Hemmy. The base unit for this system centered on an average mass of roughly 13.63 grams. The system increased both in binary steps (1, 2, 4, 8, 16, 32, 64) and decimal steps (160, 200, 320, 640, 1600). The physical weights span a wide range of masses. The smallest weights range from 0.07 grams to 0.083 grams, which were likely used for measuring precious metals or gemstones. The largest weights range from 12,460 grams up to 13,922 grams, which were likely intended for large bulk transactions.

Of the 615 weights recorded by location across the city, the largest portion came from the Middle Town with 278 specimens (45.2 percent), supporting the view that this area served as the main market and manufacturing district. Of the 470 weights dated by archaeological layer, 74.4 percent belong to the Mature Harappan period (Stages IV and V), representing the peak era of commerce at the site.

== Coastal route ==
It is suggested that a coastal route existed linking Lothal and Dholavira to Sutkagan Dor on the Makran coast.

== Language and script ==
The Harappans spoke an unknown language and their script has not yet been deciphered. It is believed to have had around 400 basic signs, with many variations. The signs may have stood both for words and for syllables. The direction of the writing was generally from right-to-left. Most of the inscriptions are found on seals (mostly made out of stone) and sealings (pieces of clay on which the seal was pressed down to leave its impression). Some inscriptions are also found on copper tablets, bronze implements, and small objects made of terracotta, stone and faience. The seals may have been used in trade and also for official administrative work. A lot of inscribed material was found at Mohenjo-daro and other Indus Valley Civilisation sites.

=== Sign board ===
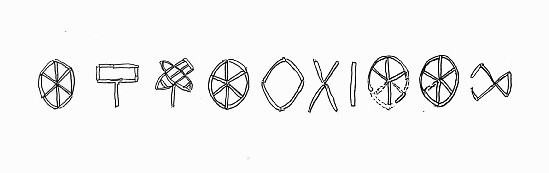
Ten Indus characters from the northern gate of Dholavira, dubbed the Dholavira Signboard

The most significant discoveries at Dholavira were made in one of the side rooms of the northern gateway of the city, and is generally known as the Dholavira Signboard. The Harappans had arranged and set pieces of the mineral gypsum to form ten large symbols or letters on a big wooden board. At some point, the board fell flat on its face. The wood decayed, but the arrangement of the letters survived. The letters of the signboard are comparable to large bricks that were used in nearby walls. Each sign is about 37 cm (15 in) high and the board on which letters were inscribed was about 3 m (9.8 ft) long.

The inscription is one of the longest in the Indus script, with one of the symbols appearing four times, and this and its large size and public nature make it a key piece of evidence cited by scholars arguing that the Indus script represents full literacy. A four sign inscription with large letters on sandstone is also found at this site, considered first of such inscription on sandstone at any of Harappan sites.
