= Raymond Allchin =

British archaeologist

Dr Frank Raymond Allchin
- Born: 9 July 1923; Harrow, London, United Kingdom
- Died: 4 June 2010 (aged 86); Cambridge, United Kingdom
- Education: SOAS University of London
- Known for: Significant contribution to the study of the ancient history of Afghanistan, Pakistan, India, Sri Lanka
- Spouse: Bridget Allchin
- Parents: Frank Macdonald Allchin (father); Louise Maude (mother)
- Scientific career
- Fields: archeology

Frank Raymond Allchin, FBA (9 July 1923 – 4 June 2010) was a British archaeologist and Indologist. He and his wife, Bridget Allchin, formed one of the most influential British partnerships in the post-Independence study of South Asian archaeology. Producing a large body of scholarship ranging from archaeological excavations, ethnoarchaeology as well as epigraphy and linguistics, the Allchins made their work and that of others accessible through a series of sole, joint and edited publications. Seminal works include The Birth of Indian Civilisation (1968), which was later superseded by their books The Rise of Indian Civilisation in India and Pakistan (1982) and The Archaeology of Early Historic South Asia (1995).

== Background ==
Raymond Allchin was born in Harrow, London on 9 July 1923, son of Frank Macdonald Allchin, a doctor, and Louise Maude. His brother was Donald Allchin, an Anglican priest and theologian. Raymond was educated at Westminster School and enrolled at the Regent Street Polytechnic, where he studied architecture for three years followed by conscription into the Royal Corps of Signals. Trained as a Line Mechanic, Raymond was posted to India in 1944. On his return, he embarked on a BA in Hindi and Sanskrit at SOAS University of London, followed by a PhD on the prehistory of Raichur District in Hyderabad under the supervision of Professor K. de B. Codrington at the same institution. On completing his PhD, Raymond was appointed Lecturer in Indian archaeology at SOAS in 1954. He left SOAS in 1959 for the post of Lectureship in Indian Studies at Cambridge.

Raymond died in Cambridge on 4 June 2010. He and his wife Bridget had two children, Sushila and William.

== Career ==
=== Afghanistan and South India ===
Raymond was an active field archaeologist throughout his career and his first introduction to South Asian fieldwork was in the Bamiyan Valley of Afghanistan in 1951. Here, under the direction of Codrington, he studied the standing remains of Shahr-e-Zohak. Later that year, in the company of Bridget, he began his PhD research in Raichur District. Raymond's selected research topic, the Neolithic of Peninsular India, was one of the areas of South Asian archaeology most poorly understood and was a neglected area of research when compared to the Bronze Age Indus cities or those of the Early Historic period in the north of the Subcontinent. After undertaking a survey of sites within the District, he selected the ash-mound of Piklihal for further investigation. Excavating in 1952, and again in 1957, with the assistance of the Andhra Pradesh Department of Archeology and Museums, Raymond demonstrated that the ash mound had a distinct Neolithic sequence with later evidence of Iron Age occupation above.

In order to test some of his earlier theories about Piklihal, Raymond selected Utnur for excavation, one of the best-preserved ash mounds. In a single season, he cut through metres of cinder and ash and discovered that the mounds were contained by series of post-holes, demarking superimposed circular stockades. He again dated this site-type to the Neolithic of South India and to the fourth millennium BC on account of the associated polished stone axes. He interpreted the stockades at Utnur as annual cattle camps, whose accumulations of dung were burnt at the end of each grazing season, thus creating a regular sequence of ash and cinder. He later developed these ideas into a narrative which bound together Hindu ritual tradition and contemporary pastoral practice with the archaeological findings, suggesting that the regular burning of the stockades was not a calamity or the result of raiding but part of an annual fire rite, perhaps surviving today as Holi, Divali or Pongal.

=== Pakistan and Western India ===
On moving to Cambridge in 1959, Raymond turned his attention to Pakistan and worked at the site of Shaikhan Dheri between 1963 and 1964. Working with Professor A. H. Dani of Peshawar University, Raymond and Bridget supervised the processing of antiquities and pottery drawing during the first season. Although only on site for one season, Raymond later produced research on artefacts from Shaikhan Dheri. He suggested that a number of small iron plates pierced with small holes around their edges, some of which had rusted together, formed part of the scale armour from the cap of a cataphract, based on observations from Gandharan sculpture, excavation reports, textual sources and contemporary examples from Rajput. He also suggested that a number of globular vessels, that Sir John Marshall had interpreted for distillation of water at Sirkap, Taxila, were actually alcohol stills. Basing this hypothesis on ethnographic analogy, Vedic references and Rajput texts he stated that "Considering the importance of alcohol for man-kind . . . it is surprising that comparatively little is known of its early history,'12 and concluding that 'it may well be that the art of distillation was India’s gift to the world!"

Raymond then shifted his focus back to India and undertook an archaeological reconnaissance of the coast of Gujarat in 1967 focused on investigating the presence or absence of sites associated with the Indus civilisation in western India, following this in 1968 with excavations at the site of Malvan with Bridget and Dr J. P. Joshi, of the Archaeological Survey of India (ASI). Returning to fieldwork in the North West Frontier Province in the Bannu Basin, Raymond and Bridget worked collaboratively between 1977 and 1979, working at Lewan and Tarakai Qila with Professor F. A. Durrani and Professor Farid Khan of Peshawar University, Mr Robert Knox of the British Museum and Professor Ken Thomas of UCL. Later as Joint Director of the British Archaeological Mission to Pakistan with Bridget, the focus shifted away from the Bronze Age to the Early historic period and particularly onto the site of Taxila.

On a walk around the Hathial ridge one February morning in 1980, not far from the Taxila Museum guesthouse, they discovered numerous sherds of a distinctive, highly burnished red ware covering an area of 13 hectares along the foot of the spur. Raymond recognised that these sherds belonged to the category of Burnished Red Ware associated with the Gandhara grave culture, dating to the beginning of the first millennium BC at the end of the Chalcolithic period. Also aware of the parallel presence of such sherds in the basal levels of Wheeler's excavations at the Bala Hisar of Charsadda challenged received wisdom at the time that suggested that such cities had been founded no earlier than the sixth century BC as the Persian Empire expanded eastwards and annexed the satrapy of Gandhara, and that the urban sequences of the region stretched back before Persian contact, possibly back to the late Chalcolithic. Though Raymond never excavated to prove such assertions, he was pivotal to negotiating the return of an archaeological team to Charsadda after a gap of thirty years. Jointly directed by his former students, Professor Robin Coningham and Professor Ihsan Ali of Peshawar University, excavations between 1993 and 1997 confirmed Raymond's hypothesis of a much earlier date for initial settlement at c.1300 BC.

=== Sri Lanka ===
In 1989 and at the age of 67, Raymond initiated his last major field project in Sri Lanka at the Citadel of Anuradhapura in the island's North Central Province following a joint invitation from Dr Roland Silva, director general of archaeology, and Dr Siran Deraniyagala, one of his former students and then archaeological advisor to the Government of Sri Lanka. Raymond invited his former undergraduate and new research student, Robin Coningham, to accept the role of field director, and the results from excavations between 1989 and 1993, refuted many long held assumptions. Excavating a ten-metre deep cultural sequence stretching from the ninth century BC to the tenth century AD. it provided evidence of urbanism in the fourth century BC but also confirmed Deraniyagala's early claim of evidence of the earliest Early Brahmi script anywhere in South Asia, demonstrating its use to facilitate trade before being later adopted as an imperial tool by the Mauryans.

== Legacy ==
The Allchins were also pivotal in promoting and facilitating the study of South Asian archaeology in Europe as well as within the Subcontinent. In the 1970s, aware of the fragmented nature of South Asian scholarship across Europe and seeking to broaden the capacity that was at the time possible and available within Britain, the Allchins, together with colleagues from Europe, created a biannual platform for South Asian archaeologists, numismatists, epigraphers and historians of art and architecture to exchange information from current research. Forming the European Association of South Asian Archaeologists, the Allchins organised the first meeting, which was held at Churchill College in Cambridge in 1971.

In reaction to the lack of institutions, teaching posts or funds devoted to the promotion of popular or scholarly interest in South and Central Asia, the Allchins, along with Professor Sir Harold Bailey, Professor Johanna van Lohuizen-de Leeuw and Dr Jan van Lohuizen, founded the Ancient India and Iran Trust in Cambridge in 1978. The Trust aimed to support and provide a focal point where scholars and members of the public with interests in the cultures of these geographic regions could meet and use its unique library, substantially composed of the collections of its founders. The Trust also organised funds to facilitate Indian and Pakistani visiting fellowships, which included highly distinguished scholars including Dilip Chakrabari, Ravi Korisettar, K. Krishnan, V. N. Misra, Lolita Nehru, K. Paddaya, Gautam Sengupta and Vasant Shinde.

The legacy of the Allchins, and the Trust that they helped found, continues to support the promotion of South Asian scholarship. In December 2013, the first Annual Allchin Symposium, named in their honour, was held at the Trust. Established to commemorate their work and outstanding contribution to the development of South Asian studies in the UK, the Symposium brings together established lecturers, post-doctoral researchers and PhD students working in South Asian Archaeology, History and the History of Art and Architecture, providing a forum for the presentation and discussion of current research. Amongst other collections, the Ancient India and Iran Trust also houses the Allchin archive, comprising the photographic slide collection of both Allchins and the meticulous work diaries which Raymond kept during each of his field seasons, offering great potential to scholars of South Asian archaeology.

=== Heritage protection ===
As well as undertaking almost forty years of field investigations, Raymond was also motivated by the need to record and protect heritage in the face of the pressures of increasing population and development in South Asia. Raymond was also one of the pioneers for the protection of heritage sites within their cultural landscape, as illustrated by his work for the UN with the Japanese Planner and Architect, K. Matsushita, in 1969. Raymond and Matsushita had been contracted by UNDP with the responsibility to guide the development of Lumbini, the birthplace of the Buddha, following the 1967 visit to the site by U Thant, the UN Secretary General, who wished to see the site transformed from what Raymond called 'little more than a neglected field' to a site worthy of 'a collection of monuments of great importance'. Tasked with assisting in the planning of a sacred garden, pilgrim village and a buffer zone around the site, this report was later used by the Japanese architect, Kenzō Tange, as the core for his masterplan for Lumbini, which has directed the development of the site over the last thirty years into the present.

== Academic recognition ==
Recognition of Raymond's contribution to South Asian archaeology was rewarded in Cambridge when he was appointed a Fellow of Churchill College in 1963 and promoted to a Readership in Indian Studies in 1972. Away from Cambridge, his achievements were also recognised through being made a Fellow of the Royal Asiatic Society in 1953, a Fellow of the Society of Antiquaries in 1957, a Fellow of the Royal Society of Arts in 1974 and a Fellow of the British Academy in 1981 as well as having an Honorary D.Litt. conferred by Deccan College, Pune in 2007. He also served on the Governing Council of the Society for Afghan Studies and its successor, the Society for South Asian Studies, as well as being associated with the Charles Wallace Pakistan Trust, the British Academy's Stein-Arnold Committee and the Advisory Council of the Victoria and Albert Museum. Raymond was appointed a Fellow of the British Academy in 1981 and retired with the title of Emeritus Reader in South Asian archaeology in 1989.

== Personal life ==
In 1951, Bridget met fellow PhD student Raymond Allchin at the Institute of Archaeology and they married in March of that year. Travelling to India for the first time with Raymond in 1951, Bridget steadily but firmly established herself as the most prominent South Asian Prehistorian in the UK. A pioneering female field-archaeologist in South Asia at a time when there were none, Bridget's research interests and publications were to stretch across South Asia from Afghanistan to Sri Lanka.

Like Raymond, Bridget's family also had a long heritage of medical practitioners, including Dr Thomas Monro, an ancestor who had attempted to treat the 'madness' of George III.

== Publications ==
=== Publications: 1950s—1960s ===
Extended content
- 1954 Development of Early Cultures in the Raichur District of Hyderabad. PhD Dissertation, University of London, School of Oriental and African Studies.
- 1964 Tulsi Das, Kavitavali, translated with introduction (UNESCO), London, Allen & Unwin, pp 229.
- 1953 'A flake tool from the Oxus', Proceedings of the Prehistoric Society, 19, 227.
- 1955 'Rock paintings and engravings in Raichur, Hyderabad', (with D.H. Gordon), Man, 55, 114, 97–99.
- 1956 'Stone alignments of Southern Hyderabad', Man, 56, 133–136.
- 1957 'The Neolithic stone industry of North Karnataka region', Bulletin of the School of Oriental and African Studies, 19, 321–335.
- 1957 'The culture sequence of Bactria', Antiquity, 31, 131–141.
- 1957 'Sanskrit eduka – Pali eduka', Bulletin of the School of Oriental and African Studies, 20, 1–4.
- 1959 'Poor men's thalis, a Deccan potter's technique', Bulletin of the School of Oriental and African Studies, 22, 250–257.
- 1959 'Upon the contextual significance of certain groups of ancient Indian signs', Bulletin of the School of Oriental and African Studies, 22, 548–555.
- 1960 Piklihal Excavations, Andhra Pradesh Archaeological Series, 1, Hyderabad, Government of Andhra Pradesh, pp xvii, 154.
- 1961 Utnur Excavations, Andhra Pradesh Archaeological Series 5, Hyderabad, Government of Andhra Pradesh, pp 75.
- 1961 'Ideas of history in Indian archaeological writing', in C. Philips, ed., Historians of India, Pakistan and Ceylon, Oxford, Oxford University Press, 241–259.
- 1961 'The antiquity and methods of gold mining in ancient India', Journal of the Economic and Social History of the Orient, 5, 195–211.
- 1962 'The Neolithic stone industry of the Santal Parganas', Bulletin of the School of Oriental and African Studies, 25, 306–330.
- 1962 'A Neolithic pot from the Billa Surgam caves, Andhra Pradesh, Antiquity, 36, 302–303.
- 1962 'Painted pottery from Patapad in Andhra Pradesh, Antiquity, 36, 221–224.
- 1963 Neolithic Cattle Keepers of South India: A study of Deccan ashmounds, Cambridge, Cambridge University Press, pp xvi, 189.
- 1963 'Cattle and economy in the Neolithic of South India', in A.E. Mourant and F.E. Zeuner, eds, Man and Cattle, London 149–155. 1963 'The cultural tradition of India', The Listener, March, 25–39.
- 1964 'An inscribed weight from Mathura', Journal of the Economic and Social History of the Orient, 7, 201–205.
- 1966 'Pottery and head-rests from Narasipur Sangam', in D. Sen and A.K. Ghosh, eds, Studies in Prehistory, Robert Bruce Foote Memorial Volume, Calcutta, Firma K. L. Mukhopadhyay, 58–63.
- 1966 'The place of Tulsi Das in North Indian devotional tradition', Journal of the Royal Asiatic Society, 123–140.
- 1966 Tulsi Das, The petition to Ram, translation of Vinayapatrika with introduction, notes and glossary, London, Allen & Unwin, pp 365.
- 1968 'The social thought of Swami Vivekananda', Swami Vivekannanda in East and West, London, Ramakrishna Vedanta Centre, 84–105.
- 1968 'Archaeology and the date of Kaniska', in A.L. Basham, ed., Papers on the Date of Kaniska, Leiden, E. J. Brill, 4–34.
- 1968 'Explorations in districts Baroda, Broach and Surat' (with J.P. Joshi), Indian Archaeology 1967–68 – a review, New Delhi, Archaeological Survey of India, 9–13.
- 1969 'Early domestic animals in India and Pakistan', in P.J. Ucko and G.W. Dimbleby, eds, The Domestication and Exploitation of Plants and Animals, London, Duckworth, 317–22.
- 1969 'Early cultivated plants in India and Pakistan', in P.J. Ucko and G.W. Dimbleby, eds, The Domestication and Exploitation of Plants and Animals, London, Duckworth, 323–29.
- 1969 'Dilmun and the gulf of Cambay', Antiquity, 43, 315–16.

=== Publications: 1970s—1980s ===
Extended content
- 1970 'Malvan – further light on the southern extension of the Indus Civilisation' (with J.P. Joshi), Journal of the Royal Asiatic Society¸ 1, 20–28.
- 1970 'A pottery group from Ayun, Chitral' (in honour of Sir Harold Bailey), Bulletin of the School of Oriental and African Studies, 33, 1–4.
- 1971 'The attaining of the void – a review of some recent contributions in English to Virasaiva studies', Religious Studies, 7, 339–59.
- 1972 'Malvan' (with J.P. Joshi), in S.B. Deo, ed., Archaeological Congress and Seminar Papers, Nagpur, Nagpur University, 36–42.
- 1972 'A piece of scale armour from Shaikhan Dheri, Charsada', Journal of the Royal Asiatic Society, 2, 113–20.
- 1972 'A cruciform reliquary from Shaikhan Dheri, Charsada', in P. Pal, ed., Aspects of Indian Art, Leiden, E. J. Brill, 15–26.
- 1973 'An inscribed reliquary from Shaikhan Dheri, in H.H. Hartel and V. Moeller, eds, Indologen-Tagung, 1971, Wiesbaden, Steiner, 265–72.
- 1973 'Problems and perspectives in South Asian archaeology', in N. Hammond, ed., South Asian Archaeology, 1971, Park Ridge, Noyes Press, 1–11.
- 1974 'The emergence of civilisation in North India', Encyclopædia Britannica. London, Encyclopædia Britannica
- 1974 'Pottery from graves in the Perumal hills near Kodaikanal', in A.K. Ghosh, ed., Perspectives in Palaeoanthropology (Dharani Sen volume), Calcutta, Firma K. L. Mukhopadhyay, 299–308.
- 1975 'The reconciliation of jnana and bhakti in Ramcaritamanasa', Religious Studies, 12, 81–91.
- 1976 'The mysterious Path of Love in Tulsi Das', Vedanta for East and West, London, Ramakrishna Vedanta Centre, 152, 3–11.
- 1976 Preface for reprint of Annual Reports of the Archaeological Survey of Mysore, 1–3.
- 1977 'Recommendations concerning archaeological sites', in E.F. Sekler, ed., Masterplan for the Conservation of the Cultural Heritage in the Kathmandu Valley, UNESCO, Paris, 147–54.
- 1977 'Recommendations concerning moveable cultural property', in E.F. Sekler, ed., Masterplan for the Conservation of the Cultural Heritage in the Kathmandu Valley, UNESCO, Paris, 134–47.
- 1977 'Religious symbols and Indian thought', in H.R.E. Davidson, ed., Symbols of Power, Cambridge, The Folklore Society Mistletoe Series, 1–35.
- 1977 'A modern Indian potter's technique', in D. Chattopadhyaya, ed., History and Society: Essays in honour of Professor Niharanjan Ray, Calcutta, Firma K. L. Mukhopadhyay, 1–13.
- 1978 'Surface collections from Pushkar', in B. Allchin, A.S. Goudie and K. Hegde, eds, The Prehistory and Palaeogeography of the Great Indian Desert, New York, Academic Press, 331-1+9.
- 1978 'Monument conservation and policy in India', Journal of the Royal Society of Arts, 126, 746–65.
- 1978 'Introduction' (with N. Hammond), in F.R. Allchin and N. Hammond, eds, The Archaeology of Afghanistan, New York, Academic Press, 1–9.
- 1978 'Conclusion' (with N. Hammond), in F.R. Allchin and N. Hammond, eds, The Archaeology of Afghanistan, New York, Academic Press, 405–14.
- 1978 The Archaeology of Afghanistan (with N. Hammond, ed. and contributor), London, Academic Press, pp xxiii, 451.
- 1979 A Source-book of Indian Archaeology (with D.K. Chakrabarti), New Delhi, Munshiram Manoharlal, Vol. 1, pp x, 354.
- 1979 'India – the ancient home of distillation?’, Man, 14, 55–63.
- 1979 'Stamped Tangas and condensers: evidence of distillation at Shaikhan Dheri', in M. Taddei, ed., South Asian Archaeology, 1977, Naples, Istituto Universitario Orientale, 755-97.
- 1980 'A note on the "Asokan" stupas of Patan', in A.L. Dallapiccola, ed., The Stupa, its Religious, Historical and Architectural Significance, Wiesbaden, Frantz Steiner Verlag, 147–56.
- 1980 'Textile impressions from the South Indian Iron Age', P.E.P. Deraniyagala Commemoration Volume, Sri Lanka, 64–7.
- 1980 'Archaeological and language evidence for the movement of Indo-Aryan speaking peoples into South Asia', J. K.R. Cama Oriental Institute, Bombay, 48, 68–102; also published in 1981, in M.S. Asimov, B.A. Litvinsky, L.I. Miroshnikov and D.S. Rayevsky, eds, Ethnic Problems of the history of Central Asia in the Early Period (2nd millennium B.C.), Moscow 336–49.
- 1981 'Preliminary report on the Bannu Basin Project (1977–79) – Introduction', in H. Härtel (ed.), South Asian Archaeology, 1979, Berlin: Dietrich Reimer Verlag, 217–218.
- 1981 'Preliminary report on the excavations at Lewan (1977–78)’ (with J.R. Knox), in H. Hartel, ed., South Asian Archaeology, 1979, Berlin, Dietrich Reimer Verlag, 241-44.
- 1981 'Preliminary report on the excavations at Tarakai Qila (1978–79)’ (with J.R. Knox), in H. Hartel, ed., South Asian Archaeology, 1979, Berlin, Dietrich Reimer Verlag, 245–50.
- 1981 'Antiquity of gold mining in the Gadag region', in M.S. Nagaraja Rao, ed., Madhu, Recent Researches in Indian Archaeology and History, Delhi, Agam Kala Prakashan, 81–3.
- 1981 'The legacy of the Indus Civilisation', in Gregory L. Possehl, ed., Harappan Civilization, A Contemporary Perspective¸ New Delhi, Oxford & IBH, 325–33.
- 1981 'Antiquity and continuity', in P. Jayakar et al., eds, The Indian Experience, 125–29.
- 1981 'Antecedents of the Indus Civilization (10th Annual Mortimer Wheeler Archaeological Lecture)’, Bulletin of the British Academy, 66, 135–60.
- 1981 'How old is the city of Taxila?’, Antiquity, 56, 8–14.
- 1982 Indian Monuments through British Eyes, 1780–1980: Handlist of the exhibition in the Fitzwilliam Museum, Cambridge, Fitzwilliam Museum, pp 1–18.
- 1984 'The northern limits of the Harappan culture zone in the light of recent observations', in B.B. Lal and S.P. Gupta, eds, Frontiers of the Indus Civilization, New Delhi, Books and Books, 51–4.
- 1985 'Guide to the Asokan inscriptions' (with K.R. Norman), in B. Allchin, ed., South Asian Studies, 1, 43–50.
- 1985 'The interpretation of a seal from Chanhu-daro and its significance for the religion of the Indus Civilization, South Asian Archaeology 1983, in J. Schotsmans, J. and M. Taddei, M., eds. Naples, Instituto Universitario Orientale, Dipartimento di Studi Asiatici, Series Minor 23: 369–84.
- 1986 'Radiocarbon dating of some early sites in North West Pakistan' (with K.D. Thomas), South Asian Studies, 2: 37–44.
- 1986 'Drumbeats from the past', Pupul Jayakar Felicitation Volume, Dimensions of Indian Art –Pupul Jayakar Seventy, in L. Candra and J. Jain, eds., Delhi, Agam Kala Prakashan,
- 1989 The Conservation of the Indian Heritage (with B. Allchin and B. K. Thapar, ed. and contributor), New Delhi, Cosmo Publications, pp 275.
- 1989 'The aims of the Seminar', introductory remarks, in B. Allchin, F.R. Allchin and B.K. Thapar, eds, The Conservation of the Indian heritage, New Delhi, Cosmo Publications.
- 1989 'Threats to the conservation of monuments in urban and rural settings', in B. Allchin, F.R. Allchin and B.K. Thapar eds, The Conservation of the Indian heritage, New Delhi.
- 1989 'City and State Formation in Early Historic South Asia', South Asian Studies 5: 1–16.

=== Publications: 1990s—2000s ===
Extended content
- 1990 'Indo-Aryan and Aryan: language, culture and ethnicity'. Ancient Ceylon 10:13–23.
- 1990 'Patterns of city formation in Early Historic South Asia'. South Asian Studies 6: 163–74.
- 1990 'The end of the Harappan Urban Phase and its aftermath'. Ancient Ceylon 10: 25–40.
- 1991 Shahr-i Zohak and the History of the Bamiyan Valley, Afghanistan, with P.H.B. Baker, ed. Oxford: British Archaeological Reports Number 570, Ancient India and Iran Trust Series No. 1: pp. 215
- 1991 Coningham R.A.E. & Allchin F.R. 'Anuradhapura Citadel Archaeological Project: Preliminary Report of the Second Season of Sri Lankan – British Excavations at Salgha Watta'. South Asian Studies 7: 167–175.
- 1992 'An Indus ram: a hitherto unrecorded stone sculpture from the Indus Civilization'. South Asian Studies 8: 53–4.
- 1992 Coningham R.A.E. & Allchin F.R. 'Anuradhapura Citadel Archaeological Project: Preliminary Results of the Third Season of Sri Lankan – British Excavations at Salgaha Watta'. South Asian Studies 8: 155–167.
- 1993 'The urban position of Taxila and its place in Northwest India-Pakistan', in H. Spodek. and D. M. Srinivasan, eds. Urban Form and Meaning in South Asia. Washington DC: National Gallery of Art. Studies in the History of Art, 31. Center for Advanced Study in the Visual Arts Symposium Papers 15: 69–81.
- 1995 The archaeology of Early Historic South Asia: The emergence of cities and states, (ed.), Cambridge, Cambridge University Press, xvii-317.
- 1995 Excavations at Malvan; report of the collaboration of the Archaeological Survey of India and Cambridge University in 1970, on the Gujarat Plain (with J. P. Joshi) New Delhi, Memoirs of the Archaeological Survey of India 92, pp vii, 117.
- 1996 Coningham R.A.E., Allchin F.R., Batt C.M. & Lucy D. Passage to India? Anuradhapura and the Early Use of the Brahmi Script. Cambridge Archaeological Journal 6(1): 73–97.
- 1997 A Source-book of Indian Archaeology (with D.K. Chakrabarti), New Delhi, Munshiram Manoharlal, Vol. 2: Settlements, Technology and Trade, pp 708.
- 1997 South Asian archaeology, 1971–1991 : index of the proceedings of the biennial conferences of the European Association of South Asian Archaeologists (formerly, Association of South Asian Archaeologists in Western Europe), (compiler). Naples: Indices, Istituto Universitario Orientale. Dipartimento di Studi Aisatici; 3, pp 109.
- 1998 'The interface of archaeology and history'. Man and Environment 23, (1): 19–36.
- 1999 Ancient Buddhist Scrolls from Gandhara: The British Library Kharosthi Fragments (with Richard Salomon and Mark Barnard), London, British Library.
- 1999 'Preface', in R.A.E. Coningham, ed. Anuradhapura: The British–Sri Lankan Excavations at Anuradhapura Salagha Watta 2. Volume 1: The Site. Oxford: Archaeopress for the Society for South Asian Studies (The British Academy): (BAR international series 824; Society for South Asian Studies monograph no. 3): ix–xi.
- 2000 The Ancient India and Iran Trust Library. Second, revised edition. Cambridge : Ancient India & Iran Trust Library.
- 2003 A Source-book of Indian Archaeology (with D.K. Chakrabarti), New Delhi, Munshiram Manoharlal, vol. 3: Prehistoric Roots of Religious Beliefs, Human Remains, The First Steps in Historical Archaeology: Sculpture, Architecture, Coins and Inscriptions. pp 291.
- 2006 'Inscriptions and graffiti' in R.A.E. Coningham, ed. Anuradhapura: The British – Sri Lankan Excavations at Anuradhapura Salgaha Watta: Volume 2 The Artefacts. Oxford: Archaeopress for the Society for South Asian Studies (The British Academy): 431–450.

=== Joint publications ===
Extended content

Allchin, Bridget, and F. Raymond Allchin 1968. The Birth of Indian Civilization: India and Pakistan Before 500 B.C. Harmondsworth: Penguin Books.

Allchin, Bridget, and F. Raymond Allchin 1982. The Rise of Civilization in India and Pakistan. Cambridge: Cambridge University Press.

Allchin, Bridget, and F. Raymond Allchin 1997. Origins of a Civilization: The Prehistory and Early Archaeology of South Asia. New Delhi: Viking.

Allchin, F. Raymond, and Bridget Allchin 2012. From the Oxus to Mysore in 1951: The start of a great partnership in Indian Archaeology. Kilkerran: Hardinge Simpole

=== Reports for UNESCO and UNDP ===
Extended content

1969 Cultural Tourism in India: its scope and development with special reference to the monumental heritage, UNESCO, pp104.

1969 Report on the Lumbini Development Project (with K. Matsushita), UNDP.

== See also ==
- Ahmad Hasan Dani
- Ihsan Ali
- Elena Efimovna Kuzmina
- Yunas Samad
- Siran Upendra Deraniyagala
