= Debala Mitra =

Indian archeologist (1925–2003)

- Born: 14 December 1925; Khulna, Bengal Province, British India (now in Bangladesh)
- Died: 2 December 2003 (aged 77); Kolkata, India
- Education: University of Paris
- Known for: First woman Director General of the Archaeological Survey of India (ASI)
- Notable work: Konarak (1968); Buddhist Monuments (1971); Bronzes from Achutrajpur, Orissa (1978)
- Scientific career
- Fields: Archaeology

Debala Mitra (14 December 1925 – 2 December 2003) was an Indian archaeologist who served as Director General of the Archaeological Survey of India (ASI) from 1981 to 1983. She is the first woman archaeologist to head the ASI. She explored and excavated several Buddhist sites.

The historic site of Ratnagiri in Odisha's Jajpur district, first discovered in 1905, gained prominence following extensive excavations between 1958 and 1961 led by Mitra, which unveiled a remarkable Buddhist complex dating from the 5th-13th century AD.

== Early life ==
Born on 14 December 1925 at Khulna in Bengal Province (now Bangladesh), Mitra had her early education in Khulna and Calcutta (now Kolkata) before obtaining her doctorate in Paris.

== In the ASI ==
Mitra joined the ASI in the 1940s and served as Superintendent of Eastern Circle and Additional Director General of the ASI before succeeding B. K. Thapar as Director General in 1981. The first woman to excavate Buddhist sites, she was an authority on the art and archaeology of eastern India. Her books include Konarak (1968), Buddhist Monuments (1971) and Bronzes from Achutrajpur, Orissa (1978).

Preceded by B. K. Thapar	Director General of the Archaeological Survey of India; 1981 - 1983	Succeeded by M. S. Nagaraja Rao
