= Ancient India and Iran Trust =

The Ancient India and Iran Trust was founded in 1978, and occupies a unique position in the UK. It is the only independent charity concerned with the study of early India, Iran & Central Asia, promoting both scholarly research & popular interest in the area. It has a library of over 25,000 volumes and it organises a range of activities including conferences, public lectures and visiting fellowships. The primary interest of the Trust has been in prehistory, archaeology, art history and ancient languages, but this often extends to more modern topics and other disciplines.

The idea of the Ancient India & Iran Trust came to the Founding Trustees (Dr Raymond Allchin, Dr Bridget Allchin, Sir Harold Bailey, Dr Jan van Lohuizen, and Professor Hanne van Lohuizen-de Leeuw) when they became aware that the Indian sub-continent, together with Iran, Afghanistan & parts of Central Asia, was the 'neglected quarter' of the world in terms of British cultural life. Britain had had a close association with India in particular for over three centuries and had unrivalled resources for the study of its culture, art and history, in the India Office Library, the British Museum, the Victoria & Albert Museum and much more. And yet, in the wake of South Asian independence, there were very few institutions, teaching posts or funds devoted to the promotion of popular or scholarly interest in any of these regions. The Trust was therefore set up to provide a focal point where scholars and members of the public with interests in the cultures of the ancient Indian and Iranian worlds could meet and discuss matters of common interest and use its unique library.

Today, the Trust runs a regular series of public lectures, visiting fellowship programmes and a bursary scheme for people wishing to come and use its library and other resources in Cambridge. It also organises and hosts conferences, high-profile lectures and occasional exhibitions, and has produced some publications. In addition, it created and funded the British Archaeological Mission to Pakistan in the 1980s and has provided a base for external research projects such as the AHRC funded Manichean Dictionary Project (1999–2005) and Bactrian Chronology Project (2004-7). In 2005 the Trust was voted runner up in the Arts, Culture and Heritage category of the Charity Awards.

The Trust is based in a large Victorian house at 23 Brooklands Avenue, Cambridge. The house was purchased by the five Founding Trustees in 1981 and became the repositories of their specialised libraries. It was also the home until his death at the age of 96 of the first Chair, the distinguished scholar and linguist, Sir Harold Bailey.

The Trust has appointed a number of Honorary Fellows:

- Professor Mary Boyce
- Professor Werner Sundermann
- Professor Gherardo Gnoli
- Ralph Pinder-Wilson
- Professor Robert Hillenbrand
- Professor Minoru Hara
- Professor Anna Dallapiccola
