= Siran Upendra Deraniyagala =

Sri Lankan archaeologist (1942–2021)

- Born: 1 March 1942; Chilaw, Ratnapura, British Ceylon
- Died: 5 October 2021 (aged 79); Sri Lanka
- Education: S. Thomas' College, Mount Lavinia, Trinity College, Cambridge, University of London, Harvard University
- Occupation: Archaeologist
- Known for: Sri Lankan Archaeology, Prehistory of Sri Lanka

Siran Upendra Deraniyagala (1 March 1942 – 5 October 2021) was a Sri Lankan archaeologist and historian, who served as the Director-General of Archaeology in the Department of Archaeology of Sri Lanka from 1992 to 2001. He also served as the President of the Sri Lanka Council of Archaeologists.

== Early life ==
Siran Upendra Deraniyagala was born on 1 March 1942 in Ratnapura, the third of four sons of Paulus Edward Pieris Deraniyagala (Director of the National Museum of Ceylon, 1939–1963) and Prini Molamure. His grandfather was Sir Deraniyagala Paulus Edward Pieris Samarasinghe Sriwardhana. Siran completed his school education at St. Thomas' College, Mount Lavinia.

== Career ==
He obtained a BA and MA in Architecture and Sanskrit at Trinity College, Cambridge before completing a postgraduate diploma at the Institute of Archaeology, University of London. At the institute, he qualified with distinction and was awarded the Gordon Childe Prize, as one of two best all-round students in all fields of archaeology. In 1968, he joined the Archaeological Survey Department of Sri Lanka as the Assistant Commissioner in charge of scientific excavations. He introduced research design, plans for infrastructure and human resource development in excavation division.

In 1969, he oversaw the first excavation at the citadel of Anuradhapura down to its earliest levels and his excavation efforts were also regarded as the first scientific stratified excavation process to have been undertaken in Sri Lanka. It also soon set a platform to emerging archaeologists in Sri Lanka. He outlined a revised age estimate for radio-carbon chronology of ancient Anuradhapura in a research paper which was presented at the 14th International Conference of the European Association of South Asian Archaeologists in 1997.

Siran then focused on prehistoric explorations and excavations in ancient shore dunes (referred to as the Iranamadu Formation) dating back to more than 130,000 years ago. He used the resulting data to complete a PhD at Harvard University in 1988. He also carried out fieldwork overseas in countries such as Netherlands, India, France and England. In 1992, he was appointed the Director-General at the Department of Archaeology, a position he held until 2001.

He had also published over 40 research articles, which have gone onto feature in some of the leading journals in the world. He had also held several high-profile key positions in the Ministry of Cultural Affairs and Department of Archaeology. Furthermore, he also directed more than 20 national and international projects in Sri Lanka.

== Death ==
He died on 5 October 2021, at the age of 79.

== Bibliography ==
- Deraniyagala, Siran Upendra (1971). Stone Implements from a Balangoda Culture Site in Ceylon – Bellan Bandi Palassa. Commissioner of Archaeology.
- Deraniyagala, Siran Upendra (1988). The Prehistory of Sri Lanka: An Ecological Perspective. Harvard University.
- Deraniyagala, Siran Upendra (1992). The Prehistory of Sri Lanka. Vol. 2. Department of Archaeological Survey.
- Deraniyagala, Siran Upendra (1997). Radiocarbon Chronology of Iron Age and Early Historic Anuradhapura, Sri Lanka: Revised Age Estimate. Ancient Ceylon.

== See also ==
- Raymond Allchin
- Ahmad Hasan Dani
- Ihsan Ali
