= Karnataka State Department of Archaeology =

Research department in India

State Archaeology Department of Karnataka
- Abbreviation: KSA
- Formation: 1885
- Founder: Kingdom of Mysuru
- Type: Governmental organization
- Region served: Karnataka
- Official language: Kannada
- Parent organisation: Ministry of Culture (Karnataka)
- Affiliations: Archaeological Survey of India
- Website: www.archaeology.karnataka.gov.in

Karnataka State Department of Archaeology is a department of the Government of Karnataka which oversees archaeological exploration and maintenance of heritage sites in the state of Karnataka, India. Established in 1885, as the Archaeological Department of the princely state of Mysore, B. Lewis Rice was its first Director General. In the last years of the 19th century, the department published the inscriptions of Mysore as a multiple volume Epigraphia Carnatica.

The department protects 844 monuments in the state. In July 2024, the department found a Kannada inscription dating back to Vijayanagara period in Huvina Hadagali.

The most prominent archaeologist associated with the Karnataka State Department of Archaeology was M. S. Nagaraja Rao who later went on to head the Archaeological Survey of India (ASI).

The department has started to begin the process of 3D digital preservation of more than 400 monuments in North Karnataka under the Belgaum division in July 2022.

== See also ==
- Tamil Nadu Archaeology Department
- Kerala State Archaeology Department
