= M. C. Joshi =

Indian nuclear physicist

M. C. Joshi (1928–1983) from Belgaum, India was a nuclear physicist and the founder and head of the university department of physics, University of Mumbai. The university department of physics was established in 1971.

The University department of physics, under Joshi's guidance, took pioneering efforts in developing an Ion implantation facility in the early seventies and has been in the forefront in studying different aspects of ion beam modifications of material properties. Joshi guided several students for their PhDs in physics.

Joshi followed Gandhian way of life. After earning a PhD in physics in 1964 from Tata Institute of Fundamental Research, he worked with several projects from Bhabha Atomic Research Centre and Tata Institute of Fundamental Research. Before joining the department of physics, University of Mumbai in 1971 he was with the Institute of Physics, University of Uppsala, Uppsala, Sweden. Joshi nurtured the department of physics, University of Mumbai from its birth until he died in 1983, aged 55.

== Works ==
- M. C. Joshi, B. N. Subba Rao, B. V. Thosar, M1 transitions in 141 Pr and 191 Ir, - Il Nuovo Cimento (1955–1965), 1958 – Springer
- B. V. Thosar, M. C. Joshi, R. P. Sharma, K. G. Prasad, Internal conversion studies of the 2+→ 0+ transitions in some deformed even …

- Nuclear Physics, 1964 - Elsevier

- P. Sekhar, M. C. Joshi, K. L. Narsimhan and S. Guha, Solid State Communications, 26 (1978) 973
- L. E. Thailamani and M.C. Joshi, Nuclear Instruments and Methods, (1982)
- V. K. Asundi, M. C. Joshi et al., Radiation Effects, 49 (1980) 39

| Preceded by J. P. Joshi | Director General of the Archaeological Survey of India; 1989 - 1993 | Succeeded by Achala Moulik |
