= Yunas Samad =

British social scientist

Yunas Samad is a British social scientist whose research is at the interface of sociology, politics and history. He is Professor of South Asian Studies and the Director of the Ethnicity and Social Policy Research Centre (ESPRC) at the University of Bradford. He is an expert on the study of South Asia and its diaspora and has published several books on the topic of Pakistani nationalism, ethnicity, Islam and the war on terror. He regularly comments on the Muslim diaspora, politics and security issues in Pakistan for the BBC, the Dawn and other media outlets.

== Background ==
He was born in Lahore and his family migrated to the United Kingdom during his childhood. He was brought up and educated in South Merton, London. He is married and has one son. Prior to being an academic he worked in commerce and left as Managing Director of Samad Carpets, working in various offices across London, Lahore and Karachi.

== Education ==
He graduated with a B.A. Hons in History from the University of North London where he was a student of Denis Judd. He was then awarded a British Academy scholarship to study for a DPhil in Modern History at St Antony's College, Oxford University under the supervision of the Indian historian Professor Tapan Raychaudhuri.

== Academic career ==
He remained at St Antony's College, on a Wingate Scholarship as Associate Fellow of the Cecil Rhodes Chair of Race Relations and worked with the African historian Professor Terrence Ranger. He taught at AFRAS at Sussex University and then was a Research Fellow at the Centre for Research on Ethnic Relations, Warwick University working with the sociologist John Rex. He was appointed as a lecturer at Bradford University in 1994.

Samad's main areas of interest are transnationalism, ethnicity, nationalism, and identity politics in South Asia and Europe. He has conducted a number of funded projects, working for various organisations, such as the Foreign and Commonwealth Office, Economic Social Research Council, The European Commission and the Joseph Rowntree Foundation.

He was a member of the Expert Group on Humanities advising the European Commission on its FP 7 Research Programme (2005-6) and is a Trustee of the Charles Wallace Pakistan Trust (2010).

He has played a prominent role in the organisation of a number of learned societies and was Vice-chairman of the British Association for South Asian Studies (BASAS) (1999–2003), Executive Committee member of the European Association for South Asian Studies (EASAS)(1997–2003) and was Deputy Director of the South Asia Research Centre, Geneva (2004-8).

== Selected publications ==
- Pakistan-US Conundrum: Jihadis, Military and the People – the struggle for control, Hurst & Co, London, 2010.
- Muslim Community Cohesion: Bradford Report, Joseph Rowntree Foundation, York, 2010.
- With Gayen Pandey, Faultlines of Nationhood, Roli Press, New Delhi, 2007.
- With Kasturi Sen, Islam in the European Union: Muslim Youth and the War on Terror, Oxford University Press, Karachi, 2007.
- With John Eade, Community Perceptions of Forced Marriage, Foreign and Commonwealth Office, 2003.
- With T. Ranger, and O. Stuart (eds.) Culture Identity and Politics: Ethnic Minorities in Britain, Avebury, Aldershot, 1996.
- A Nation in Turmoil: Nationalism and Ethnicity in Pakistan 1937-58, Sage, New Delhi, 1995.

== See also ==
- Raymond Allchin
