= Ravindra Singh Bisht =

Indian archaeologist

Ravindra Bisht
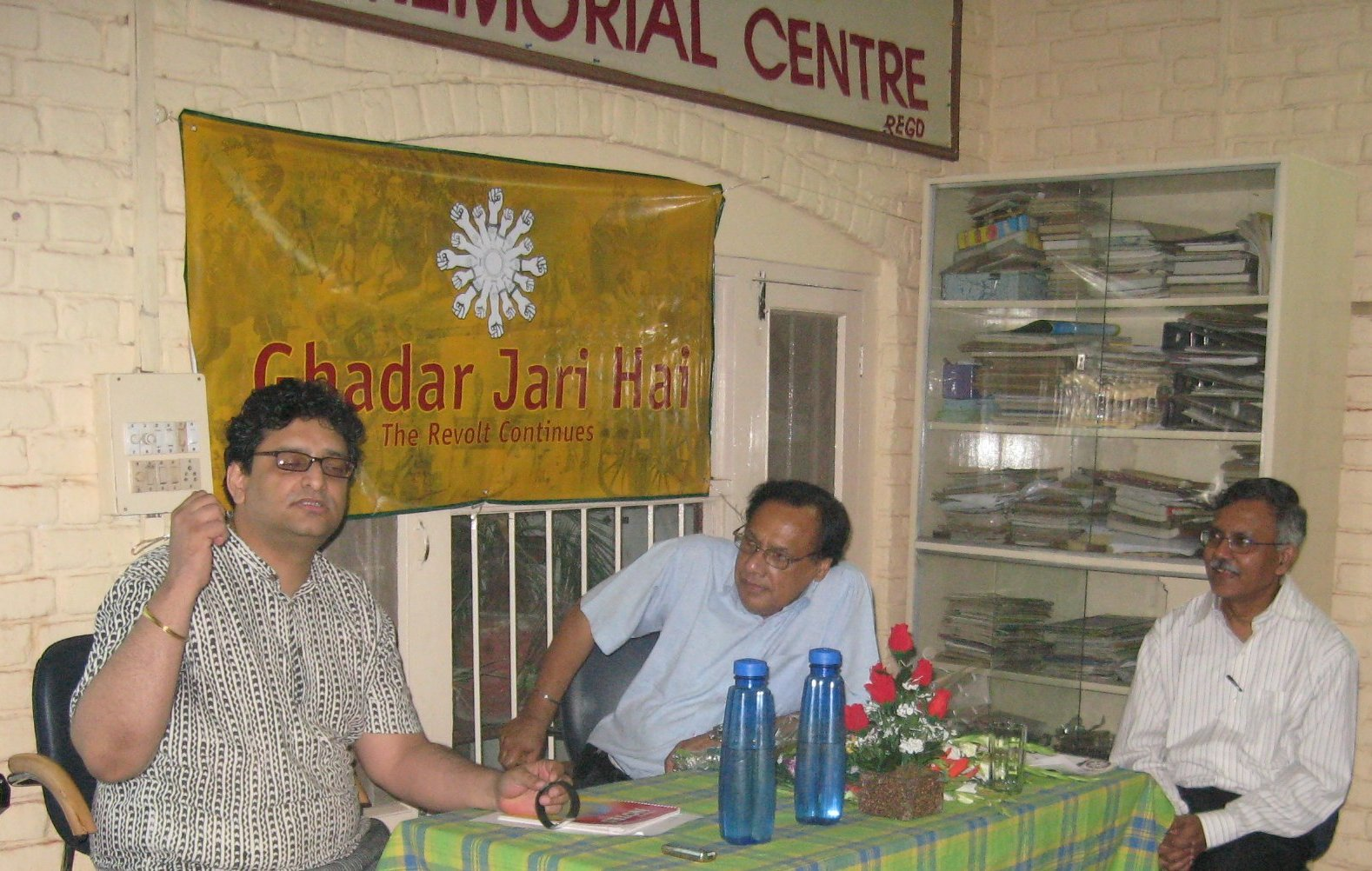
- Bisht (center) in 2008 at the launch of www.ghadar.in, the online presence of the magazine Ghadar Jari Hai
- Born: 2 January 1944 (age 82); Bhimtal, United Provinces, British Raj
- Occupation: archaeologist
- Children: Namit
- Parent: Lt. L. S. Bisht
- Awards: Padma Shri; Acharya Narendra Dev Alankar

Ravindra Singh Bisht (R. S. Bisht; born 2 January 1944) is an Indian archaeologist, known for his scholarship on Indus Valley Civilization and efforts to conserve Indian national monuments. He was honoured by the Government of India, in 2013, by bestowing on him the Padma Shri, the fourth highest civilian award, for his contributions to the field of archaeology.

== Biography ==
Dholavira adds a new dimension to the personality of the Indus civilisation, says Dr. Ravindra Singh Bisht, The city of Dholavira in its fullest form was a precisely proportionate whole and a proportionately resolved configuration, which followed a resolute set of principles of planning and architecture with mathematical precision and perhaps with astronomically established orientation.

Ravindra Singh Bisht was born on 2 January 1944, to Lt. L. S. Bisht, in the Indian state of Uttarakhand. His son is Namit Bisht and his grandson is Eshan Bisht. After schooling at local schools, he passed the degree of Visharad in 1958, followed by Sahityaratna, in 1960, becoming a Sanskrit scholar. Changing the course of his studies, Bisht secured his master's degree from the Lucknow University, in Ancient Indian History and Culture, in 1965. This was followed by post graduate diploma in Archaeology (PGDA), in 1967, from the School of Archaeology, run by the Archaeological Survey of India. In 2002, Ravindra Singh Bisht obtained his doctoral degree for his thesis, Emerging Perspectives of the Harrapan Civilizations in the Light of Recent Excavations at Banawali and Dholavira, from Kumaon University, to complete his academic studies.

Dr. Bisht started his career, joining the Department of Archaeology and Museum, Punjab, as the Senior Technical Assistant, in 1969. Later, he was transferred to the Department of Archaeology and Museum in Haryana as the AAO and rose to the post of the Deputy Director. He also had stints as the Superintending Archaeologist at various archaeological stations of the Archaeological Survey of India. Dr. Ravindra Singh Bisht retired after 35 years of service, as the Joint Director General, Archaeological Survey of India, on 31 January 2004 and lives at Rajendranagar, in the residential locality of Sahibabad, Ghaziabad, bordering the Indian capital of New Delhi.

== Career highlights and achievements ==
Dr. Bisht, generally considered to be an expert on Indus Valley Civilization, has led many excavations related to the study of the civilization. Excavation projects at Dholavira in Kutch district of Gujarat, Banawali in Hissar district of Haryana, Semthan in Pulwama district of Jammu and Kashmir, Chechal in Vaishali district, and Sarai Mound in Nalanda district of Bihar, and Sanghol in Ludhiana district of Punjab are some of them.

Another achievement credited to Dr. Bisht is the conservation of several Indian national monuments. During his stint as the Deputy Director stationed in Haryana, he was instrumental in the conservation of 11 monuments in Narnaul, the place where one of the first battles of Indian Rebellion of 1857 was fought by Pran Sukh Yadav and Rao Tula Ram against the British. He has assisted in the prelimniery survey and research of Ta Prohm, the Cambodian temple of 12th century. He was also involved in the conservation activities of several monuments in other north Indian states.

Another area of work of Dr. R. S. Bisht was in setting up and maintenance of museums across the country. He was involved in the establishment of Swatantrata Sangram Sangrahalaya museum at Red Fort, Delhi, Vishveshvaranand Vedic Research Institute museum in Hoshiarpur and the museum at the Department of Archaeology and Museum in Chandigarh. He has contributed towards the renovation, rearrangement and redesigning of museums at the Darbar Hall in Sangrur, Punjab, Darbar Hall, Old Fort, Patiala, Ratnagiri and Ropar. He has also played part in conducting several exhibitions such as the ones at Sultanpur Lodhi, Kurukshetra, Kamagata Maru nagar, and Rani ki vav, special displays of excavated materials from Banawali and Dholavira and an exclusive exhibition of Neolithic, Copper-Bronze age and Megalithic Cultures of India since Independence held at the National Museum, New Delhi, on the sidelines of the World Archaeological Congress of 1994.

Dr. Bisht is also known to have contributed towards the dissemination of knowledge by way of his activities in the realm of teaching. He was instrumental in designing training programmes, both class room and field trainings for the Archaeological Survey of India. He has also taught at the Institute of Archeology, New Delhi during a period from 1986 to 1997. He has also delivered special lectures at various colleges and institutes in India and once, in Sharon, Connecticut, USA, in 1992, when he delivered a lecture on Dolavira on invitation from the Association for Harappan Studies, USA. Dr. Bisht has also published several research articles. A New Model of Harappan Town Planning as Revealed at Dholavira, Kutch: A Surface Study of its Plan and Architecture, being a notable one.

== Positions held ==
During his career, Dr. Bisht held many positions in varying capacities. He was the Secretary of the Central Advisory Board of Archeology, Chairman of Committee of Experts for the Customs Department in Kandla and the Co-ordination Director of the multi disciplinary interim presentation on Ajanta and Ellora by the Geological Survey of India. He has served on the academic committees of Kumaon University and Kurukshetra University and Jnana Pravaha, the Centre for Cultural Studies and Research, Varanasi. He is a former member of the Indian Council of Historical Research, review committee of National Institute of Oceanography, Goa, Deccan College Post-Graduate and Research Institute, Pune, International Experts Panel Committee of Ajanta - Ellora Conservation and Tourism Development Project and the Committee for Re-organization of Department of Archeology, Museums and Archives, Government of Bihar. He was a member of the screening and evaluation committees of the Four Great Civilizations of the World: Indus Civilization exhibition, Mathura Objects and the South Korea Exhibition, in 1999, besides being a member of the Indian National Trust for Art and Cultural Heritage (INTACH) and the Indira Gandhi Rashtriya Manav Sangrahalaya, Bhopal.

== Awards and recognitions ==
The Government of India, in 2013, honoured Dr. Ravindra Singh Bisht, by awarding him the civilian honour of Padma Shri. He is also a recipient of the Acharya Narendra Dev Alankar, awarded to him, in 2013, by the Acharya Narendra Dev Shiksha Nidhi Evam Jan Niyojan Ayog, Uttar Pradesh, India.
