= Hathial =

- Location within Pakistan
- 33.75°N 72.825°E
- Type: Archaeological site
- Cultures: Gandhara

UNESCO World Heritage Site
- Official name: Taxila
- Criteria: iii, iv
- Designated: 1980
- Reference no.: 139

Taxila archaeological sites

Hathial is an ancient archaeological site next to Bhir Mound, just south of Sirkap, in the area of Taxila in Pakistan. It is quite a large site, in which red burnished ware and various materials were discovered similar to those of Charsadda. This suggest that the establishment of the Hathial site may go back as far as 1000 BCE. The adjoining settlement of Bhir Mound was only created later, probably around 500 BCE.

The pottery found at the site has been dated to the period between 1000 BCE and 400 BCE, and thus constitute an interesting intermediary, pre-Achaemenid period, between the Late Harappan of the Indus Valley and the Early Historic period.

== Bibliography ==
- Allchin, Bridget; Allchin, Raymond (1982), The Rise of Civilization in India and Pakistan, Cambridge University Press, ISBN 978-0-521-28550-6
- Allchin, F. Raymond (1993), "The Urban Position of Taxila and Its Place in Northwest India-Pakistan", Studies in the History of Art, 31: 69–81, JSTOR 42620473
- Olivelle, Patrick (2006), Between the Empires: Society in India 300 BCE to 400 CE, Oxford University Press, ISBN 978-0-19-977507-1
