= Harold Walter Bailey =

British scholar of Asian languages (1899–1996)

- Born: 16 December 1899; Devizes
- Died: 11 January 1996 (aged 96); Cambridge
- Occupation: Scholar

Sir Harold Walter Bailey, FBA (16 December 1899 – 11 January 1996), who published as H. W. Bailey, was an English scholar of Khotanese, Sanskrit, and the comparative study of Iranian languages.

== Life ==
Bailey was born in Devizes, Wiltshire, and raised from age 10 onwards on a farm in Nangeenan, Western Australia, without formal education. While growing up, he learned German, Italian, Spanish, Latin, and Greek from household books, and Russian from a neighbour. After he grew interested in the lettering on tea-chests from India, he acquired a book of Bible selections translated into languages with non-European scripts, including Tamil, Arabic, and Japanese. By the time he had left home, he was reading Avestan as well.

In 1921 he entered the University of Western Australia to study classics. In 1927, after completing his master's degree on Euripides, he won a Hackett Studentship to Oxford where he joined the Delegacy of Non-Collegiate Students, later St Catherine's College. There he studied under Frederick William Thomas. In 1928 he was awarded the inaugural Nubar Pasha Scholarship in Armenian studies. The eminent Oxford Arabist David Margoliouth is said to have asked, upon awarding Bailey the scholarship, "By the way, Mr Bailey, do you intend actually to learn Armenian?".

After graduating with first class honours in 1929, Bailey was appointed as Parsee Community Lecturer in the then London School of Oriental Studies. In 1936 Bailey became Professor of Sanskrit (succeeding E. J. Rapson, who had held the post since 1906) and a Fellow at Queens' College, Cambridge; he was succeeded at SOAS by W. B. Henning. During World War II he worked in the Royal Institute of International Affairs.

Bailey was not religious in his personal life. He was a vegetarian and enjoyed playing the violin. He retired in 1967. After his death, he left his enormous library to the Ancient India and Iran Trust in Cambridge.

== Work ==
Bailey has been described as one of the greatest Orientalists of the twentieth century. He was said to read more than 50 languages.

In 1929 Bailey began his doctoral dissertation, a translation with notes of the Greater Bundahishn, a compendium of Zoroastrian writings in Middle Persian recorded in the Pahlavi scripts. He became the world's leading expert in the Khotanese dialect of the Saka language, the mediaeval Iranian language of the Kingdom of Khotan (modern Xinjiang). His initial motivation for the study of Khotanese was an interest in the possible connection with the Bundahishn. He later passed his material on that work to Kaj Barr.

He was known for his immensely erudite lectures, and once confessed: "I have talked for ten and a half hours on the problem of one word without approaching the further problem of its meaning."

== Selected publications ==
- Codices khotanenses, Copenhagen : Levin & Munksgaard, 1938.
- Zoroastrian problems in the ninth-century books, Oxford : The Clarendon press, 1943.
- Khotanese texts, Cambridge : The University Press, 1945
- Khotanese Buddhist texts, London : Taylor's Foreign Press, 1951.
- Sad-dharma-puṇḍarīka-sūtra [the summary in Khotan Saka by], Canberra : Australian National University, Faculty of Asian Studies, 1971.
- Dictionary of Khotan Saka. Cambridge University Press. 1979. 1st Paperback edition 2010. ISBN 978-0-521-14250-2.
- The culture of the Sakas in ancient Iranian Khotan, Delmar, N.Y. : Caravan Books, 1982.

== Honours and awards ==
Bailey was elected a Fellow of the British Academy in 1944, and subsequently a member of the Danish, Norwegian and Swedish Academies. He received honorary degrees from four universities including Oxford; served as president of Philological Society, the Royal Asiatic Society, the Society for Afghan Studies, and the Society of Mithraic Studies; and chaired the Anglo-Iranian Society and Ancient India and Iran Trust. He was knighted for services to Oriental studies in 1960. He was also a Fellow of the Australian Academy of the Humanities.
