= Robin Dennell =

British prehistoric archaeologist

Robin Dennell FBA
- Born: 1947 (age 78–79)

Academic background
- Education: University of Cambridge (BA, 1969; PhD, 1977)
- Thesis: Early Farming in South Bulgaria from the VI to the III Millennia B.C. (1977)

Academic work
- Discipline: Archaeology
- Sub-discipline: Palaeolithic archaeology
- Institutions: University of Sheffield (1973–2009); University of Exeter (2013–)

Robin W. Dennell FBA (born 1947) is a British prehistoric archaeologist specialising in early hominin expansions out of Africa and the Palaeolithic of Pakistan and China. He is Professor Emeritus of Human Origins of the University of Sheffield, and an honorary professor at the University of Exeter.

== Education and career ==
Dennell studied at the University of Cambridge, where he received a bachelor's degree in 1969 and a PhD in 1977. His doctoral thesis was titled, Early farming in South Bulgaria: 6th to 3rd Millenium b.c., and was published as a volume in the British Archaeological Reports International Series in 1978.

He joined the University of Sheffield in 1973, and became a senior lecturer in 1983, a reader in 1994, and a professor in 1995. He was also the Field Director of the British Archaeological Mission to Pakistan between 1988 and 1999, and the head of the archaeology department at Sheffield between 1999 and 2002. After taking voluntary redundancy from Sheffield in 2009, Dennell joined the University of Exeter as an honorary professor in 2013.

Dennell was elected a Fellow of the British Academy in 2012, and is a member of the International Council on Monuments and Sites.

== Selected publications ==
- Dennell, Robin (1978). Early Farming in South Bulgaria from the VI to the III Millennia B.C. British Archaeological Reports International Series 45. Oxford: Archaeopress. ISBN 9780860540212.
- Dennell, Robin (1983). European economic prehistory: a new approach. London: Academic Press. ISBN 978-0122091803.
- Rendell, H. M.; Dennell, R. W.; Halim, M. A. (1989). Pleistocene and Palaeolithic Investigations in the Soan Valley, Northern Pakistan. British Archaeological Reports International Series 544. Oxford: Archaeopress. ISBN 9780860546917.
- Dennell, Robin (2004). Early Hominin Landscapes in Northern Pakistan: Investigations in the Pabbi Hills. British Archaeological Reports International Series 1265. Oxford: Archaeopress. ISBN 9781841713717.
- Dennell, Robin (2008). The Palaeolithic Settlement of Asia. Cambridge: Cambridge University Press. doi:10.1017/CBO9780511818882. ISBN 9780511818882.
