= Bridget Allchin =

English archaeologist, specializing in South Asian archaeology

Bridget Allchin FSA
- Born: Bridget Gordon; 10 February 1927; Oxford, Oxfordshire, England
- Died: 27 June 2017 (aged 90); Norwich, Norfolk, England
- Spouse: Raymond Allchin (m. 1951; died 2010)

Academic background
- Education: University College London; University of Cape Town; Institute of Archaeology

Academic work
- Discipline: Archaeologist
- Sub-discipline: South Asian archaeology; lithic analysis; ethnoarchaeology
- Institutions: Wolfson College, Cambridge

Bridget Allchin FSA (10 February 1927 – 27 June 2017) was an archaeologist who specialised in South Asian archaeology. She published books, some co-authored with her husband, Raymond Allchin (1923–2010).

== Background ==
She was born Bridget Gordon, in Oxford on 10 February 1927. She was the daughter of Major Stephen Gordon of the Indian Army Medical Service and his wife Elsie (née Cox). Her doctor father was from a family of medical practitioners, including Dr Thomas Monro, an ancestor who had attempted to treat the 'madness' of George III. Bridget was raised on a farm in Galloway in lowland Scotland, which she largely ran with her mother during the Second World War with the assistance of prisoners of war. Bridget started a degree in History and Ancient History at University College London but, at the end of her first year, left for South Africa when her parents decided to emigrate. Interested in the culture of neighbouring Basutoland, Bridget persuaded her parents to let her leave the farm and recommence her studies. Enrolling at the University of Cape Town she read African Studies, which included anthropology, archaeology and an African language. While there, she learnt to speak Sesotho and took up flying lessons.

Taught by Professor Isaac Shapira and Dr A. J. H. Goodwin, Bridget developed a specialism in the South African Stone Age but decided to return to England and in 1950 she began a PhD at the Institute of Archaeology studying under Professor Frederick Zeuner to broaden her knowledge of the lithic industries of the Old World.

== Career ==
It was here in 1950 that Bridget met fellow PhD student Raymond Allchin and married in March 1951. Travelling to India for the first time with Raymond in 1951, Bridget steadily but firmly established herself as the most prominent South Asian Prehistorian in the UK. A pioneering female field-archaeologist in South Asia at a time when there were none, Bridget's research interests and publications were to stretch across South Asia from Afghanistan to Sri Lanka. At first Bridget's academic and organisational skills were dedicated to supporting Raymond's fieldwork but, despite not holding a full-time academic post, she successfully raised funds and established a number of innovative field projects. This included directing fieldwork in the Great Thar Desert with Professor K. T. M. Hegde of the M.S. University of Baroda and Professor Andrew Goudie of the University of Oxford. Bridget subsequently developed links with the Pakistan Geological Survey and played a critical role in initiating collaborations which resulted in a survey of the Potwar Plateau directed by Professor Robin Dennell of the University of Sheffield and Professor Helen Rendell of the University of Sussex to search for Palaeolithic industries during the second phase of the British Archaeological Mission to Pakistan with the support of the Leverhulme Trust.

An independent author and researcher in her own right, she published The Stone-Tipped Arrow: a Study of Late Stone Age Cultures of the Tropical Regions of the Old World (1966) and The Prehistory and Palaeography of the Great Indian Desert (with Andrew Goudie and K. T. M. Hegde: 1978) and Living Traditions: Studies in the Ethnoarchaeology of South Asia (1994).

Away from the field, Bridget held the role of founding Editor of the journal South Asian Studies for over a decade and was Fellow of the Society of Antiquaries (FSA) and a Fellow of Wolfson College, Cambridge. She was a founding trustee of the Ancient India and Iran Trust and was its Secretary and chairman, as well as founding member and Secretary General of the European Association of South Asian Archaeologists, editing a number of its proceedings.

She died in Norwich on 27 June 2017 at the age of 90. She is survived by her two children, Sushila and William.

== Awards and recognition ==
Allchin was awarded the Royal Asiatic Society Gold Medal in 2014 for her leading work in South Asia. The Annual Allchin Symposium of South Asian Archaeology is named in honour of Allchin and her husband.

== Selected works ==
- The Stone Tipped Arrow (1966)
- The Prehistory and Palaeogeography of the Great Indian Desert (1978)
- The Rise of Civilization in India and Pakistan (1982) with F. Raymond Allchin
- From the Oxus to Mysore in 1951: The Start of a Great Partnership in Indian Scholarship (Hardinge Simpole, 2012) with F. Raymond Allchin

== Publications ==
=== Joint publications ===
- Allchin, Bridget, and F. Raymond Allchin 1968. The Birth of Indian Civilization: India and Pakistan Before 500 B.C. Harmondsworth: Penguin Books.
- Allchin, Bridget, and F. Raymond Allchin 1982. The Rise of Civilization in India and Pakistan. Cambridge: Cambridge University Press.
- Allchin, Bridget, and F. Raymond Allchin 1997. Origins of a Civilization: The Prehistory and Early Archaeology of South Asia. New Delhi: Viking.
- Allchin, F. Raymond, and Bridget Allchin 2012. From the Oxus to Mysore in 1951: The start of a great partnership in Indian Archaeology. Kilkerran: Hardinge Simpole

=== Publications by Bridget Allchin ===
Extended content
- Allchin, Bridget 1966. The Stone-Tipped Arrow; Late Stone-Age Hunters of the Tropical Old World. New York: Barnes & Noble.
- Allchin, Bridget 1972. Hunters or Pastoral Nomads?: Late Stone Age Settlements in Western and Central India. London: Duckworth.
- Allchin, Bridget 1973. Environment, Time and Technology: The Flake Tradition and Blade and Burin Traditions in Western India. Bombay: Tata Institute of Fundamental Research.
- Allchin, Bridget 1994. Living Traditions: Studies in the Ethnoarchaeology of South Asia. Oxford: Oxbow Books.
- Petraglia, Michael D., and Bridget Allchin (eds.) 2007. The Evolution and History of Human Populations in South Asia Inter-Disciplinary Studies in Archaeology, Biological Anthropology, Linguistics and Genetics. Dordrecht, the Netherlands: Springer.
- Allchin, Bridget 1952. "A study of some Palaeolithic artefacts from South India". Current Science 21: 268–271.
- Allchin, Bridget 1957. "Australian Stone Industries, Past and Present". Journal of the Royal Anthropological Institute of Great Britain and Ireland, 87, no. 1: 115–136.
- Allchin, Bridget 1958. "The Late Stone Age of Ceylon". Journal of the Anthropological Institute of Great Britain and Ireland. 88, no. 2: 179–201.
- Allchin, B. 1959. "The Indian Middle Stone Age: Some New Sites in Central and Southern India". Bulletin of the London University Institute of Archaeology 2: 1–36.
- Allchin, Bridget 1960. Review of Stone Age Industries of the Bombay and Satara Districts. by S. C. Malik. Man 60: 95.
- Allchin, Bridget 1960. "196. Central Indian Prehistory: The Carlyle Collections". Man. 60, no. 9: 155–156.
- Allchin, Bridget and J. Desmond Clark and C. B. M. McBurney and Sonia Cole 1961. "The Pelican Prehistories". Journal of African History. 2, no. 1: 153–154.
- Allchin, Bridget 1963. "The Indian Stone Age Sequence". The Journal of the Royal Anthropological Institute of Great Britain and Ireland 93, no. 2: 210–234.
- Allchin, Bridget 1966. "The Stone Age of India in relation to surrounding regions of the Old World". Proceedings of the Sixth International Congress of Prehistoric and Protohistoric Sciences (Rome, 29 August–3 September 1962). Rome, 250–255.
- Allchin, Bridget and K. T. M. Hegde 1968. "The background of early man in the Narmada valley, Gujarat: a preliminary report of the 1969 season's fieldwork". Journal of the M.S.U. Baroda 17, no.1: 141–145.
- Allchin, Bridget and Andrew Goudie. 1971. "Dunes, Aridity and Early Man in Gujarat, Western India". Man. 6, no. 2: 248–265.
- Allchin, Bridget, K. T. M. Hegde and Andrew Goudie 1972. "Prehistory and Environmental Change in Western India: A Note on the Budha Pushkar Basin, Rajasthan". Man. 7, no. 4: 541–564.
- Allchin, Bridget, K. T. M. Hegde and Andrew Goudie 1972. "The background of early man in Gujarat, a preliminary report of the Cambridge – Baroda Expedition, 1970–71 season. Journal of the M.S.U. Baroda 19, no.1: 15–32.
- Allchin, Bridget 1972. "Hunters or pastoral nomads? Late Stone Age settlements in Western and Central India". In: P. J. Ucko, R. Tringham and G. W. Dimbleby (eds.), Man, Settlement and Urbanism. London: Duckworth, 115–119.
- Allchin, Bridget 1973. "Blade and burin industries of West Pakistan and Western India." In: N. Hammond (ed.), South Asian Archaeology 1971, London: Duckworth, 39–50.
- Allchin, Bridget 1973. "Environment, time and technology: the flake tradition and the blade and burin traditions in Western India." In: D.P. Agrawal and A. Ghosh (eds.), Radiocarbon and Indian Archaeology. Bombay: Tata Institute of Fundamental Research, 18–22.
- Goudie, Andrew, Bridget Allchin and K. T. M. Hegde 1973. "The former extensions of the Great Indian Sand Desert". The Geographical Journal 139, no.2: 243–257.
- Allchin, Bridget 1974. Siddhpur and Barkachha: two Stone Age factory sites in Uttar Pradesh". In: A.K. Ghosh (ed.), Perspectives in Palaeoanthropology. Professor D. Sen Festschrift. Calcutta: Firma K. L. Mukhopadhyay, 235–248.
- Allchin, Bridget 1974. "Stone age man in Rajasthan". The Researcher, Bulletin of Rajasthan's Archaeology and Museums 14.
- Allchin, Bridget and Andrew Goudie 1974. "Pushkar: Prehistory and Climatic Change in Western India". World Archaeology. 5, no. 3: 358–368.
- Allchin, Bridget and Andrew Goudie 1974. "Prehistoric geography of the margins of the Indian desert: an interim report of the Cambridge – Oxford – Baroda project". In: J.E. van Lohuizen-de Leeuw and J.M.M. Ubaghs (eds.), South Asian Archaeology 1973. Papers from the second International Conference of the Association for the Promotion of South Asian Archaeology in Western Europe, held in the University of Amsterdam. Leiden, E. J. Brill, 63–70.
- Allchin, Bridget 1976. "Palaeolithic Sites in the Plains of Sind and Their Geographical Implications". Geographical Journal. 142, no. 3: 471–489.
- Allchin, Bridget 1977. "Hunters, pastoralists and early agriculturalists in South Asia". In: J.V.S. Megaw (ed.), Hunters Gatherers and First Farmers Beyond Europe: an Archaeological Survey. Leicester: Leicester University Press, 127–144.
- Allchin, Bridget and Andrew Goudie 1978. "Climatic change in the Indian desert and North-west India during the late Pleistocene and early Holocene". In: W.C. Brice (ed.), The Environmental History of the Near and Middle East Since the Last Ice Age. London: Academic Press, 307–318.
- Allchin, Bridget 1979. The agate and carnelian industry in western India and Pakistan. In: J.E. van Lohuizen-de Leeuw (ed.), South Asian Archaeology 1975. Papers from the Third International Conference of the Association of South Asian Archaeologists in Western Europe held in Paris. Leiden: Brill, 91–105.
- Allchin, Bridget 1979. "Stone blade industries of early settlements in Sind as indicators of geographical and socio-economic change". In: M. Taddei (ed.), South Asian Archaeology 1977.
- Papers from the Fourth International Conference of the Association of South Asian Archaeologists in Western Europe, held in the Istituto Universitario Orientale, Naples. Naples: Istituto Universitario Orientale, 173–211.
- Allchin, Bridget 1980. "Observations on the nature and development of Middle and Upper Palaeolithic industries in the Thar Desert during the last Pleistocene humid phase". Man and Environment 4.
- Allchin, Bridget 1980. "The prehistory of Tadjikistan, Soviet Central Asia". Antiquity 54: 55–58.
- Allchin, Bridget 1980. "Notes on the teris of Tamilnadu coast, South India". In: Th. T P Gunawardana, L. Prematilleke, R. Silva (eds.), P.E.P. Deraniyagala Commemoration Volume. Colombo, Sri Lanka: Lake House Investments Ltd., 60–63.
- Allchin Bridget 1981. "Stone industries of Lewan, Tarakai Quila and Lak Largai in the Bannu basin". In: H. Härtel (ed.), South Asian Archaeology 1979. Papers from the fifth International Conference of the Association of South Asian Archaeologists in Western Europe held in the Museum für Indische Kunst der Staalichen Museen Preussischer Kulturbesitz Berlin. Berlin: D. Reimer Verlag, 233–239.
- Allchin Bridget 1981. "The Palaeolithic of the Potwar Plateau Punjab, Pakistan; A Fresh Approach. Paléorient 7, no.1: 123–134.
- Allchin Bridget 1981. "Archaeological indications of the role of Nomadism in the Indus civilization and their potential significance for the movements of the Indo-Aryans into the Indian subcontinent". In: B.A. Litvinsky (ed.), Ètnicheskiye problemy istorii Tsentral'noi Azii v drevnosti (II tysyacheletiye do n.è.) / Ethnic Problems of the History of Central Asia in the Early Period (2nd Millennium B.C.). Moscow, 321–325.
- Allchin, Bridget 1982. "Substitute stones". In: G.L. Possehl (ed.), Harappan Civilization: a contemporary perspective. Warminster: Aris & Phillips in co-operation with American Institute of Indian Studies, 233–238.
- Allchin, Bridget 1985. "Ethnoarchaeology in South Asia". In: J. Schotsmans and M. Taddei (eds.), South Asian Archaeology 1983. Papers from the seventh international conference of the Association of South Asian Archaeologists in Western Europe, held in the Musées Royaux d'Art et d'Histoire, Brussels. Naples: Istituto Universitario Orientale, Dipartimento di Studi Asiatici, 21–33 (Istituto Universitario Orientale, Dipartimento di Studi Asiatici, Series Minor 23).
- Allchin, Bridget 1986. "The Site of Lewan. 3.2 The Ground, Pecked and Polished or Heavy Stone Artefacts". In: F. Raymond Allchin, Bridget Allchin, F. A. Durrani and M. Farid Khan (eds.), Lewan and the Bannu Basin, 41–64.
- Allchin, Bridget 1986. "The Site of Lewan. 3.3 The Microlithic Industry". In: F. Raymond Allchin, Bridget Allchin, F. A. Durrani and M. Farid Khan (eds.), Lewan and the Bannu Basin, 65–80.
- Allchin, Bridget 1986. "The Site of Lewan. 3.4 The Bead-Working Area". In: F. Raymond Allchin, Bridget Allchin, F. A. Durrani and M. Farid Khan (eds.), Lewan and the Bannu Basin, 81–87.
- Allchin, Bridget 1986. "The Excavations. 4.3 The Stone Blade Industry from the Excavations". In: F. Raymond Allchin, Bridget Allchin, F. A. Durrani and M. Farid Khan (eds.), Lewan and the Bannu Basin, 113–115.
- Allchin, Bridget 1986. "The Excavations. 4.4 The Heavy stone Artefacts from the Excavations". In: F. Raymond Allchin, Bridget Allchin, F. A. Durrani and M. Farid Khan (eds.), Lewan and the Bannu Basin, 117–119.
- Allchin, Bridget 1986. "Earliest traces of man in the Potwar Plateau, Pakistan: a report of the British Archaeological Mission to Pakistan". South Asian Studies 2, no.1: 69–83.
- Allchin, Bridget 1987. "South Asian Rock Art". Journal of the Royal Society of Arts 135, no. 5366: 138–155 (The Sir George Birdwood memorial lecture 1986).
- Allchin, Bridget 1987. "1985–1986 Report of the British Archaeological Mission to Pakistan on its British-Pakistan Palaeolithic Project". South Asian Studies 3: 91–94.
- Dennell, Robin W. and Bridget Allchin 1988. "Report of the British Archaeological Mission to Pakistan Palaeolithic Project, 1987". South Asian Studies 4: 145–147.
- Allchin, Bridget 1992. "Middle Palaeolithic Cultures". In: A.H. Dani and V.M. Masson (eds.), History of Civilizations of Central Asia. Volume I: The Dawn of Civilization: Earliest Times to 700 B.C. Paris: UNESCO Publishing, 65–88.

== See also ==
- Andrew Goudie
- Elena Kuzmina
