= Mirchpur =

- Location in Haryana Mirchpur (India)
- Coordinates: 29.316027°N 76.175476°E
- Country: India
- State: Haryana
- District: Hisar district
- Municipality: Narnaund

Population (2011)
  - Total: 8,737
- Postal code: 125039
- ISO 3166 code: IN-HR
- Website: www.hisar.nic.in

Mirchpur is an Indus Valley Civilization site and village in Narnaund, Hissar district, Haryana, India.

== Demographics of 2011 ==
As of 2011 India census, Mirchpur had a population of 8737 residing in 1670 households. Among the population, Males (4706) constitute 53.85% and females constitute (4031) 46.13%. The average literacy (5498) rate in Mirchpur is 62.92%, which is lower than the national average of 74%. The male literacy rate (3464) is 63%, while the female literacy rate (2034) is 36.99%, out of the total literates (5498) in the village. In Mirchpur, Hisar, approximately 10.91% of the population is under 6 years of age (954). Scheduled Castes constitutes 17.81% of total population village at 1556 out of 8737.

== Indus Valley Civilization Site ==
Sisai is an Indus Valley Civilization site with three mounds Sisai 1, Sisai 2 and Sisai 2.

Bolstering the status of Rakhigarhi as the largest Indus Valley Civilization metropolis on the banks of Drishadvati river (current day paleochannel of Chautang), at least 23 other Indus Valley Civilization sites within 5 km (at 4 sites), 10 km (at least 10 sites) and 15 km (at least 9 sites) radius of Rakhigarhi have been discovered till 2001. Some of the raw materials were procured from the nodal Rakhigarhi site and finished products were brought back to the nodal Rakhigarhi site for marketing.

Within 5 km radius are early Harappan (4600 BCE - 2800 BCE) site of Gamra and mature Harappan (2600 BCE - 1400 BCE) sites of Budana, Haibatpur and Lohari Ragho 3.

Within 5 km to 10 km radius, early Harappan sites are Lohari Ragho 1 Lohari Ragho 2 and Kheri Lochab-Kheri Jalab. Mature Harappan small farmstead sites are Milakpur No.1(Hisar) and Gunkali. Small farmstead sites of Kinnar, Nara and Mirchpur have material from both mature and late Harappan period. late Harappan (after 1400 BCE) sites are Sotha and Gandaswala Khera.

Within 5 km to 10 km radius are early, mature and late Harrpan sites. To the north-west of Rakhigarhi are Panhari, Gyanpura, Sotha, Kagsar, Sulchani and south-west of Rakhigarhi are Sisai 1, 2 and 3, Rajpura 2, Pali and Masudpur.

== Mirchpur Dalit killings incident ==
In 2010, Jai Prakash's house at Dalit Valmiki community colony of Mirchpur has a 2 year old dog named Ruby, which allegedly barked at some 10 to 15 drunk boys from Jat community drove on motorcycles in front of his house. One of the Jat boys, Rajinder Pali hurled a brick at the dog which was objected by a young Dalit boy named Yogesh which lead to physical fight between them. Jat boys threatened Dalits of dire consequences for this. Later. two Balmiki elders named Veer Bhan and Karan Singh apologized to Jat elders and still got beaten by them. Narnaund's Station House Officer (SHO) Vinod Kumar Kajal was close to a prominent Jat of Mirchpur. On 21 April 2010 all Dalit men were invited for a compromise to another place. In their absence, 300 to 400 Jat men, women came with jerry cans of kerosene and petrol, agricultural implements and lathis first ransacking jewels, cash, clothes in the houses and then setting the homes ablaze with Dalit women and kids inside. This led to Death by burning of 70-year-old Tara Chand and his 18-year-old physically challenged daughter Suman in fire. After this incident, 200 Dalit families left the village fearing for their safety. Only 50 families remained with a group of 75 CRPF personnel deployed in the village. Police named 103 people in the charge sheet out of which 5 were juveniles. In September 2011, 15 people were convicted and 82 acquitted by a Sessions court. CRPF was withdrawn in December 2016. In January 2017, Shiv Kumar a 17-year-old Dalit boy (also a district-level athlete) won a cash prize of Rs 1,500 in the cycle-stunt competition at a local playground. including Jats allegedly passing casteist remarks against him which led to a fight where nine Dalit youths, aged between 14 and 25, were severely injured. After this incident remaining 40 Dalit families also left the village. On 24 August 2018, in a landmark judgement Delhi High Court reversed the acquittal of 20 accused and upheld the conviction of 13 others in the case with enhanced punishment for nine of them. A bench of justices S Muralidhar and I S Mehta observed

The incidents of April 21, 2010 constituted an act of deliberate targeting of Balmiki houses by Jats, setting them on fire in a pre-planned and carefully orchestrated manner. It was pursuant to a conspiracy by the Jats to ‘teach the Balmikis a lesson’.

The statement that atrocities by those belonging to dominant castes against Scheduled Castes have shown no sign of abating even after 71 years of Independence forms part of the 209-page judgement authored by Justice S Muralidhar. After the verdict, two police companies were deployed in Mirchpur under the charge of duty magistrate and DSP. The next day, witnesses in the case didn't step out for work fearing backlash of the verdict.

== See also ==
- List of Indus Valley Civilization sites
