= Sisai, Hisar =

Sisai
- Municipal Committee
- Sisai in Haryana, India Sisai (India)
- Coordinates: 29°17′27″N 76°00′13″E
- Country: India
- State: Haryana
- District: Hisar
- Established: 4700 BC
- Founder: Ch.Shisram Kaliraman (1400 AD)

Government
  - Type: urban Local government
  - Body: Municipal committee

Population
  - Total: under construction

Languages
  - Official: Hindi
- Time zone: UTC+5:30 (IST)
- Vehicle registration: HR
- Website: haryana.gov.in

Sisai is a village situated 10 kilometres (6.2 mi) from Hansi tehsil in Hisar district in the Indian state of Haryana. The village was established by "Shisram Kaliraman "on whose name the village is named "Sisai". It is a prominent village of Kaliraman Jats and serves as headquarters of Akhil Bharatiya Kaliraman Khap. Kaliraman and Sihag are the gotras of Jats in this village.There are two panas in this village, Sisai Kaliraman and Sisai Bola. Master Chandgi Ram Pehlwan (Hind Kesari) also belonged to this village. It is the largest village not having a police station. Altius and eklvya public schools are proceeding towards making this village "wrestling Hub".

== Demography ==
The village is the biggest in Haryana in term of population and is divided into the two panchayats of Sisai Kaliramana and sihag bolan. The village comes under Narnaund Vidhan Sabha Constituency.

== Location ==
Nearby villages include Bara, Dhanipal, Mahjot, Masudpur, Datta, Gangan Kheri, Madha, Rajpura, Dhani Kumaran, Moth Rangdan, and Lohari Ragho, saini pura.

Sisai has a government run English medium school model sanskriti Sr. Sec. and is part of the Hisar Lok Sabha constituency.

== Indus Valley Civilization Site ==
Sisai is an Indus Valley Civilization site with three mounds Sisai 1, Sisai 2 and Sisai 2.

Bolstering the status of Rakhigarhi as the largest Indus Valley Civilization metropolis on the banks of Drishadvati river (current day paleochannel of Chautang), at least 23 other Indus Valley Civilization sites within 5 km (at 4 sites), 10 km (at least 10 sites) and 15 km (at least 9 sites) radius of Rakhigarhi have been discovered till 2001. Some of the raw materials were procured from the nodal Rakhigarhi site and finished products were brought back to the nodal Rakhigarhi site for marketing.

Within 5 km radius are early Harappan (4600 BCE - 2800 BCE) site of Gamra and mature Harappan (2600 BCE - 1400 BCE) sites of Budana, Haibatpur and Lohari Ragho 3.

Within 5 km to 10 km radius, early Harappan sites are Lohari Ragho 1 Lohari Ragho 2 and Kheri Lochab-Kheri Jalab. Mature Harappan small farmstead sites are Milakpur and Gunkali. Small farmstead sites of Kinnar, Nara and Mirchpur have material from both mature and late Harappan period. late Harappan (after 1400 BCE) sites are Sotha and Gandaswala Khera.

Within 5 km to 10 km radius are early, mature and late Harrpan sites. To the north-west of Rakhigarhi are Panhari, Gyanpura, Sotha, Kagsar, Sulchani and south-west of Rakhigarhi are Sisai 1, 2 and 3, Rajpura 2, Pali and Masudpur.

== See also ==
- List of Indus Valley Civilization sites
