= Hansi district =

- District of Haryana
- Country: India
- State: Haryana
- Division: Hisar division
- Established: 22 December 2025
- Headquarters: Hansi
- Tehsils: Hansi, Narnaund and Bass

Government
  - Deputy Commissioner: Rahul Narwal, IAS

Area
  - Total: 1,350 km^{2} (520 sq mi)

Population (2011)
  - Total: 540,994
  - Density: 409/km^{2} (1,060/sq mi)

Demographics

Languages
  - Official: Hindi
  - Additional official: English and Punjabi
  - Regional: Haryanvi
- Time zone: UTC+05:30 (IST)
- ISO 3166 code: IN-HR
- Lok Sabha constituency: Hisar
- Vidhan Sabha constituency: Hansi and Narnaund
- Website: https://hansi.haryana.gov.in/

Hansi district is a district in Haryana, India. Headquarter at Hansi city, entailing two sub-divisions Hansi and Narnaund, the district is part of Hisar revenue division. It is located on NH-9 at a distance of 26 kilometres (16 mi) east of Hisar .

== Etymology ==
The name Hansi is believed to have evolved from ancient names such as ''Asi'' or ''Asikare'', which are mentioned in Panini's Ashtadhyayi. The city was also historically known as ''Asigarh'', a name derived from its renowned sword-making industry and fort, Asigarh Fort.

According to another tradition, Hansi was founded by the Raja Anangpal Tomar in honor of his guru, Hansakar. Some sources also suggest that the city's name may have originated from the term Hamsi (meaning “swan”), symbolizing beauty, thus describing Hansi as a “beautiful city.”

== History ==
=== Administrative history ===
Hansi was established in 735 CE by Anangpal Tomar, the Tomar king of Delhi, while Hisar was founded in 1354 CE as 'Hisar-e-Firoza' by Firoz Shah Tughlaq (r. 1351-1388 CE). Hansi was originally named Asika, after Anangpal's daughter, Hanswati. king Prithviraj Chauhan, later built the massive Asigarh Fort (also known as Hansi Fort) on the site to defend against invaders from the northwest.

During the Sultanate period (c. 1206–1526), Hansi was an iqta, and a pargana during the Mughal rule (c. 1526–1798). Before the British raj took over in 1803 following their victory in the Second Anglo-Maratha War, Hansi had also served as the capital for the independent kingdom of the Irish adventurer George Thomas from 1798 to 1801 CE. In 1803, the British established a major cantonment at Hansi, where units like Skinner’s Horse (which still exists in the Indian Army today) were founded. From 1819 to 1832 CE, Hansi was the district headquarters in Northern Division of Delhi Territory of Bengal Presidency under the British colonial rule who moved the headquarters to Hisar and renamed the Hansi district to Hisar district. When Hisar was designated as a district headquarters in 1832, it was part of the Delhi Territory, which was then an administrative division under the Bengal Presidency. Shortly after, between 1833 and 1836, the Delhi Territory was incorporated into the newly formed North-Western Provinces (NWP). Following the Indian Rebellion of 1857, the district was transferred from the North-Western Provinces to the Punjab Province in 1858. Hisar, including its Hans tehsil, remained part of the Punjab until 1966, when it became one of the original seven districts of the newly created state of Haryana.

On 16th December 2025, Hansi was announced as a new district by the Nayab Singh Saini, Chief Minister of Haryana, and notified on 22 December 2025 as the 23rd district of Haryana after carving it out of the existing Hisar district. On 31 December 2025, Rahul Narwal was appointed as the first Deputy commissioner of the newly formed Hansi district against the vacant post with immediate effect.

=== Historic sites ===
==== Asigarh Fort ====
Asigarh Fort, is a prominent and historic feature of this ancient city. Extended in an area of 30 acres (120,000 m^{2}), it is square in shape and has security posts in all the four corners.

==== Baba Jaggannathpuri 16th century monument ====
Baba Jaggannathpuri Samadha temple, a samadhi (shrine of a revered Hindu saint) dedicated to the 16th century Hindu Sadhu (saint), Jaggannathpuri, at the spot where he established an ashram (monastery) after arriving in Hansi in 1586 CE when there were no Hindus left in Hansi under the Islamic rule. He revived the Hinduism in the area. The complex has the sacred banyan tree with a big floating aerial prop-root branch connected to the grounded main taproot stem, which gives an illusion as if the aerial prop-root branch is floating in the air by itself. Pilgrims tie the sacred red-saffron mauli thread around the stem.

==== Barsi gate ====
The historic city of Hansi had five gates of entry – Delhi Gate (East), Hisar Gate (West), Gosain Gate (North-west), Barsi Gate (South) and Umra Gate (South west). The peculiarity of this town is that its altitude increases after entry from any of the gates. Deserts guard this city towards its west (cities like Tosham, Devsar, Khanak).

During the period of Firoz Shan Tuglaq about 1302, a tunnel was constructed connecting the present Hansi to Hisar. The gate of fort has figures of gods, and pictures of gods, goddesses, birds can also be seen on the walls of the fort. The entry gate of the fort was built by George Thomas. This fort was declared a Protected Monument of National Importance in 1937 by the Archeological Survey, the present ASI, and is still in good condition.

==== Indus-Saraswati Valley Civilisation ====
Hansi district has several prominent Indus-Saraswati Valley Civilisation (ISVC) sites on the banks of Drishadvati river (current day paleochannel of Chautang), including Rakhigarhi and at least 23 other ISVC sites within 5 km (at 4 sites), 10 km (at least 10 sites) and 15 km (at least 9 sites) radius of Rakhigarhi. Some of the raw materials were procured from the nodal Rakhigarhi site and finished products were brought back to the nodal Rakhigarhi site for marketing. Within 5 km radius are early Harappan (4600 BCE - 2800 BCE) site of Gamra and mature Harappan (2600 BCE - 1400 BCE) sites of Budana, Haibatpur and Lohari Ragho 3.

== Population ==
In 2025 December, the estimated population of the Hansi district at the time of its formation as a new district was approximately 5,40,994 persons.

== Geography ==
=== Topography ===
The total geographical area of the new Hansi district is approximately 1,34,976 hectares (roughly 1,349.76 square kilometres). The headquarters of Hansi is located at 29.1°N 75.97°E. It has an average elevation of 207 metres (679 ft) People Density is 348 people per km^{2}. Area is 1272.32 km^{2}. Geographically, it is semi-arid with around 46 cm of annual rainfall.

=== Subdivisions ===
The district comprises the following components, all of which lie to the north and northeast of Hansi city, thus creating a development disparity in the southern part of Hansi district.

Sub-division	Number of villages	Tehsil	Sub-tehsil	Development block	Comment
Hansi	64	Hansi, Bass	None	Hansi-I, Bass	
Narnaund	46	Narnaund	Kheri Jalab	Narnaund	

=== New demands ===
There is unfulfilled demand for the following:

- Bass as development block:
  Bass is an existing tehsil, there is demand to also notify it as the development block.

== See also ==
- Administrative divisions of Haryana
- List of districts of Haryana
