= Sothi (village) =

Sotha Sotha
- Village
- Sotha in Haryana, India Sotha (India)
- Coordinates: 29°34′26″N 76°07′38″E
- Country: India
- State: Haryana
- District: Hisar
- Established: 4700 BC
- Founder: Indus Valley civilization

Government
  - Type: Local government
  - Body: Panchayat
- Elevation: 221 m (725 ft)

Population (2011)
  - Total: 1,716

Languages
  - Official: Hindi
- Time zone: UTC+5:30 (IST)
- PIN: 125039
- Vehicle registration: HR

Sotha is a village in Haryana, India.

== Demography ==
In 2011, it had 334 families with a population of 1716.

== Location ==
The Neolithic Sothi (archaeology) site is located near Nohar in Rajasthan, about 120 km west-south-west of Sothi.

The important archaeological site of Rakhigarhi is located about 30 km south.

== Indus Valley Civilisation archaeology ==
Within 5 km to 10 km radius of Rakhigarhi are early, mature and late Harappan sites. To the north-west of Rakhigarhi are Panhari, Gyanpura, Kagsar, and Sulchani. South-west of Rakhigarhi are Sisai, Hisar, Rajpura, Narnaund, Pali and Masudpur.

== Drishadvati River ==
Siswal is located about 70 km to the south-west, in the valley of the prehistoric Drishadvati River. The site of Rakhigarhi is likewise located in the valley of Drishadvati.
