= Kheri Jalab =

- Village
- Kheri Jalab in Haryana, India Kheri Jalab (India)
- Coordinates: 29°20′27″N 76°50′13″E
- Country: India
- State: Haryana
- District: Hisar
- Established: 4700 BC
- Founder: Indus Valley Civilization

Government
  - Type: Local government
  - Body: Panchayat

Languages
  - Official: Hindi
- Time zone: UTC+5:30 (IST)
- Vehicle registration: HR
- Website: haryana.gov.in

Kheri Jalab is a village and an Indus Valley Civilization site, located in Hisar District of the state of Haryana in India.

== Demography ==
The village is home to people of Sheoran Boora, Punia, Kadian, Khatkar, Bhardwaj and some other sub castes of Jat community. The most dominating caste is Jat though some other castes also live in the village. The jat community has a lot of influence over the village.

== Baba Sandokh Nath ==
The whole village are devotees of Baba but there are about 150 to 200 people and children of the village who always attend the evening aarti of Baba Sandhokh Nath, a local guru of the village. The Baba Sandokh Nath is worshipped by many nearby villages and other villages in Haryana. The ladies of the village gather at the local temple and do satsang and pray for the well-being of the village. The people proform the aarti in the evening time.

== Education ==
- Government College, Kheri Chopta

== Indus Valley Civilization Site ==
Kheri Jalab is an early-Harappan Indus Valley Civilization site.

Bolstering the status of Rakhigarhi as the largest Indus Valley Civilization metropolis on the banks of Drishadvati river (current day paleochannel of Chautang), at least 23 other Indus Valley Civilization sites within 5 km (at 4 sites), 10 km (at least 10 sites) and 15 km (at least 9 sites) radius of Rakhigarhi have been discovered till 2001. Some of the raw materials were procured from the nodal Rakhigarhi site and finished products were brought back to the nodal Rakhigarhi site for marketing.

Within 5 km radius are early Harappan (4600 BCE – 2800 BCE) site of Gamra and mature Harappan (2600 BCE – 1400 BCE) sites of Budana, Haibatpur and Lohari Ragho 3.

Within 5 km to 10 km radius, early Harappan sites are Lohari Ragho 1, Lohari Ragho 2 and Kheri Lochab-Kheri Jalab. Mature Harappan small farmstead sites are Milakpur and Gunkali. Small farmstead sites of Kinnar, Nara and Mirchpur have material from both mature and late Harappan period. late Harappan (after 1400 BCE) sites are Sotha and Gandaswala Khera.

Within 5 km to 10 km radius are early, mature and late Harrpan sites. To the north-west of Rakhigarhi are Panhari, Gyanpura, Sotha, Kagsar, Sulchani and south-west of Rakhigarhi are Sisai 1, 2 and 3, Rajpura 2, Pali and Masudpur.

== See also ==
- List of Indus Valley Civilization sites
