= Masudpur =

- Village
- Masudpur in Haryana, India Masudpur (India)
- Coordinates: 29.2283811°N 75.971297°E
- Country: India
- State: Haryana
- District: Hisar
- Established: 4700 BC
- Founder: Indus Valley Civilization Choudhary Masoodi Ram Dalal

Government
  - Type: Local government
  - Body: Panchayat
  - Sarpanch: Mrs. Pooja Dalal

Area 219760
  - Total: 67 km^{2} (26 sq mi)

Population (27000)1
  - Total: 25,670
  - Density: 380/km^{2} (990/sq mi)

Languages
  - Official: Hindi
- Time zone: UTC+5:30 (IST)
- PIN: 125049
- Vehicle registration: HR
- Website: haryana.gov.in

Masudpur is a village and Indus Valley Civilization (4700 BCE to 1400 BCE) archaeological site in the Hansi district in Haryana state in India.

== Indus Valley Civilization Site ==
Masudpur is an early Harappan (4600 BCE - 2800 BCE), mature Harappan (2600 BCE - 1400 BCE) and late Harappan (after 1400 BCE) Indus Valley Civilization site.

Bolstering the status of Rakhigarhi as the largest Indus Valley Civilization metropolis on the banks of Drishadvati river (current day paleochannel of Chautang), at least 23 other Indus Valley Civilization sites within 5 km (at 4 sites), 10 km (at least 10 sites) and 15 km (at least 9 sites) radius of Rakhigarhi have been discovered till 2001. Some of the raw materials were procured from the nodal Rakhigarhi site and finished products were brought back to the nodal Rakhigarhi site for marketing.

Within 5 km radius are early Harappan (4600 BCE - 2800 BCE) site of Gamra and mature Harappan (2600 BCE - 1400 BCE) sites of Budana, Haibatpur and Lohari Ragho 3.

Within 5 km to 10 km radius, early Harappan sites are Lohari Ragho 1, Lohari Ragho 2 and Kheri Lochab-Kheri Jalab. Mature Harappan small farmstead sites are Milakpur and Gunkali. Small farmstead sites of Kinnar, Nara and Mirchpur have material from both mature and late Harappan period. late Harappan (after 1400 BCE) sites are Sotha and Gandaswala Khera.

Within 5 km to 10 km radius are early, mature and late Harrpan sites. To the north-west of Rakhigarhi are Panhari, Gyanpura, Sotha, Kagsar, Sulchani and south-west of Rakhigarhi are Sisai 1, 2 and 3, Rajpura 2, Pali and Masudpur.

== See also ==
- List of Indus Valley Civilization sites
