= Lohari Ragho =

Village in Haryana, India

- Location within India
- 29°16′29″N 76°4′17″E
- Type: Settlement
- Periods: 3200–2600 BC
- Cultures: Indus Valley Civilization
- Associated with: farmer
- Location: Hisar, Haryana, India

Lohari Ragho is a village and Indus Valley Civilization archaeological site, located in Hisar district of the Haryana state in India. It has 3 separate mounds, each 1 to 1.5 km apart within the peripheral suburban zone of Rakhigarhi city cite, where artifacts belonging to Mature Harappan and Sothi-Siswal cultural period (sub-culture of Late Harappan phase) have been confirmed based on filed visits. These mounds, unprotected and under risk of encroachment and threat of obliteration, are yet to be excavated, fenced, protected or conserved.

It is 8 km southwest of its erstwhile urban center of Rakhigarhi, 60 km from its IVC cultural ancestor Siswal, 55 km northeast of district headquarter Hisar, 133 km northwest of national capital New Delhi, and 175 km southwest of state capital Chandigarh.

== Background ==
=== Site location of three mounds ===
Lahori Ragho can be reached from Hansi on Hansi-Jind State Highway SH-12 which runs in northeast direction from Hansi. At 15.2 km on SH-12 from Hansi bypass, where there is Bharat Petroleum's filling station near Majra Payau, another subsidiary road in northwestern direction off SH-12 goes to Lohari Ragho which is another 7 km.

Lohari Ragho has following three separate mounds near Lohari Ragho village, at least 1 km apart, hence each one must be treated as a separate site.

- Lohari Ragho Mound-I: This one is the village in northwest corner of village lal dora near where the unpaved track to Datta village starts.
- Lohari Ragho Mound-II: This one is 950 m west of first one, it lies on the unpaved track which leads to Datta village.
- Lohari Ragho Mound-III: This one is 1.5 km southwest of the second one, it lies in the farms.

=== Lohari Ragho - an ancient outer suburb of Rakhigarhi city ===
Bolstering the status of Rakhigarhi as the largest Indus Valley Civilization metropolis on the banks of Drishadvati river (through whose paleochannel presently flows the Chautang river ), at least 23 other Indus Valley Civilization sites within 5 km (at 4 sites), 10 km (at least 10 sites) and 15 km (at least 9 sites) radius of Rakhigarhi have been discovered up to 2001. Some of the raw materials were procured from the nodal Rakhigarhi site and finished products were brought back to the nodal Rakhigarhi site for marketing.

Within 5 km radius are early Harappan (4600 BCE - 2800 BCE) site of Gamra and mature Harappan (2600 BCE - 1400 BCE) sites of Budana, Haibatpur and Lohari Ragho 3.

Within 5 km to 10 km radius, early Harappan sites are Lohari Ragho 1, Lohari Ragho 2 and Kheri Lochab-Kheri Jalab. Mature Harappan small farmstead sites are Milakpur and Gunkali. Small farmstead sites of Kinnar, Nara and Mirchpur have material from both mature and late Harappan period. late Harappan (after 1400 BCE) sites are Sotha and Gandaswala Khera.

Within 5 km to 10 km radius are early, mature and late Harrpan sites. To the north-west of Rakhigarhi are Panhari, Gyanpura, Sotha, Kagsar, Sulchani and south-west of Rakhigarhi are Sisai 1, 2 and 3, Rajpura 2, Pali and Masudpur.

=== History of excavation ===
There has been no excavation but visits by several archaeologists who have confirmed the presence of two phases of Harappan culture.

These mounds were first reported by Dhoop Sing and Chanderpal Sing of Haryana Department of Archaeology (HAD) (IAR-1980-8:16) as Late Harappan site which was written about in an article by J.P. Joshi (1984) which attributed these mounds to Sothi-Siswal period (a sub-culture of Late Harappan phase). Tejas Garge, Director of Maharashtra Archaeology department, who visited these sites also confirmed presence of additional Mature Harappan phase as well.

== Archaeology of the site ==
=== Three separate mounds ===
Three mounds belonging to the Sothi-Siswal ceramic period were found during excavations in 1980. Archaeological remains were reported first time by Dhoop Singh and Chanderpal Singh from the HAD. A lot of Harappan ceramics have been found on the site such as globular jars, vases, bowls, basins and fast wheel pottery made of red ware.

=== Pottery culture and artifacts ===
Redware pottery culture is typical of IVC, which has been found at this site, some slipped (glazed - either for fusing two pieces together or for decoration and protection) and some unslipped. Slipware is the pottery on which slip has been applied either for glazing or decoration. Slip is liquified clay or clay slurry, with no fixed ratio of water and clay, which is used either for joining leather-hard (semi-hardened) clay body (pieces of pottery) together by slipcasting with mould, glazing or decorating the pottery by painting or dipping the pottery with slip, see glossary of pottery terms.

Tejas Garge, found the following the pottery at the site, these were all shards except a small bowl and a lota where specifically mentioned to be whole artifact:

- Redware, associated with IVC culture
  - Slipped redware
    - small-sized, Lota complete and unbroken: spouted gobular pot
    - medium-large, jar, globular in shape with short out turned beaked rim, medium fabric.
    - jar, gobular shaped, medium fabric
    - medium size, jar, with short externally projecting rim, having medium-to-fine fine fabric.
    - medium sized, jar, out turning beaded rim
    - large, bowl, shallow shaped with inverted/incurred rim and horizontal groove on the neck
    - basin, slip with flaring slides and an out turned rim,
    - jar, medium fabric with wavy incisions
    - jar/vase, medium fabric with wavy incisions
  - Unslipped redware
  - bowl, with convex profile and inside-out rim, medium fabric
  - jar, with narrow mouth and external inside-out rim, fine-to-medium fabric
  - pot, shallow shaped, horizontal line incisions on the shoulder
  - bowl (bottom portion only)
  - small-medium size, pot, out turned beaded rim.
  - medium size, jar with narrow mouth and externally projecting rim.
  - medium size, basin, out turned beaked rim and projecting shoulders.
  - Slipped redware with black color:
    - jar/vase, with prominent flutings on the exterior, "black slipped" red ware fast wheel pottery
    - bowl (complete / unbroken), small size, slip with a horizontal black colour band on neck
- Greyware (Painted Grey Ware culture) is associated with vedic era, which shows this site had overlap of later harappan and early vedic period.
  - Slipped
    - dish (piece of narrow shaft only), having a gray ware stand, fine fabric.

== See also ==
- Indus Valley Civilization
  - List of Indus Valley Civilization sites
    - Bhirrana, 4 phases of IVC with earliest dated to 8th-7th millennium BCE
    - Kalibanga, an IVC town and fort with several phases starting from Early harappan phase
    - Rakhigarhi, one of the largest IVC city with 4 phases of IVC with earliest dated to 8th-7th millennium BCE
    - Kunal, pre harappan cultural ancestor of Rehman Dheri
  - List of inventions and discoveries of the Indus Valley Civilization
    - Hydraulic engineering of the Indus Valley Civilization
    - Sanitation of the Indus Valley Civilisation
  - Periodisation of the Indus Valley Civilisation
  - Pottery in the Indian subcontinent
    - Bara culture, subtype of Late-Harappan Phase
    - Black and red ware, belonging to Neolithic and Pre-Harappan phases
    - Kunal culture, subtype of Pre-Harappan Phase
    - Sothi-Siswal culture, subtype of Pre-Harappan Phase
    - Cemetery H culture (2000-1400 BC), early Indo-Aryan pottery at IVC sites later evolved into Painted Grey Ware culture of Vedic period
  - Rakhigarhi Indus Valley Civilisation Museum
- History of Haryana
  - List of Monuments of National Importance in Haryana
  - List of State Protected Monuments in Haryana
