= Binjor =

Archaeological site in India

- Type: Archaeological site
- Location: Anupgarh tehsil, Sri Ganganagar district, Rajasthan, India
- Part of: Indus Valley civilization

Site notes
- Excavation dates: Ongoing
- Archaeologists: ASI

Binjor - 4MSR (Thed of the local villagers) is an archaeological site in Rajasthan state of India, near the international border between Pakistan and India. It is situated a couple of kilometers from Binjor village, Anupgarh tehsil, Sri Ganganagar district.

== Site location ==
The 4MSR site is 5 km west of Fort of Anupgarh & Binjor village is further 1.5 km west. 4MSR archaeological site is immediate south of Anupgarh-Binjir Road.

== Excavation ==
4MSR, in the Ghaggar river (Ghaggar-Hakra River) valley and excavated by Archaeological Survey of India (ASI), is widely considered as an Early Harappan and Mature Harappan site (Indus Valley civilization). There are no indications that a Late Harappan phase existed. In the Ghaggar river valley, explorations and excavations had been done in several sites. These sites included Kalibangan, 46 GB and Binjor 1, 2, 3 and 4, Rakhigarhi and Baror. "The purpose of the present excavation at 4MSR is to learn about the Early Harappan deposits, relationship with other contemporary sites and to fill the gap between the Late Harappan phase and the Painted Grey Ware culture", Sanjay Manjul, Director, the Institute of Archaeology and head of the excavation at 4MSR, said.

== Finds ==
During 2017 excavation, they have been reported to have found: sevenladdoos, two bull figurines and a handheld wood carving tool.

== See also ==
- List of Indus Valley civilisation sites
- List of inventions and discoveries of the Indus Valley Civilisation
