= Sothi =

Sothi may refer to:

- Sothi (archaeology), an ancient archaeological site
- Sothi (village), a village in India
