= Baror =

Archaeological site in India

Coordinates: 29.169°N 73.3136°E

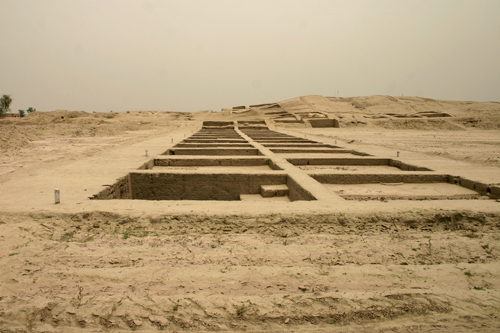
- Archaeological site at Baror

- Location within Rajasthan Baror (India)
- Type: Archaeological site
- Location: Sri Ganganagar district, Rajasthan, India
- Part of: Indus Valley civilization

Site notes
- Height: 11 m (36 ft)
- Area: 200 m × 150 m (660 ft × 490 ft)
- Excavation dates: 2003–2004, 2006–2007
- Archaeologists: Luigi Pio Tessitori, Amlanand Ghosh

Baror is an archeological site in Sri Ganganagar district of Rajasthan, India. It belongs with ancient Indus Valley civilization. Pre Harappan and Harappan pottery has been found after excavation.

== Location ==
It is located in the south part of Sri Ganganagar district of Rajasthan, about 13 km northeast of Anupgarh, near the Pakistan border. It is situated about 100 km southwest of Kalibangan, in the dry bed of Ghaggar river.

The mound of Baror measures about 200 × 150 m and rises to a height of 11 m from its surrounding plain.

== Discovery ==
Baror Prehistoric Site Discovery
Discovered by	Luigi Pio Tessitori, Italian Indologist in 1916–17
Post-Independence Survey	Amlānand Ghosh, Ex. Director General, Archaeological Survey of India

The identity of Baror a pre-historic site was discovered by Luigi Pio Tessitori, an Italian Indologist (1887–1919) in 1916–17. After independence of India, Amlānand Ghosh (Ex. Director General, Archaeological Survey of India) did a detailed survey of this site.

In 2003–04, the Indian archaeological survey started excavation under Sarasvati Heritage Project. A 400×300 square area was selected for excavation.

In 2006–07, houses constructed with tiles, as well roads were discovered.

== Excavation ==
- Archeological Findings
  - Period I – Pre-Harappan
    - Characteristics:
      - Ceramics made on wheel
      - Red-colored without painting
      - Coarse to medium fabric
      - Well-levigated clay
    - Discoveries:
      - Storage jars and miniature pots
      - Few sherds of grey color
      - Remains of Hakra period ware
  - Period II – Harappan
    - Discoveries:
      - Mud brick houses (oriented north–south)
  - Period III – Mature Harappan
    - Discoveries:
      - Remains of mud brick houses (oriented north–south along roads)
  - Other Discoveries
      - Terracotta Items:
      - Circular and triangular cakes
      - Sling balls with pinched decoration
      - Circular beads and spacer
      - Jewelry and Ornaments:
      - Skeleton with ornaments
      - Pitcher with 8000 pearls
      - Miscellaneous Finds:
      - Stones producing red-colored dust
      - 5-meter long, 3-meter clay oven

The archeologists have found pottery of Pre Harappan and Harappan period.

A three-fold cultural sequence was established,

- Period I – Pre-Harappan

Ceramics were made on wheel; they were red coloured and devoid of any painting. The fabric is coarse to medium, and made out of well-levigated clay. Storage jars, and miniature pots were found, as well as a few sherds of grey colour.

The remains of the Hakra period ware were found here at the lowest levels.

- Period II – Harappan
- Period III – Mature Harappan

The remains of mud brick houses were exposed. They were oriented north south along roads

=== Other discoveries ===
The circular and triangular terracotta cakes, sling balls with pinched decoration, circular beads and spacer, terracotta, faience and shell bangles, were also found.

Other discoveries include,

- 1. A skeleton of a human with ornaments has been found.
- 2. Two stones have been found which produce red-coloured dust after rubbing with each other.
- 3. A 5-meter long and 3-meter clay oven also has been discovered.
- 4. A pitcher filled with 8000 pearls has been found here.

== See also ==
- Binjor
- List of Indus Valley Civilization sites

== Bibliography ==
- A. Ghosh (ed.), An Encyclopaedia of Indian Archaeology in 2 Volumes, II (New Delhi 1989)
- S.P. Gupta (ed.), An Archaeological Tour Along the Ghaggar-Hakra River by Sir Aurel Stein (Meerut 1989)
- Urmila Sant, Terracotta Art of Rajasthan (New Delhi 1997)
