= Pendur =

Village in Maharashtra

Coordinates: 16°04′N 73°37′E

- Village
- Interactive map of Pendur
- Founder: Sardar Sawant-Bhosale head of Sawantwadi State
- Named for: Vetal Temple

Pendur village is located in Malvan Tehsil of Sindhudurg district in Maharashtra, India. It is situated 26 km away from sub-district headquarter Malwan and 12 km away from district headquarter Oras.

== History ==
Head person of Sawant-Bhonsle-Patel, (Bhosale-Patel being the titles of Sawant family. The title Bhosale being given as Inam to Lakhman Sawant of Kudal and Patel as administrative title of village chieftain) branch of Sawantwadi State came to village Pendur and took its administration in his hands, he appointed Bara balutedars for village administration. He established Vetal temple as village deity. Sawant(Bhosale-Patel) descendants still reside in the village.

== Vetalgad ==
Vetalgad is situated in pendur village of sindhudurg district. At present, vetal gad is in complete ruins and unfortunately, no remnants are left on the fort. This giant fort was used as a watchtower by maratha troops to keep watch on all tradings. The fort is situated between dhamapur lake and gad river of malvan taluka. Dhamapur is a beautiful lake that resides near vetal gad. All transport of goods as well minerals was done through gad river and from dhamapur lake. Vetal fort served the objective of monitoring all the trendings and ensuring smooth work without any complications. The fort is believed to be built by maratha emperor chatrapati shivaji maharaj. The height of vetal fort is 44 feet.
Vetalgad is known for footprints of 5 pandavas (Yudhishtra, Bheema, Arjuna, Nakula, and Sahadeva). These footprints are at the bottom of the fort. At present, the footprints are not clearly visible since the place is in ruins. Also, there is a throne on the fort. the throne was of which king, is still unknown as there are no enough records in the history. Tourists can see the marks of cannonballs on the walls. These marks let visitors understand a bit about how wars happened and how large were the cannon balls that were used in the battles. There is a well inside the fort which is in ruins too. Well is not much deep and does not have water in it.
