= Kotada Bhadli =

Kotada Bhadli is an archaeological site of the Indus Valley Civilisation.

== Excavation ==
Evidence of dairy production has also been found at the site.

A caravanserai is discovered from the site.

== See also ==
- List of Indus Valley Civilisation sites
