= Pir Shah Jurio =

Coordinates: 24°56′N 66°45′E

Pir Shah Jurio is an Indus Valley civilization archaeological site located in Sindh, Pakistan. It was discovered by Abdur Rauf Khan. The site is situated at the mouth of Hub river in Karachi district and probably served as an important port.

== See also ==
- Indus Valley civilization
- List of Indus Valley Civilization sites
- List of inventions and discoveries of the Indus Valley Civilization
- Hydraulic engineering of the Indus Valley Civilization
