= Vejalka =

- Location within Gujarat Location within India Location within South Asia
- 22°15′00″N 71°52′12″E
- Cultures: Urban Harappan, Post Urban Harappan

Site notes
- Area: 72,500 m^{2} (780,000 sq ft)
- Excavation dates: 2014-15, 2015-16
- Archaeologists: K. Krishnan, Kiran Dimri, MSG University

Vejalka is a village in the Ranpur Taluka of Botad district in Gujarat, India. An Indus Valley Civilisation archeological site was found and excavated near this village in 2014.

== Archeology ==
The site is located 50 km from Lothal which is the major archeological site of the region. There are around 190 Harappan sites in the state, mostly in the Kutch and Saurashtra regions, with a few found in the Lata region as well (like Malwan).

The excavation at the site started in 2014 and extended for two years. The excavation was carried out by students and teachers of the Department of Archaeology and Ancient History, Maharaja Sayajirao University of Baroda. The settlement belonged to the Indus Valley civilization and is dated around 2300 BC to 1600 BC. It was a rural centre which supplied raw material to urban centres.

During the excavation, the archeologists found many artifacts, namely pottery, animal bones, mud walls, beads and stone blades. The beads and stone blades suggested that there was a small scale industry at the site. The mud structures inform us about the domestic architecture of the time. They also found micaceous red ware, a kind of ceramic, in abundance which confirmed that the site belonged to the Indus valley civilization.

The neighbouring villages of Vejalka are Chandarva and Bhimnath, both of which have IVC mounds with the one at Chandarwa being in a state of ruin while the two at Bhimnath are comparatively better preserved.

The 3 mounds at Vejalka are named Neshadho I (10,000 sqm), Neshadho II (37,500 sqm) and Neshadho III (22,500 sqm) respectively.
