= Bass, Hansi =

Bass
- City
- Location in Haryana, India Bass (India)
- Coordinates: 29.1101363°N 76.18351°E
- Country: India
- State: Haryana
- District: Hisar
- Elevation: 208 m (682 ft)

Languages
  - Official: Hindi
- Time zone: UTC+5:30 (IST)
- PIN: 125042
- Vehicle registration: HR
- Website: haryana.gov.in

Bass is a municipal committee town and sub-district (Tehsil) in the Indian state of Haryana. It is classified as a mahagram (a large village), with 4 subsections (Bass Badshahpur, Bass Khurd Bejan, Bass Akbarpur and Bass Azamshahpur). Bass is a historical city, hosting one of India’s two Dhola Khuas (the other is in Delhi). Bass is the second city of the Harayana state.

== History ==
Bass was once a subdivision of Hansi. Its four subsections were converted to a municipal committee in January 2019.

== Geography ==
Bass is situated on Bhiwani–Jind Road NH709A in Narnaund. It is a Vidhan Sabha constituency and subdivision in Hisar district.

It is approximately 25 km from Hansi, 30 km from Jind, 39 km from Bhiwani, 59 km from Hisar and 144 km from Delhi. Bass is at the center of Haryana.

== Administration ==
- Bass as BDPO is very necessary for public. Make BASS a Block Development Office as soon as possible.
- Bass as development block:

Bass is an existing tehsil, there is demand to also notify it as the development block.

== See also ==
- List of cities in Haryana by population
