= Farmana =

- Archeological site
- Location within India
- Coordinates: 29°04′N 76°34′E
- Country: India
- Province: Haryana
- Time zone: UTC+5.30 (Indian Standard Time)

Farmana Khas or Daksh Khera is an archaeological site in Meham block of Rohtak district in northern Indian state of Haryana spread over 18.5 hectares. It is located near the village of Farmana Khas, about 15 kilometers from the Rohtak-Hissar highway and 60 kilometres from Delhi. It is significant particularly for its burial site, with 70 burials, of the Mature Harappan period (2500–2000 BC) and fairly recent addition (excavation started during 2006) to Indus Valley Civilisation sites excavated in India.

== Excavations ==
This site was excavated under the direction of Vasant Shinde of the Deccan College Post-Graduate and Research Institute, Pune. The project was financed by the Research Institute for Humanity and Nature, Kyoto, which also provided technical expertise. The Maharshi Dayanand University, Rohtak and Deccan College Post Graduate and Research Institute, Pune under the aegis of the Archaeological Survey of India (ASI) are the Indian partners of the project.

== Architecture and material culture ==
The site is divided in two areas, one for the living and one for the dead, separated by a distance of 1 km. The finds were made in intensely cultivated, flat land. The habitation site is spread over 18.5 hectare. Excavation has revealed a well-laid-out road with houses on either side.

=== Complex with 26 rooms ===
The site has four complexes and so far one complex has been excavated which has 26 rooms, 3 to 4 kitchens, an equal number of bathrooms and a courtyard in the centre. Terracotta toys, whistle, wheels and seals, copper bangles, a small ornament of gold and large amount of pottery has been retrieved.

=== 70 burials ===
The cemetery at Farmana has revealed 70 burials so far and has been assigned to the Mature Harappan phase (2500–2000 BC), whereas the burial site at Sanauli, in the Baghpat district of Uttar Pradesh, which revealed 116 graves, belongs to a later stage of Harappan culture. Most of the graves are oriented northwest-southeast, though there are some with north-south and northeast-southwest orientations as well. Notable amongst them is a skeleton of a middle-aged woman, which had three shell bangles, two copper bangles, copper earrings, beads and ornaments on the feet, indicating her wealthy status.

== Scientific testing ==
Vasant Shinde announced in March 2009 the intention to conduct scientific tests on skeletal remains, pottery and botanical evidence found at the site, including DNA tests on bones to attempt to establish the origins of the Harappans, and trace element analyses to help understand their diet. However DNA extraction from these skeletons did not succeed as they were contaminated due to long exposure and floods.

Four-thousand-year-old teeth from skeletal remains in Harappa cemetery & Farmana were examined. Human dental enamels were compared and chemical analysis of water, fauna, rocks of those times using ratio of lead & strontium ration was done. Differences in early molars and late morals indicate people living in Indus Valley Cities migrated from countryside to urban areas.

The team also plans to carry out coring tests in lakes around the Farmana site to ascertain climatic conditions prevalent at the time of the Harappan civilization, and investigate whether the decline of the culture followed catastrophic climate change.

== Plant use and dietary practices ==
Study of Starch Grains which are plant microfossils, obtained from storing and cooking ceramic vessels, stone tools as well as dental calculus of burials has shed a light on plant usage in Indus Valley civilization. Use of wheat, barley, millet, gram, garlic whose seeds were found and use of horsegram, eggplant, mango, ginger, turmeric, sedge whose seeds were not found, has been confirmed.

Presence of cooked ginger & turmeric starch grains inside ceramic pots & teeth of skeletons in burial sites make Farmana (Indus Valley) first civilization to use spices for cooking.

== Other findings ==
A recent advance in the study have shown evidence of inter-regional marriage performed by the Harappans for trade purposes as well.

Bangles and beads made out of conch shells from Gujarat were also found at this site.

== See also ==
- List of Indus Valley Civilization sites
