= Khirasara =

Indus Valley Civilisation site

- Location in Gujarat, India
- 23.1103211°N 69.0218369°E
- Type: Settlement
- Cultures: Indus Valley Civilisation
- Location: Gujarat, India

History
- Built: c. 2600 BC
- Abandoned: c. 2200 BC

Site notes
- Excavation dates: 1967-2013

Khirasara is an archaeological site belonging to the Indus Valley Civilization. This site is located in Nakhatrana Taluka of Kutch district in the western Indian state of Gujarat, on the bank of Khari river, 85 kilometres (55 mi) from Bhuj, the district headquarters.

== Excavations ==
During 1976-1977 exploration, an Archaeological Survey of India official discovered a big cubical weight, fragments of pottery, and vessels of red polished ware from the site. In December 2009, a team from the Vadodara division of the Archaeological Survey of India began excavations at this site after the discovery of a fortification wall enclosing a 300 square metres (3,200 sq ft) area.

== Findings ==
Specimens of fine perforated pottery were discovered at the site during excavation. Seals found at this site are exhibited at Kutch Museum.

A "warehouse" found at the site had 14 parallel walls. The warehouse measured 28 metres (92 ft) by 12 metres (39 ft); the walls had an average length of 10.8 metres (35 ft 5 in) and 1.55 metres (5 ft 1 in) breadth. The structure above the walls was made of wood and daub.

Houses have been found signifying residential spaces in the community. Rectangular rooms, connected to each other with furnaces for cooking, and foundation pillars have also been found. The walls of the houses were made with bricks and mud. Footpaths outside the houses were made of mud, pieces of vessels, shells, and small stones.

Bone pots (used to preserve ash and bones after death) and pieces of shells have been recovered from the rooms. Some fine specimens of perforated pottery were uneatthed, which will be matched with the items recovered from other Harappan sites in order to identify and date them. The ones found in the upper layer are likely to belong to a later period while the ones found in the deeper layer will be older. The "subsistence pattern," or the trade and livelihood options of the lost colony, will also become known after further excavations.

It is known now that Khirasara was a major industrial hub of the mature Harappan period and it flourished from around 2600 to 2200 BC.

=== Survey instrument ===
The Archaeological Survey of India has recovered a survey instrument, comparable to a modern prismatic compass, from the site called Gadh-vali vadi.

== Gallery ==
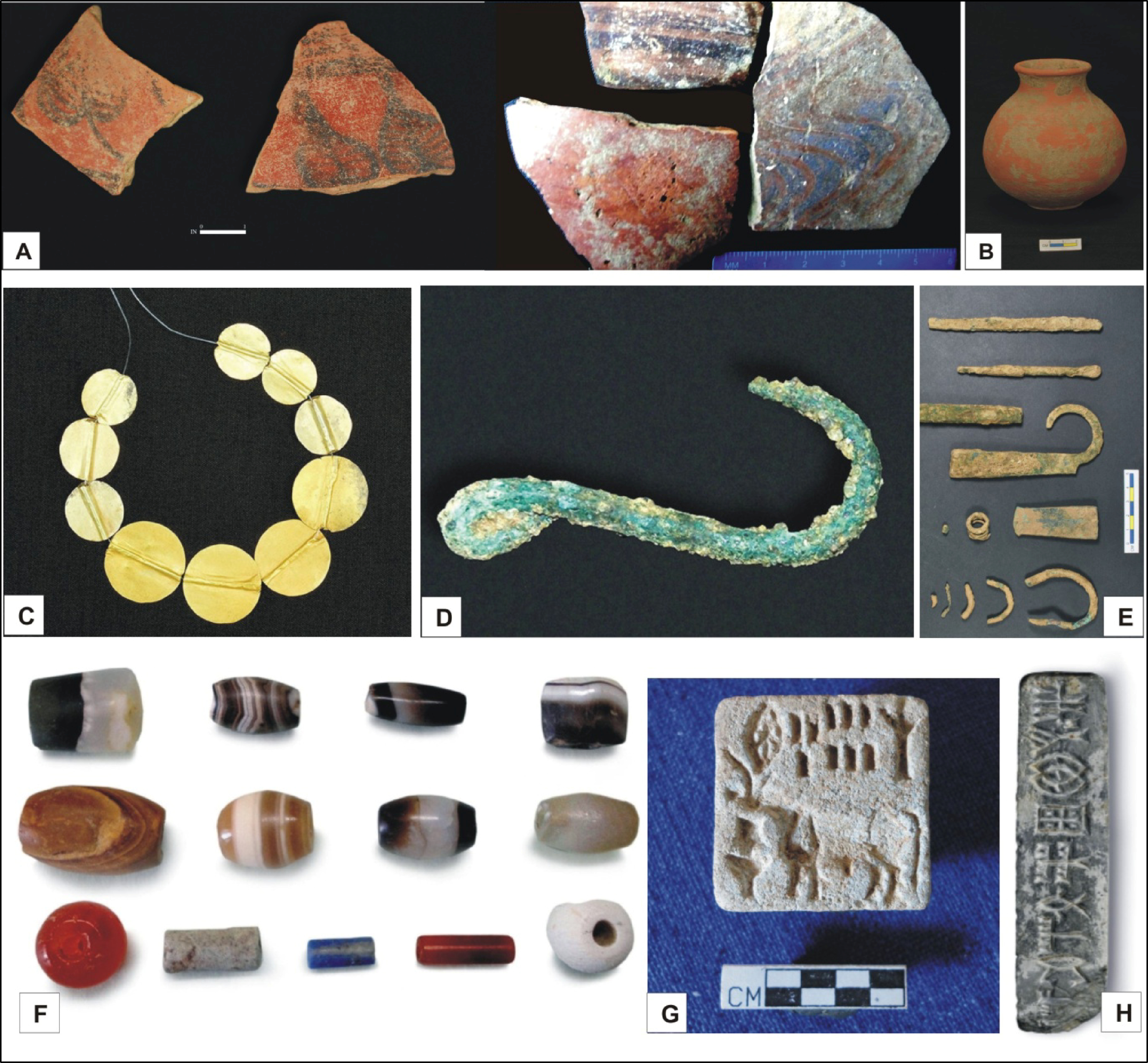
Archaeological artifacts recovered from Khirsara Indus Valley Civilization site

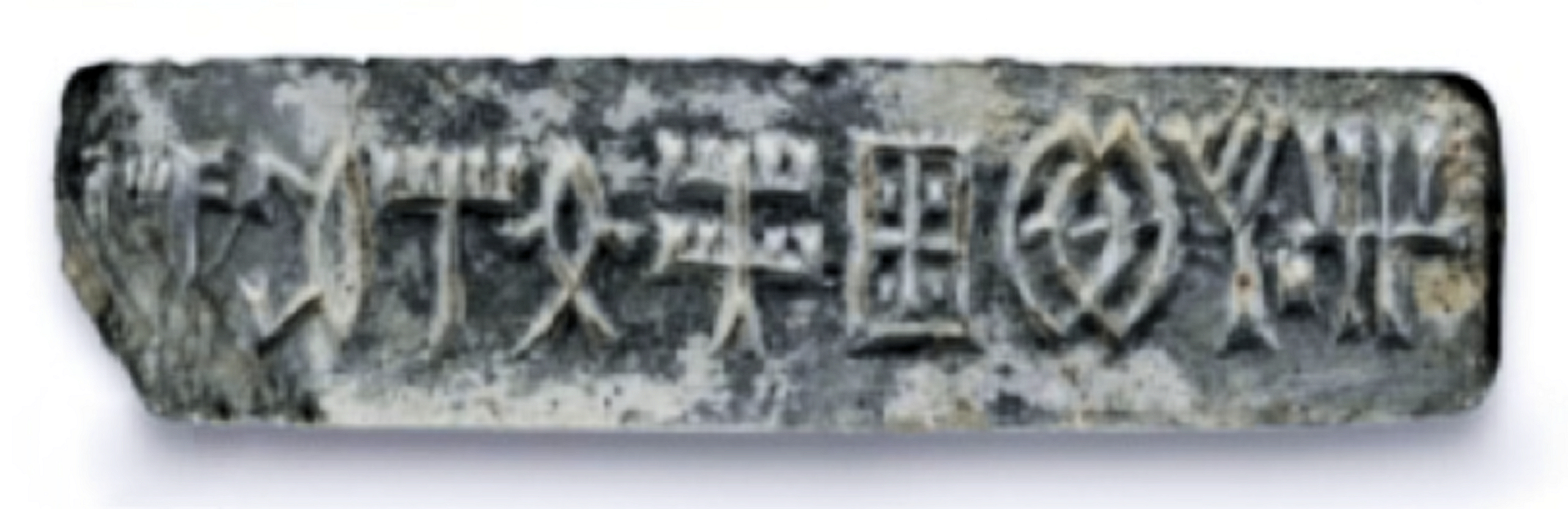
Indus script tablet recovered from Khirasara Indus Valley Civilization site

== See also ==
- Indus Valley Civilization
- List of Indus Valley Civilization sites
- List of inventions and discoveries of the Indus Valley Civilization
- Hydraulic engineering of the Indus Valley Civilization
