= Kanjetar and Kaj =

Kanjotar and Kaj were two closely related settlements of the Indus Valley Civilization. They belong to the civilization's mature period, and are located in the Gir Somnath district of Gujarat, India. Both towns are near the modern city of Kodinar.

== Kanjotar ==
Kanjotar (near muldwarka) is composed of two earthen mounds. One of these mounds is located on the eastern side of the village, next to a modern temple. The other is situated two kilometers away and is used by the modern residents for cultivation. It is speculated by Ratnagar that Kanjotar could be a port town.

== Kaj ==
Kaj is composed to one earthen mound and several houses. It appears that it was inhabited after the Indus period by a people who traded with the Roman Empire. In addition, due to the discovery of a stone anchor, it has been proposed by Gaur that Kaj was a port town.
