= Siswal =

Siswal dhani siswal
- Village
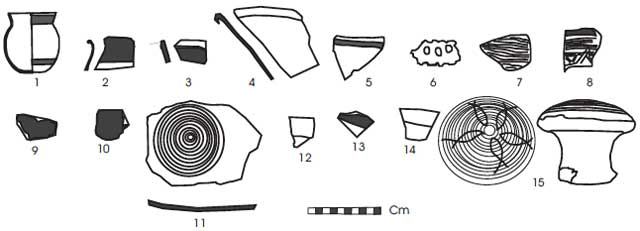
- sherds found at Siswal site

- Kheri Jalab in Haryana, India Siswal (India)
- Coordinates: 29.211210°N 75.496373°E
- Country: India
- State: Haryana
- District: Hisar

Government
  - Type: Local government
  - Body: Panchayat

Languages Bagdi, Haryanvi, Hindi
  - Official: Hindi
- Time zone: UTC+5:30 (IST)
- PIN: 125052
- Vehicle registration: HR-20
- Website: haryana.gov.in

Siswal is a village in Hisar district, Haryana, India. It located 28 km from Hisar city. It is a site of Chalcolithic age. It is a typesite for Siswal culture, dating from around 3800 BC, also known as Sothi–Siswal culture.

== Location ==
The related site of Sothi is located in Rajasthan, about 70 km to the west of Siswal. The large archaeological site of Rakhigarhi is about 70 km to the east. All three ancient settlements are situated in the plain of the ancient Chautang river, that was flowing east to west in this area. Chautang, in its turn, was a tributary of the ancient Ghaggar river, that was also flowing east to west, and parallel to Ghaggar just to the north. Kalibangan is situated close to the confluence of these two rivers.

== Sothi–Siswal culture ==
=== Period and pottery ===
Sothi–Siswal culture: Based on the pottery found here, it is classified as a separate archaeological culture / subculture. This culture is a pre-Harappan culture which was contemporaneous with the Early-Harappan culture, with which it had trade and/or social links and overlap of cultural traits. This site has pottery which exhibits Six fabrics of Kalibanagan. Its type sites are Siswal and Sothi.

Siswal is a site of early Harappan culture, otherwise known as "Pre-Harappan" civilization. The Pre-Harappans were known to live in mud houses with thatched roofs. The culture focused mainly on agriculture as an occupation, domesticating animals such as cows, bulls, pigs and goats. They used wheel made red pottery which was often painted on.

There are broad similarities between Sothi–Siswal and Kot Diji ceramics. Kot Diji culture area is located just to the northwest of the Sothi–Siswal area.

=== Dating ===
According to Tejas Garge, Sothi culture precedes Siswal culture considerably. Sothi culture may be as early as 4600 BCE, while the earliest Siswal A layer is dated 3800-3200 BCE, and is equivalent to the Middle and Upper layers of Sothi.

=== Pottery with 'Six fabrics of Kalibanagan' ===
The Indus Valley Civilization ceramic period of Sothi–Siswal culture was relevant within the civilization. Sites around Siswal were excavated by archaeologist Suraj Bhan in different phases revealing an remarkable cultural sequence. Sothi, also in Haryana, has similar cultural remains.

During a three year period from 1967, Bhan was able to excavate ninety seven sites in the area in order to reach conclusions on the Harappan culture. Upon conducting the small scale excavations, Suraj Bhan was able date a time period ranging from Kalibangan to Late Harappan culture within the region. From here, he brought light to ceramic industry associated with the region known as Siswal, given the same name of the area that these ceramics are found in.

Early Indus Valley Civilization ceramic now as of recent have been classified in order to make a datum line for ceramic studies in this area. Known as the 'six fabrics of Kalibanagan', this term is now known by most scholars who are working within this area of archaeological research.

== Excavation of mound ==
=== Artifacts found ===
The mound located within the village of Siswal is 300m to the north of the village on the left bank of the Chautang Canal as reported by Bhan. The maximum habitation deposit found here was 1.25 m above the natural soil.

The cultural deposit is divided into Siswal A and Siswal B in which A was characterized by the presence of classical Kalibangan I – A to E fabrics. Bhan has also noted a clear trend of evolution in typology from the lowest to the upper levels. A few examples of the sherds found at the site are described in the words of Bhan himself below:

- Miniature pot of red ware with short out-curved rim and thick horizontal black band on neck and lower part of body portion,
- Upper portion of the red ware jar with simple out-turned rim and black slip on the rim and neck portion,
- Fragment of a red ware sherd with horizontal black band on the rim portions and incisions in form of horizontal and criss-cross lines,
- Fragment of central portion of a red ware dish with incisions in form of concentric circle,
- knob (?), shaped like mushroom, 9 cm in height solid, on top portion a circular concentric circle incised with fish motif within.

Upon the excavations at Siswal, Suraj Bhan put forward an idea of the existence of a parallel culture to the Harappans within the region.

=== Ceramic industry at Siswal ===
The ceramic industry of Siswal is divisible into three groups, Siswal A yielded the Kalibangan I Ware, with all the typical fabrics (A to F).

Fabric A is painted with white pigment in addition to the black.

In Siswal B, the late Siswal phase, both the Late Siswal and the Harappan Wares are found. This second phase is characterized by the austerity in shape and design, along with a disappearance of painted white pigment. Better potting technique can also be seen within this second group. It is marked by evolved Kalibangan I shapes bearing only black paintings.

Although all the six fabrics survive in the ware, it lacks in variety in shapes and designs and is generally sturdier and better plotted than the Kalibangan I ware of the earlier phase. In accordance to this, Bhan separated non-Harappan sites on presence of a worn out medium thick red ware treated with red slip and painted with black bands, though he admits similar typology and firing with these and Siswal wear.

Lastly the third and final group is characterized by the appearance of medium fabric made through a fast wheel and treated with a red slip in the case of vessels.

Along with these artifacts found at the Siswal site, others found include terracota bangles with black paint strokes, terracota beads, terracota sling-balls, and terracota triangular cakes.

Due to the abundance of Harrapan archaeological history within the Siswal area, the site continues to be a hot spot within the country of India for tourism as well as archaeological inquiry.

Similar pottery is also found at Lohari Ragho, hence treated as a site belonging to Sothi–Siswal culture.

== See also ==
- Indus Valley Civilization related
  - List of Indus Valley Civilization sites
    - Bhirrana, 4 phases of IVC with earliest dated to 8th-7th millennium BCE
    - Kalibanga, an IVC town and fort with several phases starting from Early harappan phase
    - Rakhigarhi, one of the largest IVC city with 4 phases of IVC with earliest dated to 8th-7th millennium BCE
    - Kunal, cultural ancestor of Rehman Dheri
  - List of inventions and discoveries of the Indus Valley Civilization
    - Hydraulic engineering of the Indus Valley Civilization
    - Sanitation of the Indus Valley Civilization
  - Periodisation of the Indus Valley Civilization
  - Pottery in the Indian subcontinent
    - Bara culture, subtype of Late-Harappan Phase
    - Cemetery H culture (2000-1400 BC), early Indo-Aryan pottery at IVC sites later evolved into Painted Grey Ware culture of Vedic period
    - Black and red ware, belonging to Neolithic and early Harappan phases
  - Rakhigarhi Indus Valley Civilization museum
- History of Haryana
  - List of Monuments of National Importance in Haryana
  - List of State Protected Monuments in Haryana
  - Kotla Nihang Khan
