= Narnaund =

- city
- Location in Haryana, India Narnaund (India)
- Coordinates: 29.22°N 76.15°E
- Country: India
- State: Haryana
- District: Hansi
- Elevation: 208 m (682 ft)

Population (2011)
  - Total: 17,242

Languages
  - Official: Hindi
- Time zone: UTC+5:30 (IST)
- PIN: 125039
- Vehicle registration: HR
- Website: haryana.gov.in

Narnaund is an emerging city on Hansi–Chandigarh highway, a municipal committee and Narnaund (Vidhan Sabha constituency), in Hansi district in the Indian state of Haryana. The city Hansi is approximately 22 km away and another city Jind is 25 km. Narnaund is famous for its 'Main Bazar' as people from adjacent villages used to go there for purchases. The market has now developed to outer regions of the city also. Narnaund has famous Devraj-Mandir where people flock in large numbers on Ekadashi.

== Geography ==
The important villages surrounding Narnaund are Bhaini Amir Pur Moth Rangran, Moth Karnail Sahib, Garhi Azima, Majra, Madha, Lohari Ragho, Rajthal, Khanda Kheri, Baas and Petwar.

== Politics ==
For many years, this constituency has been seen as an anti-Congress seat.

In 2019 Assembly Elections, Ramkumar Gautam of JJP won the 2014 Haryana Legislative Assembly Elections by defeating Captan Abhimanyu of BJP over 12000+ votes.

In 2014 Assembly Elections, cabinet minister Captain Abhimanyu of BJP won the 2019 Haryana Legislative Assembly election over Raj Singh Mor of INLD and independent candidate Ram Kumar Gautam.

Narnaund falls under Hisar Lok Sabha constituency. In 2014 Lok Sabha elections, Dushyant Chautala became MP for this seat.

== Demographics ==
As of 2001 India census, Narnaund had a population of 15,114. Males constitute 54% of the population and females 46%. Narnaund has an average literacy rate of 57%, lower than the national average of 59.5%: male literacy is 67%, and female literacy is 44%. In Narnaund, 15% of the population is under six years of age. According to 2011 census, population of Narnaund had increased 1.32%. the population counted 17,242 in 2011.

== Economy ==
Primarily, Narnaund is an agriculture-based region where more than 80% people earn their livelihood via agriculture or related professions. This tehsil has a large anaaj mandi, and an ever-developing market along the highway.

Captain Abhimanyu, Finance Minister of Haryana who is MLA from Narnaund Vidhansabha constituency, announced setting up of a Murrah buffalo Research and Skill Development in Narnaund in 2018-19 budget to train women, unemployed youth and farmers for self-employment.

== Education ==
- Government College, Narnaund
- Indus College of Nursing, Khanda Kheri
- Mata Jiyo Devi College of Education, Khanda Kheri

== Notable people ==
- Captain Abhimanyu, Former Finance Minister of Government of Haryana is an MLA from Narnaund
- Surya Kant, Supreme court Judge belongs to Petwar (Narnaund) village.
