= Malwan =

Malwan, Gujarat માલવણ, ગુજરાત
- Archaeological site
- Location within India
- Coordinates: 21°41′N 72°42′E
- Country: India
- State: Gujarat
- District: Valsad
- Time zone: UTC+5.30 (Indian Standard Time)

Malwan (also spelled Malvan) is a small Indus Valley Civilisation site, located at Valsad District, Gujarat, India. This site is, sometimes, considered as one of the southernmost limits of Indus Valley Civilisation, the other one being Daimabad which is located further south.

== Period ==
Findings at the site have been linked to two distinct periods:

Period I – Late Harappan and Post Harappan

Period II – Historical pits and temporary occupation.

== Excavation ==
F.R.Allchin and J.P.Joshi (of Archaeological Survey of India) discovered this site during 1967. However, by that time, the site was damaged and major portion of the ancient habitation was already lost.

Excavation was undertaken during 1967–68 by ASI and later during 1970 by J.P.Joshi of ASI. Joshi's colleagues and Cyrus Guzder of the University of Cambridge were involved.

== Findings ==
A number of copper and bronze objects were found, among them a bangle and small rod. Animal findings include sheep, goat, cattle, dog, horse, hog, pig, barasingha, and fish.

Other discoveries include Terracotta humped bulls, circular or bun shaped terracotta cakes, and carnelian beads Bowls and various sized jars were found, featuring decorations that included plain bands and hanging interlaced loops on the body and neck of the vessel.

== See also ==
- Indus Valley civilization
- List of Indus Valley Civilization sites
- List of inventions and discoveries of the Indus Valley Civilization
- Hydraulic engineering of the Indus Valley Civilization
