= Kalibangan =

Town on the banks of the Ghaggar River in India

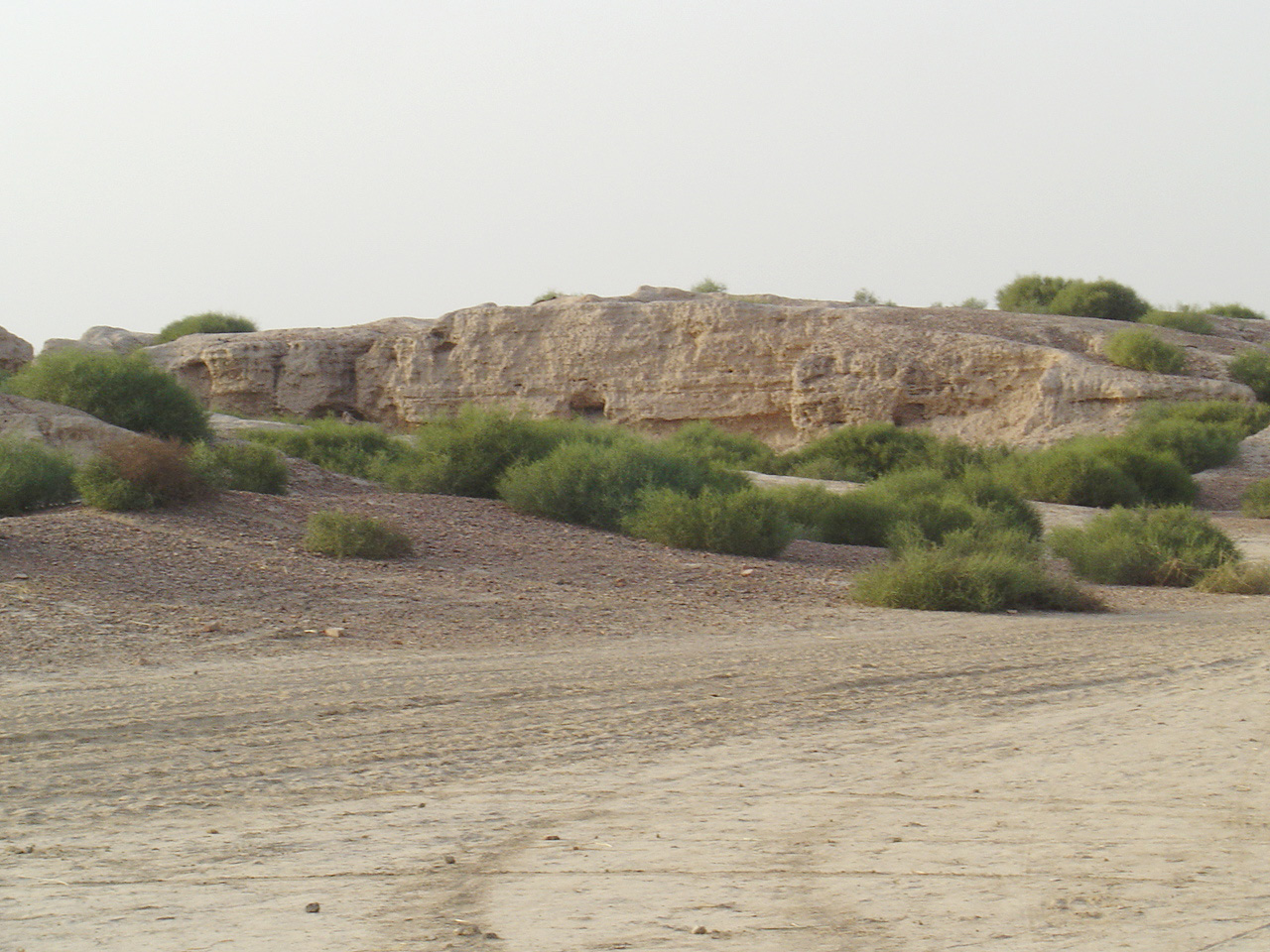
- The western mound of Kalibangan, known as the Citadel

- Location within Rajasthan Location within India
- 29°28′27″N 74°7′49″E
- Type: Settlement
- Periods: Harappan 1 to Harappan 3C
- Cultures: Indus Valley civilization
- Location: Rajasthan, India

History
- Built: c. 2900 BC

Kalibangan is a town located on the left or southern banks of the Ghaggar (Ghaggar-Hakra River) in Tehsil Pilibangān, between Suratgarh and Hanumangarh in Hanumangarh District, Rajasthan, India 205 km from Bikaner. It is also identified as being established in the triangle of land at the confluence of Drishadvati and Sarasvati Rivers. The prehistoric and pre-Mauryan character of the Indus Valley Civilization was first identified at this site by Luigi Tessitori. Kalibangan's excavation report was published in its entirety in 2003 by the Archaeological Survey of India, 34 years after the completion of excavations. The report concluded that Kalibangan was a major provincial capital of the Indus Valley Civilization. Kalibangan is distinguished by its unique fire altars and "world's earliest attested ploughed field". It is around 2900 BC that the region of Kalibangan developed into what can be considered a planned city.

Kalibangan was first excavated under the Directorship of Braj Lal (ASI) between 1960-1961 to 1969-1970. Other excavation team members were Bal Thapar, M.D. Khare, K.M. Shrivastava, J.P. Joshi. and S.P. Jain.

== Indus Valley Civilization ==
The Kalibangan pre-historic site was discovered by Luigi Tessitori, an Italian Indologist. He was doing some research in ancient Indian texts and was surprised by the character of ruins in that area. He sought help from John Marshall of the Archaeological Survey of India. At that time the ASI was conducting excavations at Harappa, but they were unaware of the significance of the ruins. In fact, Tessitori was the first person to recognize that the ruins were 'Prehistoric' and pre-Mauryan. Luigi Tessitori also pointed out the nature of the culture, but at that time it was not possible to guess that the ruins of Kalibangan lay within the Indus Valley Civilisation. He died five years before the Harappan culture was formally recognized.

After India's independence, both the major Harappan cities together with the Indus became a part of Pakistan and India, archaeologists were compelled to intensify the search for Harappan sites in India. Amlānand Ghosh (Ex. Director General, Archaeological Survey of India, or ASI) was the first person to recognise this site as Harappan and marked it out for excavations. Under the leadership of Braj Lal (then Director General, ASI), Bal Thapar, M. D. Khare, K. M. Shrivastava, and S. P. Jain carried out excavations for 9 years (1960–1969) in 9 successive excavation sessions. Two ancient mounds were excavated, spread over half a kilometre (an area of a quarter square kilometre). On the western side is the smaller mound (KLB1), 9 meters high and known as the citadel. The Eastern mound, which is higher (12 meters) and bigger, is known as the lower city (KLB2).

The excavation unexpectedly brought to light a twofold sequence of cultures, of which the upper one (Kalibangan I) belongs to the Harappan, showing the characteristic grid layout of a metropolis and the lower one (Kalibangan II) was formerly called pre-Harappan but is now called "Early Harappan or antecedent Harappan". Other nearby sites belonging to IVC include Balu, Kunal, and Banawali.

== Early Harappan Phase ==
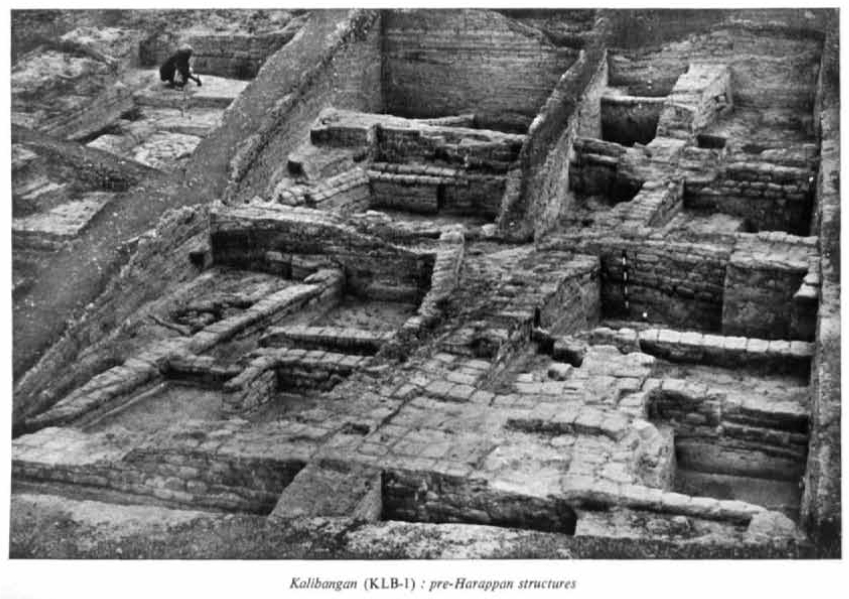
Kalibangan pre-Harappan structures

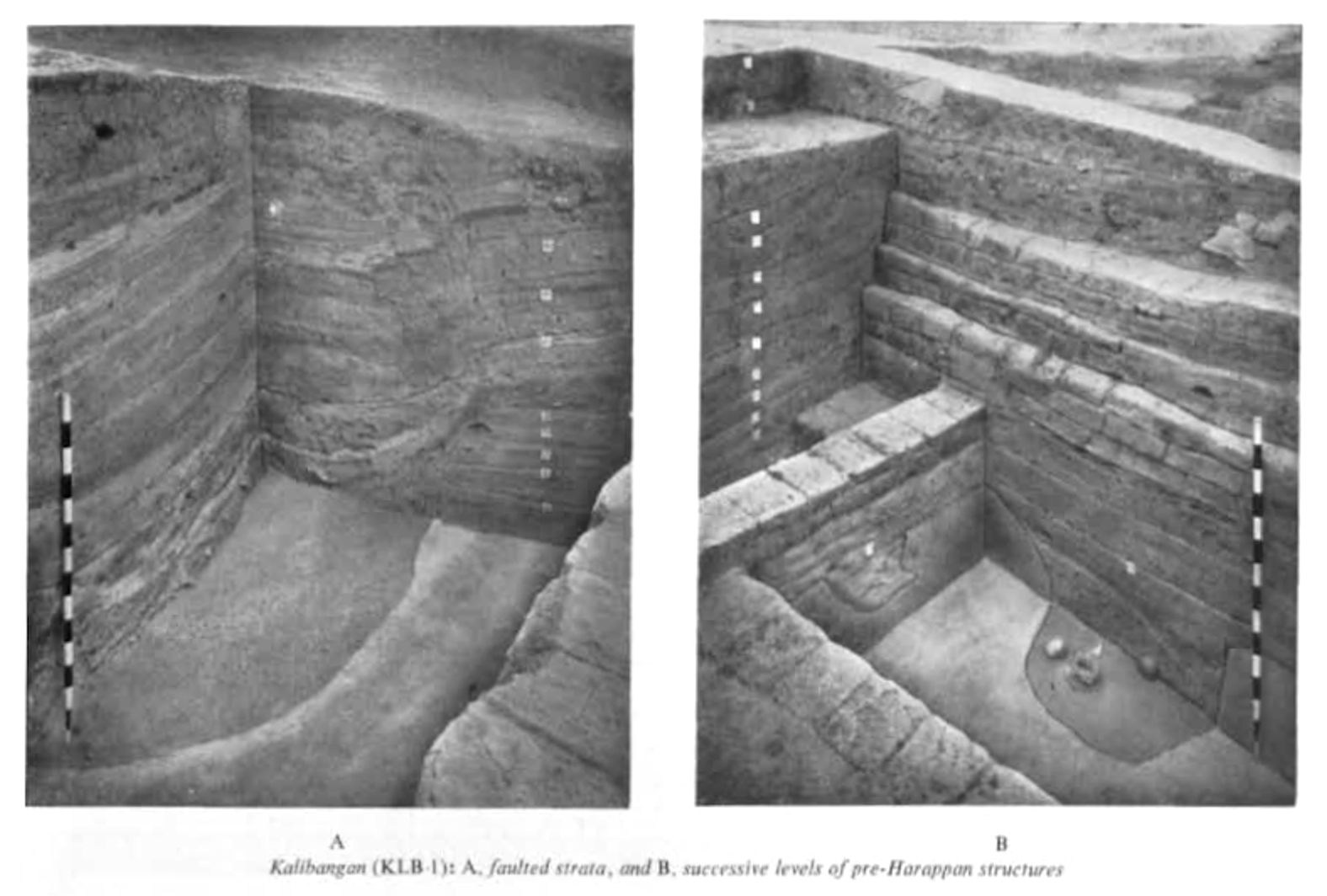
Kalibangan pre-Harappan structural strata

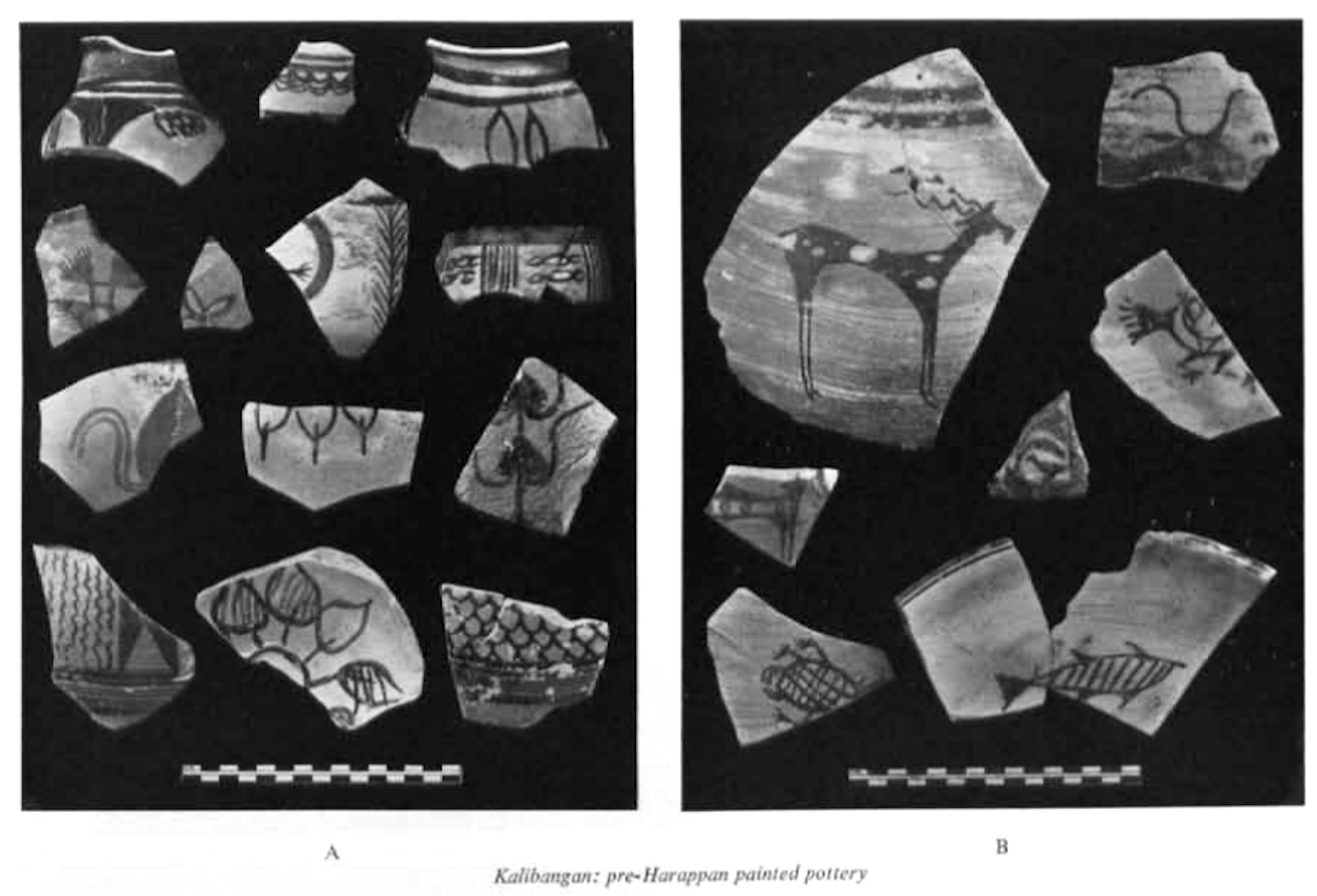
Kalibangan pre-Harappan painted pottery

This Early Harappan phase (also called Proto-Harappan Phase) at Kalibangan belongs to the Sothi-Siswal culture (see also Sothi site).

Traces of pre-Harappan culture have been found only at the lower levels of the western mound. According to archaeological evidence, the Indus Valley culture existed at the site from the proto-Harappan age (3500 BC – 2500 BC) to the Harappan age (2500 BC – 1750 BC). This earlier phase is labelled Kalibangan-I (KLB-I) or Period-I. Similarity of pottery relates Kalibangan-I with the Sothi-Siswal culture because a lot of this pottery was later discovered at Sothi village in North Western India.

There are also links in Kalibangan to the Kot Diji culture (related to Sothi-Siswal).

=== Fort and houses ===
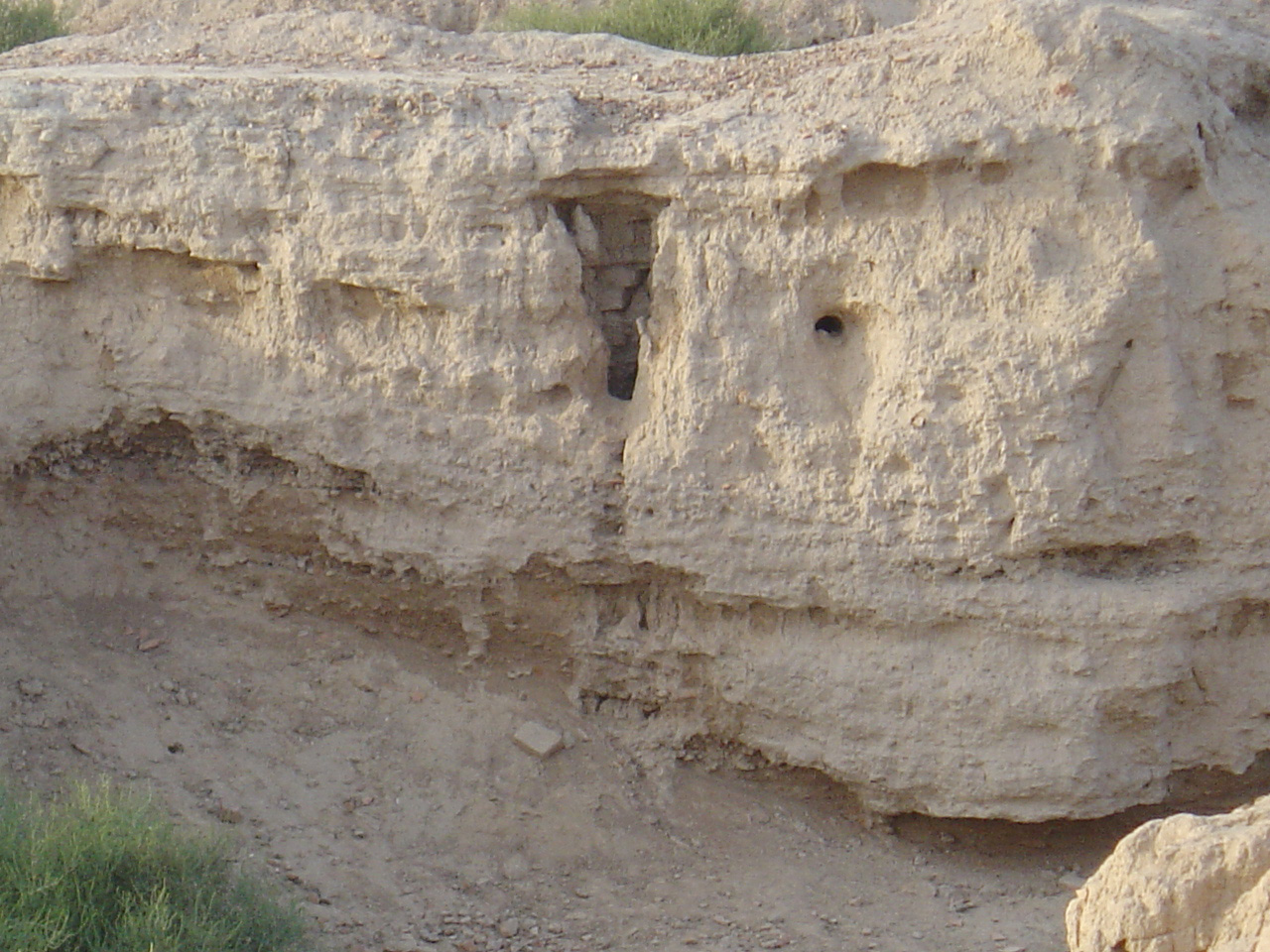
Ruins of Kalibanga. Brick wall can be seen in the hole in the center.

In this phase, the settlement was fortified, using dried mud bricks, from the beginning of occupation. This fort had been built twice in different periods. Earlier, fort wall had a thickness of 1.9 meters, which was raised to 3.7–4.1 meters during reconstruction in this phase. Brick size was 20 × 20 × 10 cm in both construction-phases. The citadel mound (smaller mound) is a parallelogram about 130 meters on the east–west axis and 260 meters on the north–south. Town planning was like that of Mohenjodaro or Harappa. The direction of houses and brick sizes was markedly different from that used in the Harappan phase (KLB-II).

Within the walled area, the houses were also built of mud bricks of the same size as used in the fort wall; the use of burnt bricks is attested by a drain within the houses, remains of ovens and cylindrical pits, lined with lime plaster. Some burnt wedge shaped bricks have also been found.

=== Earliest ploughed field ===
Braj Lal, former DG of ASI writes, "Kalibangan in Rajasthan has given the evidence of the earliest (c. 2800 BC) ploughed agricultural field ever revealed through an excavation.". It has been found south east of the pre-Harappan settlement, outside the fort. "Kalibangan excavations in present western Rajasthan shows a ploughed field, the first site of this nature in the world. It shows a grid pattern of furrows, placed about 30 cm apart running east-west and other spaced about 190 cm apart running north-south, a pattern remarkably similar to the one practiced even now.". Even today, similar ploughing is used for two simultaneous crops in this region, esp. of mustard and gram. In order to preserve it, this excavated ploughed field area was refilled after excavation and the area was marked by concrete pillar posts.

=== 'Six fabrics of Kalibangan' pottery ===
Early Harappan Phase pottery found at Kalibangan has been classified to make a datum line for ceramic studies in the Indian subcontinent, which is known as the six fabrics of Kalibanagan. Fabrics A, B, and D are grouped as redware, Fabric C pottery is violet and black and classified as subtype of black and red ware.

Six fabrics of Kalibanagan refer to the distinguishing mark on pottery of this early Harappan phase characterized by six fabrics labelled A, B, C, D, E and F, which were later identified also at nearby site of Sothi belonging to Sothi-Siswal culture which is a subtype of Early Harappan Phase.

Six fabrics of Kalibanagan ae as follows:

- Fabrics A, B, and D can be clubbed together. They are red painted. Fabric A is carelessly potted in spite of use of potter's wheel. It contains designs in light-black, often decorated with white lines. Lines, semicircles, grids, insects, flowers, leaves, trees and squares were favourite motifs. Fabric B shows marked improvement in finishing, but the lower half was deliberately roughened. Flowers, animals were painted in black on red background. Fabric D contained designs of slanted lines or semicircles in some, while most pots were plain. But Fabric-C pottery was thicker and stronger.
- Fabric C was distinguished by violet tinge and fine polish, with designs in black; it is the best proto-Harappan pottery in finishing. Fabric E was light colored and Fabric F was grey.

=== Other finds ===
Among the other finds of this Period are: small blades of chalcedony and agate, sometimes serrated or backed; beads of steatite, shell, carnelian, terracotta and copper; bangles of copper, shell and terracotta; terracotta objects like a toy-cart, wheel and a broken bull; quem with mullers, a bone point, and copper celts, including an unusual axe, etc. Toy carts suggest carts were used for transportation in early phase of Kalibangan.

=== Earliest earthquakes and end of Phase-I ===
B. B. Lal, former DG of ASI writes,"Kalibangan in Rajasthan ... has also shown that there occurred an earthquake around 2600 BC, which brought to an end the Early Indus settlement at the site.". This is perhaps the earliest archaeologically recorded earthquake. At least three pre-historic earthquakes affecting the Indus Valley Civilization at Dholavira in Khadir have been identified during 2900–1800 BC.

KLB-I phase has left 1.6 meters of continuous deposits during five distinct structural strata, the last of which was destroyed perhaps by an earthquake and the site was abandoned around 2600 BC, soon to be settled again by Harappans.

== Harappan Phase ==
=== Fire altars ===
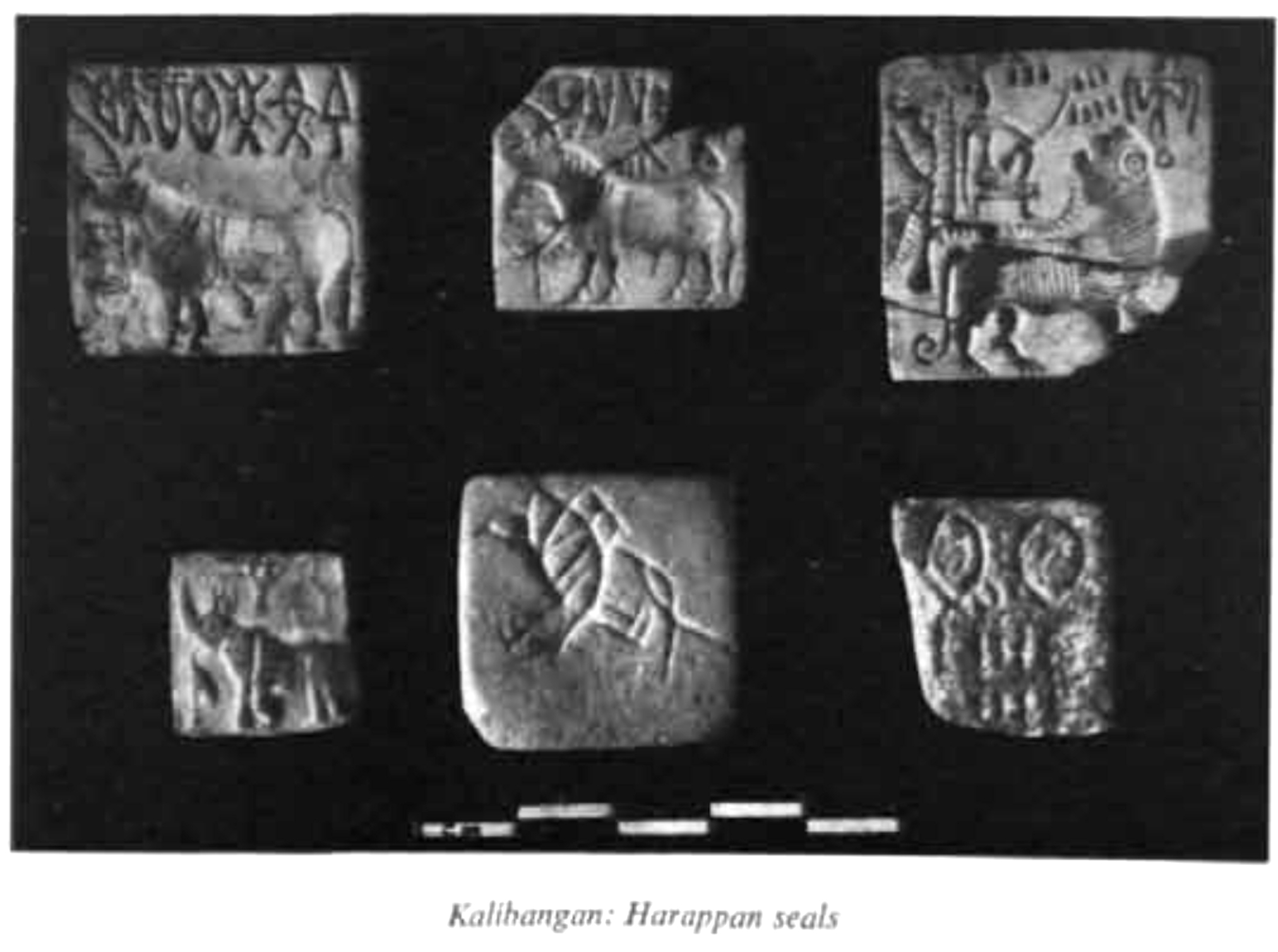
Kalibangan Harappan seals

At Kalibangan, fire altars have been discovered, similar to those found at Lothal which Shikaripura Rao thinks could have served no other purpose than a ritualistic one. These altars suggest fire worship. It is the only Indus Valley Civilization site where there is no evidence to suggest the worship of the mother goddess.

Within the fortified citadel complex, the southern half contained many (five or six) raised platforms of mud bricks, mutually separated by corridors. Stairs were attached to these platforms. Vandalism of these platforms by brick robbers makes it difficult to reconstruct the original shape of structures above them but unmistakable remnants of oval fire-pits of burnt bricks for have been found, with a sacrificial post (cylindrical or with rectangular cross-section, sometimes bricks were laid upon each other to construct such a post) in the middle of each pit and sacrificial terracotta cakes in all these fire-pits. Houses in the lower town also contain similar altars. Burnt charcoals have been found in these fire-pits. The structure of these fire-altars is reminiscent of altars, but the analogy may be coincidental, and these altars are perhaps intended for some specific (perhaps religious) purpose by the community as a whole. In some fire-altars remnants of animals have been found, which suggest a possibility of animal-sacrifice.

The official website of ASI reports : "Besides the above two principle [sic] parts of the metropolis there was also a third one-a moderate structure situated upwards of 80 m e. of the lower town containing four to five fire altars. This lonely structure may perhaps have been used for ritual purposes." Thus, fire-altars have been found in three groups: public altars in the citadel, household altars in lower town, and public altars in a third separate group. A short distance from fire altars, a well and remnants of a bathing place were found, suggesting ceremonial bath was a part of rituals.

=== Lower town ===
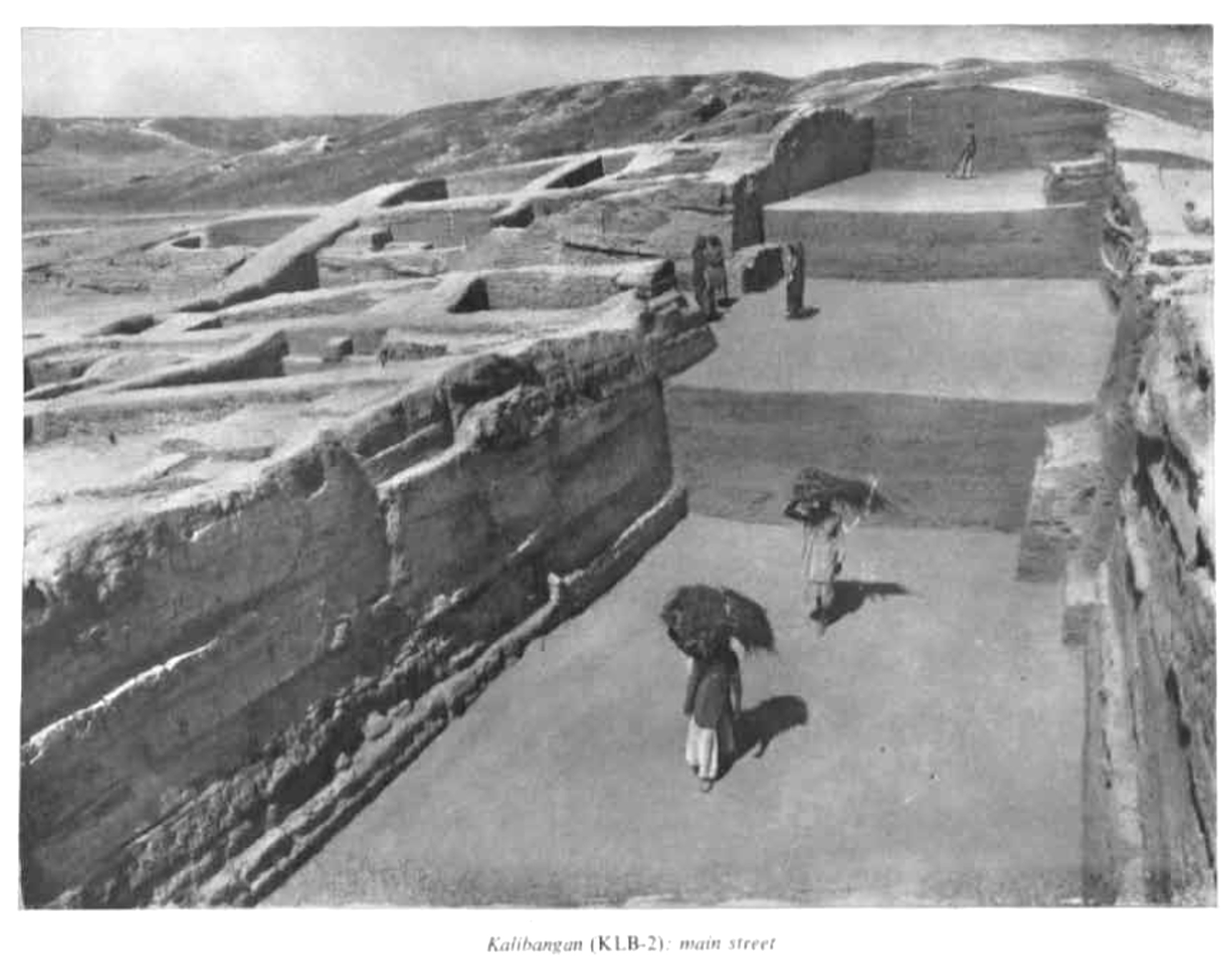
Kalibangan 2, Main street

The lower town was also a fortified parallelogram, although only traces are now left. The fort was made of mud bricks (40 × 20 × 10 cm) and three or four structural phases have been recognized. It had gates in north and west.

B. B. Lal wrote:

"Well-regulated streets (were) oriented almost invariably along with the cardinal directions, thus forming a grid-iron pattern. (At Kalibangan) even the widths of these streets were in a set ratio, i.e. if the narrowest lane was one unit in width, the other streets were twice, thrice and so on. (...) Such a town-planning was unknown in contemporary West Asia.".

The lower town was 239 meters east to west, but north–south extent cannot be determined. 8 main roads have been recognized, 5 north–south and 3 east–west. Few more east–west roads are expected to be buried within the unexcavated remains. Second east–west road ran in a curved outline to meet the first at the north-eastern end (towards the river), where a gateway was provided. This road was an anomaly in the grid-pattern of straight roads. There were many lanes connected to specific housing complexes. Roads and lanes had widths in accurately determined proportions, like in other Harappan cities, ranging from 7.2 meters for main roads to 1.8 meters for narrow lanes. Fender posts were installed at street corners to prevent accidents. In second structural level, roads were laid with mud tiles. Drains from houses emptied into pits (soakage jars) beneath the roads. Some central authority must be there to plan and regulate all this.

=== Housing ===
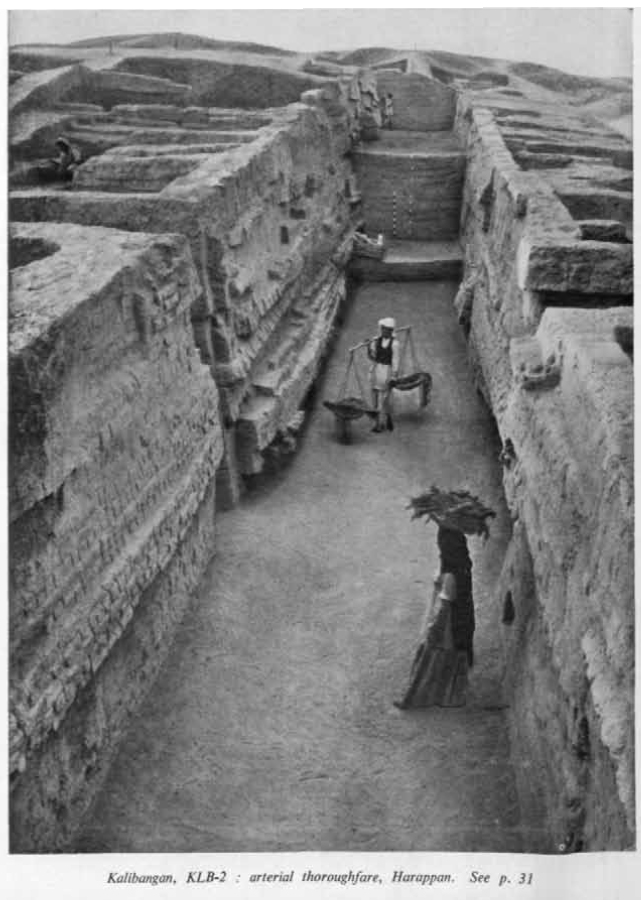
Kalibangan arterial thoroughfare, Harappan

The city was fortified. Like town planning, housing also followed the common pattern of other Harappan cities. Due to grid-pattern of town planning like a chess board, all houses opened out to at least two or three roads or lanes. Each house had a courtyard and 6–7 rooms on three sides, with a well in some houses. One house had stairs for going to the roof. Houses were built of 10 X 20 X 30 cm adobe bricks (same as those used in second structural phase of fort wall). Burnt bricks were used in drains, wells, bathing platforms and door-sills, besides fire-altar. Floors of rooms were built of thrashed fine mud, sometimes laid with mud bricks or terracotta cakes. One house had floors built of burnt tiles decorated with geometrical designs. Kalibangan 1953 A. Ghosh Situated in Rajasthan on the Bank of Ghaggar 1. Shows both Pre Harappan and Harappan phase 2. Evidence of furrowed land 3. Evidence of camel bones 4. Many houses had their own well 5. Kalibangan stand for black bangles 6. Evidence of wooden furrow

=== Terracota ===
Some early Kalibangan pottery has a close resemblance to the pottery of the Hakra ware in Cholistan, to other Early Harappan pottery from the Indus Valley Civilization and the pottery of the Integration Era. Functionally, pottery can be classified into household pots, religious and burial purposes. Structurally, we have classes like plain and decorated wares. Some pots had Harappan inscriptions (undeciphered) on them.

The best terracotta figure from Kalibangan is that a charging bull which is considered to signify the "realistic and powerful folk art of Harappan Age". The city is known for the numerous terracotta bangles found here.

=== Seals ===
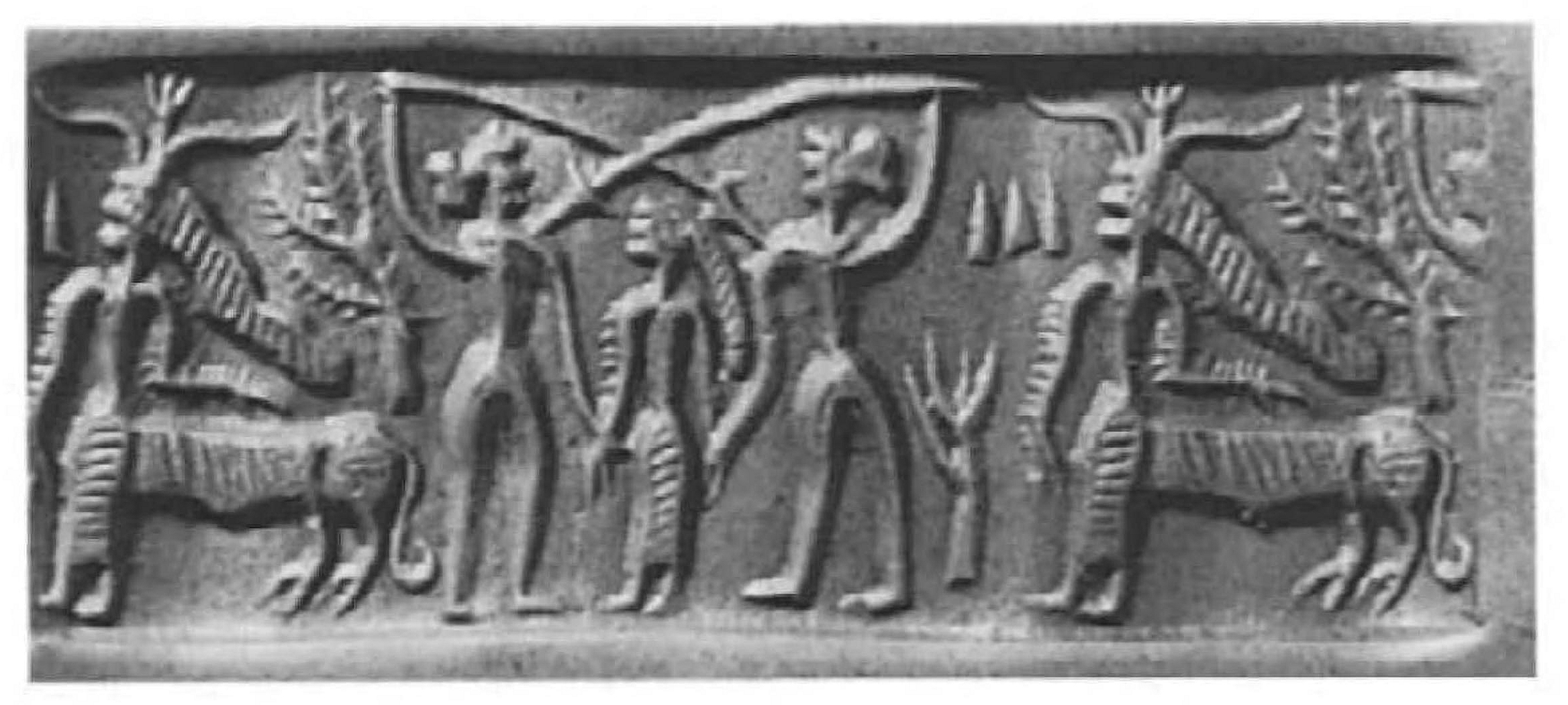
Kalibangan cylinder seal

A number of seals have been found dating to this phase. Most noteworthy is a cylindrical seal, depicting a female figure between two male figures, fighting or threatening with spears. There is also a mixed person bull observing. They are of rectangular shape.

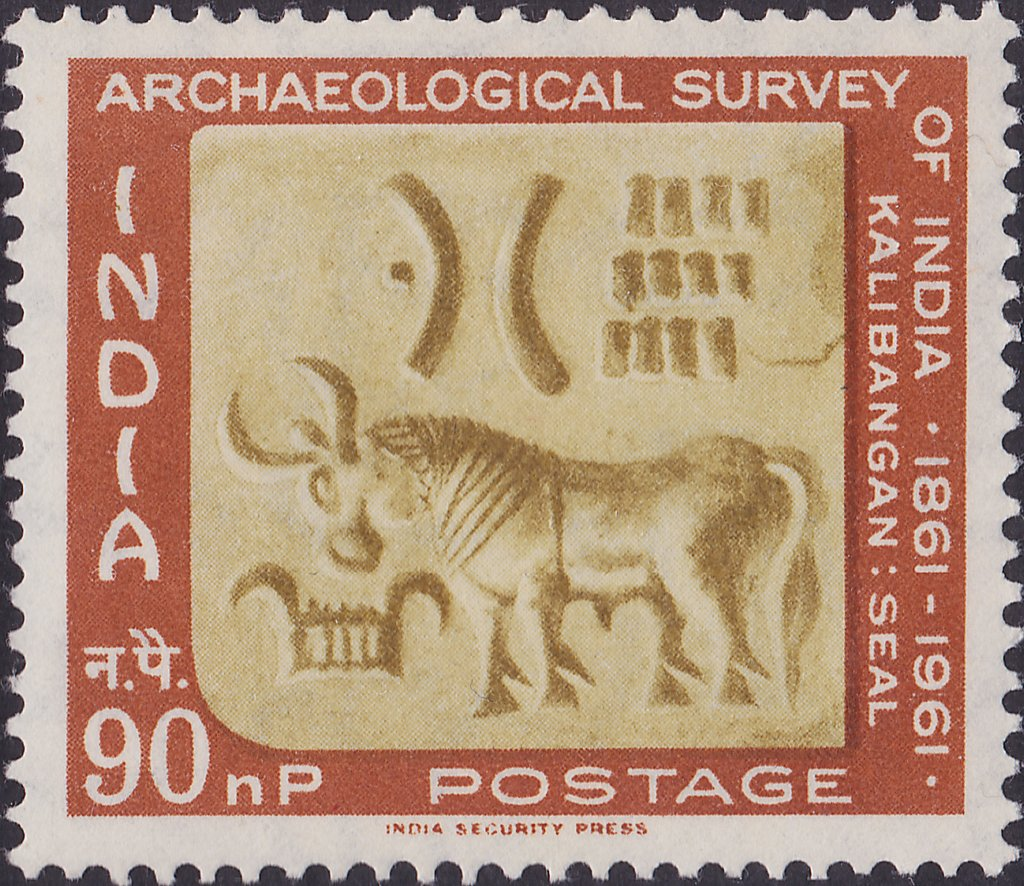
1961 postal stamp

=== Other finds ===
A cylindrical graduated measuring rod and a clay ball with human figures are other notable finds. Peas and chickpeas were also found.

=== Burial systems ===
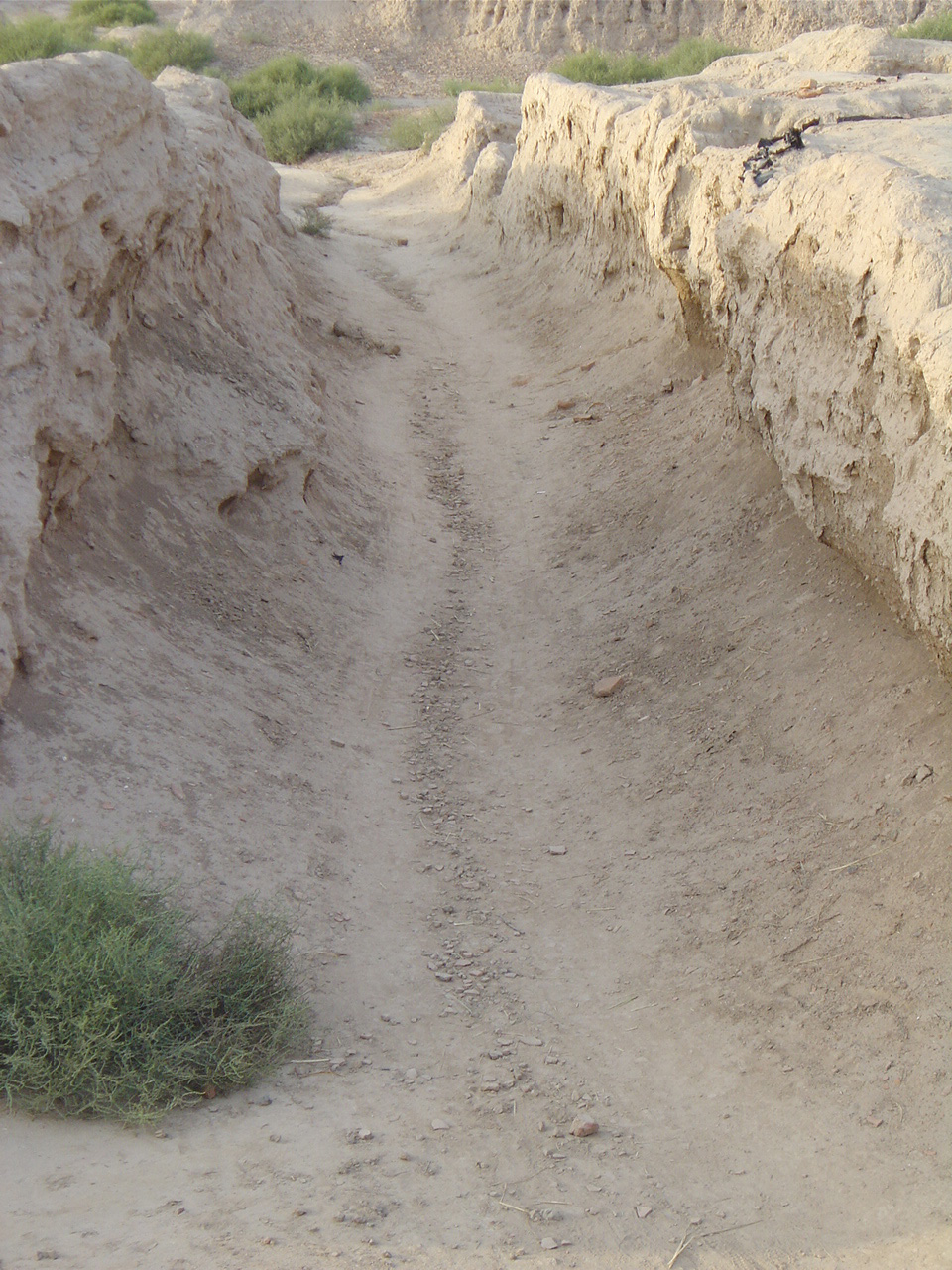
The passage to the graveyard

Three systems of burial have been attested in the burial ground ~300 yards south-west of the citadel, where ~34 graves have been found :

1. Burial in rectangular or oval pit, with corpse laid down straight (extended), head northwards amidst pottery. In one pit a copper mirror was found among these objects. Pits were mud filled after burying. One grave was enclosed with a mud brick wall plastered from inside. One child had six holes in the skull. Many paleopathological evidences have been gathered from these graves.
2. Burial in pot (urn) in a circular pit, with no corpse. Four to 29 pots and utensils were placed around the main pot (urn). In some graves beads, shell, etc have been found.
3. Rectangular or oval grave-pit, containing only pottery and other funerary objects. Like the first type, the length of this type of graves was also along north–south. The latter two methods were not associated with any skeletal remains and may be related to symbolic burial, not found at other Harappan towns. The third type of graves contained objects as in the second type, like beads, shells, etc., but no corpse. Some pits were not filled ASI official website :.

=== End of civilization ===
Robert Raikes has argued that Kalibangan was abandoned because the river dried up. Prof. B. B. Lal (retd. Director General of Archaeological Survey of India) supports this view by asserting: "Radiocarbon dates indicate that the Mature Harappan settlement at Kalibangan had to be abandoned sometime around 2650 BC. And, as the hydrological evidence indicates, this abandonment took place on account of the drying up of the Sarasvati (Ghaggar). This latter part is duly established by the work of Raikes, an Italian hydrologist, and of his Indian collaborators".

== Modern Kalibangan ==
Kalibangan name translates to "black bangles" ("Kāļā", in the local Bagri language means black and "bangan" means bangles). A few miles downstream is the railway station and township named Pilibangā, which means Yellow Bangles.

ASI set up an Archaeological Museum at Kālibangan in 1983 to store the excavated materials here during 1961–69. In one gallery, Pre-Harappan finds are displayed, while Harappan finds are displayed in the other two galleries.

== Gallery ==
Exposed Kalibangan ruins during the excavation of 1952–1953 conducted by Archaeological Survey of India.

== See also ==
- Indus Valley Civilization
- List of Indus Valley Civilization sites
  - Bhirrana, 4 phases of IVC with earliest dated to 8th-7th millennium BC
  - Kalibanga, an IVC town and fort with several phases starting from Early harappan phase
  - Rakhigarhi, one of the largest IVC city with 4 phases of IVC with earliest dated to 8th-7th millennium BC
  - Kunal, cultural ancestor of Rehman Dheri
- List of inventions and discoveries of the Indus Valley Civilization
  - Hydraulic engineering of the Indus Valley Civilization
  - Sanitation of the Indus Valley Civilisation
- Periodisation of the Indus Valley Civilisation
- Pottery in the Indian subcontinent
  - Bara culture, subtype of Late-Harappan Phase
  - Black and red ware, belonging to Neolithic and Early-Harappan phases
  - Cemetery H culture (2000-1400 BC), early Indo-Aryan pottery at IVC sites later evolved into Painted Grey Ware culture of Vedic period
  - Sothi-Siswal culture, subtype of Early-Harappan Phase
- Rakhigarhi Indus Valley Civilisation Museum

== Notes ==
Calkins, PB; Alam M. "India". Encyclopædia Britannica. Retrieved 31 December 2008.
Lal, BB (2002). "The Homeland of Indo-European Languages and Culture: Some Thoughts". Purātattva. Indian Archaeological Society. pp. 1–5.
McIntosh, Jane (2008) The Ancient Indus Calley : New Perspectives. ABC-CLIO. p. 77
Lal, BB (2003). Excavations at Kalibangan, the Early Harappans, 1960–1969. Archaeological Survey of India. pp. 17, 98.
Kulke, Herman (2004). History of India. Routledge. p. 25.
cf. Finding Forgotten Cities.
Shri Krishna Ojha, Elements of Indian Archaeology, p. 115.
this is the wording of the official website of ASI : http://asi.nic.in/asi_exca_imp_rajasthan.asp Archived 21 July 2011 at the Wayback Machine
Tejas Garge (2010), Sothi-Siswal Ceramic Assemblage: A Reappraisal. Ancient Asia. 2, pp. 15–40. doi:10.5334/aa.10203
Elements of Indian Archaeology, p. 116.
Photographs of it are available in an article by B. B. Lal at https://web.archive.org/web/20040514210125/http://www.geocities.com/ifihhome/articles/bbl002.html
B. B. Lal, India 1947–1997: New Light on the Indus Civilization
Puratattva, 4:1–3
cf. The Indus Basin History of Irrigation, Drainage and Flood Management
Elements of Indian Archaeology, p. 117-118.
official website of ASI : http://asi.nic.in/asi_exca_imp_rajasthan.asp Archived 21 July 2011 at the Wayback Machine.
Elements of Indian Archaeology, p. 117. This book gave exactly the same information, in almost same wording, which was later used in ASI website, hence unpublished excavation reports were source of both these accounts.
B.B. Lal 1984. The earliest Datable Earthquake in India, Science Age (October 1984), Bombay: Nehru Centre
Lal, B. B., The earliest datable earthquake in India.
Frontiers of the Indus Civilization
Elements of Indian Archaeology, p. 119-120.
"Excavation Sites in Rajasthan – Archaeological Survey of India". Archived from the original on 21 July 2011. Retrieved 30 August 2007.
Bryant, Edwin (2001). The quest for the origins of Vedic culture the Indo-Aryan migration debate. New York: Oxford University Press. p. 160. ISBN 9780195137774.
The Earliest Civilization of South Asia, p. 97
Elements of Indian Archaeology, p. 120-121.
Kulke, Herman (2004). History of India. Routledge. p. 25.
Kulke, Herman (2004). History of India. Routledge. p. 25.
Elements of Indian Archaeology, p. 121.
B.B. Lal 2002, The Sarasvati flows on
Elements of Indian Archaeology, p. 117.
McIntosh, Jane.(2008) The Ancient Indus Valley: New Perspectives. ABC-CLIO. p. 114
Elements of Indian Archaeology, p. 123.
Kalibangan: Death from Natural Causes, by Raikes
Kulke, Herman (2004). History of India. Routledge. p. 25.
cf. The Homeland of Indo-European Languages and Culture: Some Thoughts

"Harappa." Encyclopædia Britannica, Encyclopædia Britannica, Inc., www.britannica.com/place/India/Harappa. Harappa, www.harappa.com/blog/kalibangan.
