= Milakpur =

- Village
- Milakpur in Haryana, India Milakpur (India)
- Coordinates: 29.01°N 75.97°E
- Country: India
- State: Haryana
- District: Bhiwani
- Established: 4700 BC
- Founder: unknown

Government
  - Type: Local government
  - Body: Panchayat

Languages
  - Official: Hindi
- Time zone: UTC+5:30 (IST)
- Vehicle registration: HR
- Website: haryana.gov.in

Milakpur is a village situated in the Bhiwani district of Haryana, India. Milakpur comes under Hisar (Lok Sabha constituency), which is represented in Lok Sabha by Dushyant Chautala of INLD. The village serves under the jurisdiction of Bhiwani Administration under police station at Bawani Khera, which also serves as Tehsil to the village.

== Economy ==
The area is known for its large number of brick kilns, which cater to the demand of bricks from surrounding areas and other areas as far flung as Bhiwani and Hisar. However, the residents are not concerned about the pollution and ecological devastation caused by them, perhaps due to lack of environmental awareness. Indeed, not even the authorities are concerned by their detrimental effect on the ecology and the environment of the area.

== See also ==
- List of Indus Valley Civilization sites
