= List of Indus Valley Civilisation sites =

The Indus Valley Civilisation (IVC), also known as the Harappan Civilisation, was a major early civilisation, existing from 3300–1300 BCE in the northwest South Asia, around the Indus River plains. It covered much of modern-day Pakistan and northwestern India, as well as possessing at least one trading colony in northeast Afghanistan. Over 1000 Indus Valley Civilisation sites have been discovered. Only 40 sites on the Indus valley were known in the pre-Partition era by archaeologists.

The most widely known Indus Valley sites are Mohenjo-daro and Harappa; Mohenjo-daro is located in Sindh, while Harappa is in Punjab. More than 90% of the inscribed objects and seals that were discovered were found at ancient urban centres along the Indus river in Pakistan, mainly in Harappa and Mohenjo-daro. More than 50 IVC burial sites have been found, including at Rakhigarhi (first site with genetic testing), Mohenjo-Daro, Harappa, Farmana, Kalibangan, Lothal, Dholavira, Mehrgarh, Banawali, Alamgirpur and Chanhudaro .

== List of Indus Valley sites ==
Indus Valley Civilisation discoveries
Year	Site	District	Province/state	Country	Image	Excavations/findings
	Alamgirpur	Meerut District	Uttar Pradesh	India		Impression of cloth on trough
	Allahdino	Karachi district	Sindh	Pakistan		Floor tiles of a house have been discovered at this site
	Amri, Sindh	Dadu District	Sindh	Pakistan		Remains of a rhinoceros
	Babar Kot	Saurashtra, Rajula	Gujarat	India		A stone fortification wall, plant remains of millets and gram
	Balu, Haryana	Kaithal	Haryana	India		Earliest evidence of garlic. Several plant remains were found here include various types of barley, wheat, rice, horse gram, green gram, multiple types of a pea, sesamum, melon, watermelon, grapes, dates, garlic, etc. (Saraswat and Pokharia - 2001-2) which is comparable to a nearby IVC site Kunal, Haryana revealed remains of rice (probably wild)
1974	Banawali	Fatehabad District	Haryana	India		Excavated in 1973 by RS Bisht. Located alongside the Saraswati River. This area contains evidence of both pre-Harappan and Harappan culture as well as high-quality barley. Found terracotta figure of a plough
	Bargaon	Saharanpur District	Uttar Pradesh	India		
	Baror	Sri Ganganagar district	Rajasthan	India		Human skeleton, ornaments, a five-meter-long and three-meter clay oven, a pitcher filled with 8,000 pearls
	Bet Dwarka	Devbhoomi Dwarka district	Gujarat	India		Late Harappan seal, inscribed jar, the mould of coppersmith, a copper fishhook
	Bhagatrav	Bharuch District	Gujarat	India		
	Bhirrana	Fatehabad District	Haryana	India		Graffiti of a dancing girl on pottery, which resembles a dancing girl statue found at Mohenjo-Daro
1931	Chanhudaro	Nawabshah District	Sindh	Pakistan		Excavated in 1931 by NG Majumdar. Located in Sindh, Pakistan, on the banks of the Indus River. Only Indus site without a citadel. Excavated items include bronze statues of bullock carts and ekkas as well as a small jar that appears to be a kink well. Bead making factory, use of lipstick,
	Chapuwala	Cholistan	Punjab	Pakistan		Unexcavated 9.6 hectares
	Daimabad	Ahmadnagar District	Maharashtra	India	bronze sculpture	A sculpture of a bronze chariot, 45 cm long and 16 cm wide, yoked to two oxen, driven by a man 16 cm high standing in it; and three other bronze sculptures. Southernmost IVC site in India, Late Harappan Phase
	Desalpur in Nakhtrana Taluka,	Kutch District	Gujarat	India		Massive stone fortification, Harappan pottery, three script-bearing seals; one of steatite, one of copper and one of terracotta
1985	Dholavira	Kutch District	Gujarat	India	Water reservoir, Dholavira	Excavated in 1967–1968 by JP Joshi. Located in the Gujarati district of Kachchh on the banks of the Luni River. Here are traces of a stadium, a special water management system, and the Harappan inscription. Figure of chariot tied to a pair of bullocks and driven by a nude human, Water harvesting and number of reservoirs, use of rocks for constructions, wooden "signboard" with Indus characters found in a gatehouse
	Farmana	Rohtak District	Haryana	India		Largest burial site of IVC, with 65 burials, found in India
	Ganweriwala		Punjab	Pakistan		Equidistant from both Harappa and Mohenjo-Daro, it is near a dry bed of the former Ghaggar River. It is a site of almost the same size as Mahenjo-daro. It may have been the third major centre in the IVC, as it is near the copper-rich mines in Rajasthan
	Gola Dhoro	kutch district	Gujarat	India		Production of shell bangles, semi-precious beads, etc.
1921	Harappa	Sahiwal District	Punjab	Pakistan	Miniature votive images or toy models from Harappa, ca. 2500. Hand-modeled terra-cotta figurines with polychromy	Excavated in 1921–1923 by Daya Ram Sahni. Located in Punjab's Montgomery district on the banks of the Ravi River (Pakistan). Excavations have been done at Cemetery-37 and Stone Dancing Natraja. The first town to be thoroughly excavated and examined is a major Indus Valley Civilisation settlement with granaries, coffin burials, and a plethora of artefacts
	Hisar mound inside Firoz Shah Palace	Hisar District	Haryana	India		Unexcavated site
	Hulas	Saharanpur District	Uttar Pradesh	India		
	Juni Kuran	Kutch District	Gujarat	India		Fortified citadel, lower town, public gathering area
	Jognakhera	Kurukshetra	Haryana	India		Copper smelting furnaces with copper slag and pot shards
	Kaj	Gir Somnath District	Gujarat	India		Ceramic artefacts, including bowls. Ancient port.
	Kanjetar	Gir Somnath District	Gujarat	India		Single phase Harapppan site
1953	Kalibangan	Hanumangarh District	Rajasthan	India		Excavated in 1961 by BB Lal. Located alongside the Ghaggar River. There has been evidence of a ploughed field, a wooden furrow, seven fire altars, camel bones, and two different kinds of burials (rectangular and circular graves). Baked/burnt bangles, fire altars, small circular pits containing large urns and accompanied by pottery, bones of camel
	Karanpura near Bhadra city	Hanumangarh district	Rajasthan	India	Wesern mound called citadel	Skeleton of child, terracotta like pottery, bangles, seals similar to other Harappan sites
	Khirasara	Kutch district	Gujarat	India		Warehouse, industrial area, gold, copper, semi-precious stone, shell objects, and weight hoards
	Kerala-no-dhoro or Padri	Saurashtra	Gujarat	India		Salt production centre, by evaporating sea water
	Kot Bala (also, Balakot)	Lasbela District	Balochistan	Pakistan		Earliest evidence of furnace, seaport
	Kot Diji	Khairpur District	Sindh	Pakistan		
	Kotada Bhadli	Kutch District	Gujarat	India		Fortification bastion few houses foundations
	Kunal, Haryana	Fatehabad District	Haryana	India		Earliest pre-Harappan site, Copper smelting.
	Kuntasi	Rajkot District	Gujarat	India		Small port
	Lakhan-jo-daro	Sukkur District	Sindh	Pakistan		Major unexcavated site (greater than 300 hectares)
1922	Larkana	Larkana District	Sindh	Pakistan		
	Loteshwar	Patan District	Gujarat	India		Ancient archaeological site
1953	Lothal	Ahmedabad District	Gujarat	India		1931; excavated by NG Majumdar. Excavated in 1931 by NG Majumdar. Located in Sindh, Pakistan, on the banks of the Indus River. Bead making factory, dockyard, button seal, fire altars, painted jar, earliest cultivation of rice (1800 BC)
	Manda, Jammu	Jammu District	Jammu & Kashmir	India		Northernmost Harappan site in Himalayan foothills
	Malwan	Surat District	Gujarat	India		Southernmost Harappan site in India
	Mandi	Muzaffarnagar district	Uttar Pradesh	India		
	Mehrgarh	Kachi District	Balochistan	Pakistan		Earliest agricultural community (7000-5000 BC)
	Mitathal	Bhiwani District	Haryana	India		
1922	Mohenjo-Daro	Larkana District	Sindh	Pakistan		Excavated in 1922 by RD Bannerji. Located in Sindh's Larkana district on the banks of the Indus River (Pakistan). The site's unique features are the Assembly Hall, Collegiate Building, and Great Bath. An excavated artefact includes a piece of woven cotton and the seal of Pashupati Mahadeva, or proto-Shiva. Great Bath (the biggest bath ghat), Great granary, Bronze dancing girl, Bearded man, terracotta toys, Bull seal, Pashupati seal, three cylindrical seals of the Mesopotamian type, a piece of woven cloth
	Morodharo	Kutch District	Gujarat	India		Fortified settlement. Mature and late Harappan phases of civilisation found. Harappan jar shards, burial cairns, boundary stones to mark graves found. Closely resembles Dholavira and has evidence of being an ancient seaport.
	Nageshwar	Kutch District	Gujarat	India		Shell working site
	Navinal	Kutch district	Gujarat	India		
	Nausharo near Dadhar	Kachi District	Balochistan	Pakistan		
	Ongar	Hyderabad	Sindh	Pakistan		
	Pabumath	Kutch District	Gujarat	India		A large building complex, unicorn seal, shell bangles, beads, copper bangles, needles, antimony rods, steatite micro beads; pottery include large and medium size jars, beaker, dishes, dish-on-stand, perforated jars etc.; fine red pottery with black painted designs etc.
	Pathani Damb	Makran	Balochistan	Pakistan		At 100 hectares, this has the potential to be another city
	Pir Shah Jurio	Karachi	Sindh	Pakistan		
	Pirak	Sibi	Balochistan	Pakistan		
	Rakhigarhi	Hisar District	Haryana	India		Terracotta wheels, toys, figurines, pottery. Large site, partially excavated
	Rangpur	Ahmedabad District	Gujarat	India		Seaport
	Rehman Dheri	Dera Ismail Khan	Khyber Pakhtunkhwa	Pakistan		
	Rojdi	Rajkot District	Gujarat	India		
	Rupar	Rupnagar District	Punjab	India		
	Sanauli	Baghpat District	Uttar Pradesh	India		Burial site with 125 burials found, copper antenna sword with a hilt and first time chariots were discovered
	Sheri Khan Tarakai	Bannu District	Khyber-Pakhtunkhwa	Pakistan		Pottery, lithic artefact
	Shikarpur, Gujarat	Kutch District	Gujarat	India		Food habit details of Harappans
	Shortugai	Darqad District	Takhar Province	Afghanistan		
	Siswal	Hisar (district)	Haryana	India		
	Sokhta Koh	Makran	Balochistan	Pakistan		Pottery
	Sothi near Baraut	Bagpat district	Uttar Pradesh	India		
1964	Surkotada	Kutch District	Gujarat	India		Excavated in 1972 by JP Joshi. Located between the Sabarmati and Bhogavo rivers. Here, there is proof of a horse burial, an oval grave, and a pit burial. Bones of a horse (only site)
	Sutkagan Dor	Makran	Balochistan	Pakistan		Bangles of clay, westernmost-known site of IVC
	Tigrana	Bhiwani district	Haryana	India		Houses, pottery, terracotta, seals with script, semi-precious stones, evidence of crop cultivation and anima; domestication.
	Vejalka	Botad district	Gujarat	India		Pottery

== Context of IVC sites and cultures ==
Wider context of the IVC includes the following:

- Meluhha
  - Indo-Mesopotamia relations
  - Conflict with the Akkadians and Neo-Sumerians
- List of inventions and discoveries of the Indus Valley Civilisation
  - Sanitation of the Indus Valley Civilisation
- Periodisation of the Indus Valley Civilisation
  - Pottery in the Indian subcontinent
  - Bara culture, subtype of Late-Harappan Phase
  - Cemetery H culture (2000-1400 BC), early Indo-Aryan pottery at IVC sites later evolved into Painted Grey Ware culture of Vedic period
  - Black and red ware, belonging to Neolithic and Early-Harappan phases
  - Sothi-Siswal culture, subtype of Early-Harappan Phase

== See also ==
- Timeline of Pakistani history
- Timeline of Indian history
- List of archaeological sites by country
- World Heritage Sites by country
