= Sothi (archaeology) =

Archaeological site of the Indus Valley Civilization

Coordinates: 29.1255°N 74.7264°E

- 28.5866947, 73.7625641
- Type: Early Indus Valley Civilisation site
- Location: Bikaner District, Rajasthan, India

History
- Built: Around 4600 BCE

Site notes
- Excavation dates: Luigi Pio Tessitori (first discovery), Aurel Stein (1942), Amalananda Ghosh (1950–53), Kshetrams Dalal(1980)

Sothi is an early archaeological site of the Indus Valley Civilisation dating to around 4600 BCE, located in the Bikaner District of Rajasthan, India, at a distance of about 10 km southwest of Nohar railway station.

== Excavations ==
First discovered by Luigi Pio Tessitori, the site was later visited by Aurel Stein (1942), Amalananda Ghosh (1950–53), and Kshetrams Dalal (1980).

== Location ==
It is situated in the plain of the ancient Ghaggar and Chautang rivers that were flowing parallel to each other from east to west in this area. About 60 km to the west, the large Indus settlement of Kalibangan was situated at the confluence of these rivers.

Siswal, in Haryana, is located about 70 km to the east, and has similar remains. This is now known as Sothi-Siswal culture.

The ancient site of Rakhigarhi is about 140 km east from Sothi, and together with Sothi and Siswal, was situated in the valley of the Chautang river.

Karanpura is also located nearby along the Chautang.

In the view of many scholars, Ghaggar was the ancient Sarasvati River of myth and legend, and Chautang, its tributary, was the Drishadvati river.

== Sothi-Siswal culture ==
Sothi-Siswal culture: Based on the pottery found here, it is classified as a separate archaeological culture / subculture. This culture is named after these two sites, located 70 km apart. It was widespread in Rajasthan, Haryana, and in the Indian Punjab. As many as 165 sites of this culture have been reported. There are also broad similarities between Sothi-Siswal and Kot Diji ceramics. Kot Diji culture area is located just to the northwest of the Sothi-Siswal area.

Sothi-Siswal ceramics are found as far south as the Ahar-Banas culture area in southeastern Rajasthan.

Sothi is the site of a Pre-Indus Valley Civilisation settlement dating to as early as 4600 BCE.

According to Tejas Garge, Sothi culture precedes Siswal culture considerably, and should be seen as the earlier tradition.

== Ceramics ==
Sothi ceramic ware may feature painted pipal leaves, or fish scale designs. External ribbing and external cord impressions are also typical of Sothi ceramics, as are ceramic toy cart wheels and the short-stemmed dish on a stand. Sothi ware is present at almost all the Harappa sites in the Ghaggar valley, and also to the south.

The historical period represented by Sothi ware is also called Kalibangan I. Mature Harappan period is designated Kalibangan II.

== See also ==
- Indus Valley Civilization
- List of Indus Valley Civilization sites
  - Bhirrana, 4 phases of IVC with earliest dated to 8th–7th millennium BCE
  - Kalibanga, an IVC town and fort with several phases starting from Early harappan phase
  - Rakhigarhi, one of the largest IVC city with 4 phases of IVC with earliest dated to 8th–7th millennium BCE
  - Kunal, pre harappan cultural ancestor of Rehman Dheri
- List of inventions and discoveries of the Indus Valley Civilization
  - Hydraulic engineering of the Indus Valley Civilization
  - Sanitation of the Indus Valley Civilisation
  - Periodisation of the Indus Valley Civilisation
- Pottery in the Indian subcontinent
  - Bara culture, subtype of Late-Harappan Phase
  - Black and red ware, belonging to Neolithic and Pre-Harappan phases
  - Kunal culture, subtype of Pre-Harappan Phase
  - Sothi-Siswal culture, subtype of Pre-Harappan Phase
  - Cemetery H culture (2000–1400 BC), early Indo-Aryan pottery at IVC sites later evolved into Painted Grey Ware culture of Vedic period
- Rakhigarhi Indus Valley Civilisation Museum
