= Haibatpur =

- Village
- Location in Punjab, India Haibatpur (India)
- Coordinates: 31.524143°N 75.384938°E
- Country: India
- State: Punjab
- District: Kapurthala

Government
  - Type: Panchayati raj (India)
  - Body: Gram panchayat

Population (2011)
  - Total: 518
- Sex ratio 267/251♂/♀

Languages
  - Official: Punjabi
  - Other spoken: Hindi
- Time zone: UTC+5:30 (IST)
- PIN: 144624
- Telephone code: 01822
- ISO 3166 code: IN-PB
- Vehicle registration: PB-09
- Website: kapurthala.gov.in

Haibatpur is a village in Kapurthala district of Punjab State, India. It is located 25 kilometres (16 mi) from Kapurthala, which is both district and sub-district headquarters of Haibatpur. The village is administrated by a Sarpanch who is an elected representative of village as per the constitution of India and Panchayati raj (India).

== Demography ==
According to the report published by Census India in 2011, Haibatpur has total number of 85 houses and population of 518 of which include 267 males and 251 females. Literacy rate of Haibatpur is 75.27%, lower than state average of 75.84%. The population of children under the age of 6 years is 49 which is 9.46% of total population of Haibatpur, and child sex ratio is approximately 1042, higher than state average of 846.

== Population data ==
Particulars	Total	Male	Female
Total No. of Houses	85	-	-
Population	518	267	251
Child (0-6)	49	24	25
Schedule Caste	228	126	102
Schedule Tribe	0	0	0
Literacy	75.27 %	80.25 %	69.91 %
Total Workers	164	152	12
Main Worker	162	0	0
Marginal Worker	2	0	2

== Air travel connectivity ==
The closest airport to the village is Sri Guru Ram Dass Jee International Airport.
