= Oriyo Timbo =

Archaeological site in India

Oriyo Timbo is an archeological site belonging to Indus Valley Civilisation located in Bhavnagar District, Gujarat State, India. The site, located 70 kilometres (43 mi) from Rojdi, another Indus Valley site, measures 4 hectares (9.9 acres).

== Excavation ==
The excavation at this site was undertaken by Gujarat State Department of Archeology and University Museum of University of Pennsylvania.

=== Archaeobotanical investigations ===
Evidence of early agricultural activities were found at this site belonging to Harappan period. Oriyo Timbo has undergone extensive archaeobotanical investigations and Seetha Narayana Reddy has found significant agricultural practices at this site. Significant find include Millet (ragi)

== Findings ==
Multiple strata at the site evinced two periods of occupation: an earlier period evidenced by microlithic tools and ceramics, and a later period characterized by Lustrous Red Ware (an important ceramic of the post-urban phase of this area). Gregory Possehl states that "Oriyo Timbo also produced some radio carbon dates for the micro lithic occupation (Rissman and Chitawala 1990) which indicate that this can be dated to the entire third millennium, possibly extending as far back in time as c. 3700 BC" and hunter-gatherers were present in this area at the time when Lothal was occupied.

== See also ==
- Babar Kot
- Desalpur
- Pabumath
