= Babar (disambiguation) =

Babar is a male given name of Persian origin and may refer to:

== Places ==
- Babar District, Khenchela Province, Algeria
  - Babar, Algeria, a municipality in Babar District
- Babur, Iran (disambiguation)
- Babar Pur, a census town in Delhi, India
- Babar Islands, Maluku Province, Indonesia
- Babar Kot, an Indus Valley archeological site in the Saurashtra region of Gujarat, India

== Kinship ==
- Babar (Pashtun tribe), Pashtun tribe
- Babbar (tribe), Baloch tribe

== Other uses ==
- Babar the Elephant, a character in Jean de Brunhoff's series of children's books, and the films and television shows based on them
  - Babar (TV series), a Canadian/French animated fantasy television series
  - Babar and the Adventures of Badou, a 2010 animated series
  - "Babar the Little Elephant", a ballet by Donald Himes
- BaBar experiment, an international collaboration of physicists and engineers
- Babar languages, a group of Timor languages spoken on the Babar Islands

== See also ==
- Babbar (disambiguation)
- Babor (disambiguation)
- Babr, a genus of amphipod crustaceans in the family Pallaseidae
- Babur (disambiguation)
