= Babur (disambiguation) =

Babur (1483–1530), born Zahīr ud-Dīn Muhammad, was the founder and first Emperor of the Mughal dynasty in South Asia.

Babur may also refer to:

- Babur (cruise missile), a Pakistani short-range missile
- Babur, Iran (disambiguation), places that share the name
- Babur Square, in Andijan, Uzbekistan
- Book of Babur (or Baburnama), the memoirs of Ẓahīr-ud-Dīn Muhammad Bābur
- PNS Babur, several ships in the Pakistani navy
- Babar, 1960 Indian film by Hemen Gupta, starring Gajanan Jagirdar as the emperor

== See also ==
- Babar (disambiguation)
- Babor (disambiguation)
- Shahenshah Babar, 1944 Indian film about the emperor
- Babr, a genus of amphipod crustaceans in the family Pallaseidae
- Gardens of Babur, a park in Kabul, Afghanistan
- Lower Babur, a village in Arghandab District, Kandahar Province, Afghanistan
