= Religion of the Indus Valley Civilisation =

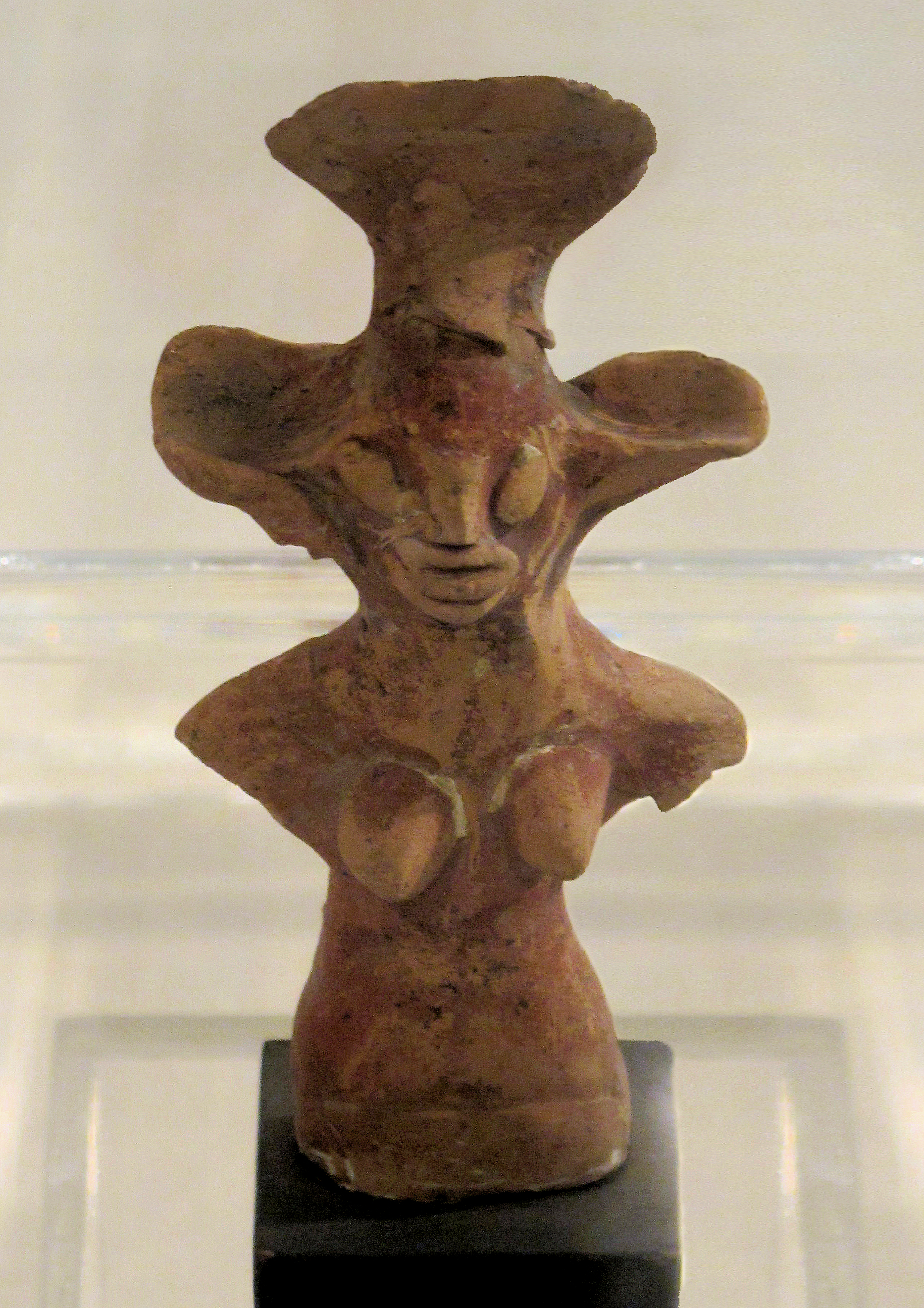
Female figurine. Mature Harappan period, 2700–2000 BCE. Indus Valley Civilisation. National Museum, New Delhi.

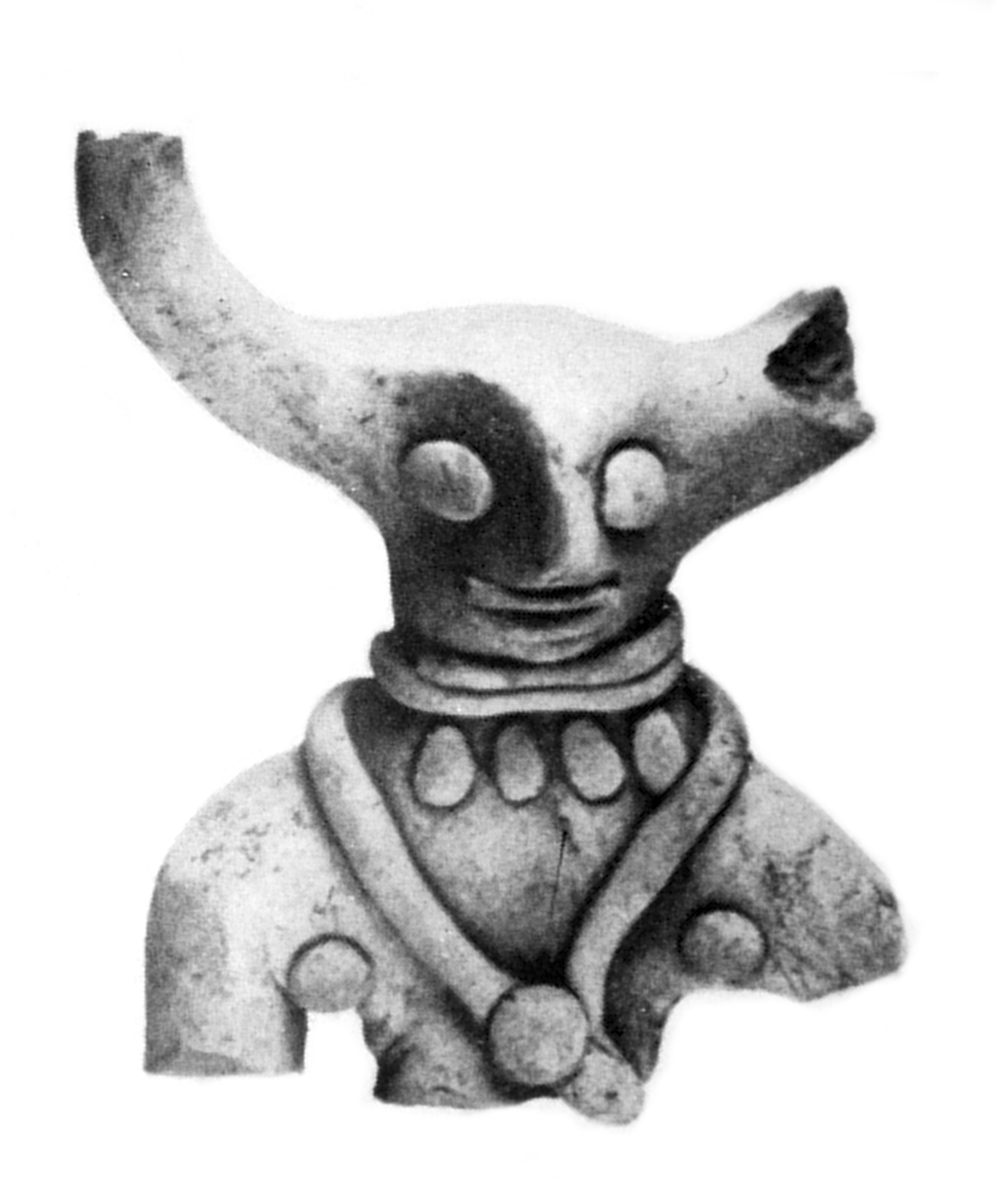
Indus Civilisation pottery figure of horned deity.

The religion and belief system of the Indus Valley Civilisation (IVC) people have received considerable attention, with many writers concerned with identifying to the religious practices and deities of much later Indian religions. However, due to the sparsity of evidence, which is open to varying interpretations, and the fact that the Indus script remains undeciphered, the conclusions are partly speculative and many are largely based on a retrospective view from a Hindu perspective.

== Indus Valley Civilisation ==
The Indus Valley Civilisation was a Bronze Age civilisation in the northwestern regions of South Asia, lasting from 3300 BCE to 1300 BCE, and in its mature form from 2600 BCE to 1900 BCE. (Note: Wright: "Mesopotamia and Egypt ... co-existed with the Indus civilization during its fluorescence between 2600 and 1900 BC.") Together with ancient Egypt and Mesopotamia, it was one of three early civilizations of the Near East and South Asia, and of the three, the most widespread, its sites spanning an area stretching from today's northeast Afghanistan, through much of what is now Pakistan, and into western and northwestern India. (Note: Wright: "The Indus civilization is one of three in the 'Ancient East' that, along with Mesopotamia and Pharaonic Egypt, was a cradle of early civilization in the Old World (Childe, 1950). Mesopotamia and Egypt were longer-lived, but coexisted with the Indus civilization during its fluorescence between 2600 and 1900 B.C. Of the three, the Indus was the most expansive, extending from today’s northeast Afghanistan to Pakistan and India.") It flourished in the basins of the Indus River, which flows through modern-day republics of India and Pakistan along a system of perennial, mostly monsoon-fed, rivers.

In these other civilisations, large temples were a central key element of cities, and religious imagery abounded. Once the scripts had been deciphered, the names of deities and the characteristics attributed to them became fairly clear. None of this is the case for the IVC.

== Scholarly views on IVC-religion ==
Early and influential work in the area that set the trend for Hindu interpretations of archaeological evidence from the Harappan sites was that of John Marshall, who in 1931 identified the following as prominent features of the Indus religion: a Great Male God and a Mother Goddess; deification or veneration of animals and plants; a symbolic representation of the phallus and vulva; and, use of baths and water in religious practice. Marshall's interpretations have been much debated, and sometimes disputed over the following decades. Geoffrey Samuel, writing in 2008, finds all attempts to make "positive assertions" about IVC religions as conjectural and intensely prone to personal biases.

In contrast to contemporary Egyptian and Mesopotamian civilisations, the Indus Valley lacks any monumental palaces, even though excavated cities indicate that the society possessed the requisite engineering knowledge. This suggests that religious ceremonies, if any, may have been largely confined to individual homes, small temples, or the open air. Several sites have been proposed by Marshall and later scholars as possibly devoted to religious purposes, but at present only the Great Bath at Mohenjo-Daro is widely thought to have been so used, as a place for ritual purification. The funerary practices of the Harappan civilisation are marked by fractional burial (in which the body is reduced to skeletal remains by exposure to the elements before final interment), and even cremation.

Contemporary scholars (most significantly Asko Parpola) continue to probe the roles of the IVC in the formation of Hinduism; others remain ambivalent about these results. (Note: Reviews of Parpola's works have been fairly critical. This notion of IVC-traces, says Hiltebeitel, is deemed as the "substratum theory" by scholars in opposition. Compare linear versus synthetic development in the origins of yoga.) In reviewing a book by Parpola in 2017, Wendy Doniger wrote: "I have supported the thesis that there is some form of continuity between the IVC and later Hinduism. I am now more than ever persuaded that IVC culture survived the destruction of its cities and that later Hindu imagery, having entered Hinduism after the Vedic period, may well be derived from the IVC. But I remain skeptical about Parpola's reconstruction of the IVC's religion."

== Seals ==
The imagery on the great majority of Indus seals centres on a single animal; generally, various attempts to attribute religious significance to these have not been widely accepted. But a minority are more complicated and prominently feature figures with a human form, and there has been much discussion of these.

=== Pashupati seal ===
Pashupati seal

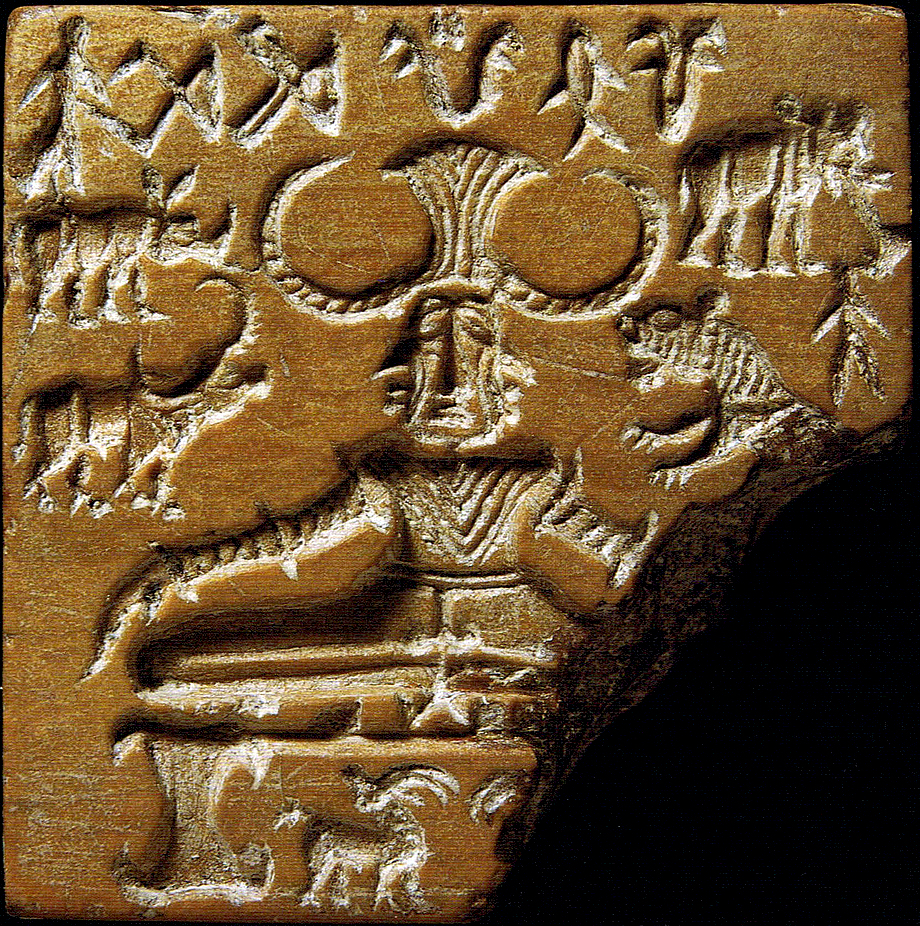
Seal

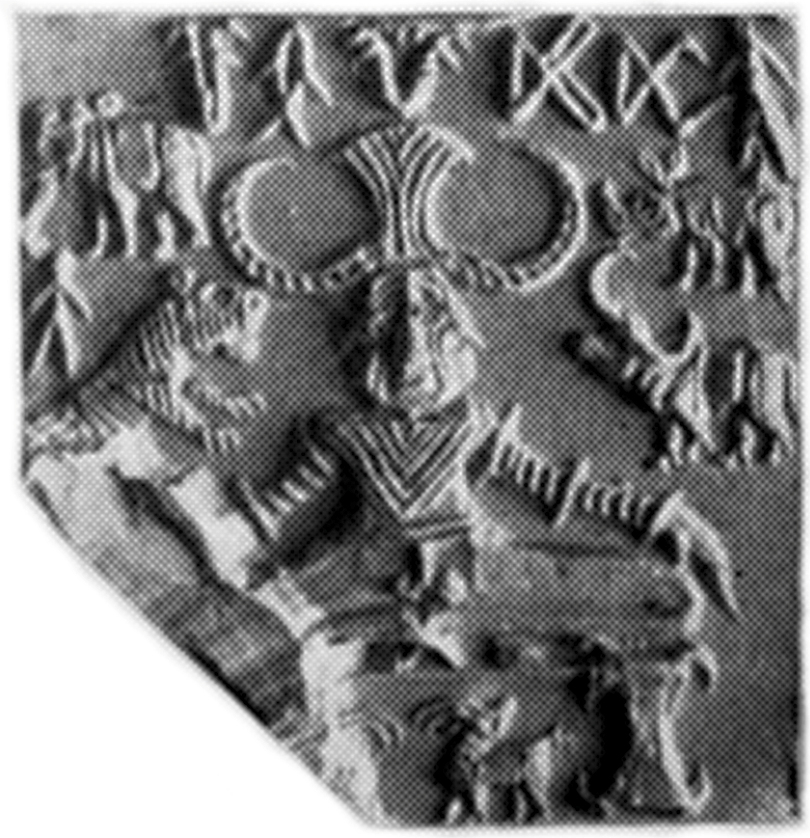
Impression

The Pashupati seal discovered during excavation of the Indus Valley archaeological site of Mohenjo-Daro. Circa 2350-2000 BCE.

Many discussions of religion in IVC center around the most famous of the Indus seals; though interpretations of it have varied greatly, almost all do accord it some religious significance. The broken seal given the find number 420 shows a large central figure, either horned or wearing a horned headdress and possibly ithyphallic as well as tricephalic, seated in a posture reminiscent of the Yogic Lotus position, surrounded by four wild animals – elephant, tiger, buffalo, and rhinoceros. Marshall concluded the figure to be Pashupati (Lord of Animals; epithet of the Hindu deity Shiva the Rudra) and it remained a piece of unassailable evidence in favor of IVC influencing Hinduism for a few decades. This identification (and terminology) is now rejected by modern scholars – Jonathan Mark Kenoyer notes that the figure cannot be linked to later icons without deciphering the script: even if they look apparently similar, conveyed meanings might have been radically different.

In 1976, Doris Meth Srinivasan mounted the first substantial critique of Marshall's identification. She accepted the figure to be indicative of cultic divinity, that people bowed towards such a posture (on other seals) but rejected the proto-Shiva identification: Pashupati of Vedic Corpus is the protector of domestic animals. On comparison to facial particulars from horned masks and painted vessels, Srinivasan went on to propose the central figure to be a Buffalo-man, who had a "humanized bucranium" and whose headdress imparted powers of fertility. Gavin Flood, about two decades later, noted that neither the Lotus position nor the anthropomorphic form of the central figure was deducible to any certainty. Alf Hiltebeitel rejects a proto-Shiva identification; he supports Srinivasan's thesis with additional arguments, and hypothesize the Buffalo-man to have formed the legend of Mahishasura. (Note: Mahishasura is a Sanskrit word composed of Mahisha meaning buffalo and asura meaning demon, thus meaning Buffalo Demon. Mahishasura had gained the boon that no man could kill him. In the battles between the Devas and the demons (asuras), the Devas, led by Indra, were defeated by Mahishasura. Subjected to defeat, the Devas assembled in the mountains where their combined divine energies coalesced into Goddess Durga. The newborn Durga led a battle against Mahishasura, riding a lion, and killed him. Thereafter, she was named Mahishasuramardini, meaning The Killer of Mahishasura.) Gregory L. Possehl concluded that while it would be appropriate to recognise the figure as a deity, its association with the water buffalo, and its posture as one of ritual discipline, regarding it as a proto-Shiva would be going too far.

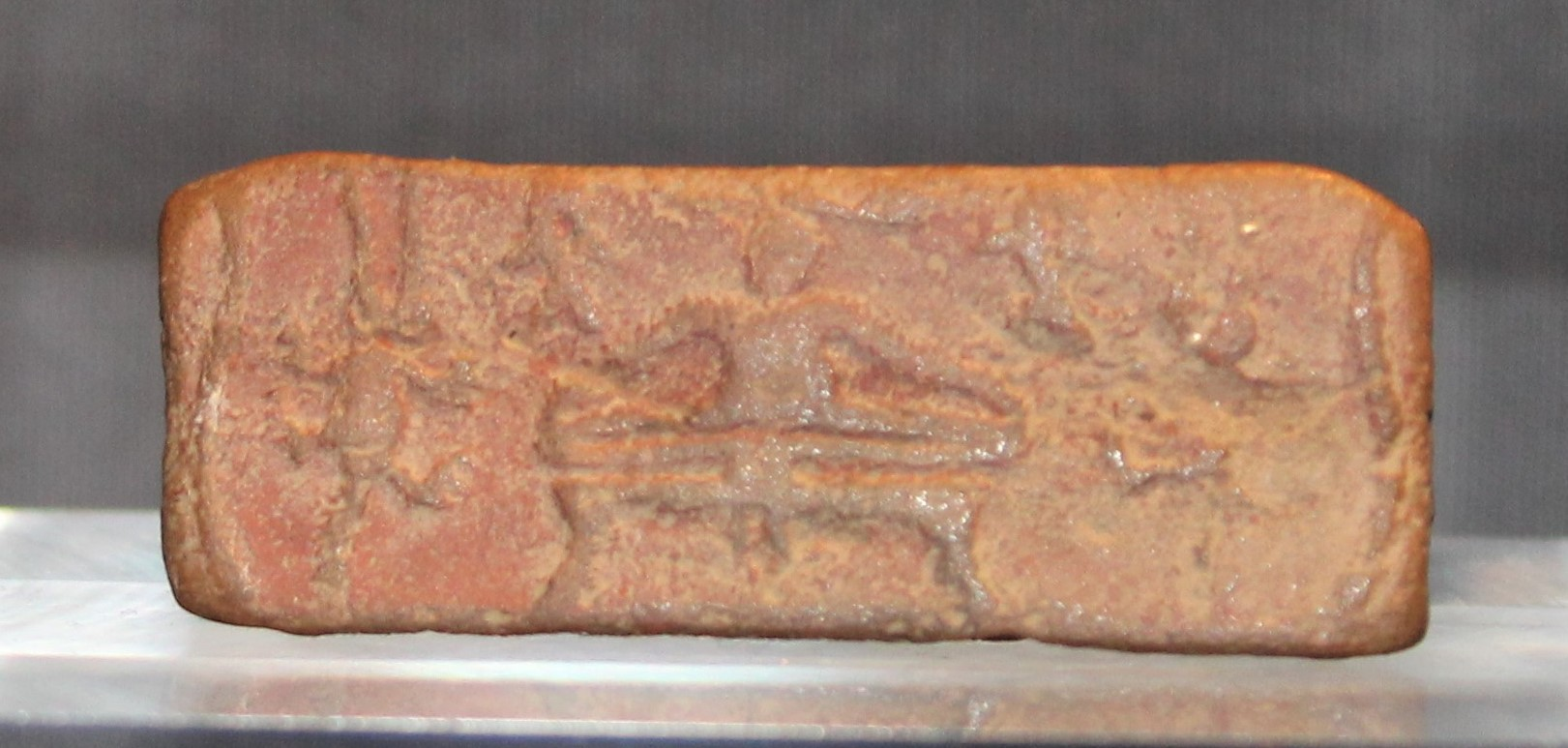
Triangular prism sealing, depicting a male cult figure seated in a yogic posture on a throne, a bull-like animal, and five characters in the Indus script. From Mohenjo-daro, Mature Harrapean period, c. 2600-1900 BC. Ashmolean Museum.

Some scholars of Yoga – Karel Werner, Thomas McEvilley et al – have since used it to trace back the roots of Yoga to IVC. However, Geoffrey Samuel, writing in 2008, rejects Marshall's theory as mere anachronistic speculation and goes on to reject that yoga has its roots in IVC, as does Andrea R. Jain (2016) in Selling Yoga. Paleontologist-cum-Indologist Alexandra Van Der Geer, in her 2008 survey of Indian mammals in art, comments the figure to remain "unknown" until the script is deciphered. Samuel as well as Wendy Doniger had taken a similar stance. Kenoyer (as well as Michael Witzel) now consider the image to be an instance of Lord of the Beasts found in Eurasian neolithic mythology or the widespread motif of the Master of Animals found in ancient Near Eastern and Mediterranean art, and the many other traditions of horned deities. (Note: Witzel: "It is known from internal evidence that the Vedic texts were orally composed in northern India, at first in the Greater Punjab and later on also in more eastern areas, including northern Bihar, between ca. 1500 BCE and ca. 500–400 BCE. The oldest text, the Rgveda, must have been more or less contemporary with the Mitanni texts of northern Syria/Iraq (1450–1350 BCE); ..." (p. 70) "a Vedic connection of the so-called Siva Pasupati found on some Harappa seals (D. Srinivasan 1984) cannot be established; this mythological concept is due, rather, to common Eurasian ideas of the “Lord of the Animals” who is already worshipped by many Neolithic hunting societies.")

=== Procession seal ===
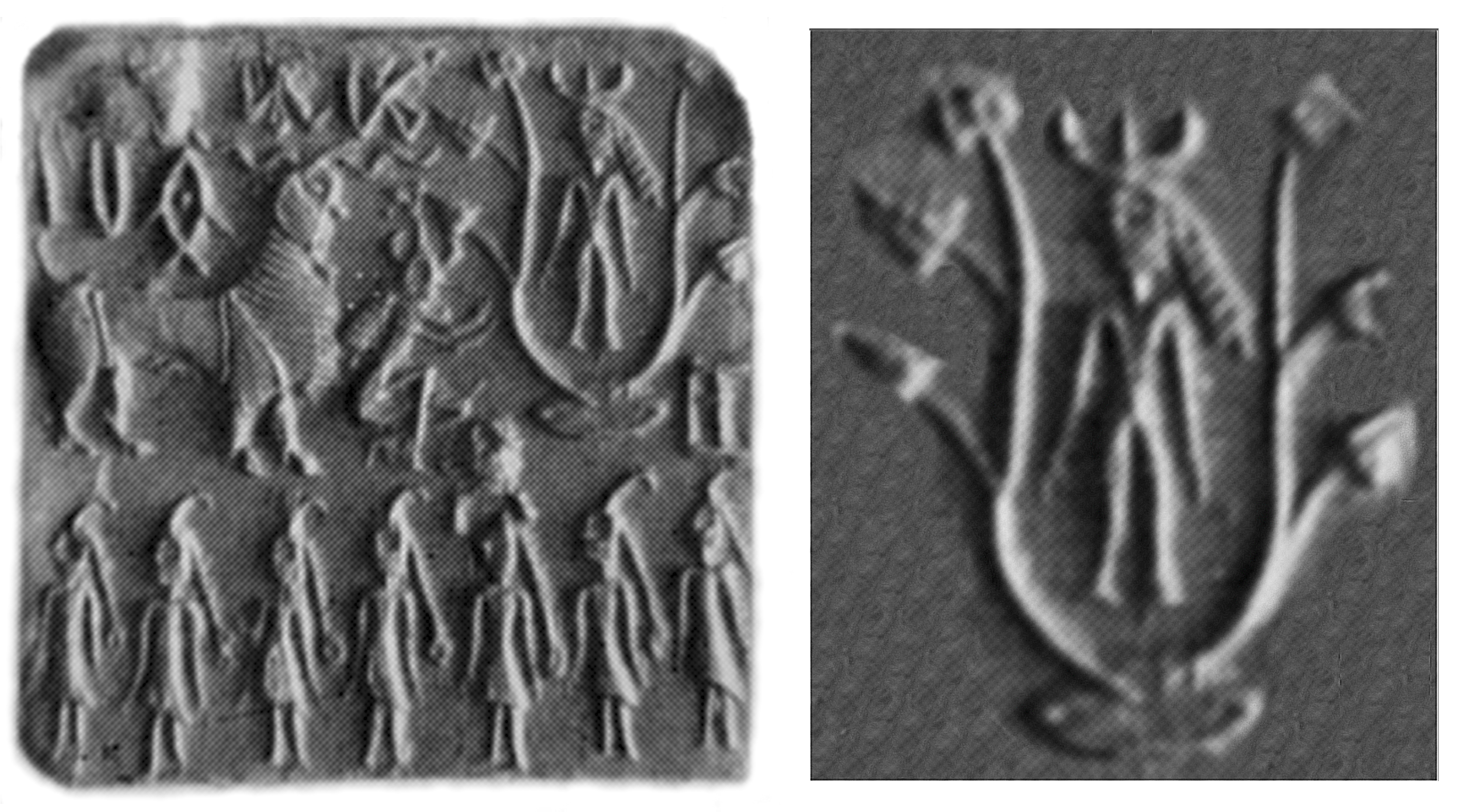
Procession seal: horned figure in a pipal tree with one-horned attendants and bull figure. 2000-1900 BCE. Islamabad Museum.

Another seal from Mohenjo-daro (Find no. 420, now Islamabad Museum, 50.295), also called the "sacrifice" seal, of a type with a few examples found, is generally agreed to show a religious ritual of some kind, though readings of the imagery and interpretations of the scene vary considerably. It shows signs of wear from heavy usage. At top right, a figure with large horns and bangles on both arms stands in a pipal tree; it is generally agreed this represents a deity. Another figure kneels on one knee in front of this, also shown as horned and perhaps with plumes in a headdress. This is interpreted as a worshipper, perhaps a priest. Beside this figure there is what may be "a human head with hair tied in a bun", resting on a stool. Behind this a large horned animal, usually agreed to be a ram, perhaps with a human head, completes the top tier of the images.

In a lower tier, seven more or less identical figures, shown in a line in right-facing profile (on the seal, so left-facing on impressions), wear plumed headdresses, bangles, and dresses falling to around knee-level. What seems to be their hair is tied in a braid and comes down to waist level. Their gender is unclear, though they are often thought to be female. Groups of seven figures are seen in other pieces, and a number of IVC seals show a variety of trees, that may have a religious significance, and do so in later Hinduism – banyan, pipal, and acacia.

=== Swastika seals ===
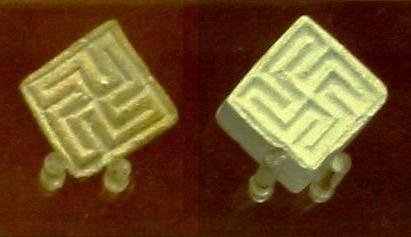
The swastika, which is seen on artifacts from the Indus Valley Civilisation, is an important symbol in Indian religions

The swastika is a symbol sacred to multiple Indian religions – Hinduism, Buddhism and Jainism. Since the icon has been located in IVC artifacts, a continuum has been posited by a few scholars but it is a fringe view – Possehl finds such suppositions to be not "sound". Jonathan Mark Kenoyer notes that these artifacts were utilized by political and religious leaders of the subcontinent to claim ties of Hinduism with IVC.

IVC swastikas were primarily engraved in button (and square) seals. Manabu Koiso and other scholars classify the signs as "geometric motifs" (Note: Other "geometric motifs" include concentric circles, knots, and stars.); these types became extremely predominant at the end of the Mature Harappan Phase and the relative sizing of these seals might have reflected socio-economic, political, and religious hierarchy. E. C. L. During Caspers found the swastika seals to have served "mercantile purposes" in certain trade routes; Gregory Possehl has separately documented relevant trade-circulation. Kenoyer notes the IVC swastika to be an abstract "decorative motif" that might have reflected contemporary ideology; he also posits a possible usage in trade – the seals either denoted the owners involved in a commercial transaction or were proto-bureaucratic certifications.

Overall, the precise purpose of these seals in the IVC continues to remain inconclusive but it is unlikely that they served any religio-ritualistic purpose. Also, the swastika had developed in multiple cultures of the world contemporaneous to or even pre-dating the IVC. Since the swastika has been recorded in early Andronovo culture, the roots of the Hindu swastika might easily lie in the Indo-Aryan migrations.

=== Other peculiar seals ===
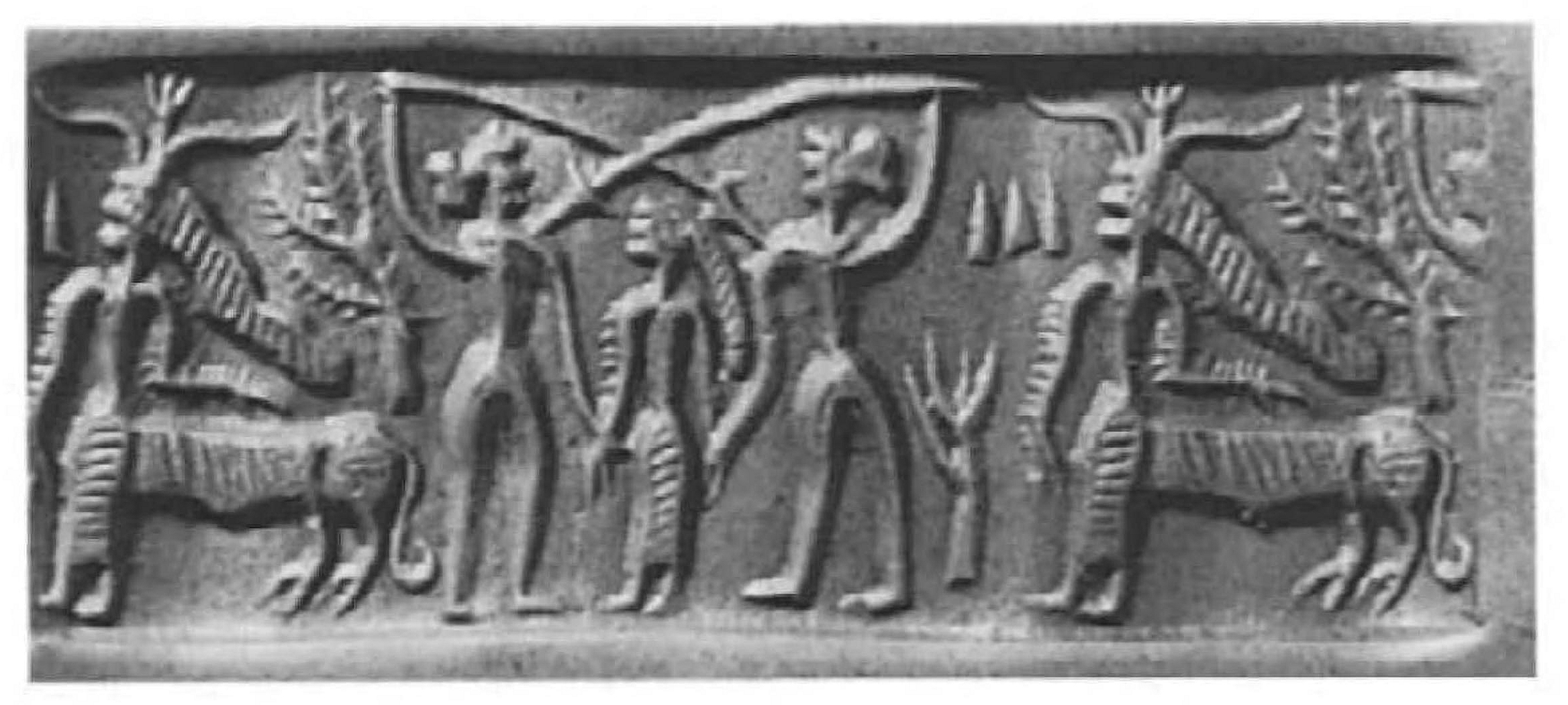
Kalibangan cylinder seal, with horned human-tiger, and two nude men fighting over a woman. Indus Valley Civilisation. The seal share remarkable similarity with the Sunda and Upasunda episode mentioned in Mahabharat.

Most Indus seals depict a single animal, without obvious narrative meaning. Several are more complex, with possible symbolic designs, as well as human or semi-human figures in action.

A bull-man or bull-woman, equipped with hooves, a tail and large horns, can be seen fighting a fantastic horned beast. Men can be seen hiding in trees from tigers, another fighting two tigers at a time in a motif reminiscent of the Master of animals.

The Kalibangan cylinder seal also depicts a human-tiger (in this case graphically represented by a human with horns to whom the body of a tiger is adjoined), with two nude men fighting over a woman, reminiscent of Mesopotamian cylinder seals such as those depicting goddess Ishtar.

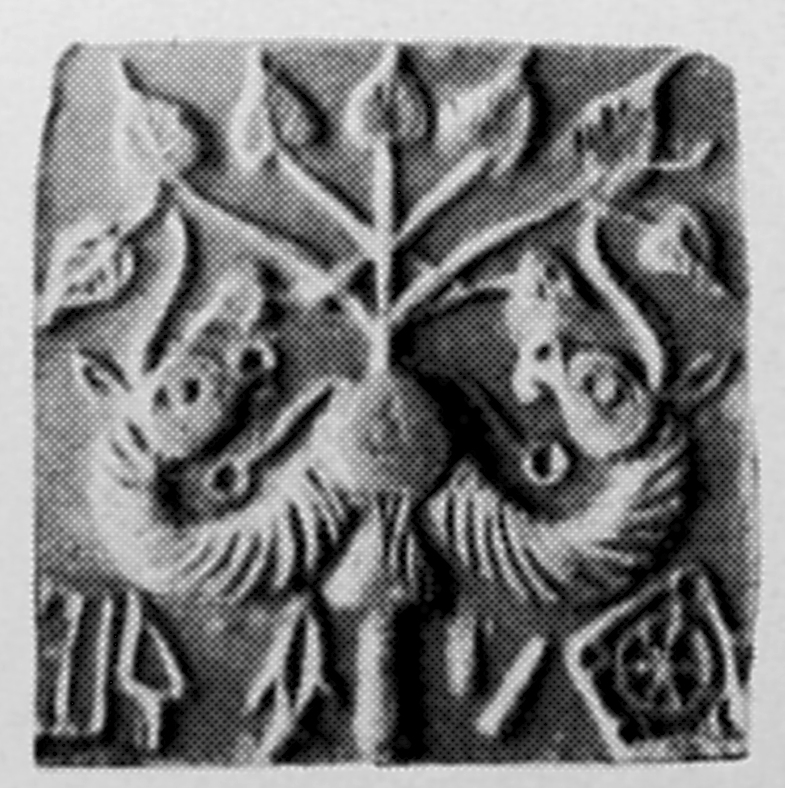
Unicorns emerging from a tree trunk. Mohenjo-daro.

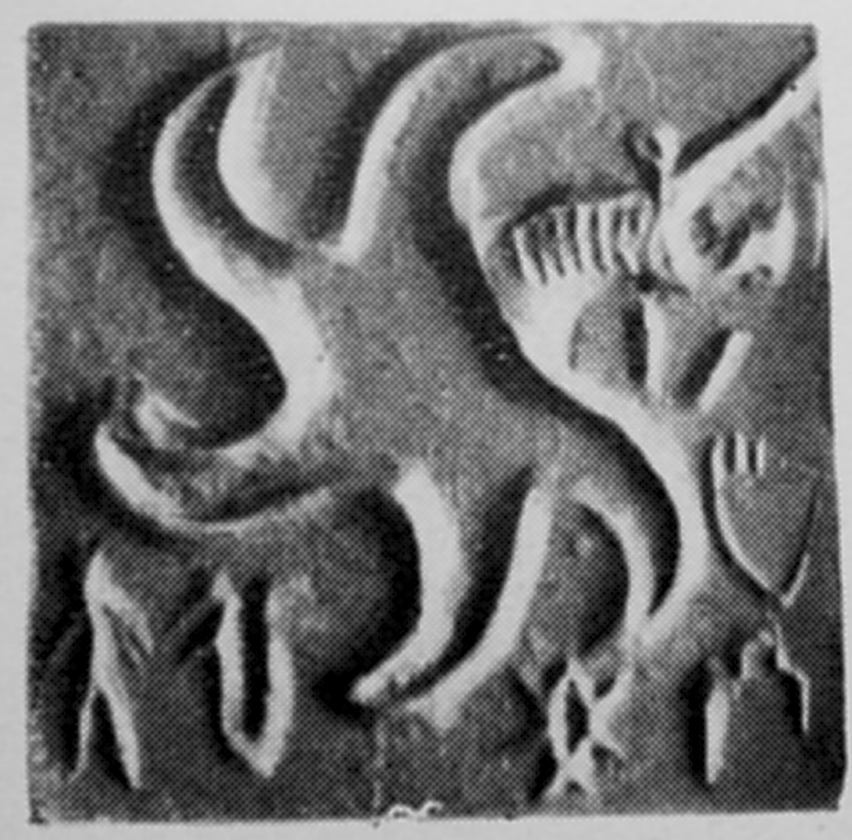
Unicorn emerging from a star-shaped object. Mohenjo-daro.

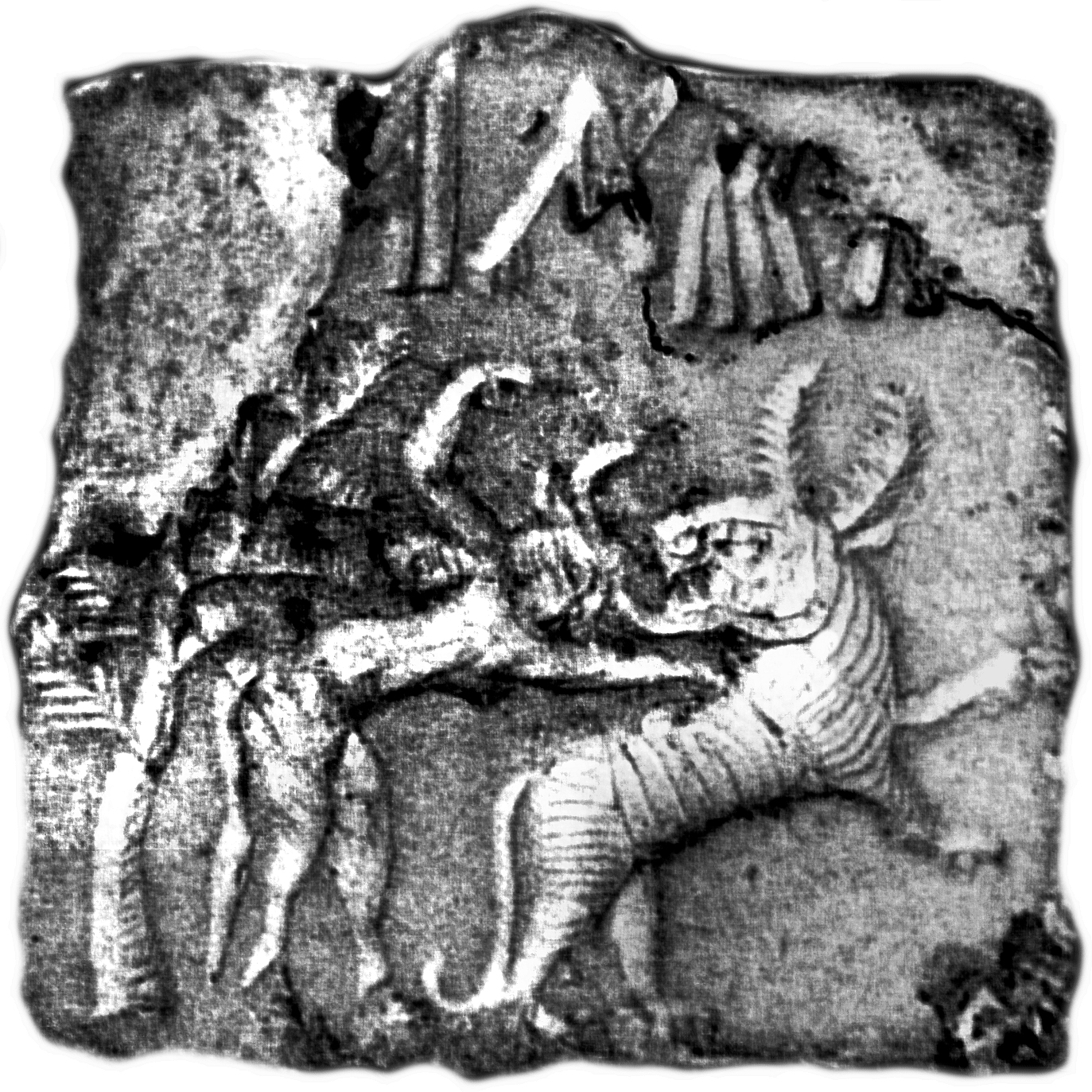
Bull-man or bull-woman fighting a horned beast.

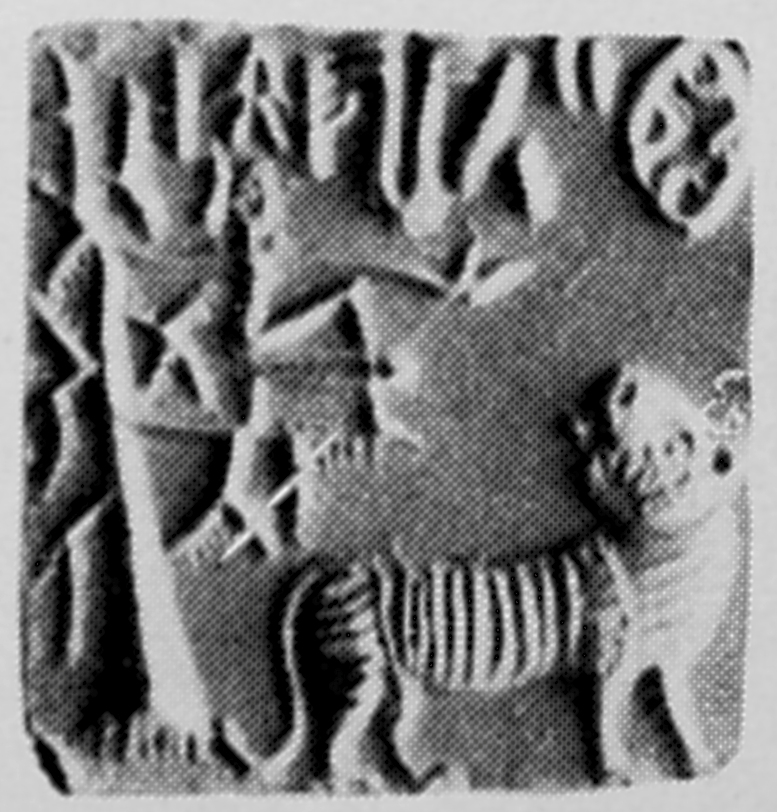
Man in a tree seating on a branch, while a tiger looks up at him. Mohenjo-daro.

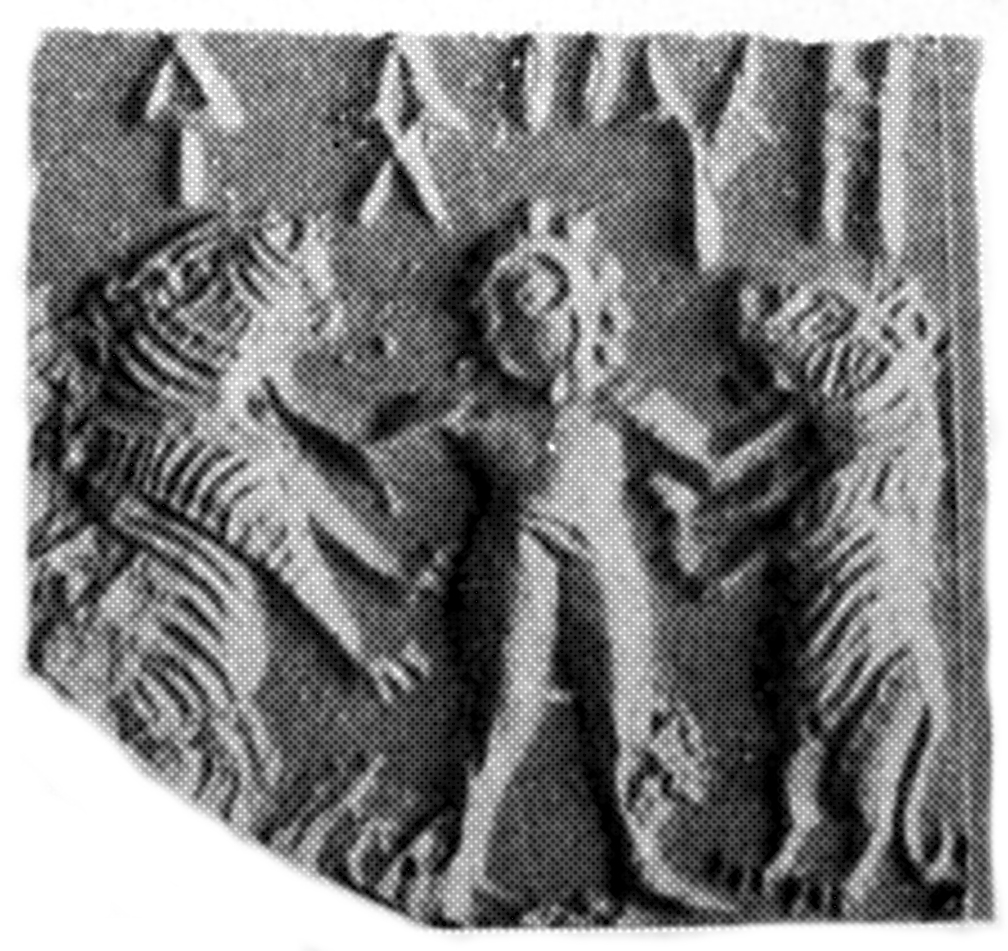
Man holding tigers. Mohenjo-daro.

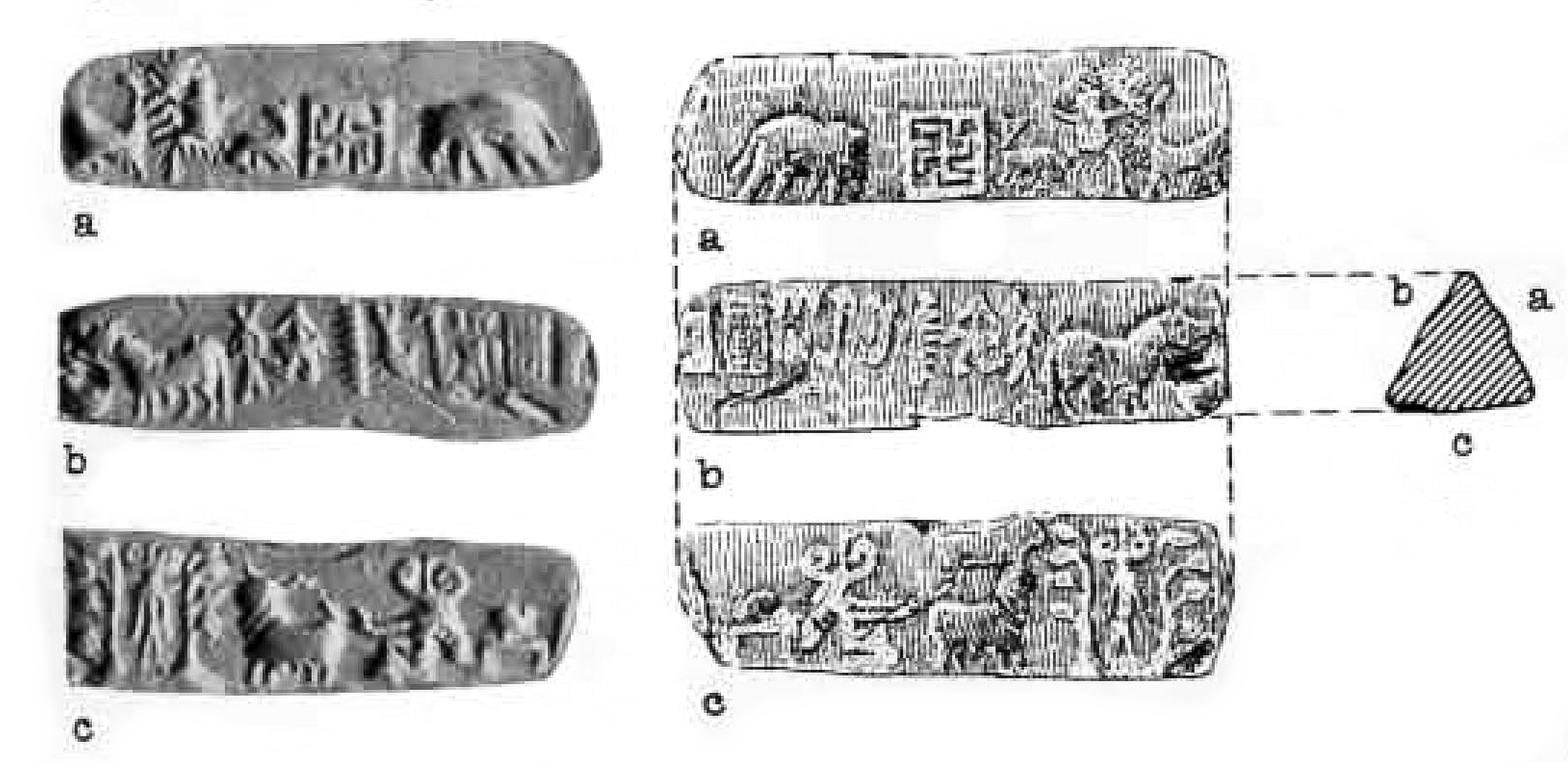
Mohenjo-daro three-faced seal, with swastika (top) and standing deity in pipal tree (bottom).

== Sculptures ==
=== Terracotta figurines ===
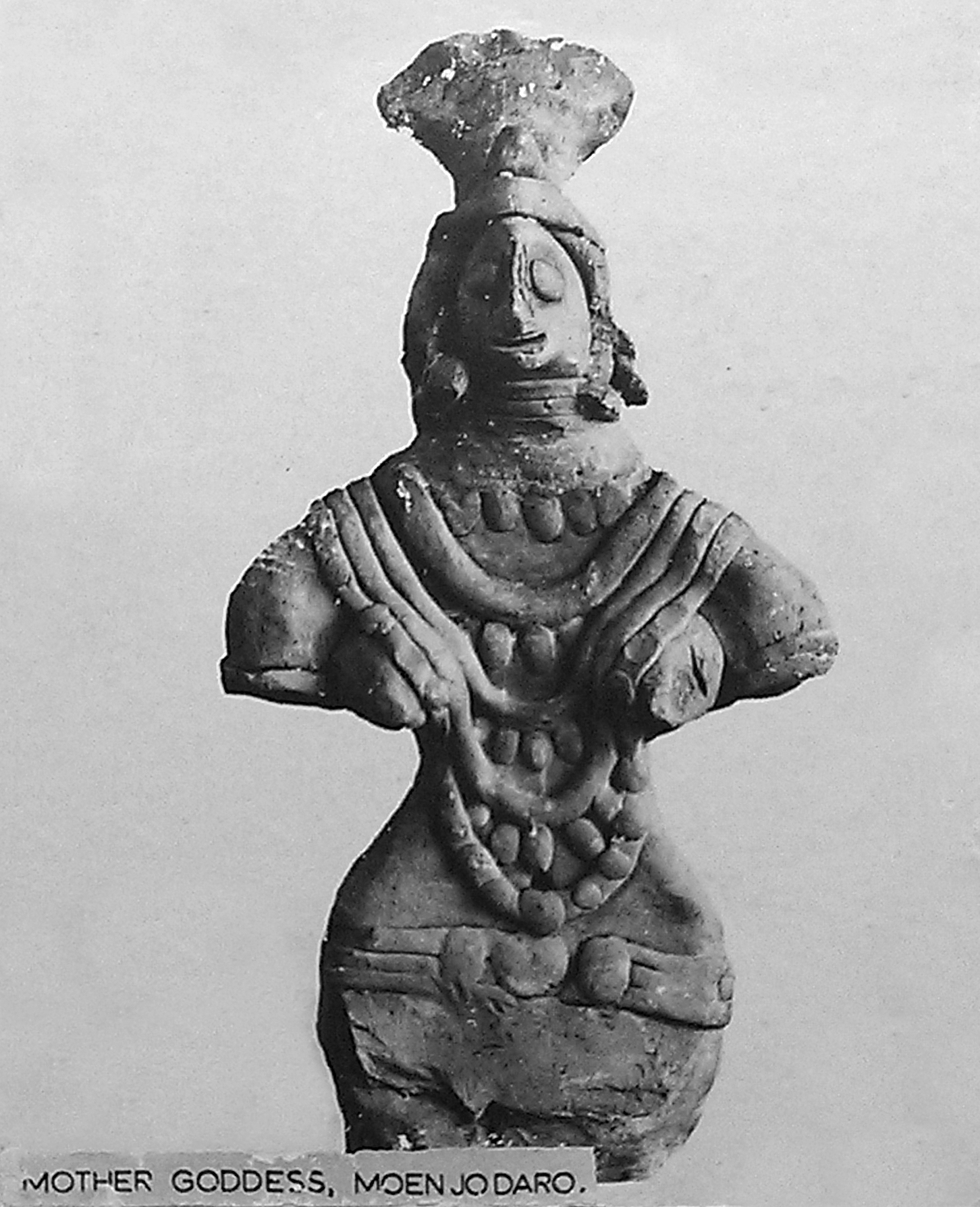
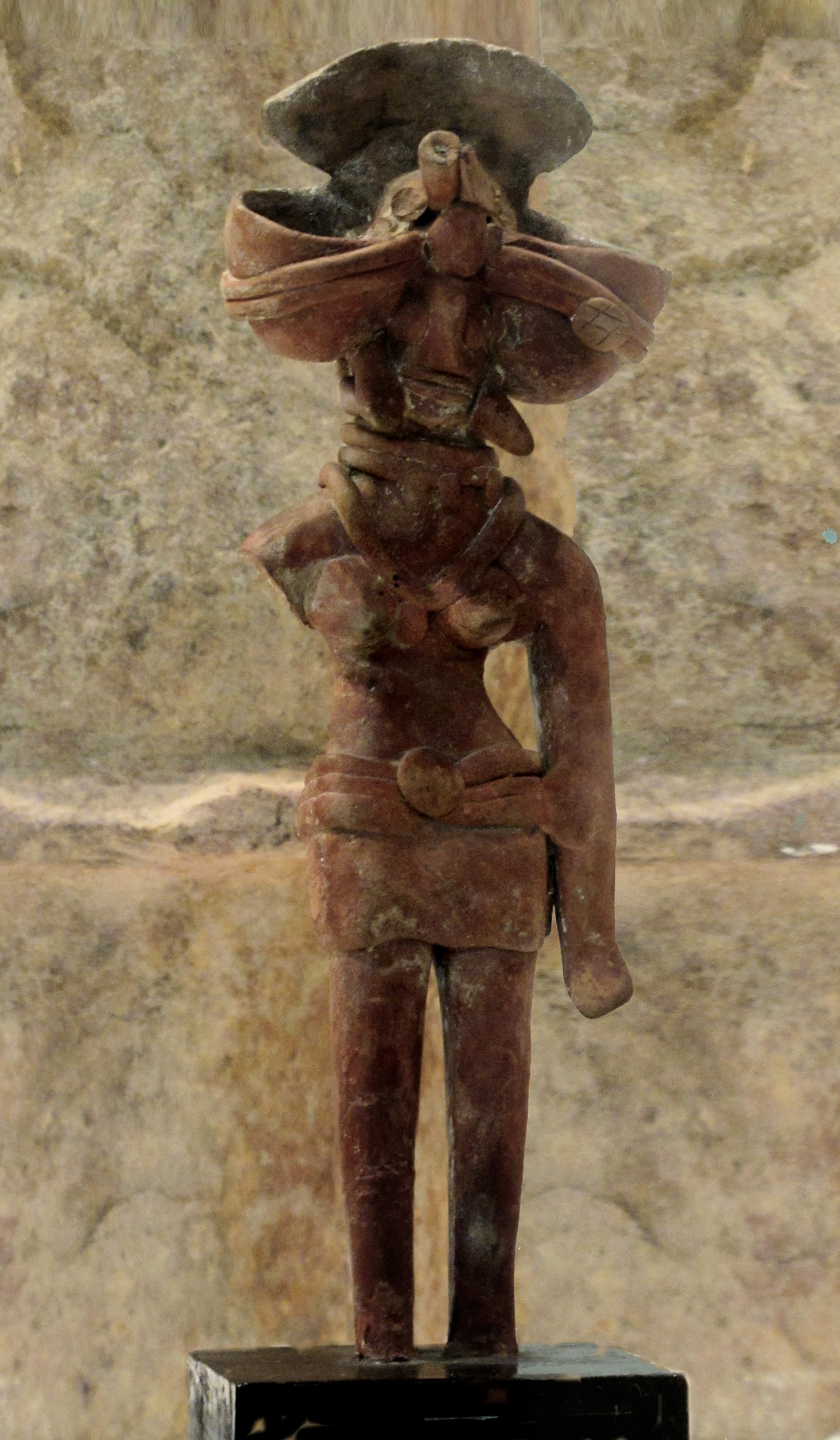
Terracotta figurines excavated from Indus Valley Civilisation.

A common class of terracotta statuettes have been identified as figurines of a "mother goddess" (and goddess of fertility, by extension) by a spectrum of scholars — Ernest J. H. Mackay, Marshall, Walter Fairservis, Bridget Allchin, Hiltebeitel, Jim G. Shaffer, and Parpola among others — thus positing links to the Shakti tradition in Hinduism. Recent scholarship rejects such identification and links; a common function alternatively proposed for the figures is as dolls for young girls. Scholars like David Kinsley and Lynn Foulston accept the figurine-identifications, but rejects that there is any conclusive evidence to link them with Shaktism. Sree Padma, in an anthropological study of the Grāmadevatā tradition, finds pre-Hindu roots but declines to explicitly identify it with IVC. Kenower remains ambiguous — the figurines might have been worshipers or deities — and does not mention of any links with Shaktism. Yuko Yukochi, in her "landmark publication" on Shaktism, refuses to discuss IVC influences — the undeciphered script did not allow integrating the archeological with the literary.

Peter Ucko had challenged the very identification as early as 1967 but failed to make any noticeable dent. In the last three decades, the identification has been increasingly rejected by a newer generation of scholars — Sharri Clark, Ardeleanu-Jansen, Ajay Pratap, P.V. Pathak, and others. In 2007, Gregory Possehl found the evidence in favor of such an identification to be "not particularly robust". Shereen Ratnagar (2016) rejects the identification, as being based on flimsy evidence. As does Doniger. Clark, in what has been described as a ground-breaking work on terracotta figurines of Harappa, emphatically rejects that there exists any bases for the Mother Goddess identification or hypothesizing a continuance into Hinduism.

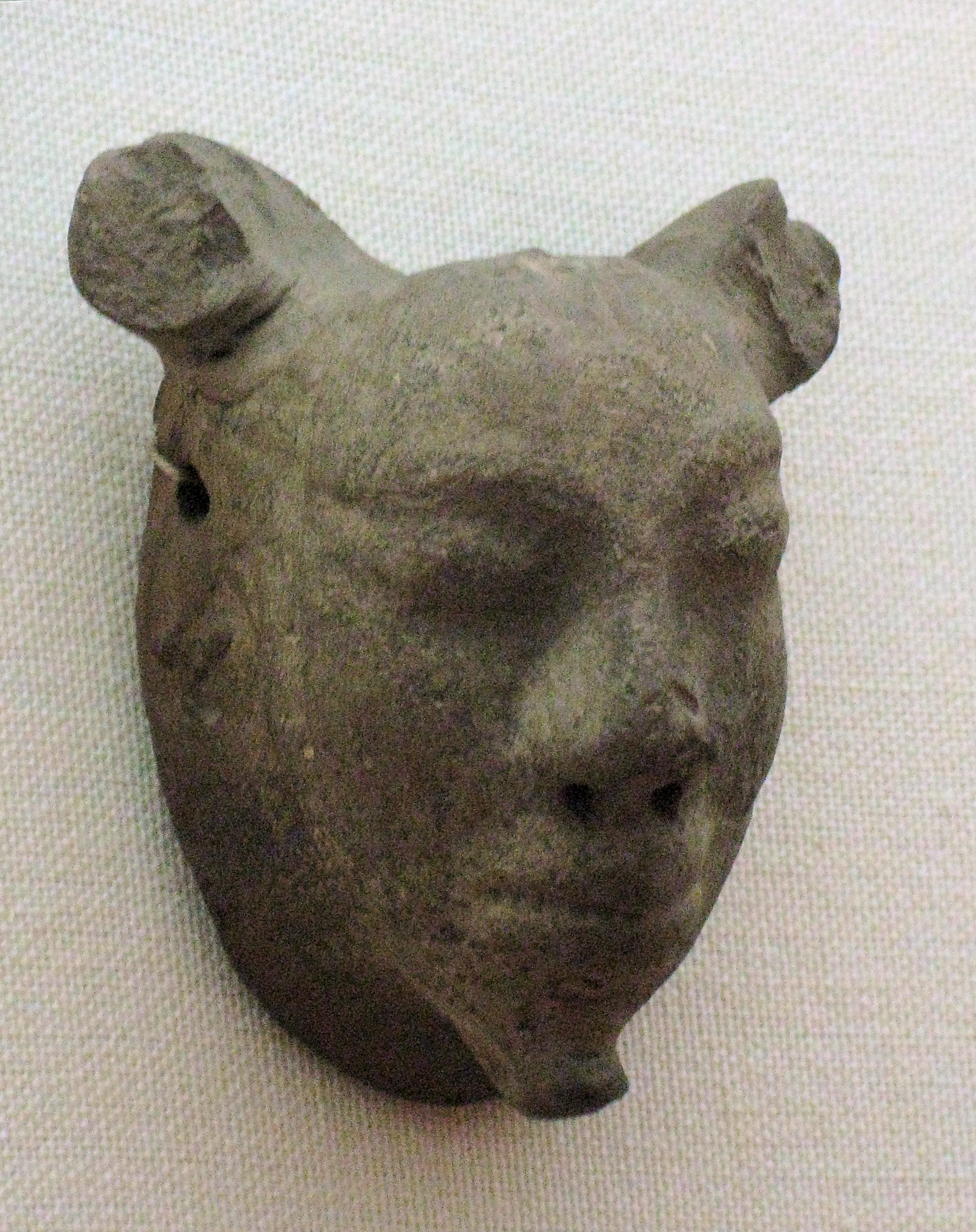
Harappan mask of a bearded horned deity, National Museum, Delhi.

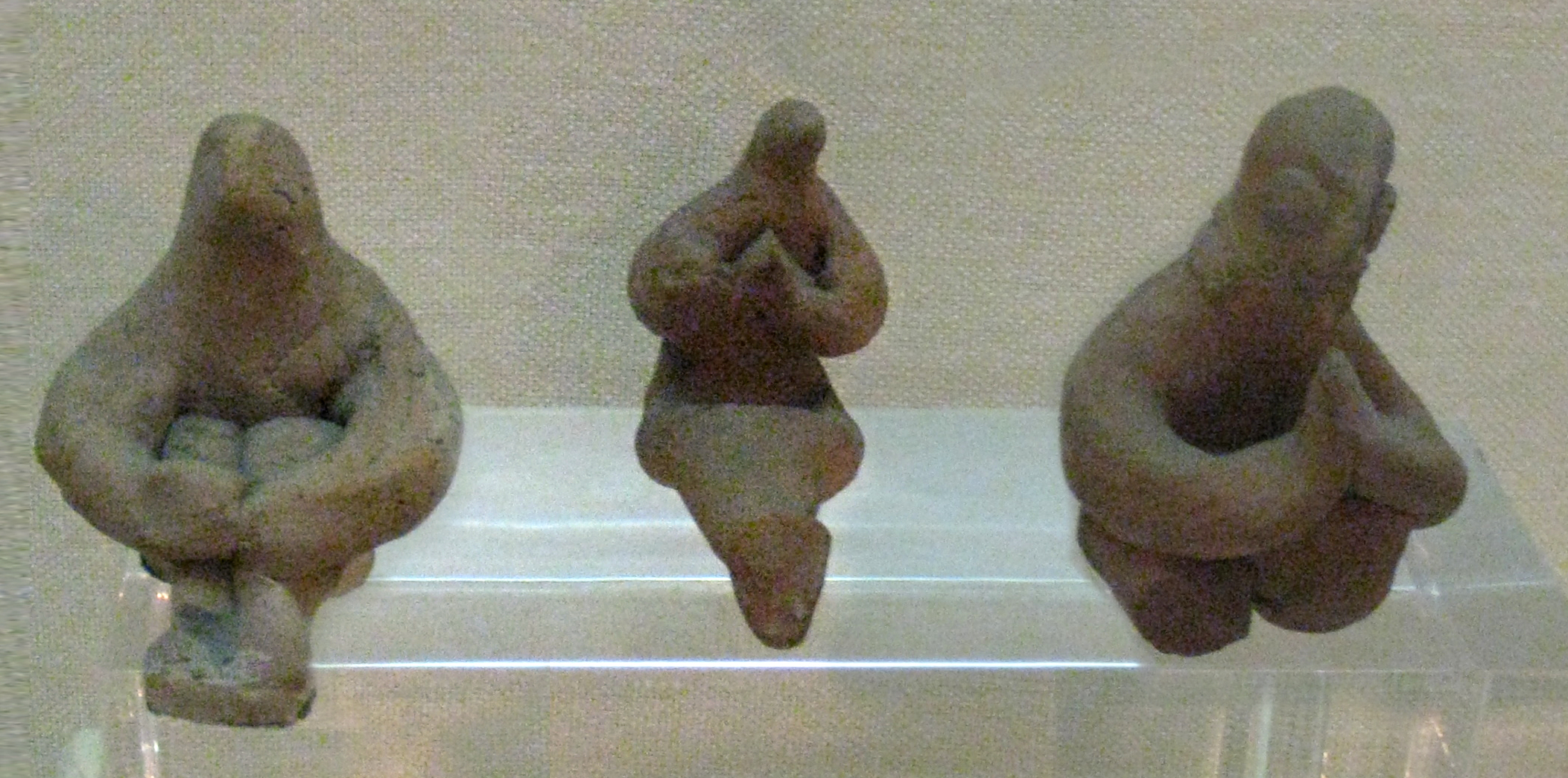
Harappan seated and praying figurines, National Museum, Delhi.

=== Priest King ===
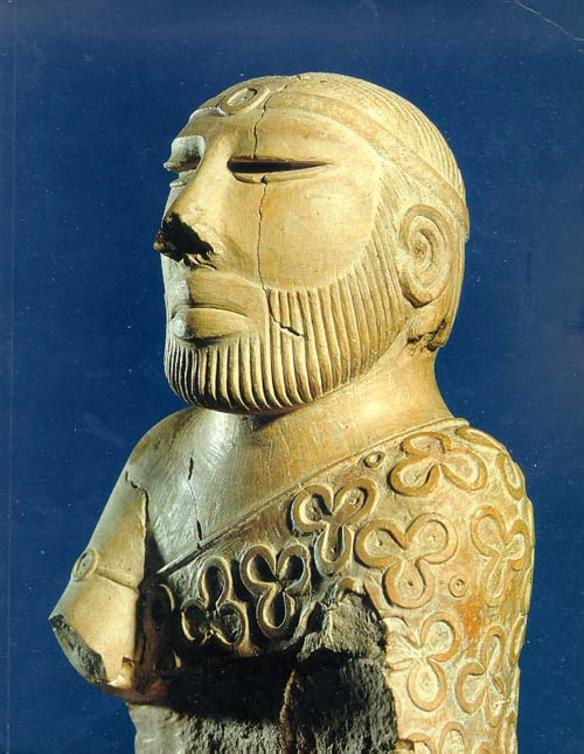
The so-called Priest-King

This, though broken off at the bottom, is agreed to be the best of a handful of small stone sculptures of male figures found at Mohenjo-daro. Mackay, the archaeologist leading the excavations at the site when the piece was found, thought the statuette might represent a "priest". John Marshall agreed and regarded it as possibly a "king-priest", but it appears to have been his successor, Sir Mortimer Wheeler, who was the first to use the designation of Priest-King in support of his proposition that the urban complexities had to necessarily result from a ruling class. (Note: The absence of palatial structures meant that typical kings were not a good fit. So, the idea of a military-theocratic state was borrowed from Mesopotamia.) One of the "seven principal pieces of human sculpture from Mohenjo-daro", Parpola has even hypothesized that it resembles later Indian traditions of priesthood.

The terminology is not preferred in modern scholarship (Note: For an example, see Hermann Kulke and Dietmar Rothermund referring to the statuette as "so-called Priest King" in the latest edition of their classic introductory text for undergraduates, A History of India.) and scholars have increasingly shifted to the view that IVC was a far egalitarian society with some kind of clan rule. Modern scholars find the term as well as the hypothesis to be highly speculative, problematic, and "without foundation" — Wendy Doniger in a scathing review noted that Parpola's "desire and imagination" surpassed available evidence. The statuette is now believed by many to be the result of interactions with the culture to the north, the Bactria–Margiana Archaeological Complex, around the Oxus river.

=== Miscellaneous ===
A broken stone sculpture — after reconstruction of missing limbs — has been proposed to assume a dancer's pose, thus being evocative of Nataraja. Another broken clay figurine has female breasts and male genitals, bearing some similarities with Ardhanarishvara.

== Architecture ==
=== Buildings ===
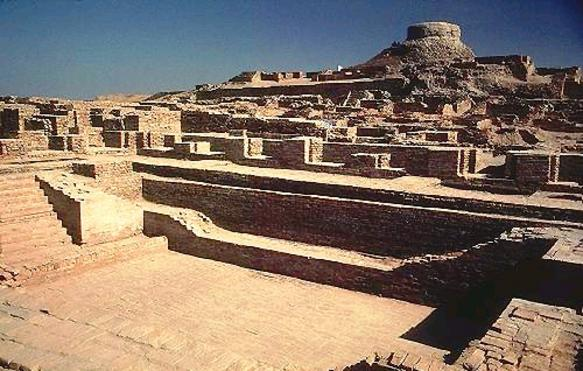
The Great Bath, Mohenjo-daro, found in 1926. Behind is the later Buddhist stupa, whose base has not been excavated.

Kenower notes that certain large structures might have been used as temples but their precise function cannot be determined; Possehl asserts there is a total absence of temples. Hiltebeitel and a few other scholars suggest that the elevated citadel complex might have served sacred functions — Possehl rejected such arguments.

=== Great Bath: Water and Cleanliness ===
Some scholars, deriving from Marshall, propose the Great Bath of Mohenjo-daro to be a forerunner of ritual bathing, central to Hinduism. Doniger rejects the hypotheses; to her, the Great Bath is only suggestive of Harappans having a propensity for water/bath. Possehl finds Marshall's theory of a ritual purpose to be convincing.

Elaborate sewage networks suggest to Hiltebeitel and Parpola an excessive concern with personal cleanliness, which is correlated to the development of caste-pollution theories in Hinduism.

=== Stones ===
==== Yonis ====
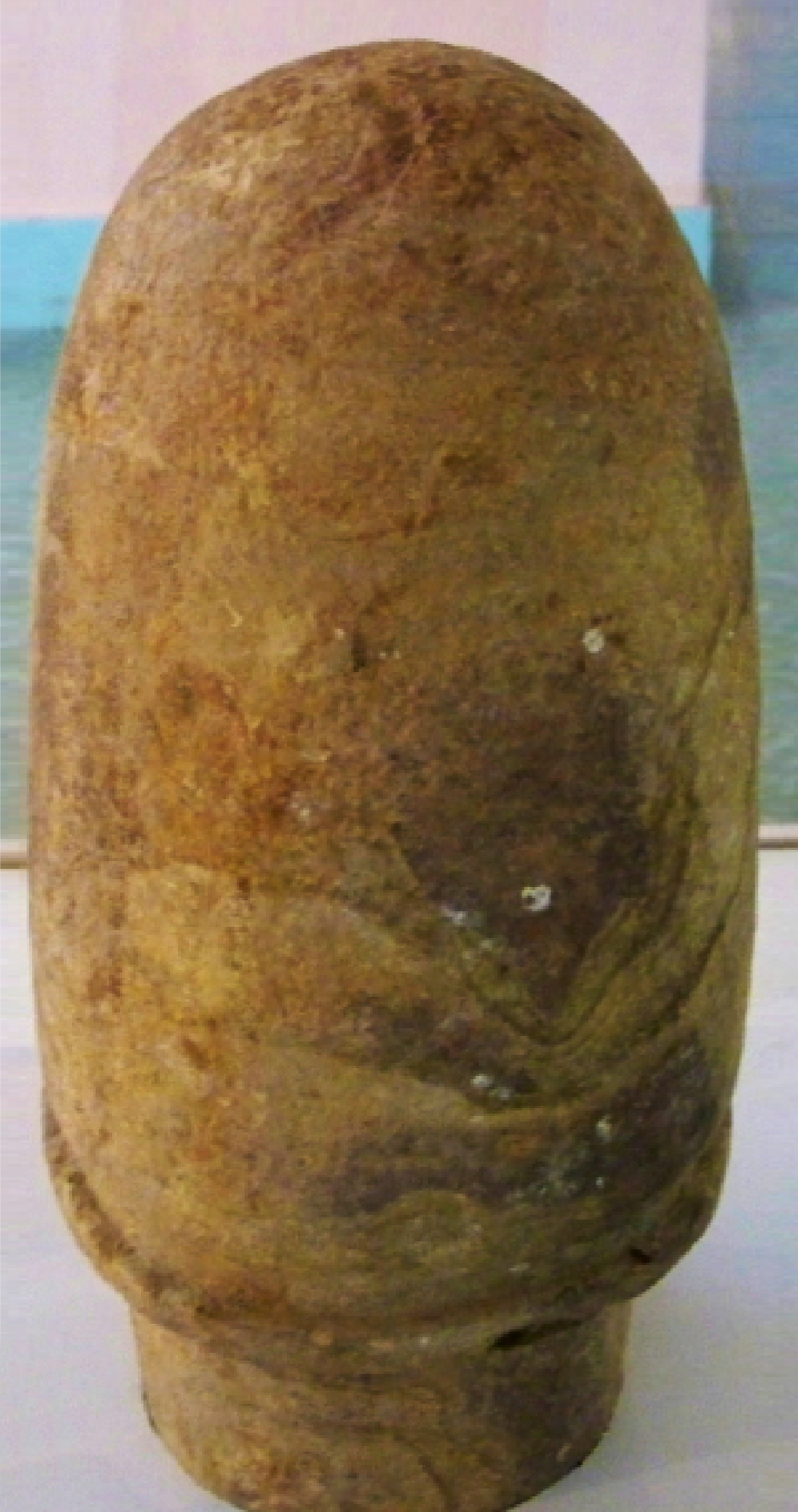
A hypothetical lingam from Mohenjo Daro

Marshall proposed certain ovular limestone stones to be the symbolic representation of yonis, thus drawing links to the cult of phallic worship in Hinduism. Mackay, in his summary reports, rejected Marshall's view: they were architectural stones, probably from a stone pillar. Despite this, Marshall's hypothesis went on to propagate in mainstream scholarship notwithstanding multiple critiques. Modern scholars have come to largely reject the hypothesis.

George F. Dales chose to outright reject the hypothesis about sexual aspects in Harappan religion — if such stones served cultic functions, they would be spread over all Harappan sites and Marshall's findings were untenable on an overall review of excavation finds — and Srinivasan as well as Asko Parpola agreed with his specific rebuttals; yet in light of other evidence, Parpola cautioned against ruling out Marshall's broader hypothesis in totality. Later excavations have since vindicated Mackay's assumptions. Dilip Chakrabarti continue to support Marshall's identification.

==== Lingams ====
To a similar effect, Marshall argued certain cone/dome-shaped stone-pieces to be abstract representations of lingams, as seen in modern-day Hinduism. Despite significant critiques, Marshall's view had propagated into scholarship.

H. D. Sankalia rejected these identifications, too; he raised the issue of these stones being typically found in streets and drains, which ought not house objects with a sacred connotation. Srinivasan rejected Marshall's arguments, as well: (a) the more old a linga was, the more realistic (and non-abstract) was its appearance thus contradicting presentation expected from Harappan era, and (b) the sculpts of ancient lingams are found in the Brahminical heartland of India but not in IVC/post-IVC sites.

== Mesopotamian parallels ==
"Master of Animals" and
"Bull-man fighting beast"

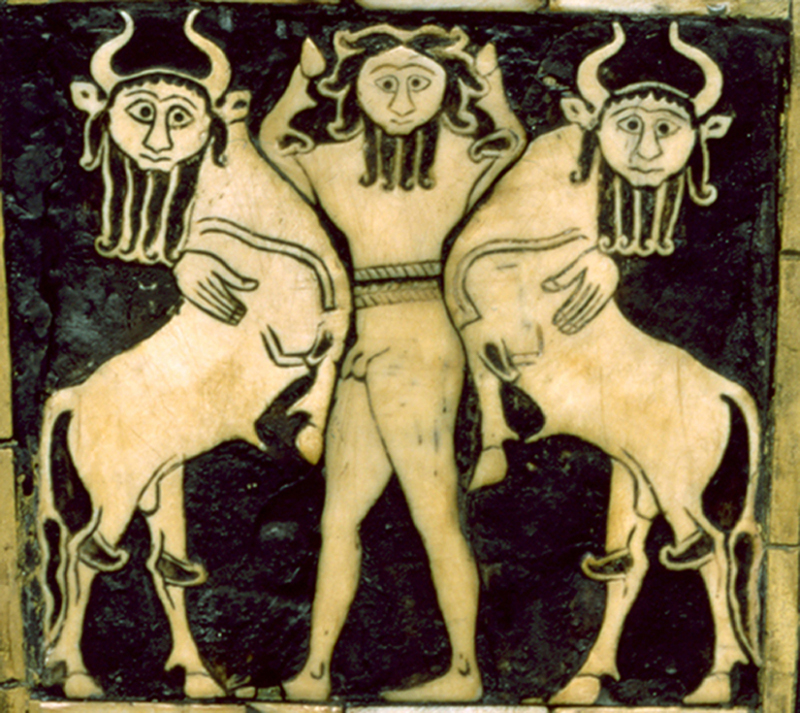
Uruk period Master of Animals, from the harp found at Ur, dated circa 2600 BCE

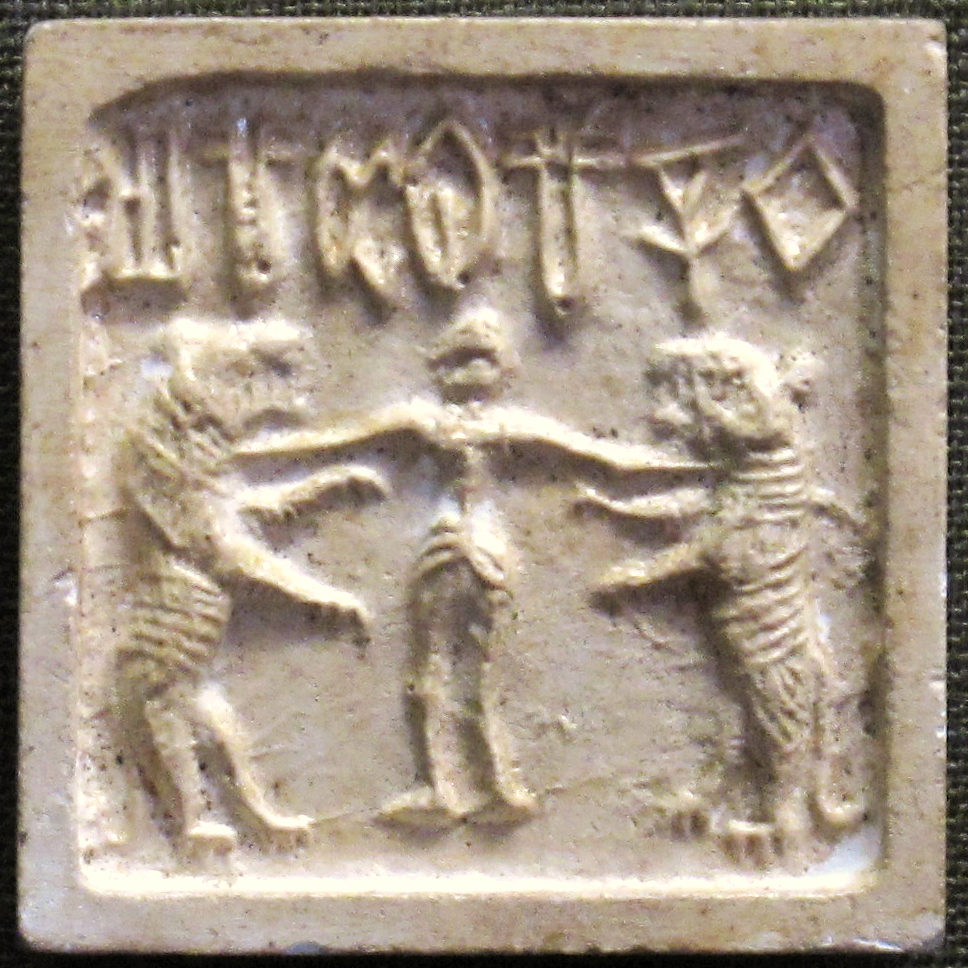
Indus Valley Civilisation seal, with man fighting two tigers (2500-1500 BCE).

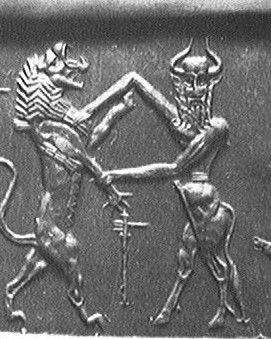
Enkidu, with horns, hooves and tail, fighting a lion. Akkadian Empire seal, Mesopotamia, circa 2200 BCE.

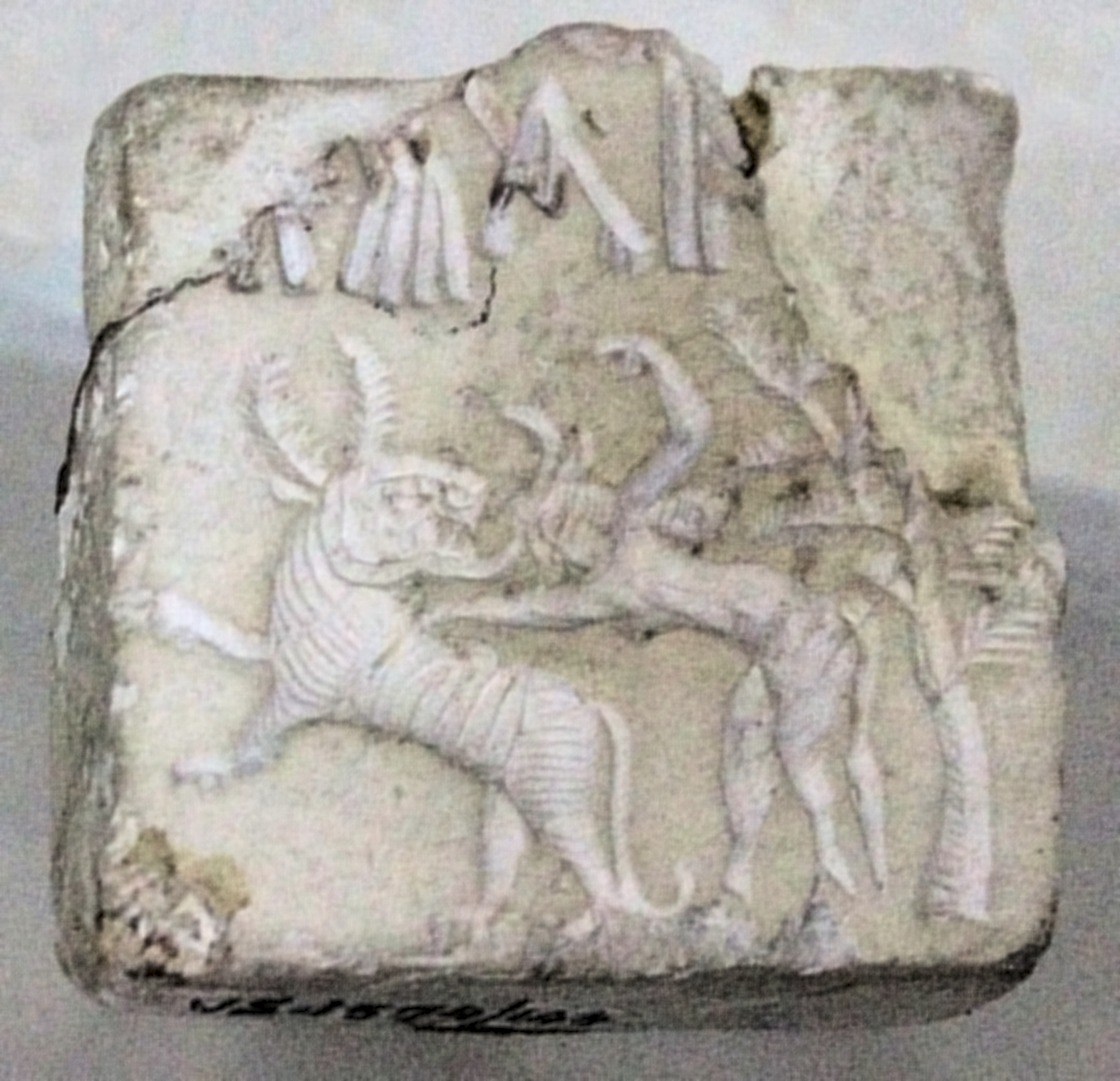
Man with horns, hooves and tail, fighting a beast. He has been compared to the Mesopotamian bull-man Enkidu. Indus Valley civilization seal.

Various authors have described parallels between the religious iconography of Mesopotamia and the depictions on the seals of the Indus Valley civilizations.

Gregory Possehl notes "Mesopotamian themes in Indus iconography", particularly designs related to the Gilgamesh epic, suggesting that "some aspects of Mesopotamian religion and ideology would have been accepted at face value is a reasonable notion". Some Indus seals have a "Gilgamesh" motif of a man fighting two lions, well known in West Asia as the Master of Animals motif (2500-1500 BCE).

Several Indus Valley seals also show a fighting scene between a tiger-like beast and a man with horns, hooves and a tail, who has been compared to the Mesopotamian bull-man Enkidu, also a partner of Gilgamesh, and suggests a transmission of Mesopotamian mythology.

Other seals of the Indus Valley Civilisation, which appear to depict horned deities in ceremonial scenes, seem to have iconographical parallels in the horned deities, priest and royal figures of Mesopotamia, who used to wear horned crowns.

These shared designs may point to a "common stratum of tradition between Mesopotamia and India".

== See also ==
- Indus Valley Civilisation
- History of Hinduism
- History of India
- History of Pakistan

== Sources ==
- Aruz, Joan (ed), Art of the First Cities: The Third Millennium B.C. from the Mediterranean to the Indus, p. 404 (quoted) and 390 (terracotta), 2003, Metropolitan Museum of Art (New York, N.Y.), google books, catalogue entry by Kenoyer, J.M.
- Coningham, Robin; Young, Ruth (2015). Archaeology of South Asia: From the Indus to Asoka, c.6500 BCE–200 CE. Cambridge University Press.
- Flood, Gavin (1996). An Introduction to Hinduism. Cambridge: Cambridge University Press. ISBN 0-521-43878-0.
- Flood, Gavin, ed. (2003). The Blackwell Companion to Hinduism. Malden, Massachusetts: Blackwell. ISBN 1-4051-3251-5.
- Giosan L, Clift PD, Macklin MG, Fuller DQ, et al. (2012). "Fluvial landscapes of the Harappan civilization". Proceedings of the National Academy of Sciences. 109 (26): E1688–E1694. Bibcode:2012PNAS..109E1688G. doi:10.1073/pnas.1112743109. ISSN 0027-8424. PMC 3387054. PMID 22645375.
- Kenoyer, Jonathan Mark (2014). "The Indus Civilization". In Colin Renfrew; Paul Bahn (eds.). The Cambridge World Prehistory. Vol. 1. Cambridge University Press. ISBN 9781107647756.
- Marshall, John, ed. (1931). Mohenjo-Daro and the Indus Civilization: Being an Official Account of Archaeological Excavations at Mohenjo-Daro Carried Out by the Government of India Between the Years 1922 and 1927. London: Arthur Probsthain.
- Parpola, Asko (2015-07-15). The Roots of Hinduism: The Early Aryans and the Indus Civilization. Oxford University Press. ISBN 978-0-19-022693-0.
- Possehl, Gregory L. (2002). The Indus Civilization: A Contemporary Perspective. Rowman Altamira. ISBN 978-0-7591-1642-9.
- Ratnagar, Shereen (April 2004). "Archaeology at the Heart of a Political Confrontation The Case of Ayodhya" (PDF). Current Anthropology. 45 (2): 239–259. doi:10.1086/381044. JSTOR 10.1086/381044. S2CID 149773944.
- Sullivan, Herbert P. (1964). "A Re-Examination of the Religion of the Indus Civilization". History of Religions. 4 (1): 115–125. doi:10.1086/462498. JSTOR 1061875. S2CID 162278147.
- Thapar, Romila (2004). History of Early India: From the Origins to AD 1300. University of California Press. ISBN 0520242254.
- Werness, Hope B. (2006). Continuum Encyclopedia of Animal Symbolism in World Art. A&C Black. p. 270. ISBN 978-0826419132.
- Witzel, Michael (2008). "Vedas and Upanisads". In Gavin Flood (ed.). The Blackwell Companion to Hinduism. John Wiley & Sons. pp. 68–70. ISBN 978-0-470-99868-7.
- Wright, Rita P. (2009). The Ancient Indus: Urbanism, Economy, and Society. Cambridge University Press. ISBN 978-0-521-57219-4.
- Hiltebeitel, Alf (1989). "Hinduism". In Kitagawa, Joseph (ed.). The Religious Traditions of Asia: Religion, History, and Culture. Routledge. ISBN 978-1-136-87590-8.
