= Babor =

Babor may refer to:

== Places ==
- Babor Mountains
- Babor District, Algeria
- Babor, Sétif
- Djebel Babor Nature Reserve

== People ==
- Karl Babor (died 1964), Nazi SS doctor of the German Third Reich
- Kirstie Joan Babor, Philippine fashion model
- Valentina Babor (born 1989), German classical pianist

== Other ==
- An alternate spelling of Bobole, a Coahuiltecan tribe

== See also ==
- Babar (disambiguation)
- Babur (disambiguation)
