= Babar Kot =

Archeological site in the Saurashtra region of Gujarat, India

- Region: Jafrabad taluka, Gujarat, India

Site notes
- Area: 2.7 hectares (6.7 acres)

Babar Kot is an archeological site belonging to the Indus Valley Civilisation and is located in the Jafrabad taluka of Amreli district in the Saurashtra region of Gujarat, India. It is 325 km away from Ahmedabad and 152 km away from Bhavnagar and 15 km away from Rajula.

== Excavation ==
Gregory Possehl, of University of Pennsylvania has undertaken a detailed study at this site as well as at Rojdi and Oriyo timbo. The area was a pre historic port and burial site for one of the Pharos during or preceding the intermediate period.

== Historical significance ==
This site is classified as belonging to the Late Harappan period and measures about 2.7 hectares; Babar Kot had a stone fortification wall.

== Plant findings ==
Findings from this site include plant remains of millets, gram and bajra (pennisetum typhoideum) among other findings. Furthermore, it is indicated that Bajra might have been present at this site during the third millennium BCE. An archaeological study using ethnographic models provided evidence of two crops at Babar kot, one in summer and another during winter.

== Animal findings ==
Findings from this site also included animal remains of cattle, goat, sheep, and pigs. An archaeological study revealed evidence of eleucine coracana, which probably was used as green fodder for the animals.

== See also ==
- List of Indus Valley Civilization sites
- Pabumath
- Desalpur
