= Babra =

Babra may refer to the following places and jurisdictions :

- Babra, Gujarat, western India
- Babra, Numidia, an ancient city and former bishopric, now a Latin Catholic titular see
- Babrra, a ground in the Charsadda District of Khyber Pakhtunkhwa province, Pakistan, which was the site of the Babrra massacre on August 12, 1948
