= Babbar =

Babbar may refer to:

- Babbar (tribe), a Baloch tribe
- Babbar Patera, a crater on Jupiter's moon Io
- BABBAR (silver cuneiform)
- Babbar Subhash, Indian film director
- Aarya Babbar, Indian actor, son of Raj and Nadira Babbar
- Juhi Babbar, Indian actress, daughter of Raj and Nadira Babbar
- Nadira Babbar, Indian theatre actress and director
- Prateik Babbar (born 1986), Indian actor, son of Raj Babbar and Smita Patil
- Raj Babbar (born 1952), Indian actor and politician

== See also ==
- Babar (disambiguation)
- Babbar Akali movement, a group of militant Sikhs in 1921 who broke away from the non-violent mainstream Akali movement
- Babbar Khalsa or Babbar Khalsa International (BKI), a Sikh militant organisation in India
