= Babar, Algeria =

Babar بابار
- Municipality
- Commune of Babar
- Location of Babar, Algeria within Khenchela Province

- Location of Babar within Algeria
- Coordinates: 35.1691777°N 7.1012878°E
- Country: Algeria
- Province: Khenchela
- District: Babar (coextensive)

Government
  - PMA Seats: 11

Area
  - Total: 4,037 km^{2} (1,559 sq mi)
- Elevation: 1,207 m (3,960 ft)

Population (1998)
  - Total: 28,182
  - Density: 6.981/km^{2} (18.08/sq mi)
- Time zone: UTC+01 (CET)
- Postal code: 40340
- ONS code: 4013

See Babar and Babra for namesakes

Babar is a municipality in Khenchela Province, northeastern Algeria. As Ancient Babra, a former bishopric, it remains a Latin Catholic titular see.

== Name ==
Babar ( ) is Amazigh (the Hamitic language of the Berbers), meaning the Lion's Master, from Bab 'master' (=chaoui) and Ar 'Lion'. It is the opening to the Berberian lion's Atlas range territory, to Sheshar (Chechar) and Seiar (Seïar).

== Modern Babar ==
The municipality is coextensive with Babar district and has a population of 28,182, which gives it 11 seats in the PMA. Its postal code is 40340 and its municipal code is 4013.

== History ==
Babra was among the many town important enough in the Roman province of Numidia to become a suffragan diocese in the papal sway.

Its only historically certain incumbent was Victorinus Babrensis, on the list of Catholic bishops attending the Council called at Carthage in 484 by king Huneric of the Vandal Kingdom, annotated in Latin "prbt" (peribat), indicating he died shortly afterwards, perhaps in (or before he could be sent in) exile, as most opponents of the heresy Donatism were.

Morcelli also counts as incumbent of Babra Petrus (AD 592), which other authors hold to have been bishop of Barica, another Numidian see.

== Titular see ==
The diocese was nominally restored in 1933 as Latin Titular bishopric of Babra (Latin = Curiate Italian) / Babren(sis) (Latin adjective).

It has had the following incumbents, so far of the fitting Episcopal (lowest) rank :

- Giustino Giulio Pastorino, Friars Minor (O.F.M.) (Italian) (1965.01.11 – death 2005.04.26) as Apostolic Vicar of Benghazi (Libya) (1965.01.11 – retired 1997.03.10) and Apostolic Administrator of Apostolic Vicariate of Derna (Libya) (1966 – 1978)
- Barry Alexander Anthony Wood, Missionary Oblates of Mary Immaculate (O.M.I.) (2005.10.10 – ...), Auxiliary Bishop of Archdiocese of Durban (South Africa) (2005.10.10 – ...).

== See also ==
- List of Catholic dioceses in Algeria

== Sources and external links ==
- GCatholic - (former &) titular bishopric

Bibliography - ecclesiastical history

- Pius Bonifacius Gams, Series episcoporum Ecclesiae Catholicae, Leipzig 1931, p. 464
- Stefano Antonio Morcelli, Africa christiana, Volume I, Brescia 1816, p. 90
- Auguste Audollent, v. 'Babrensis' in Dictionnaire d'Histoire et de Géographie ecclésiastiques, vol. VI, 1932, coll. 1042–1043
- Patrologia Latina, Vol. LVIII, coll. 271 & 307
