= Pallaseidae =

Scientific classification
- Kingdom: Animalia
- Phylum: Arthropoda
- Class: Malacostraca
- Order: Amphipoda
- Suborder: Senticaudata
- Infraorder: Gammarida
- Parvorder: Gammaridira
- Superfamily: Gammaroidea
- Family: Pallaseidae; Tachteew, 2000

Family of crustaceans

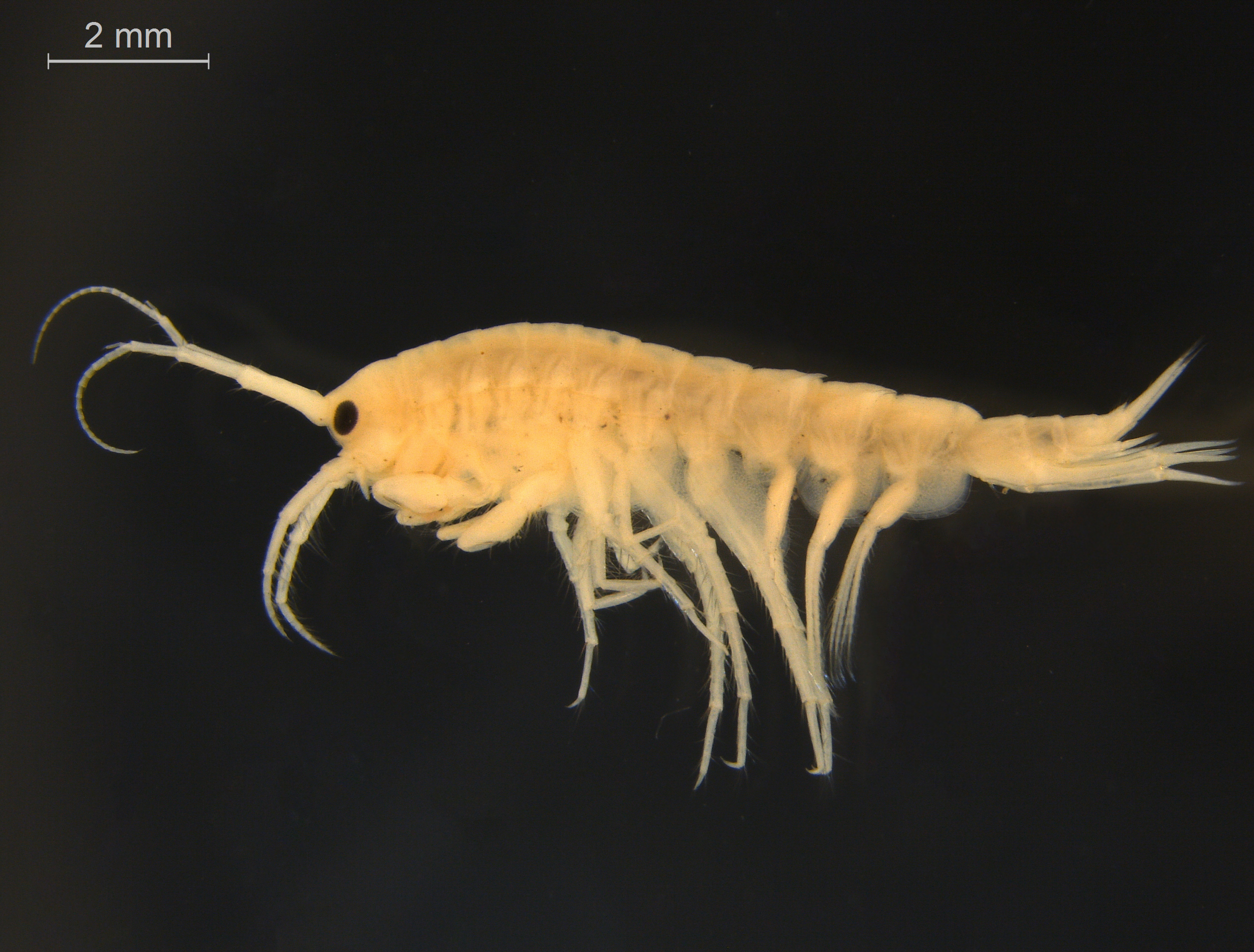
Pallasiola quadrispinosa

Pallaseidae (from the genus name Pallasea) is a family of amphipod crustaceans endemic to Lake Baikal. Some species are also found in the Angara River which flows out of Lake Baikal, and one species is distributed throughout Northern Palearctic. The composition of the family is a subject of discussion, with different sources listing either 9 genera and 58 species, or 8 genera and 20 species. They are benthic, nectobenthic or epibiotic.

The following genera are placed in the family Pallaseidae:

- Babr Kamaltynov & Väinölä, 2001
- Burchania Tachteew, 2000
- Hakonboeckia Stebbing, 1899
- Homalogammarus Bazikalova, 1945
- Pallasea Bate, 1862
- Pallaseopsis Kamaltynov & Väinölä, 2001
- Pentagonurus Sowinsky, 1915
- Propachygammarus Bazikalova, 1945
