= Pallasea =

Scientific classification
- Kingdom: Animalia
- Phylum: Arthropoda
- Class: Malacostraca
- Order: Amphipoda
- Family: Pallaseidae
- Genus: Pallasea; Spence Bate, 1863

Genus of crustaceans

Pallasea is a genus of amphipod crustaceans in the family Pallaseidae.

== Species ==
Currently the species in the genus only comprise three taxa from Lake Baikal and the Angara river downstream:

- Pallasea angarensis Dorogostaisky, 1917
- Pallasea cancellus (Pallas, 1772)
- Pallasea gerstfeldtii (Dybowsky, 1874)

The concept of the genus was previously wider, comprising also species in the current genera Homalogammarus, Pentagonurus, Babr and Pallaseopsis.
