= PNS Babur =

PNS Babur may refer to one of these ships of the Pakistan Navy:

- PNS Babur (1956), the former HMS Diadem (84), a Dido-class cruiser of the Royal Navy; sold to Pakistan in 1956 and used as a training ship in 1961 until returning to service in 1963.
- PNS Babur (1982), the former HMS London (D16), a County-class destroyer of the Royal Navy; sold to Pakistan in 1982; decommissioned in 1993 and sold for scrap in 1995
- PNS Babur (1993), the former HMS Amazon (F169), a Type 21 frigate of the Royal Navy launched in 1971; sold to Pakistan in 1993; decommissioned in 2014.
- PNS Babur (F-280), a PN MILGEM-class corvette of the Pakistan Navy launched in 2021.
