= Pabumath =

- Archaeological site
- Location within India
- Coordinates: 23°37′N 70°31′E
- Country: India
- Province: Gujarath
- District: Kutch
- Taluka: Nakhtrana
- Time zone: UTC+5.30 (Indian Standard Time)

Pabumath is an Indus Valley Civilisation archaeological site near Suvai village in Rapar Taluka of Kutch district, Gujarat, India.

== Excavation ==
The Archaeological Survey of India excavated the site in 1977–78, 1978–79, and 1980-81.

== Findings ==
A large building complex was discovered during the 1980-81 excavations, along with artifacts that included a unicorn seal, shell bangles, beads, copper bangles, needles, antimony rods, steatite micro beads; pottery including large and medium size jars, beaker, dishes, dish-on-stand, perforated jars, and more; and fine red pottery with black painted designs. Animal remains of cattle, buffalo, fish, sheep, wild pig and rabbits were also found.

== Other observations ==
This site is in Kutch district, where several other IVC sites such as Dholavira, Desalpur, Surkotada etc. are located. Evidence of fortification was found at this site as well as at Desalpur, Netra-Khissar, Surkotada, Dholavira, Kotada, Meghpar, Sevakia, Chitrod, Kanmer etc. which are nearby IVC sites.

== See also ==
- List of Indus Valley Civilization sites
- Shikarpur, Gujarat
- Kerala-no-dhoro
- Desalpur
- Babar Kot
