= Karl Babor =

Austrian concentration camp physician (1918–1964)

Karl Babor (23 August 1918 – 18 January 1964) was an Austrian Nazi, SS doctor of the Third Reich, and officer at Camp Gross-Rosen with the rank of Hauptsturmführer. He was an expert in assassination by syringe of phenol.

== Biography ==
In 1945, Babor was arrested and taken prisoner by the French, and spent several months in a camp before being returned to Vienna, Austria. He finished his studies without being arrested until 1952, when he was identified by former deportees at Gross-Rosen. He fled from Vienna and Austria, and was later found in Ethiopia. In the meantime, his wife returned to Germany and denounced him. She contacted Simon Wiesenthal, who alerted the world press (in 1963).

Babor died without being found: his body was recovered in January 1964 from a river infested with crocodiles. Police found that he had a self-inflicted gunshot wound to his head.
