= Jafrabad taluka =

Taluka in Gujarat, India

Jafrabad Taluka
- Taluka of Gujarat
- Interactive map of Jafrabad Taluka
- Coordinates: 20°53′39″N 71°20′08″E
- Country: India
- State: Gujarat
- District: Amreli
- Headquarters: Jafrabad

Population (2011)
  - Total: 108,002
  - Sex ratio: 955 ♂/♀
  - Literacy: 51.8%

Languages
  - Official: Gujarati, Hindi
- Time zone: UTC+5:30 (IST)
- Telephone code: +91-079
- Vehicle registration: GJ

Jafrabad Taluka is a geographical subdivision located in the Amreli district of the state of Gujarat, India. It is situated in the western part of the country and falls within the Saurashtra region. Jafrabad is the headquarters of the taluka.

== Demographics ==
According to Census 2011 Jafrabad Sub-District, with a total of 19,475 households, is home to a population of 108,002 individuals, comprising 55,238 males and 52,764 females. Among its residents, 15,584 are children, with 8,123 being boys and 7,461 girls. The sub-district has a notable presence of Scheduled Castes, with 6,808 members, consisting of 3,509 males and 3,299 females. Additionally, there are 286 Scheduled Tribe individuals, including 149 males and 137 females. Educationally, Jafrabad displays a relatively literate population, with 55,980 people being literate, of which 34,081 are males and 21,899 are females. Conversely, 52,022 individuals are illiterate, with 21,157 being males and 30,865 females. The sub-district's workforce consists of 47,559 individuals, with 30,672 males and 16,887 females engaged in various economic activities, while 60,443 people are categorized as non-workers.
