= Babar Pur =

- city
- Location in Delhi, India
- Coordinates: 28.68773°N 77.28044°E
- Country: India
- State: Delhi
- District: North East

Population (2001)
  - Total: 43,364

Languages
  - Official: Hindi, English
- Time zone: UTC+5:30 (IST)

Babar Pur is a census town in North East district in the state of Delhi, India.

== Demographics ==
As of 2001 India census, Babar Pur had a population of 43,364. Males constitute 54% of the population and females 46%. Babar Pur has an average literacy rate of 66%, higher than the national average of 59.5%; with 59% of the males and 41% of females literate. 16% of the population is under 6 years of age.
