= Gregory Possehl =

Professor of anthropology (1941–2011)

Gregory Louis Possehl (July 21, 1941 – October 8, 2011) was a professor emeritus of anthropology at the University of Pennsylvania, United States, and curator of the Asian Collections at the University of Pennsylvania Museum of Archaeology and Anthropology. He was involved in excavations of the Indus Valley civilization in India and Pakistan since 1964, and was the author of many books and articles on the Indus Civilization and related topics.

Possehl received his BA in anthropology from the University of Washington in 1964, his MA in anthropology from the University of Washington in 1967, and his PhD in anthropology from the University of Chicago in 1974. He conducted major excavations in Gujarat (Rojdi, Babar Kot and Oriyo Timbo), Rajasthan (Gilund), and in January 2007, began an excavation at the UNESCO World Heritage site of Bat in the Sultanate of Oman.

He believed that parts of Indus Valley Civilization culture survived into later periods. In his book Ancient Cities of the Indus he wrote that "the first point to be emphasized is that the problem seems not to be best stated as the "end" of a civilization, at least in the sense of a tradition, since there are abundant signs of cultural continuity in Sindh, Gujarat, the Punjab and adjacent areas of the North India." Still, Possehl endorsed the Aryan migration theory and viewed Vedic culture and the Indus Civilization as distinct.

== Articles ==
His works include:

- Possehl, Gregory L., 1967. The Mohenjo-daro floods: A reply. American Anthropologist 69: 32–40.
- Possehl, Gregory L., 1974. Variation and change in the Indus Civilization: A study of prehistoric Gujarat with special reference to the post-urban Harappan. Unpublished Ph.D. dissertation, The University of Chicago. x, 302 pp., ill. Revised version published in 1980 as "Indus Civilization in Saurashtra".
- Dhavalikar, M. K., and Gregory L. Possehl, 1974. Subsistence pattern of an early farming community of western India. Puratattva (Bulletin of the Indian Archaeological Society) 7: 39–46.
- Possehl, Gregory L., 1975. The chronology of gabarbands and palas in western South Asia. Expedition 17 (2): 33–37.
- Kennedy, Kenneth A.R., and Gregory L. Possehl (eds.), 1976. Ecological backgrounds of South Asian prehistory. Symposium convened at the seventy-second annual meeting of the American Anthropological Association, December 2, 1973, New Orleans. (South Asia Occasional Papers and Theses, 4.) Ithaca NY: South Asia Program, Cornell University. 28 cm, vi, 236 pp., ill., maps. Pb
- Possehl, Gregory L., 1976. Lothal: A gateway settlement of the Harappan Civilization. pp. 198–131 in: Kennedy, Kenneth A. R., and Gregory L. Possehl (eds.), Ecological backgrounds of South Asian prehistory. (South Asia Occasional Papers and Theses, 4.) Ithaca: South Asia Program, Cornell University. Reprinted, pp. 212–218 in: Possehl, Gregory L. (ed.) 1979. Ancient cities of the Indus. New Delhi.
- Possehl, Gregory L., 1977. The end of a state and continuity of a tradition: A discussion of the Late Harappan. pp. 234–254 in: Fox, Richard G. (ed.), Realm and region in traditional India. New Delhi: Vikas Publishing House Pvt. Ltd.
- Possehl, Gregory L. (ed.) 1979. ANCIENT CITIES OF THE INDUS. Durham NC: Carolina Academic Press & New Delhi: Vikas Publishing House Pvt. Ltd. 27 cm, xv, 422 pp., 8 pl., ill. Hb ISBN 0-89089-093-5 & 0-7069-0781-7.
- Possehl, Gregory L., 1979. Introduction. Pp. vii-xv in: Possehl, Gregory L. (ed.), Ancient cities of the Indus.
- Possehl, Gregory L., 1979. Radiocarbon dates for the Indus Civilization and related sites. pp. 358–360 in: Possehl, Gregory L. (ed.), Ancient cities of the Indus.
- Possehl, Gregory L., 1979. An extensive bibliography of the Indus Civilization including references cited in the text. pp. 361–422 in: Possehl, Gregory L., 1979. (ed.) Ancient cities of the Indus.
- Possehl, Gregory L., 1979. Pastoral nomadism in the Indus Civilization: An hypothesis. pp. 537–551 in: Taddei, Maurizio (ed.), South Asian Archaeology 1977, vol. I. (Istituto Universitario Orientale, Seminario di Studi Asiatici, Series minor, 6: I.) Naples: Istituto Universitario Orientale, Seminario di Studi Asiatici.
- Possehl, Gregory L., and Kenneth A. R. Kennedy, 1979. Hunter-gatherer/agriculturalist exchange in prehistory: An Indian example. Current Anthropology 20 (3): 592–593.
- Possehl, Gregory L., 1980. INDUS CIVILIZATION IN SAURASHTRA. New Delhi: Published on behalf of Indian Archaeological Society by B.R. Publishing Corporation. 29 cm, xvi, 264 pp., ill., maps. Hb [Revised version of the author's Ph.D. dissertation, The University of Chicago, 1974.]
- Possehl, Gregory L., 1981. Cambay bead-making: An ancient craft in modern India. Expedition 23 (4): 39–46.
- Possehl, Gregory L. (ed.) 1982. HARAPPAN CIVILIZATION: A CONTEMPORARY PERSPECTIVE. New Delhi: Oxford & IBH Publishing Co. Pvt. Ltd. and American Institute of Indian Studies; Warminster: Aris & Phillips in cooperation with American Institute of Indian Studies. 28 cm xiii, 440 pp., 93 pl., maps. Hb
- Possehl, Gregory L., 1982. The Harappan Civilization: A contemporary perspective. pp. 15–28 in: Possehl, Gregory L. (ed.), Harappan Civilization: A contemporary perspective.
- Possehl, Gregory L., 1982. Discovering ancient India's earliest cities: The first phase of research. pp. 405–413 in: Possehl, Gregory L. (ed.), Harappan Civilization: A contemporary perspective.
- Possehl. Gregory L., 1984. Archaeological terminology and the Harappan Civilization. pp. 27–36 in: Lal, B.B., and S.P. Gupta (eds.), Frontiers of the Indus Civilization: Sir Mortimer Wheeler Commemoration Volume. New Delhi:

Indian Archaeological Society.

- Kennedy, Kenneth A. R., and Gregory L. Possehl (eds.) 1984. STUDIES IN THE ARCHAEOLOGY AND PALAEOANTHROPOLOGY OF SOUTH ASIA. New Delhi: Oxford & IBH Publishing Co. Pvt. Ltd. and American Institute of Indian Studies. 25 cm, viii, 144 pp., ill., maps.
- Lyons, Elizabeth, and Heather Peters, 1985. Buddhism: History and diversity of a great tradition. With contributions by Chang Ch'eng-mei & Gregory L. Possehl. Philadelphia: University Museum, University of Pennsylvania. 28 cm, 64 pp., ill., map. ISBN 0-934718-76-8.
- Possehl, Gregory L., 1986. KULLI: AN EXPLORATION OF AN ANCIENT CIVILIZATION IN SOUTH ASIA. (Centers of Civilization, 1.) Durham, NC: Carolina Academic Press. 29 cm, viii, 168 pp., ill. Hb ISBN 0-89089-173-7.

Possehl, Gregory L., 1986. African millets in South Asian prehistory. pp. 237–256 in: Jerome Jacobson (ed.), Studies in the archaeology of India and Pakistan. New Delhi: Oxford & IBH Publishing Co. Pvt. Ltd. and American Institute of Indian Studies.

Possehl, Gregory L., 1987–1988. Indian Archaeology, A Review: Guide to excavated sites 1953–54 through 1983–84. Puratattva (Bulletin of the Indian Archaeological Society) 18: 113–172.

Possehl, Gregory L., 1989. RADIOCARBON DATES FOR SOUTH ASIAN ARCHAEOLOGY. (Occasional publication of the Asian Section.) Philadelphia: University Museum, University of Pennsylvania. 28 cm. 60 pp.

Possehl, Gregory L., and M. H. Raval, 1989. HARAPPAN CIVILIZATION AND ROJDI. With contributions from Y. M. Chitalwala et al. Leiden and New York: E. J. Brill; New Delhi: Oxford & IBH Publishing Co. Pvt. Ltd. and American Institute of Indian Studies. 29 cm, xv, 197 pp., 46 pl., 80 ill., 5 maps. ISBN 90-04-09157-2 & 81-204-0404-1.

Possehl, Gregory L., 1990. Revolution in the urban revolution: The emergence of Indus urbanization. Annual Review of Anthropology 19: 261–282.

Possehl. Gregory L., 1990. An archaeological adventurer in Afghanistan: Charles Masson. South Asian Studies 6: 111–124.

Possehl, Gregory L., and Charles Frank Herman, 1990. The Sorath Harappan: A new regional manifestation of the Indus urban phase. pp. 295–319 in: Taddei, Maurizio, with P. Callieri (ed.), South Asian Archaeology 1987, vol. I. (Serie Orientale Roma 66: I.) Roma: Istituto per il Medio ed Estremo Oriente.

Rissman, Paul C., and Y. M. Chitalwala, 1990. Harappan Civilization and Oriyo Timbo. With contributions from Gregory L. Possehl et al. New Delhi: Oxford & IBH Publishing Co. Pvt. Ltd. and American Institute of Indian Studies. 25 cm, xi, 155 pp., ill. ISBN 81-204-0484-X.

Possehl, Gregory L., and Kenneth A. R. Kennedy, 1990. Hasmukh Dhirajlal Sankalia (1908–1989). American Anthropologist 92: 1006–1010.

Possehl, Gregory L., and M.H. Raval, 1991. A report on the excavations at Babar Kot: 1990–91. S.l. 16 p. Submitted to the ASI.

Possehl, Gregory L., and Paul C. Rissman, 1992. The chronology of prehistoric India: From earliest times to the Iron Age. pp. 465–490 in vol. I and pp. 447–474 (Fig. 1–13, tables 1–14 and References) in vol. II of: Ehrich, Robert W. (ed.), Chronologies in Old World archaeology, 3rd ed. Chicago: The University of Chicago Press.

Possehl, Gregory L., 1992. The Harappan cultural mosaic: Ecology revisited. pp. 237–244 in vol. I of: Jarrige, Catherine (ed.), South Asian Archaeology 1989. (Monographs in World Archaeology, 14.) Madison WI: Prehistory Press.

Possehl, Gregory L., 1992. The Harappan Civilization in Gujarat: The Sorath and Sindhi Harappans. The Eastern Anthropologist 45 (1–2): 117–154.

Possehl, Gregory L., 1992. A short history of archaeological discovery at Harappa. In: Meadow 1992a: 5–11.

Possehl, Gregory L. (ed.) 1992. SOUTH ASIAN ARCHAEOLOGY STUDIES. New Delhi: Oxford & IBH Publishing Co. Pvt. Ltd. and American Institute of Indian Studies; New York: International Science Publisher (1993). 24 cm, x, 266 pp., ill., map. Hb ISBN 81-204-0734-2 & 1881570177.

Possehl, Gregory L., 1992. Walter Ashlin Fairservis, Jr. pp. 1–12 in: Possehl, Gregory L. (ed.), South Asian archaeology studies.

Possehl, Gregory L., 1992. Toymakers and trade: A notice of early twentieth century commerce between Philadelphia and India. pp. 261–266 in: Possehl, Gregory L. (ed.), South Asian archaeology studies.

Possehl, Gregory L. (ed.) 1993. HARAPPAN CIVILIZATION: A RECENT PERSPECTIVE. 2nd revised ed. New Delhi: Oxford & IBH Publishing Co. Pvt. Ltd. an American Institute of Indian Studies. 28 cm, xv, 595 pp., 120 pl., maps, index. Hb ISBN 81-204-0779-2.

Possehl, Gregory L., 1993. The date of Indus urbanization: A proposed chronology for the Pre-Urban and Urban Harappan phases. pp. 231–249 in: Gail, Adalbert J., and G. R. Mevissen (eds.), South Asian Archaeology 1991. Stuttgart: Franz Steiner Verlag.

Possehl, Gregory L., and Maurizio Tosi (eds.) 1993. HARAPPAN STUDIES, Vol. 1. New Delhi: Oxford & IBH Publishing Co. Pvt. Ltd. 71 pp. Pb INR 395. ISBN 81-204-0819-5.

Possehl, Gregory L., 1994. The Indus Civilisation. Man and Environment 19 (1–2): 103–113.

Possehl, Gregory L., 1994. Of men. pp. 179–186 in: Kenoyer, Jonathan Mark (ed.), From Sumer to Meluhha: Contributions to the archaeology of South and West Asia in memory of George F. Dales, Jr. (Wisconsin Archaeological Reports, 3.) Madison, WI: Department of Anthropology, University of Wisconsin at Madison.

Possehl, Gregory L., 1994. RADIOMETRIC DATES FOR SOUTH ASIAN ARCHAEOLOGY. (An occasional publication of the Asia Section.) Philadelphia: The University of Pennsylvania Museum. 122 pp.

Possehl, Gregory L., and Dinker P. Mehta, 1994. Excavations at Rojdi, 1992–93. pp. 603–614 in: Parpola, Asko, and Petteri Koskikallio (eds.), South Asian Archaeology 1993, vol. II. (Annales Academiae Scientiarum Fennicae B 271: II.) Helsinki: Suomalainen Tiedeakatemia.

Possehl, Gregory L., 1996. Meluhha. pp. 133–208 in: Reade, Julian (ed.), The Indian Ocean in antiquity. London: Kegan Paul International in association with the British Museum.

Possehl, Gregory L., 1996. Climate and the eclipse of the ancient cities of the Indus. pp. 193–244 in: Dalfes, H. Nüzhet, George Kukla and Harvey Weiss (eds.), Third millennium BC climate change and Old World collapse. (NATO ASI, Series 1: Global Environment Change, vol. 49.) Berlin & New York: Springer.

Possehl, Gregory L., 1996. INDUS AGE: THE WRITING SYSTEM. Philadelphia: University of Pennsylvania Press; New Delhi: Oxford IBH Publishing Co. Pvt. Ltd. 29 cm, xiv, 244 pp., 16 pl. Hb ISBN 0-8122-3345-X & 81-204-1083-1.

Possehl, Gregory L., 1997. The transformation of the Indus Civilization. Journal of World Prehistory 11 (4): 425–472. Reprinted in Man and Environment 24 (2), 1999: 1–33.

Possehl, Gregory L., 1997. The date of the Surkotada cemetery: A reassessment in light of recent archaeological work in Gujarat. pp. 81–87 in: Joshi, Jagat Pati (ed.), Facets of Indian Civilization: Recent perspectives. Essays in honour of Professor B. B. Lal. New Delhi: Aryan Books International.

Possehl, Gregory L., 1997. Seafaring merchants of Meluhha. pp. 87–100 in: Allchin, Bridget (ed.), South Asian Archaeology 1995. Cambridge: Ancient India and Iran Trust; New Delhi: Oxford & IBH Publishing Co. Pvt. Ltd.

Possehl, Gregory L., 1997–1998. An Harappan outpost on the Amu Darya: Shortughai, Why was it there? Indologica Taurinensia 23–24: 57–70, 1 fig.

Possehl, Gregory L., 1998. Sociocultural complexity without the state: The Indus Civilization. pp. 261–291 in: Feinman, Gary M., and Joyce Marcus (eds.), The archaic states. Santa Fe, NM: School of American Research.

Possehl, Gregory L., 1998. Did the Sarasvati ever flow to the sea? pp. 339–354 in: Philips, C. S., D. T. Potts and S. Searight (eds.), Arabia and its neighbours: Essays on prehistorical and historical developments presented in honour of Beatric de Cardi. Brussels: Brepols.

Possehl, Gregory L., 1998. Introduction of African millets to the Indian subcontinent. pp. 107–121 in: Pendergast, H. D. V., N. L., Etkin, D. R. Harris and P. J. Houghton (eds.), Plants for food and medicine. Kew: The Royal Botanic Gardens.

Possehl, Gregory L., 1999. INDUS AGE: THE BEGINNINGS. Philadelphia: University of Pennsylvania Press; New Delhi: Oxford & IBH Publishing Co. Pvt. Ltd. 29 cm, xxxvi, 1063 pp., 580 b/w ill. Hb ISBN 0-8122-3417-0. Reviewed: Asko Parpola, The Times Higher Education Supplement, 3 Dec 1999, p. 24.

Possehl, Gregory L., and Praveena Gullapalli, 1999. The Early Iron Age in South Asia. pp. 153–175 in: Pigott, Vincent C. (ed.), The archaeometallurgy of the Asian Old World. (MASCA Research Papers in Science and Archaeology, University Museum Monograph, volume 16.) Philadelphia: The University Museum, University of Pennsylvania.

Possehl, Gregory L., 2000. Harappan beginnings. pp. 99–112 in: Lamberg-Karlovsky, Martha (ed.), The breakout: The origins of civilization. (Peabody Museum Monographs, 9.) Cambridge, MA: Peabody Museum, Harvard University.

Possehl, Gregory L., 2000–2001. The Early Harapopan phase. Bulletin of the Deccan College Post-Graduate and Research Institute 60–61: 227–241, 10 figs.

Possehl, Gregory L., 2000–2001. The Mature Harapopan phase. Bulletin of the Deccan College Post-Graduate and Research Institute 60–61: 243–251, 2 figs.

Possehl, Gregory L., 2002. THE INDUS CIVILIZATION: A CONTEMPORARY PERSPECTIVE. Walnut Creek, CA: AltaMira Press. 29 cm, xi, 276 pp., ill., maps. Pb ISBN 0-7591-0172-8. Hb ISBN 0-7591-0171-X.

Possehl, Gregory L., 2002. Fifty years of Harappan archaeology: The study of the Indus Civilization since Indian independence. pp. 1–46 in: Settar, S., and Ravi Korisettar (eds.), Protohistory: Archaeology of the Harappan Civilization. (Indian archaeology in retrospect, vol. II.) New Delhi: Indian Council of Historical Research & Manohar.

Possehl, Gregory L., 2002. Archaeology of the Harappan Civilization: An annotated list of excavations and surveys. pp. 421–482 in: Settar, S., and Ravi Korisettar (eds.) Protohistory: Archaeology of the Harappan Civilization. (Indian archaeology in retrospect, vol. II.) New Delhi: Indian Council of Historical Research & Manohar.

Possehl, Gregory L., 2002. Indus-Mesopotamian trade: The record in the Indus. Iranica Antiqua 37: 322–340.

Possehl, Gregory L., 2003. The Indus Civilization: An introduction to environment, subsistence, and cultural history. pp. 1–20 in: Weber, Steven A., and William R. Belcher (eds.), Indus ethnobiology: New perspectives from the field. Lanham MD: Lexington Books.

Possehl, G. and M. Witzel. Vedic. In: P.N. Peregrine and M. Ember, eds., Encyclopedia of Prehistory, Volume 8: South and Southwest Asia. Published in conjunction with the Human Relations Area Files at Yale University. Kluwer Academic/Plenum Publishers, New York, 391–396.

Shinde, V., G. L. Possehl and M. Ameri, 2005. Excavations at Gilund 2001–2003: The seal impressions and other finds. pp. 159–169 in: Franke-Vogt, Ute, & Hans-Joachim Weisshaar (eds.), South Asian Archaeology 2003. (Forschungen zur Archäologie aussereuropäischer Kulturen, 1.) Aachen: Linden Soft Verlag e. K.

Possehl, Gregory L., 2007. The Indus Civilization. Chapter 9 in: Hinnells, John R. (ed.), Handbook of ancient religions. Cambridge: Cambridge University Press.

Joshi, Jagat Pati, 2008. Harappan architecture and civil engineering. Foreword by Gregory L. Possehl. (Infinity Foundation series.) New Delhi: Rupa & Co., in association with Infinity Foundation. ISBN 978-81-291-1183-8.

Possehl, Gregory L., 2010. Review of: Parpola, Asko, B. M. Pande and Petteri Koskikallio (eds.), 2010. Corpus of Indus Seals and Inscriptions, Volume 3: New material, untraced objects, and collections outside India and Pakistan. Part 1: Mohenjo-daro and Harappa, in collaboration with Richard H. Meadow and J. Mark Kenoyer. (Annales Academiae Scientiarum Fennicae, Humaniora 359; Memoirs of the Archaeological Survey of India, No. 96.) Helsinki: Suomalainen Tiedeakatemia. Journal of the American Oriental Society 130 (2).

Possehl, Gregory L. (2012). "Indus River". Berkshire Encyclopedia of Sustainability: Afro-Eurasia: Assessing Sustainability. Great Barrington, MA: Berkshire Publishing Group.

== Books ==
- 2002 The Indus Civilization: A contemporary perspective. Walnut Creek: Altamira Press.
- 1999 Indus Age: The beginnings. Philadelphia: University of Pennsylvania Press.
- 1996 Indus Age: The writing system. Philadelphia: University of Pennsylvania Press
- 1993 Harappan Civilization: A recent perspective. 2nd revised edition. Delhi: Oxford & IBH and the American Institute of Indian Studies: edited
- 1989 Harappan Civilization and Rojdi. Delhi: Oxford & IBH and the American Institute of Indian Studies: with M. H. Raval.
- 1986 Kulli: An exploration of ancient civilization in South Asia. Durham: Carolina Academic Press.
- 1979 Ancient Cities of The Indus. Vikas Publishing House.
