= Desalpar Gunthli =

Desalpar Gunthali
- Archaeological site
- Location within India
- Coordinates: 23°11′54″N 69°26′31″E
- Country: India
- Province: Gujarat
- District: Kutch
- Taluka: Nakhtrana
- Time zone: UTC+5.30 (Indian Standard Time)

Desalpar Gunthli is a village and site belonging to Indus Valley Civilisation located at Nakhtrana Taluka, Kutch District, Gujarat, India. Desalpar is approx 25 km away from Bhuj. This site is of modest dimensions,(130 m (427 ft) by 100 m (328 ft)) situated on the northern banks of once depredatory (erosive) stream, Bamu-Chela, an affluent of the Dhrud river.

== History ==
The line of the walls, 2250 yards round and something of an oblong square in shape, though much decayed may be clearly traced. Inside is nothing but a heap of ruins, the remains of houses and temples. In I828, the villagers constantly turned up pieces of old vessels, ass coins, and occasional boxes of money. An old Mahadev temple was believed to hold snake-guarded treasured.

On the bank of a small lake to the west of the fort, seven grave stones, palias, with peculiar designs but no writings, are said to have been raised in honour of seven claimants for the hand of Guntri the adopted sister of the seven Sands, possibly Vaghela Rajputs, once the rulers of the fort. It was from these seven Sands, probably early in the fourteenth century, that the Sammas captured the fort and made themselves masters of western Kutch.

The story is that Mod and Mandi, two Samma outlaws from Sindh, by treachery gained possession of Vagham - Chavdagadh ten miles north of Kora near Lakhpat. Vagham Chavda, whom the Sammas killed, was a vassal of the seven Sands. They at first threatened punishment, but were appeased by the offer of a larger tribute and of one of the Samma brothers as hostage. Part of the tribute was paid in grass, and one year the Sammas, in each cart of grass, hid some armed men. As the carts passed through the city gate, the blind gatekeeper smelling something more than grass, said, "There is either flesh or pulse in the cart?". A spear driven into one cart cut the thigh of a Jat soldier. But he, uttering no sound of pain, as the spear was pulled out rubbed off the blood, and, in spite of the blind man's warning, the carts passed in. At night the armed men left the carts, fell on the garrison, seized the fort, and drove the seven Sands into Kathiawar.

== Excavation ==
Archaeological Survey of India undertook excavation at this site during 1963.

== Architecture ==
Desalpar had a massive stone fortification with a base of about 4 m (13 ft), and height measuring from 2 m (7 ft) to 5 m (16 ft). Several houses were built adjacent to fort wall inside the town and central part of the settlement had a structural complex with foundation offsets, massive walls and spacious rooms.

== Findings ==
Regular Harappan pottery, a thin grey ware carefully potted and painted with lines of bluish green pigment were found at lower excavation levels, similar to that found at Mohenjodaro, which is commonly described as 'glazed ware'. Alongside the Harappan pottery, three scripts bearing seals were found. On each script the seal was made of a different material, one of steatite, one of copper and one of terracotta.

== See also ==
- List of Indus Valley Civilization sites
- Surkotada
- Gola dhoro
- Dholavira
- Pabumath
- Babar Kot
