= Babr =

Scientific classification
- Domain: Eukaryota
- Kingdom: Animalia
- Phylum: Arthropoda
- Class: Malacostraca
- Order: Amphipoda
- Family: Pallaseidae
- Genus: Babr; Kamaltynov & Väinölä, 2002

Genus of crustaceans

Babr is a genus of amphipod crustaceans in the family Pallaseidae, endemic to Lake Baikal. There are 2 species in the genus.

== Taxonomic history ==
Previously the species of this genus were a part of another Baikalian genus Pallasea, which was recently split into several independent genera, including genus Babr.

== Distribution and habitat ==
Babr is endemic to Lake Baikal, inhabiting sandy and sandy-muddy shallows of the lake.

== Morphology ==
Body length ranges from about 2 to 3 centimetres (0.8 to 1.2 in). Typical dark spots and stripes on the body reminded the authors of the genus of a tiger, and the name of the genus is based on an old Siberian name of tiger, "babr". Similar to many other taxa in the family, Babr species have strongly convex oval eyes and lateral prominences on thoracic segments. In comparison with the closely related genus Pallaseopsis the representatives of Babr lack dorso-lateral spines, have longer telson, which is about as long the last abdominal segment, and differ by some additional characters.

== Species ==
Two species are currently recognised in the genus Babr.

- Babr baikali (Stebbing, 1899) (syn. B. inermis (Sowinsky, 1915))
- Babr nigromaculatus (Dorogostaisky, 1922)
