= Rojdi =

Rogadi
- Interactive map of Rogadi
- Type: Settlement
- Cultures: Indus Valley Civilization

Site notes
- Excavation dates: 1982–1995
- Condition: Ruined
- Owner: Public
- Public access: Yes

Rojdi is an archaeological site belonging to the Indus Valley Civilization. It is located on the northern bank of the Bhadar River in Gondal taluka of Rajkot district in central Saurashtra peninsula of Gujarat state in India. It was continuously occupied from 2500 BCE to 1700 BCE.

== Chronology ==
The site was excavated for seven seasons between 1982 and 1995 by the Gujarat State Department of Archaeology and the University Museum at the University of Pennsylvania. The excavation confirmed three periods of occupation, called Rojdi A, B and C. Twenty radiocarbon dates have helped to estimate the chronology of Rojdi as follows:

- Rojdi C 1900-1700 BCE
- Rojdi B 2200-1900 BCE
- Rojdi A 2500-2200 BCE

== Architecture ==
Two large excavation areas have been exposed at Rojdi, which are known as the South Extension and the Main Mound. There was also a systematic excavation at an outer gateway and at an isolated structure at the northern slope of the site. All of these very finely preserved structures can be dated to Rojdi C period (early second millennium BCE). The houses in Rojdi were built on stone foundations, probably with mud walls above them. No bricks were found, baked or otherwise, in the excavations. No wells, bathing platforms and the associated street drains were found either.

== The material culture ==
Much of the pottery found in Rojdi is a hard, red to buff ware made from well-prepared clay. The most frequently found vessel is the hemispherical red ware bowl, often with a stud handle, this accounts for over half of all shreds recovered from Rojdi. The pottery often has graffiti with signs from the Indus script, such as jar sign. There is also a short inscription in Harappan writing on the rim of a potsherd. Five (four complete and one broken) copper or bronze flat axes were found, all belonged to Rojdi C period. Signs of industrial and manufacturing activities are absent in all phases at Rojdi. Its overall character suggests a farmer's village.

== See also ==
- Indus Valley Civilization
- List of Indus Valley Civilization sites
- List of inventions and discoveries of the Indus Valley Civilization
- Hydraulic engineering of the Indus Valley Civilization
