= Anarta tradition =

Anarta Tradition
- Geographical range: South Asia (Gujarat)
- Period: Chalcolithic
- Dates: c. 3950 BCE to 1900 BCE
- Major sites: Loteshwar, Datrana
- Preceded by: possibly Mesolithic peoples
- Followed by: Harappan Civilization
- Defined by: P. Ajithprasad and V. H. Sonawane

The Anarta tradition or Anarta ware is a Chalcolithic culture tentatively dated between c. 3950 BCE to 1900 BCE based on radio carbon dates from Loteshwar and Gola Dhoro. The sites associated with it are located in Gujarat, India.

== Nomenclature ==
During the earlier excavations at Surkotada, the ceramics of this culture were described as the coarse red or gray "local" ware. P. Ajitprasad and V. H. Sonawane described these non-Harappan ceramics from north Gujarat as the "Anarta ware". Anarta is a historical name of north Gujarat. The name later applied retrospectively to this type of ceramics found from other sites.

== Geographical range ==
The core area of Anarta tradition is located in north Gujarat having 67 sites while four sites are reported from Kutch and three sites from Saurashtra regions. The Padri Ware is not very different from the Anarta tradition. So if it is considered as the Anarta tradition, its ten sites in Saurashtra can be added to the Anarta tradition.

== Sites and association with Harappans ==
The ceramics similar to the Anarta tradition was first reported from Surkotada with Classical Harappan (IA, IB and IC periods) ceramics. When Nagwada in Surendranagar district was excavated, this distinctive regional type of ceramics were first recognized where it was associated with Pre-Urban and Urban Harappan artifacts. The Anarta tradition was recognized as an independent culture when Loteshwar in Patan district was excavated in 1991-92. These ceramics are also associated with Pre-Urban Harappan Sindh Type Pottery/Burial pottery (Amri Nal type) found at Motipipli and Datrana and with Pre-Prabhas pottery at Datrana. These ceramics are also compared and found similar to the Padri Ware. These ceramics are also found in the association of the Classical Harappan and Sorath Harappan elements at Gola Dhoro (Bagasara) in Saurashtra and Shikarpur in Kutch. These ceramics are also found Rangpur IIC period. They are not found associated with Post-Urban Harrapan artefacts at any sites. Other sites are Panchasar, Santhli, Lothal, Zekhada, Rojdi and possibly Desalpur. These sites are concentrated in Patan, Mehsana and Banaskantha districts in north Gujarat. These sites in north Gujarat are located in sand dunes which may have provided fresh water from its interdunal depressions and pastures for animals. These people may have originated from the early Mesolithic people settled here. The lived alongside other "aboriginal" hunter-gatherer people.

== Ceramics ==
The Anarta ceramics include gritty red ware, fine red ware, burnished red ware and burnished grey/black wares. The pottery from this tradition are hand or slow wheel made and are coarse and well-fired. The vessel forms include straight or convex sided bowls with incurved rims; basins with thick flaring rim; pots or jars with flaring rim, narrow neck and bulging body. These vessels are treated with red slip with paintings in red, black and white.
