= Loteshwar =

Village and archaeological site in Patan, Gujarat, India

- Location within India
- 23°36′N 71°50′E
- Cultures: Anarta tradition, Indus Valley Civilisation
- Location: Gujarat, India

Loteshwar is a village and an archaeological site belonging to Indus Valley Civilisation located at Patan district, Gujarat, India. This site is locally also known as Khari-no-timbo and located on a high sand dune on left bank of Khari river, a tributary of Rupen river.

== Archeology ==
=== Ancient site ===
The 2009 excavation at Loteshwar uncovered one of the earliest Mesolithic sites in Western India, with levels containing radiocarbon evidence of human activity since 8000 BCE as well as evidence of continuous microlithic tool traditions spanning over 5,000 years. These findings suggest a stable and long-term human presence in the region, contributing new insights into early settlement patterns in South Asia.

=== Excavation ===
Department of Archaeology and Ancient History, M.S.University, Baroda carried out excavation at Loteshwar during 1990-91. The excavation revealed two different cultural periods with Period I belonging to Monolithic culture and Period II belonging to a culture having affinity with the Harappan culture.

==== Period I ====
Period I, with 60 cm deposit on a sand dune, yielded large number of microlithic tools, flat sandstone "palettes", grinding stones and hammer stones. Tools were made of chert, jasper, agate and quartz. Two burials were also found.

==== Period II ====
Period II was represented by 80 cm deposits but deposits connected to habitation was about 20 cm to 25 cm thickness. Large number of pits (0.5 m to 2 m diameter, 0.5 m to 2 m depth) which were invariably filled ashy soil, potsherds, animal bones and other insignificant materials were found and the significance of these large number of pits is not fully understood.

Pottery collection from this site was predominated by gritty red ware and red ware, which were analogous in shape and style with similar pottery found at Nagwada and coarse redware and polychrome pottery found at Surkotada. Red ware was usually well fired and made of fine clay.

==== Artefacts ====
Bowls and pots with shades of black and red on cream/white background, coarse red ware and grey ware with incised designs, terracotta pinched type lumps, mushtika type lumps, steatite micro beads, agate beads, carnelian beads, amazonite beads etc. Terracotta objects found at this site included a figurine, bangles, clay lumps with impressions of reed etc.

=== Culture ===
The ceramics found at Loteshwar, distinct from Amri-Nal pottery, is associated with the Anarta tradition. It is of different nature from those of early Harappan period and suggest earlier pot-making activity in this area. The crested ridge technique of blade production is absent in Loteshwar. Loteshwar shows two fold cultural sequence (Mesolithic and Chalcolithic). The site has very thin Chalcolithic deposit showing about 2000 years of occupation which could be seasonal. It has several pits of varying diameter but there are no other structures. After the long time of Chalcolitic occupation, sheep and goats were introduced here.

=== Other findings ===
Other findings from Loteshwar include large amount of funeral remains in the form of skeletal remains of land animals like sheep, goat and cattle and fish as well as turtle.

== Places of interest ==
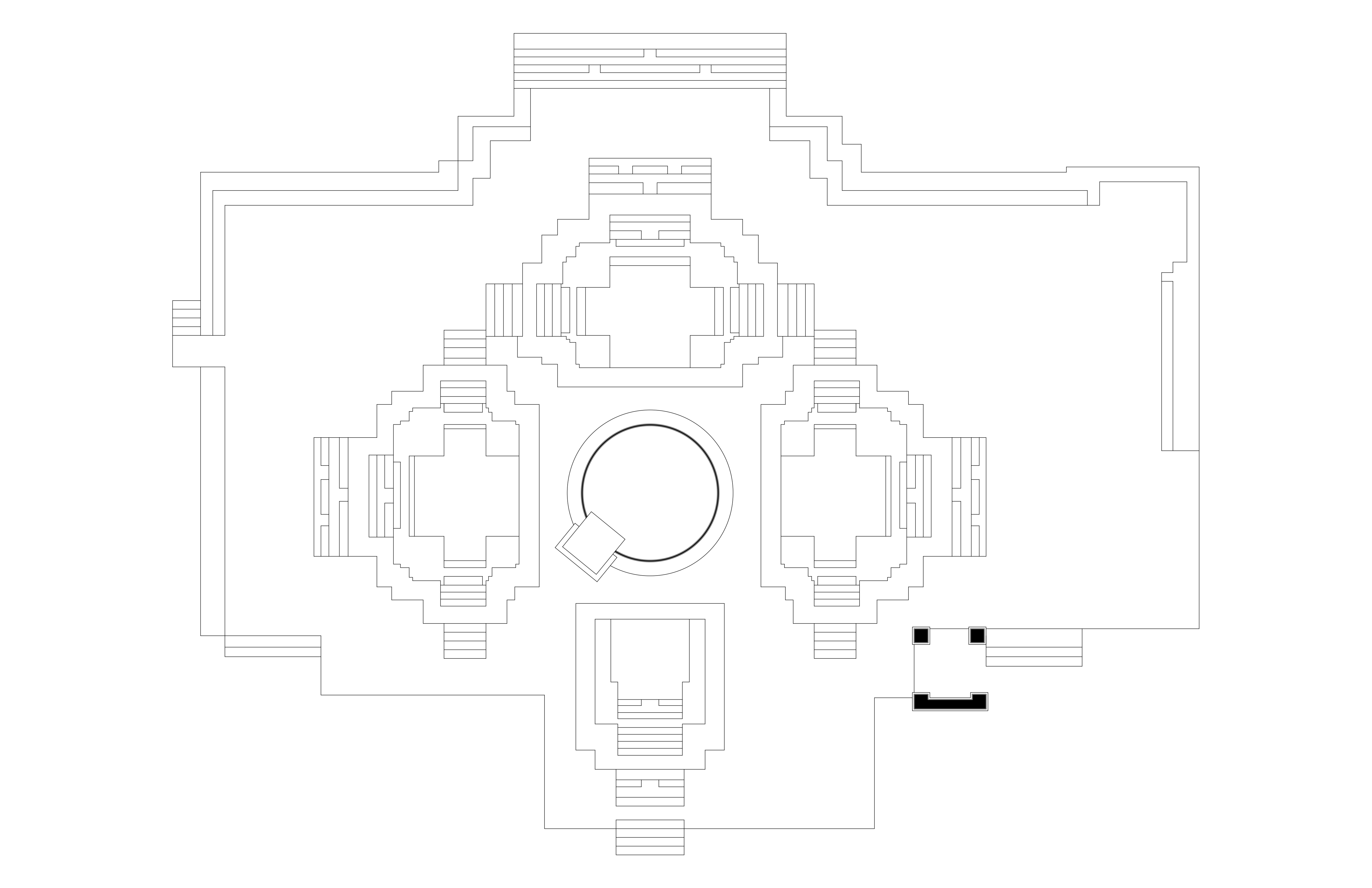
Floor plan of the Kund near Loteshvar Mahadev temple

There is a temple of Loteshvar Mahadev with a reservoir, Loteshwar Kund, in front, called pretgaya. A yearly fair, attended by about thousands of pilgrims, is held here on Phagun vad Amavasya (March - April). A bath in the pool, and certain religious ceremonies, are believed to draw out evil spirits and, at the same time, give them freedom, mukti, and absorption into the eternal Brahma.

== See also ==
- Indus Valley civilization
- List of Indus Valley Civilization sites
- List of inventions and discoveries of the Indus Valley Civilization
- Hydraulic engineering of the Indus Valley Civilization
