= Nagwada =

Nagvada
- Archaeological site
- Location within India
- Coordinates: 23°20′N 71°41′E
- Country: India
- State: Surendranagar
- Gujarat: Taluka
- District: Dasada
- Time zone: UTC+5.30 (Indian Standard Time)

Nagvada is an archaeological site belonging to the Indus Valley Civilisation, located in Dasada Taluka, Surendranagar district, Gujarat, India.

== See also ==
- Shikarpur, Gujarat
- Kerala-no-dhoro
