= Kerala-no-dhoro =

Kerala-no-dhoro‌ કેરળ-નો-ઢોરો Padri
- Archeological site
- Location within India
- Coordinates: 21°21′2″N 72°3′33″E
- State: Gujarat
- District: Bhavnagar
- Time zone: UTC+5.30 (Indian Standard Time)

Kerala-no-dhoro (Gujarati: કેરળ-નો-ઢોરો), also known as Padri, is an archaeological site in Gujarat, India. Belonging to the Indus Valley Civilisation, it is located on the southern coast of Kathiawar region. Dating from 3699-3792 B.C. known as Padri Culture or Early Harappan period a part of Sorath Harappan, Indus Valley culture.

== Period ==
Structures belonging to Early Harappan and Mature Harappan periods were found at this site. A different type of pottery found in this place as well as at Somnath (Prabhas Patan), Lotershwar indicate an indigenous tradition distinct from that of Amri-Nal, known from earlier occupations at Padri and Loteshwar (McIntosh, Jane).

== Findings ==
Copper fish hooks, of exceptionally big size are found here, indicating large fish were caught. Well made, sturdy storage jars were also found at this site, which were used for transporting salt. A jar found at this place is decorated with buffalo horn motif and with a large figure in a ragged skirt and wearing a pair of buffalo horns. In early Harappan levels of this site, symbols similar to Harappan writing were found and such writings were also found at Kalibangan and Dholavira.

== Structures ==
Rectangular houses, houses with rooms and workshops were constructed in Early Harappan Period. Houses constructed during Mature Harappan period were made of mud bricks with floors plastered with lime and dung; and these houses had storage spaces and hearths for cooking.

== Salt production ==
This unwalled village is thought have involved with production of salt, by evaporating sea water.

== See also ==
- List of Indus Valley Civilization sites
- Gola Dhoro
- Bhagatrav
