= Gola Dhoro =

- Location within Gujarat Location within India
- 23°3′30″N 70°37′10″E
- Type: Settlement
- Periods: Harappan 3A to Harappan 3C
- Cultures: Indus Valley civilization
- Location: Kutch District, Gujarat, India

Site notes
- Length: 50 m (160 ft)
- Width: 50 m (160 ft)
- Area: 1.92 ha (4.7 acres)
- Excavation dates: 1996–present
- Archaeologists: The Maharaja Sayyajirao University
- Condition: Ruined
- Owner: Public
- Public access: Yes

Gola Dhoro is an archaeological site belonging to Indus Valley civilization, situated at the head of the Gulf of Kutch, near Bagasara in Kutch district of Gujarat, India. The site contains a small fortified area of approximately 50x50 m with living quarters and manufacturing sites both inside and outside this area.

== Historical significance ==
The site is believed to date from 2500 to 2000 BC. There has been excavation in this place from 1996 onward was undertaken by The Maharaja Sayyajirao University, Baroda and a unique Harappan seal (from modern Pakistan), which is hollow inside and first of its kind, was found here. The excavation of this site has revealed evidence of manufacture and trade and highlighted importance of such smaller Harappan sites, in the economic development of Indus Valley Civilization.

== Artifacts found ==
Craft items of shell, semi-precious stone, stone beads, faience and copper, unique unicorn seal with hollow place looking some sort of container inside, other harappan seals (total six), copper knives with bone handles, copper artifacts, etc.

=== Copper objects ===
Being a small size settlement, the number of copper objects found at Gola Dhoro is very high. A copper vessel containing eight bangles, an axe probably used for recycling precious metal, copper knives with bone handles are found. A unique copper battle-axe (parashu) is also an interesting find from this area and the small size of the battle-axe suggests it as presumably used for ritualistic purposes. The unique copper knives were found in association with a large amount of fish bones, suggesting that the knives were used for drying fish. However, no evidence of copper smelting has been found, but heavily tampered clay crucibles with copper adhering in them have been found, suggesting that they might have been used for copper smelting.

== Harappan seals ==
Considering its relatively small size of less than 2 hectares, Archaeologists did not expect much from Gola Dhoro, but they were surprised to find five inscribed steatite seals with a unicorn depicted on each. These types of seals are fairly common in urban centres of Indus Valley civilization, which would have been used in trade related activities. In addition to the engraved inscription and unicorn picture, one of the seals has a deep scooped out rectangular socket like cavity, the purpose of which is not clear. Such seals with sockets is a unique find and not reported in any other Harappan site.

== Importance ==
Although this settlement was small in area, with 1.92 hectares, it had a wall measuring 5.20m in width built in three successive stages and there was flourishing craft and trading activities. Gola Dhoro specialised in the production of shell bangles and semi-precious stone beads as well as objects of copper and faience. Bead manufacturing was undertaken mainly outside the walled area of the town and objects of faience were manufactured only within the walled area. This unwalled town with a walled citadel, seems to have been a centre for trade and industry. Large blackware storage jars suggest the settlement engaged in overseas trade, since such vessels were used for transporting goods to Magan (present-day Oman).

== See also ==
- List of Indus Valley Civilization sites
- Shikarpur, Gujarat
- Kerala-no-dhoro
