= Langhnaj =

- village
- Location in Gujarat, India Langhnaj (India)
- Coordinates: 23°27′0″N 72°29′0″E
- Country: India
- State: Gujarat
- District: Mehsana

Population (2001)
  - Total: 9,363

Languages
  - Official: Gujarati, Hindi
- Time zone: UTC+5:30 (IST)
- PIN: 382730
- Vehicle registration: GJ-2
- Website: gujaratindia.com

Lānghnaj (Lāṅghṇaj) is a village in Mehsana district in the state of Gujarat, India. Lānghnaj is situated about 15 km to the north of Nardipur.

== Name ==
According to Hasmukh Dhirajlal Sankalia, the name Lāṅghṇaj is derived from Lāṅgaṇaijya, mentioned in a Chaulukya-era inscription.

== Demographics ==
As of 2001 India census, Lānghnaj had a population of 9363: 4909 males and 4454 females.

== History ==
=== Prehistoric significance ===
Bones of wild animals dating back to the Mesolithic period (10000-8000 BCE) have been excavated from sites in Lānghnaj. These include a canid (probably wolf), mongoose, rhinoceros, wild boar, chital, hog deer, swamp deer, nilgai and blackbuck. The presence of wild cattle has also been suggested. The animals bones at Lānghnaj suggest that the area was covered by a combination of savannah and forest with interspersed wetlands. Seven human skeletons and large number of microliths were also recovered.

Initial excavation and investigation at Lānghnaj was in 1944-63 and was conducted at Andhario Timbo or Ravalian no Timbo by Department of Environmental Archeology, University of London and Deccan college Post graduate & Research Institute of Pune.

== Economy ==
The village is also located within the Cambay rift Basin, a petroleum-rich, narrow, elongated rift graben, extending from Surat in the south to Sanchor in the north.
