= Anarta =

Ancient Indian region

Anarta is identified as the area in and around Vadnagar (marked here in modern day Gujarat state).

Anarta (Sanskrit: आनर्त, Ānarta) was an ancient Indian region which corresponded to the present-day North Saurashtra to North Gujarat regions in Gujarat state of India. Several ancient inscriptions and literary sources mention a town called Anartapura or Anandapura, which is identified as the area in and around the present-day Vadnagar.

== Anarta in the Puranic literature ==
According to the Puranic accounts, this region was ruled by the Sharyata dynasty rulers, who claimed their descent from Sharyati, a son of Vaivasvata Manu. The kingdom was named after Anarta, the son of Sharyati. The capital of this kingdom was Kushasthali (the ancient name of Dwaraka). The last ruler of this dynasty was Kakudmi. After him, it was occupied by the Punyajana Rakshasas. Later, the Yadavas migrated to this region under the leadership of Lord Krishna.

Sage Chyavana was also connected with Sharyati and Anarta. He married Sukanya, daughter of Sharyati and sacrificed for him. His descendants were associated with the Haihayas, which occupied the neighbouring region, apparently after the demise of the Sharyata kingdom.

== Anarta under Saka rule ==
The Junagarh rock inscription of the Saka ruler Rudradaman I mentions Anarta as a part of his kingdom. He placed Anarta under his Pahlava (Parthian) Amatya (minister) Suvishakha, who re-built a dam on the Sudarshana Lake there.
