= Shikarpur, Gujarat =

Village in Gujarat, India

Shikarpur
- Valmio Timbo (Local)
- Location within India
- 23°14′15″N 70°40′39″E
- Type: Settlement
- Periods: Harappan 3A to Harappan 3C
- Cultures: Indus Valley civilization
- Location: Kutch District, Gujarat, India

Site notes
- Height: 7.5 m (25 ft)
- Area: 4.3 ha (11 acres)
- Excavation dates: 1987–89, 2007-08
- Archaeologists: State Archaeology Department and The Maharaja Sayyajirao University
- Condition: Ruined
- Owner: Public
- Public access: Yes

Shikarpur is a village in Bhachau Taluka of Kutch district of Gujarat, India. Nearby excavations have revealed a site belonging to the Indus Valley Civilisation, also known as the Harappan civilisation.

== History ==
The fort of the village was built in the 19th century. It includes the tombs of three Muslim saints: Patha, Gebansha Multani, and Asaba. Patha, who is said to have come from Sindh, earned his fame by changing salt water into fresh; Gebansha by continuing to fight after his head was cut off; and Asaba by curing the blind. The tombs are simple buildings.

== Archeology ==
=== Site description ===
The archaeological site is 4.5 kilometres (2.8 mi) south of Shikarpur, at Valmio Timbo. It consists of a Harappan settlement covering 3.4 hectares, where the main activity appears to have been the manufacture of artefacts.

=== Excavation history ===
Gujarat State Archaeology Department conducted excavations during 1987–1989. These revealed a deposit over 3 metres (9.8 ft) thick, with its lower layers representing the Early Harappan period and the upper layers representing Mature Harappan. Further extensive excavations were carried in 2007–2008 by The Maharaja Sayyajirao University, Baroda. These discovered some important artefacts and other details.

=== Artifacts ===
Among the artefacts found are ornaments of semi-precious stones, steatite and terracotta, bangles made of shell and terracotta, copper chisels and knives, arrowheads, rings, terracotta toy cart frames, and animal figures. A depiction of a human torso made of terracotta was another important finding: this is well-baked, but the arms, head and lower part of the body are broken off. Pottery with various types of drawings and engraved designs were also found. Other findings include conch-shell bangles, slice, terracotta toy cartwheels and frame, bangles, triangular cakes, bull figurines, pecker points and trimmer made of bone, micro gold beads, carnelian drill-bits, dish on stand, bowls, miniature pots, etc. An assemblage of Rohri chert blades was also found.

There are two terracotta sealings with inscriptions; on one seal is a picture of a three-headed unicorn; second sealing has three consecutive stampings of Harappan seals and the stamping is done in such a manner that the inscribed upper part of all three seals is clear. The reverse of the sealings bear the mark of thread and knots.

=== Subsistence patterns ===
15,483 bones pieces, which were excavated at Shikarpur and studied at Archaeology Laboratory, Deccan College Pune, reveal details about subsistence patterns of Harappans. 53.46% of the bones were identified which consisted of 47 species including 23 mammals (cattle bones being numerous, wild buffalo, nilgai, blackbuck, deer, wild pig, hare, rhino etc.), three birds, five fish, 13 mollusks etc. which is broadly suggestive of food habits of Harappans. Bones of domesticated animals comprised 85 per cent of faunal assemblance in both early and mature Harappan phase. A small quantity of horse bones were also found here and these occur only in the Mature Harappan Phase.

== See also ==
- List of Indus Valley Civilization sites
- Gola Dhoro
