= Indian religions =

Religions that originated on the Indian subcontinent

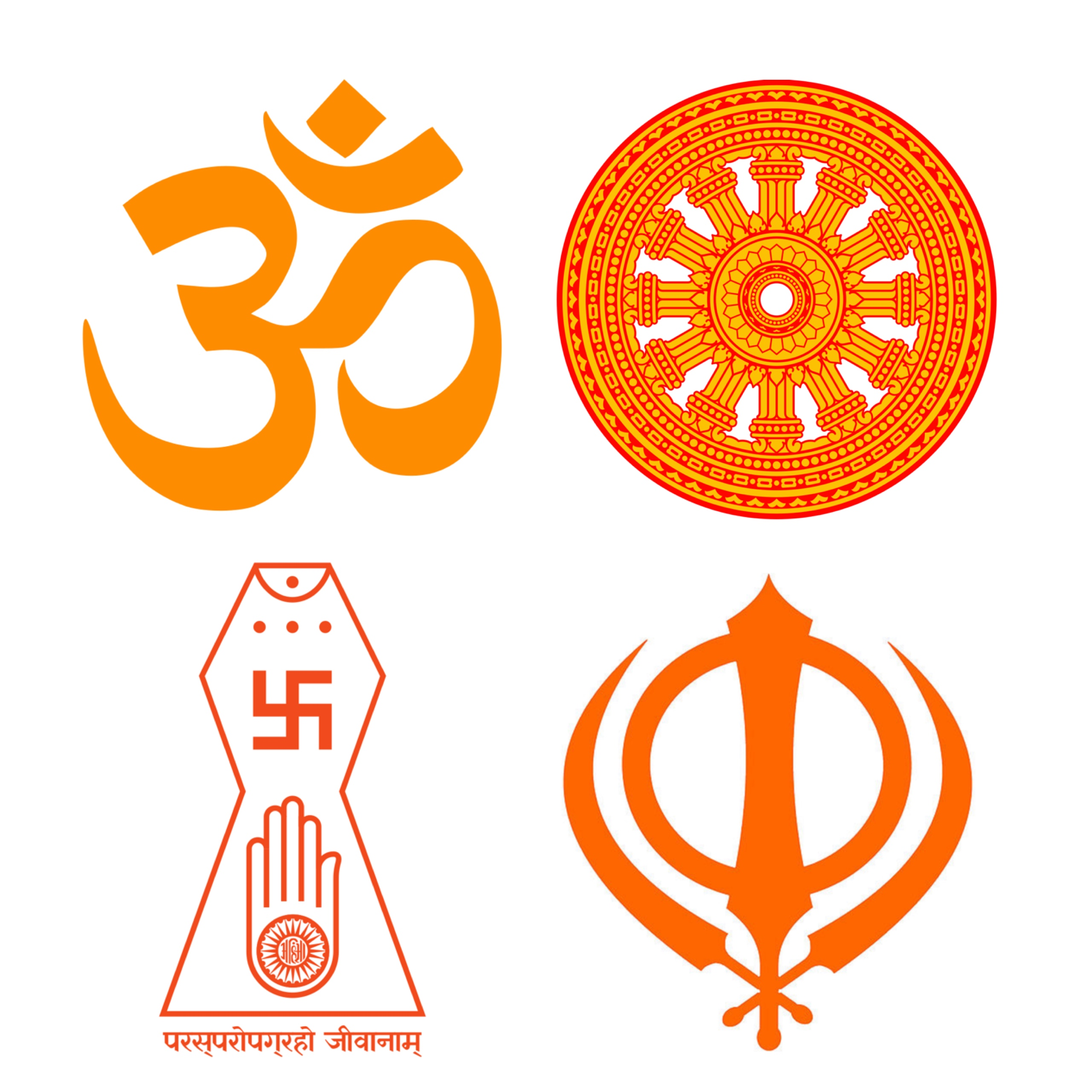
From left to right, then downwards: the Om (Hinduism), the Dharmachakra (Buddhism), the Pratika Cihna (Jainism) and the Khanda (Sikhism) are the symbols commonly used to represent the four major Indian religions.

Followers of Indian religions by country on a map

Indian religions as a percentage of world population
1. Hinduism (16.0%)
2. Buddhism (7.10%)
3. Sikhism (0.35%)
4. Jainism (0.06%)
5. Non-Indian religions and irreligion (76.5%)

Indian religions by number of followers (2020 survey)
Religion	Population
Hindus	1.25 billion
Buddhists	320 million
Sikhs	30 million
Jains	6 million
Others	4 million
Total	1.61 billion

Indian religions, also known as Dharmic religions, are the religions that originated in the Indian subcontinent. These religions, which include Buddhism, Hinduism, Jainism, Sikhism and faiths based on these doctrines, (Note: Adams, C. J., "Classification of religions: Geographical", Encyclopædia Britannica, 2007. Retrieved 15 July 2010.) (Note: Adams: "Indian religions, including early Buddhism, Hinduism, Jainism, and Sikhism, and sometimes also Theravāda Buddhism and the Hindu- and Buddhist-inspired religions of South and Southeast Asia".) are also classified as part of Eastern religions. Although Indian religions are connected through the history of India, they constitute a wide range of religious communities, and are not confined to the Indian subcontinent.

Evidence attesting to prehistoric religion in the Indian subcontinent comes from scattered Mesolithic rock paintings. The Harappan people of the Indus Valley Civilisation, which lasted from 3300 to 1300 BCE (mature period 2600–1900 BCE), had an early urbanised culture which predates the Vedic religion.

The documented history of Indian religions begins with the historical Vedic religion, the religious practices of the early Indo-Aryan peoples, which were collected and later redacted into the Vedas, as well as the Agamas of Dravidian origin. The period of the composition, redaction, and commentary of these texts is known as the Vedic period, which lasted from roughly 1750 to 500 BCE. The philosophical portions of the Vedas were summarised in Upanishads, which are commonly referred to as Vedānta, variously interpreted to mean either the "last chapters, parts of the Veda" or "the object, the highest purpose of the Veda". The early Upanishads all predate the Common Era, five (Note: The pre-Buddhist Upanishads are: Brihadaranyaka, Chandogya, Kaushitaki, Aitareya, and Taittiriya Upanishads.) of the eleven principal Upanishads were composed in all likelihood before the 6th century BCE, and contain the earliest mentions of yoga and moksha.

The śramaṇa period between 800 and 200 BCE marks a "turning point between the Vedic Hinduism and Puranic Hinduism". The Shramana movement, an ancient Indian religious movement parallel to but separate from Vedic tradition, often defied many of the Vedic and Upanishadic concepts of soul (Atman) and the ultimate reality (Brahman). In the 6th century BCE, the Shramnic movement matured into Jainism and Buddhism and was responsible for the schism of Indian religions into two main philosophical branches of astika, which venerates Veda (e.g., six orthodox schools of Hinduism) and nastika (e.g., Buddhism, Jainism, Charvaka, etc.) which does not believe in Vedas being the only true source of knowledge. However, both branches shared the related concepts of yoga, saṃsāra (the cycle of birth and death) and moksha (liberation from that cycle). (Note: The shared concepts include rebirth, samsara, karma, meditation, renunciation and moksha.) (Note: The Upanishadic, Buddhist and Jain renunciation traditions form parallel traditions, which share some common concepts and interests. While Kuru-Panchala, at the central Ganges Plain, formed the center of the early Upanishadic tradition, Kosala-Magadha at the central Ganges Plain formed the center of the other shramanic traditions.) (Note: Buddhism and Hinduism Similarities)

The Puranic Period (200 BCE – 500 CE) and early medieval period (500–1100 CE) gave rise to new configurations of Hinduism, especially bhakti and Shaivism, Shaktism, Vaishnavism, Smarta, and smaller groups like the conservative Shrauta.

The early Islamic period (1100–1500 CE) also gave rise to new movements. Sikhism was founded in the 15th century on the teachings of Guru Nanak and the nine successive Sikh Gurus in Northern India. The vast majority of its adherents originate in the Punjab region. During the period of British rule in India, a reinterpretation and synthesis of Hinduism arose, which aided the Indian independence movement.

== History ==
=== Periodisation ===
Scottish historian James Mill, in his seminal work The History of British India (1817), distinguished three phases in the history of India, namely the Hindu, Muslim, and British periods. This periodisation has been criticised, for the misconceptions it has given rise to. Another periodisation is the division into "ancient, classical, medieval, and modern periods", although this periodisation has also received criticism.

Romila Thapar notes that the division of Hindu-Muslim-British periods of Indian history gives too much weight to "ruling dynasties and foreign invasions", neglecting the social-economic history which often showed a strong continuity. The division in Ancient-Medieval-Modern overlooks the fact that the Muslim conquests took place between the eight and the fourteenth centuries, while the south was never completely conquered. According to Thapar, a periodisation could also be based on "significant social and economic changes", which are not strictly related to a change of ruling powers. (Note: See also Tanvir Anjum, Temporal Divides: A Critical Review of the Major Schemes of Periodization in Indian History.)

Smart and Michaels seem to follow Mill's periodisation, while Flood and Muesse follow the "ancient, classical, mediaeval and modern periods" periodisation. An elaborate periodisation may be as follows:

- Indian pre-history including Indus Valley Civilisation (until c. 1750 BCE)
- Iron Age including Vedic period (c. 1750–600 BCE)
- "Second Urbanisation" (c. 600–200 BCE)
- Classical period (c. 200 BCE – 1200 CE) (Note: Different periods are designated as "classical Hinduism": Smart calls the period between 1000 BCE and 100 CE "pre-classical". It is the formative period for the Upanishads and Brahmanism (Note: Smart distinguishes "Brahmanism" from the Vedic religion, connecting "Brahmanism" with the Upanishads.) Jainism and Buddhism. For Smart, the "classical period" lasts from 100 to 1000 CE, and coincides with the flowering of "classical Hinduism" and the flowering and deterioration of Mahayana-buddhism in India.; For Michaels, the period between 500 BCE and 200 BCE is a time of "Ascetic reformism", whereas the period between 200 BCE and 1100 CE is the time of "classical Hinduism", since there is "a turning point between the Vedic religion and Hindu religions".; Muesse discerns a longer period of change, namely between 800 BCE and 200 BCE, which he calls the "Classical Period". According to Muesse, some of the fundamental concepts of Hinduism, namely karma, reincarnation and "personal enlightenment and transformation", which did not exist in the Vedic religion, developed in this time.)
  - Pre-Classical period (c. 200 BCE – 320 CE)
  - "Golden Age" (Gupta Empire) (c. 320–650 CE)
  - Late-Classical period (c. 650–1200 CE)
- Medieval period (c. 1200–1500 CE)
- Early Modern (c. 1500–1850)
- Modern period (British Raj and independence) (from c. 1850)

=== Prevedic religions (before c. 1750 BCE) ===
==== Prehistory ====
The earliest religion followed by the peoples of the Indian subcontinent, including those of the Indus Valley and Ganges Valley, was likely local animism that did not have missionaries.

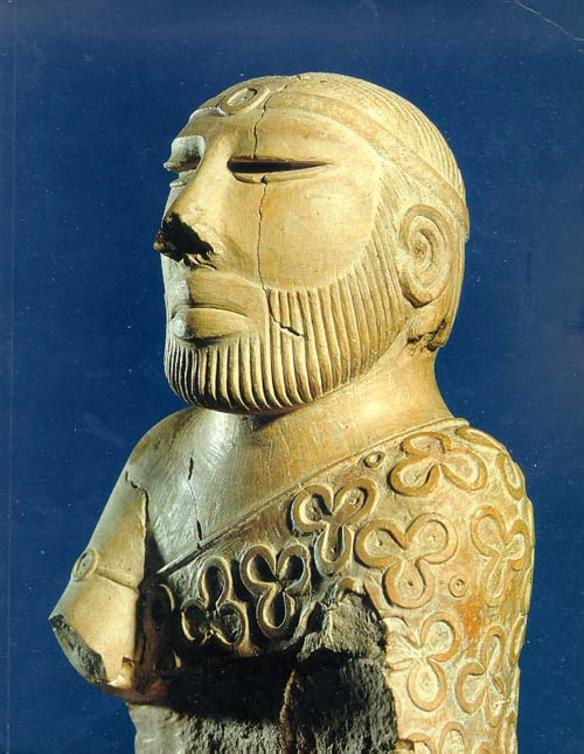
"Priest King" of Indus Valley Civilisation

Evidence attesting to prehistoric religion in the Indian subcontinent derives from scattered Mesolithic rock paintings such as at Bhimbetka, depicting dances and rituals. Neolithic agriculturalists inhabiting the Indus River Valley buried their dead in a manner suggestive of spiritual practices that incorporated notions of an afterlife and belief in magic. Other South Asian Stone Age sites, such as the Bhimbetka rock shelters in central Madhya Pradesh and the Kupgal petroglyphs of eastern Karnataka, contain rock art portraying religious rites and evidence of possible ritualised music.

==== Indus Valley Civilisation ====
The religion and belief system of the Indus Valley people has received considerable attention, especially from the view of identifying precursors to deities and religious practices of Indian religions that later developed in the area. However, due to the sparsity of evidence, which is open to varying interpretations, and the fact that the Indus script remains undeciphered, the conclusions are partly speculative and largely based on a retrospective view from a much later Hindu perspective. An early and influential work in the area that set the trend for Hindu interpretations of archaeological evidence from the Harrapan sites was that of John Marshall, who in 1931 identified the following as prominent features of the Indus religion: a Great Male God and a Mother Goddess; deification or veneration of animals and plants; symbolic representation of the phallus (linga) and vulva (yoni); and, use of baths and water in religious practice. Marshall's interpretations have been much debated, and sometimes disputed over the following decades.

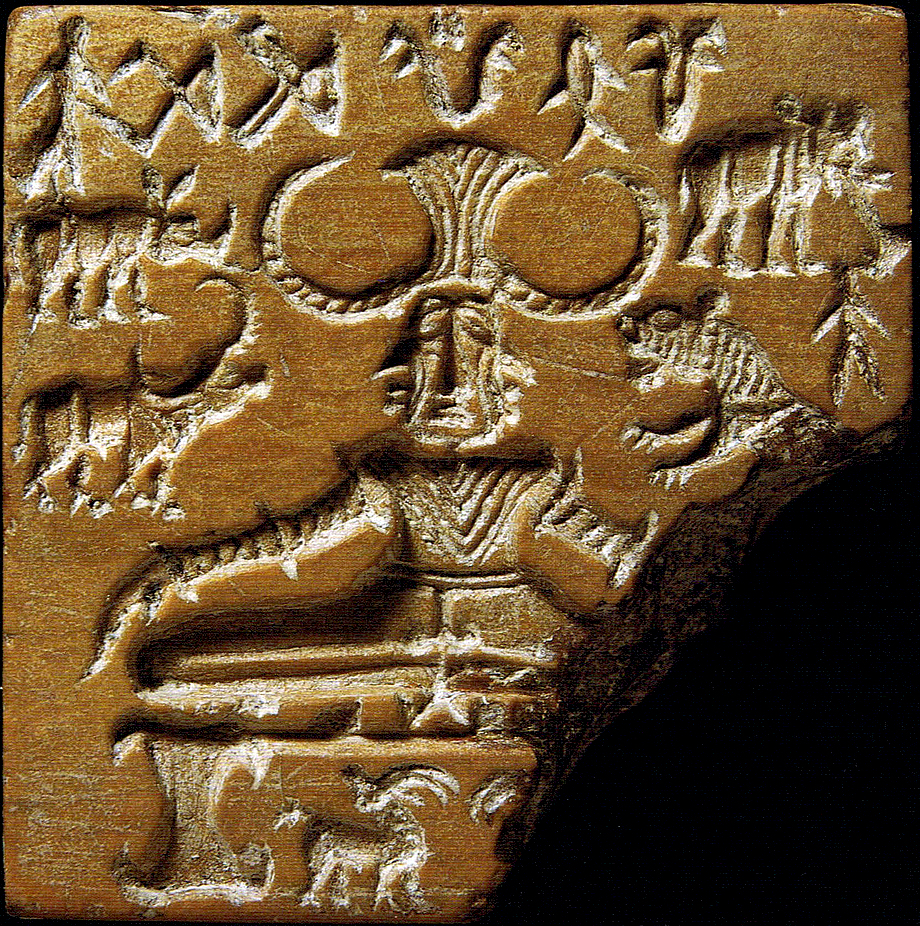
The Pashupati seal, showing a seated and possibly ithyphallic figure, surrounded by animals.

One Indus valley seal shows a seated figure with a horned headdress, surrounded by animals. Marshall identified the figure as an early form of the Hindu god Shiva (or Rudra), who is associated with asceticism, yoga, and linga; regarded as a lord of animals; and often depicted as having three eyes. The seal has hence come to be known as the Pashupati Seal, after Pashupati (lord of all animals), an epithet of Shiva. While Marshall's work has earned some support, many critics and even supporters have raised several objections. Doris Srinivasan has argued that the figure does not have three faces, or yogic posture, and that in Vedic literature Rudra was not a protector of wild animals. Herbert Sullivan and Alf Hiltebeitel also rejected Marshall's conclusions, with the former claiming that the figure was female, while the latter associated the figure with Mahisha, the Buffalo God and the surrounding animals with vahanas (vehicles) of deities for the four cardinal directions. Writing in 2002, Gregory L. Possehl concluded that while it would be appropriate to recognise the figure as a deity, its association with the water buffalo, and its posture as one of ritual discipline, regarding it as a proto-Shiva would be going too far. Despite the criticisms of Marshall's association of the seal with a proto-Shiva icon, it has been interpreted as the Tirthankara Rishabha by Jains and Vilas Sangave or an early Buddha by Buddhists. Historians like Heinrich Zimmer, Thomas McEvilley are of the opinion that there exists some link between first Jain Tirthankara Rishabha and Indus Valley Civilisation.

Marshall hypothesised the existence of a cult of Mother Goddess worship based upon excavation of several female figurines, and thought that this was a precursor of the Hindu sect of Shaktism. However the function of the female figurines in the life of Indus Valley people remains unclear, and Possehl does not regard the evidence for Marshall's hypothesis to be "terribly robust". Some of the baetyls interpreted by Marshall to be sacred phallic representations are now thought to have been used as pestles or game counters instead, while the ring stones that were thought to symbolise yoni were determined to be architectural features used to stand pillars, although the possibility of their religious symbolism cannot be eliminated.

Many Indus Valley seals show animals, with some depicting them being carried in processions, while others show chimeric creations. One seal from Mohen-jodaro shows a half-human, half-buffalo monster attacking a tiger, which may be a reference to the Sumerian myth of such a monster created by goddess Aruru to fight Gilgamesh. Some seals show a man wearing a hat with two horns and a plant sitting on a throne with animals surrounding him. Some scholars theorise that this was a predecessor to Shiva wearing a hat worn by some Sumerian divine beings and kings.

In contrast to contemporary Egyptian and Mesopotamian civilisations, the Indus Valley lacks any monumental palaces, even though excavated cities indicate that the society possessed the requisite engineering knowledge. This may suggest that religious ceremonies, if any, may have been largely confined to individual homes, small temples, or the open air. Several sites have been proposed by Marshall and later scholars as possibly devoted to religious purpose, but at present only the Great Bath at Mohenjo-daro is widely thought to have been so used, as a place for ritual purification. The funerary practices of the Harappan civilisation is marked by its diversity with evidence of supine burial; fractional burial in which the body is reduced to skeletal remains by exposure to the elements before final interment; and even cremation.

=== Vedic period (1750–800 BCE) ===
The documented history of Indian religions begins with the historical Vedic religion, the religious practices of the early Indo-Aryans, which were collected and later redacted into the Samhitas (usually known as the Vedas), four canonical collections of hymns or mantras composed in archaic Sanskrit. These texts are the central shruti (revealed) texts of Hinduism. The period of the composition, redaction, and commentary of these texts is known as the Vedic period, which lasted from roughly 1750 to 500 BCE.

The Vedic Period is most significant for the composition of the four Vedas, Brahmanas and the older Upanishads (both presented as discussions on the rituals, mantras and concepts found in the four Vedas), which today are some of the most important canonical texts of Hinduism, and are the codification of much of what developed into its core beliefs.

Some modern Hindu scholars use the "Vedic religion" synonymously with "Hinduism". According to Sundararajan, Hinduism is also known as the Vedic religion. Other authors state that the Vedas contain "the fundamental truths about Hindu Dharma" (Note: Ashim Kumar Bhattacharyya declares that Vedas contain the fundamental truths about Hindu Dharma.) which is called "the modern version of the ancient Vedic Dharma". The Arya Samaj recognises the Vedic religion as true Hinduism. Nevertheless, according to Jamison and Witzel:

...to call this period Vedic Hinduism is a contradiction in terms since Vedic religion is very different from what we generally call Hindu religion – at least as much as Old Hebrew religion is from medieval and modern Christian religion. However, Vedic religion is treatable as a predecessor of Hinduism." (Note: Richard E. King notes: "Consequently, it remains an anachronism to project the notion of "Hinduism" as it is commonly understood into pre-colonial history.")

==== Early Vedic period – early Vedic compositions (c. 1750–1200 BCE) ====
The rishis, the composers of the hymns of the Rigveda, were considered inspired poets and seers. (Note: In post-Vedic times understood as "hearers" of an eternally existing Veda, Śrauta means "what is heard")

The mode of worship was the performance of Yajna, sacrifices which involved sacrifice and sublimation of the havana sámagri (herbal preparations) in the fire, accompanied by the singing of Samans and 'mumbling' of Yajus, the sacrificial mantras. The sublime meaning of the word yajna is derived from the Sanskrit verb yaj, which has a three-fold meaning of worship of deities (devapujana), unity (saògatikaraña), and charity (dána). An essential element was the sacrificial fire – the divine Agni – into which oblations were poured, as everything offered into the fire was believed to reach God.

Central concepts in the Vedas are Satya and Rta. Satya is derived from Sat, the present participle of the verbal root as, "to be, to exist, to live". Sat means "that which really exists [...] the really existent truth; the Good", and Sat-ya means "is-ness". Rta, "that which is properly joined; order, rule; truth", is the principle of natural order which regulates and coordinates the operation of the universe and everything within it. "Satya (truth as being) and rita (truth as law) are the primary principles of Reality and its manifestation is the background of the canons of dharma, or a life of righteousness." "Satya is the principle of integration rooted in the Absolute, rita is its application and function as the rule and order operating in the universe." Conformity with Ṛta would enable progress whereas its violation would lead to punishment. Panikkar remarks:

Ṛta is the ultimate foundation of everything; it is "the supreme", although this is not to be understood in a static sense. [...] It is the expression of the primordial dynamism that is inherent in everything..."

The term rta is inherited from the Proto-Indo-Iranian religion, the religion of the Indo-Iranian peoples prior to the earliest Vedic (Indo-Aryan) and Zoroastrian (Iranian) scriptures. "Asha" is the Avestan language term (corresponding to Vedic language ṛta) for a concept of cardinal importance to Zoroastrian theology and doctrine. The term "Dharma" was already used in Brahmanical thought, where it was conceived as an aspect of Rta.

Major philosophers of this era were Rishis Narayana, Kanva, Rishaba, Vamadeva, and Angiras.

==== Middle Vedic period (c. 1200–850 BCE) ====
During the Middle Vedic period, the mantras of the Yajurveda and the older Brahmana texts were composed. The Brahmans became powerful intermediairies.

Historical roots of Jainism in India is traced back to 9th-century BCE with the rise of Parshvanatha and his non-violent philosophy.

==== Late Vedic period (from 850 BCE) ====
The Vedic religion evolved into Hinduism and Vedanta, a religious path considering itself the 'essence' of the Vedas, interpreting the Vedic pantheon as a unitary view of the universe with 'God' (Brahman) seen as immanent and transcendent in the forms of Ishvara and Brahman. This post-Vedic systems of thought, along with the Upanishads and later texts like the epics (the Ramayana and the Mahabharata), is a major component of modern Hinduism. The ritualistic traditions of Vedic religion are preserved in the conservative Śrauta tradition.

=== Sanskritisation ===
Since Vedic times, "people from many strata of society throughout the subcontinent tended to adapt their religious and social life to Brahmanic norms", a process sometimes called Sanskritisation. It is reflected in the tendency to identify local deities with the gods of the Sanskrit texts.

=== Shramanic period (c. 800–200 BCE) ===
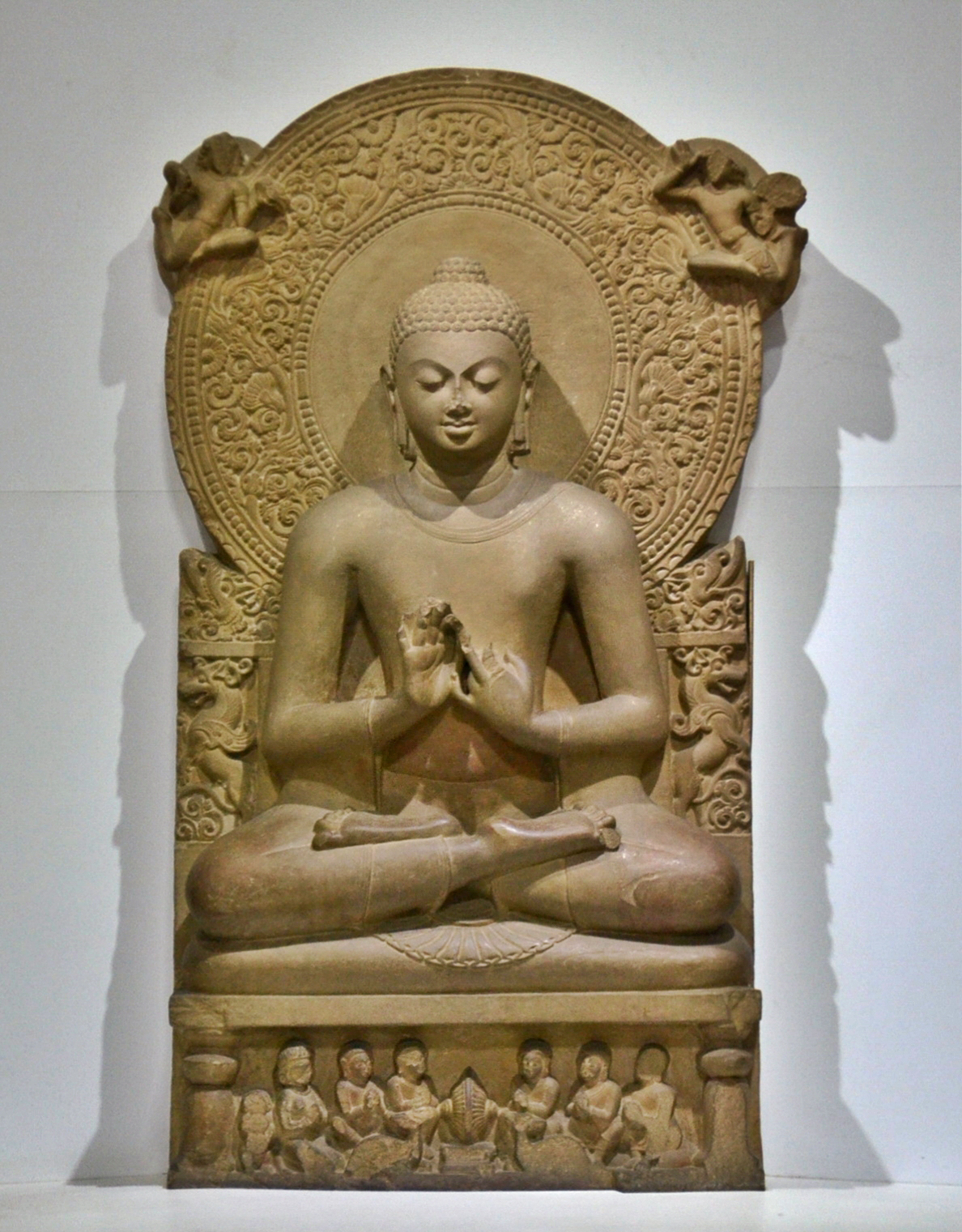
A statue of Gautama Buddha from Sarnath, Uttar Pradesh, India, 4th century CE.

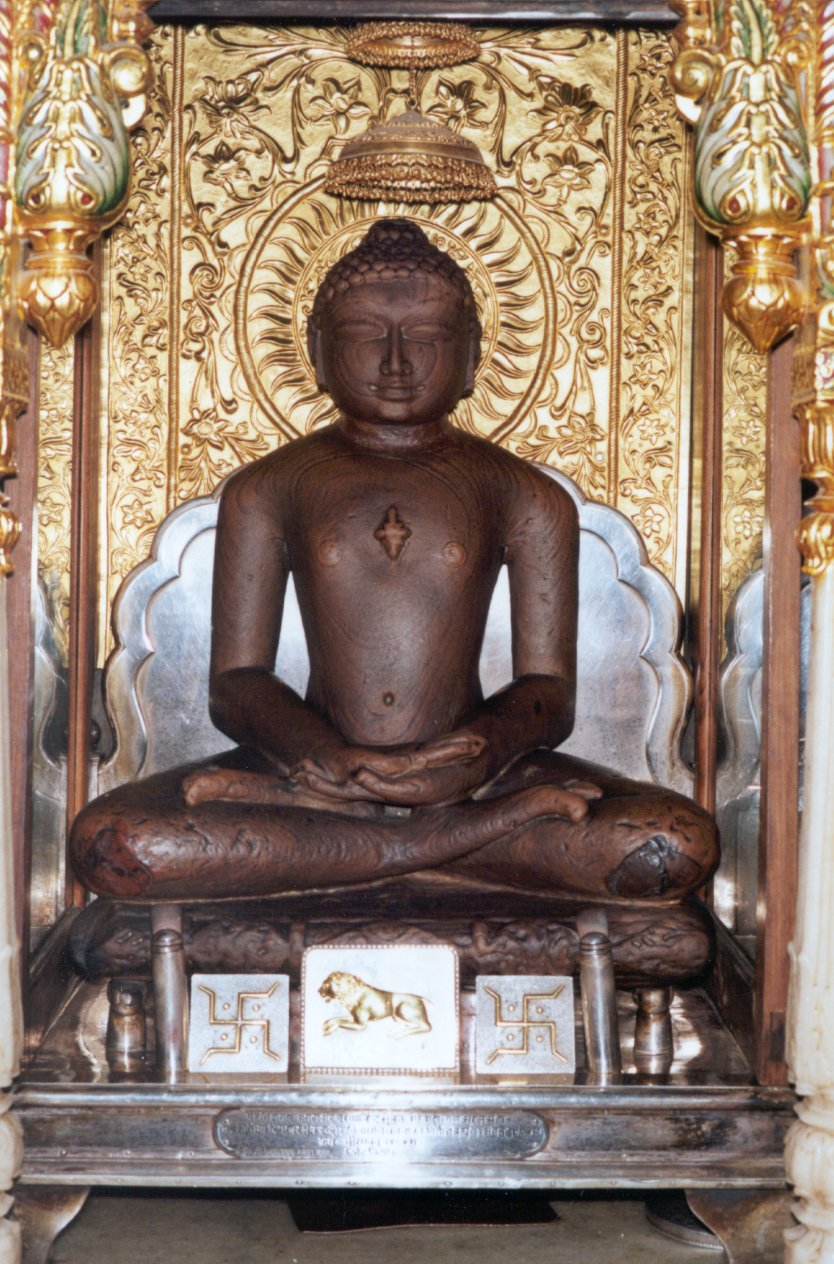
The idol of Mahavira, the 24th and last Tirthankara of Jainism.

During the time of the shramanic reform movements "many elements of the Vedic religion were lost". According to Michaels, "it is justified to see a turning point between the Vedic religion and Hindu religions".

==== Late Vedic period – Brahmanas and Upanishads – Vedanta (850–500 BCE) ====
The late Vedic period (9th to 6th centuries BCE) marks the beginning of the Upanisadic or Vedantic period. (Note: Indiana University "India Studies Program" Passage to India, Module 10.) (Note: "Upanishads came to be composed already in the ninth and eighth century B.C.E. and continued to be composed well into the first centuries of the Common Era. The Brahmanas and Aranyakas are somewhat older, reaching back to the eleventh and even twelfth century BCE.") (Note: Deussen: "these treatises are not the work of a single genius, but the total philosophical product of an entire epoch which extends [from] approximately 1000 or 800 BC, to c. 500 BCE, but which is prolonged in its offshoots far beyond this last limit of time.") This period heralded the beginning of much of what became classical Hinduism, with the composition of the Upanishads, later the Sanskrit epics, still later followed by the Puranas.

Upanishads form the speculative-philosophical basis of classical Hinduism and are known as Vedanta (conclusion of the Vedas). The older Upanishads launched attacks of increasing intensity on the ritual. Anyone who worships a divinity other than the Self is called a domestic animal of the gods in the Brihadaranyaka Upanishad. The Mundaka launches the most scathing attack on the ritual by comparing those who value sacrifice with an unsafe boat that is endlessly overtaken by old age and death.

Scholars believe that Parsva, the 23rd Jain tirthankara lived during this period in the 9th century BCE.

==== Rise of Shramanic tradition (7th to 5th centuries BCE) ====
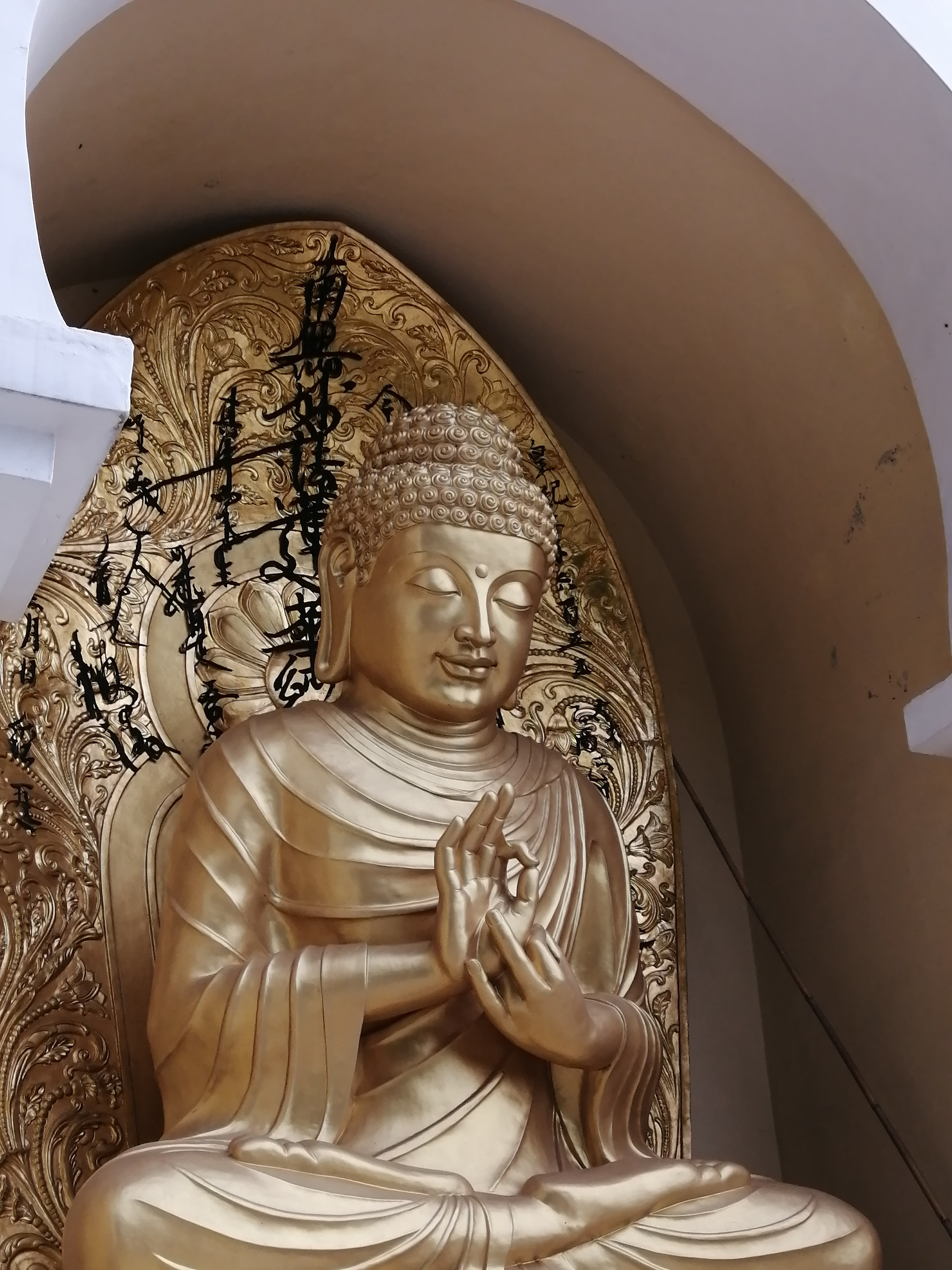
Buddha statue at Darjeeling

Jainism and Buddhism belong to the śramaṇa traditions. These religions rose into prominence in 700–500 BCE in the Magadha kingdom., reflecting "the cosmology and anthropology of a much older, pre-Aryan upper class of northeastern India", and were responsible for the related concepts of saṃsāra (the cycle of birth and death) and moksha (liberation from that cycle). (Note: Gavin Flood and Patrick Olivelle: "The second half of the first millennium BCE was the period that created many of the ideological and institutional elements that characterize later Indian religions. The renouncer tradition played a central role during this formative period of Indian religious history.... Some of the fundamental values and beliefs that we generally associate with Indian religions in general and Hinduism in particular were in part the creation of the renouncer tradition. These include the two pillars of Indian theologies: samsara – the belief that life in this world is one of suffering and subject to repeated deaths and births (rebirth); moksa/nirvana – the goal of human existence....")

The shramana movements challenged the orthodoxy of the rituals. The shramanas were wandering ascetics distinct from Vedism. (Note: Cromwell Crwaford: "Alongside Brahmanism was the non-Aryan Shramanic (self reliant) culture with its roots going back to prehistoric times.") (Note: Masih: "There is no evidence to show that Jainism and Buddhism ever subscribed to vedic sacrifices, vedic deities or caste. They are parallel or native religions of India and have contributed to much to [sic] the growth of even classical Hinduism of the present times.") (Note: Padmanabh S. Jaini: "Jainas themselves have no memory of a time when they fell within the Vedic fold. Any theory that attempts to link the two traditions, moreover fails to appreciate rather distinctive and very non-vedic character of Jaina cosmology, soul theory, karmic doctrine and atheism".) Mahavira, proponent of Jainism, and Buddha (c. 563-483), founder of Buddhism were the most prominent icons of this movement.

Shramana gave rise to the concept of the cycle of birth and death, the concept of samsara, and the concept of liberation. (Note: Flood: "The second half of the first millennium BCE was the period that created many of the ideological and institutional elements that characterise later Indian religions. The renouncer tradition played a central role during this formative period of Indian religious history.... Some of the fundamental values and beliefs that we generally associate with Indian religions in general and Hinduism in particular were in part the creation of the renouncer tradition. These include the two pillars of Indian theologies: samsara – the belief that life in this world is one of suffering and subject to repeated deaths and births (rebirth); moksa/nirvana – the goal of human existence....") (Note: Flood: "The origin and doctrine of Karma and Samsara are obscure. These concepts were certainly circulating among sramanas, and Jainism and Buddhism developed specific and sophisticated ideas about the process of transmigration. It is very possible that the karmas and reincarnation entered the mainstream brahaminical thought from the sramana or the renouncer traditions.") (Note: Padmanabh S. Jaini: "Yajnavalkya's reluctance and manner in expounding the doctrine of karma in the assembly of Janaka (a reluctance not shown on any other occasion) can perhaps be explained by the assumption that it was, like that of the transmigration of soul, of non-brahmanical origin. In view of the fact that this doctrine is emblazoned on almost every page of sramana scriptures, it is highly probable that it was derived from them.") (Note: Jeffrey Brodd and Gregory Sobolewski: "Jainism shares many of the basic doctrines of Hinduism and Buddhism.") The influence of Upanishads on Buddhism has been a subject of debate among scholars. While Radhakrishnan, Oldenberg and Neumann were convinced of Upanishadic influence on the Buddhist canon, Eliot and Thomas highlighted the points where Buddhism was opposed to Upanishads. Buddhism may have been influenced by some Upanishadic ideas, it however discarded their orthodox tendencies. In Buddhist texts Buddha is presented as rejecting avenues of salvation as "pernicious views".

===== Jainism =====
Jainism was established by a lineage of 24 enlightened beings culminating with Parshvanatha (9th century BCE) and Mahavira (6th century BCE). (Note: Oldmeadow: "Over time, apparent misunderstandings have arisen over the origins of Jainism and relationship with its sister religions of Hinduism and Buddhism. There has been an ongoing debate between Jainism and Vedic Hinduism as to which revelation preceded the other. What is historically known is that there was a tradition along with Vedic Hinduism known as Sramana Dharma. Essentially, the sramana tradition included it its fold, the Jain and Buddhist traditions, which disagreed with the eternality of the Vedas, the needs for ritual sacrifices and the supremacy of the Brahmins." Page 141)

The 24th Tirthankara of Jainism, Mahavira, stressed five vows, including ahimsa (non-violence), satya (truthfulness), asteya (non-stealing), and aparigraha (non-attachment). As per Jain tradition, the teachings of the Tirthankaras predates all known time. The scholars believe Parshva, accorded status as the 23rd Tirthankara, was a historical figure. The Vedas are believed to have documented a few Tirthankaras and an ascetic order similar to the shramana movement. (Note: Fisher: "The extreme antiquity of Jainism as a non-vedic, indigenous Indian religion is well documented. Ancient Hindu and Buddhist scriptures refer to Jainism as an existing tradition which began long before Mahavira.")

===== Buddhism =====
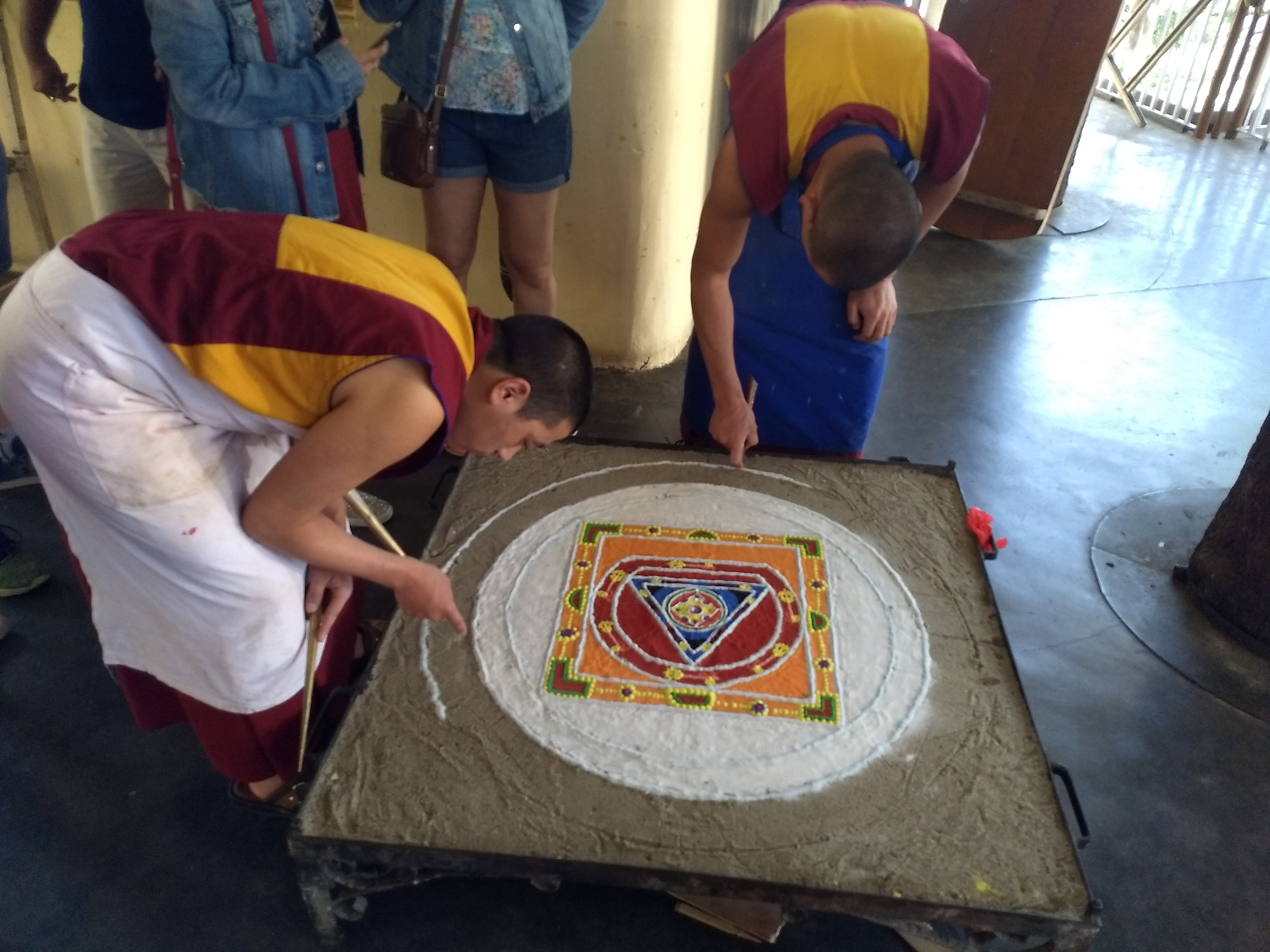
Buddhist Monks creating a traditional sand mandala made from coloured sand

Buddhism was historically founded by Siddhartha Gautama, a Kshatriya prince-turned-ascetic, and was spread beyond India through missionaries. It later experienced a decline in India, but survived in Nepal and Sri Lanka, and remains more widespread in Southeast and East Asia.

Gautama Buddha, who was called an "awakened one" (Buddha), was born into the Shakya clan living at Kapilavastu and Lumbini in what is now southern Nepal. The Buddha was born at Lumbini, as emperor Ashoka's Lumbini pillar records, just before the kingdom of Magadha (which traditionally is said to have lasted from c. 546–324 BCE) rose to power. The Shakyas claimed Angirasa and Gautama Maharishi lineage, via descent from the royal lineage of Ayodhya.

Buddhism emphasises enlightenment (nibbana, nirvana) and liberation from the rounds of rebirth. This objective is pursued through two schools, Theravada, the Way of the Elders (practiced in Sri Lanka, Burma, Thailand, SE Asia, etc.) and Mahayana, the Greater Way (practiced in Tibet, China, Japan, etc.). There may be some differences in the practice between the two schools in reaching the objective.

==== Spread of Jainism and Buddhism (500–200 BCE) ====
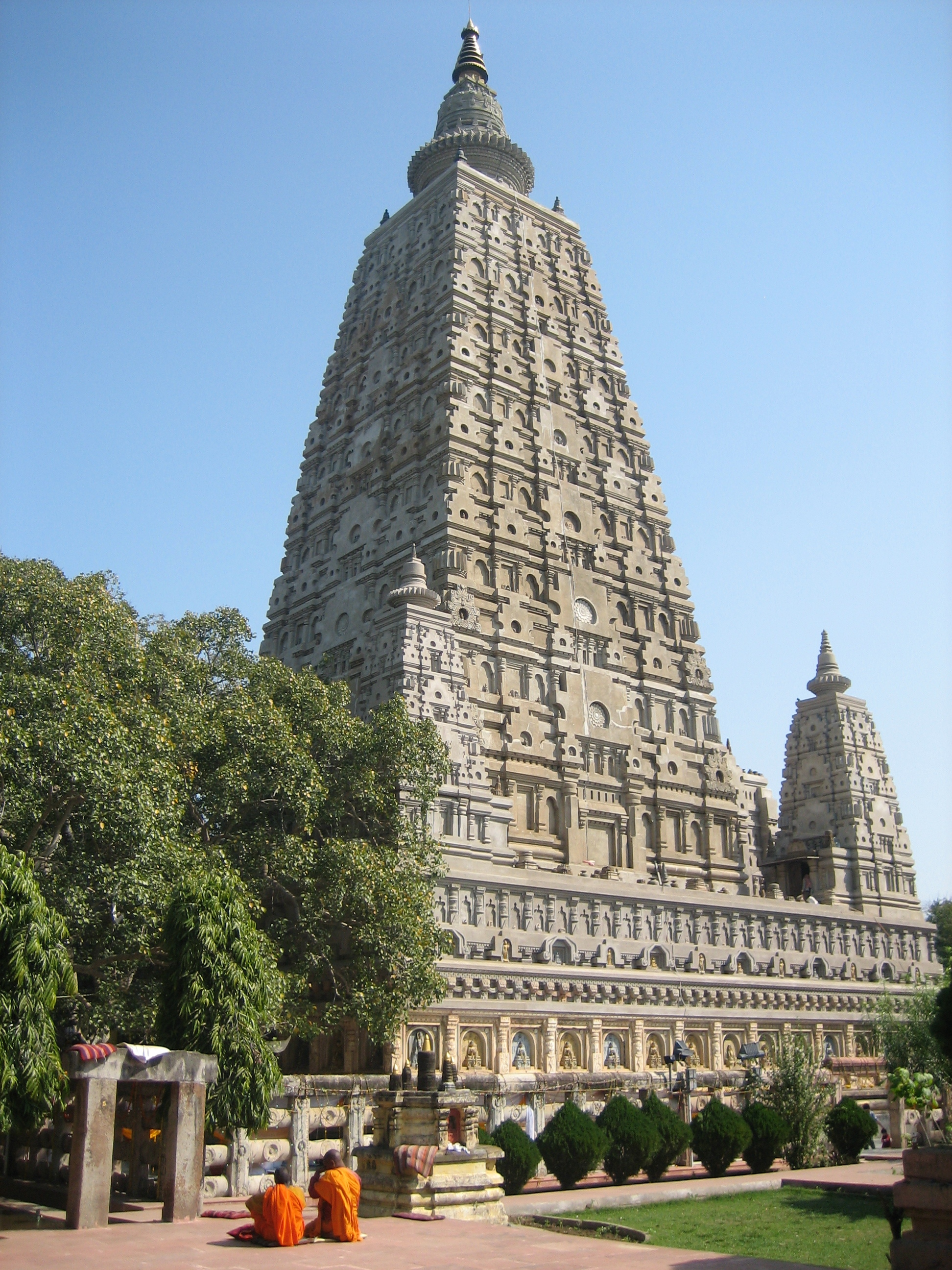
Buddhist Mahabodhi Temple, Bodh Gaya, Bihar

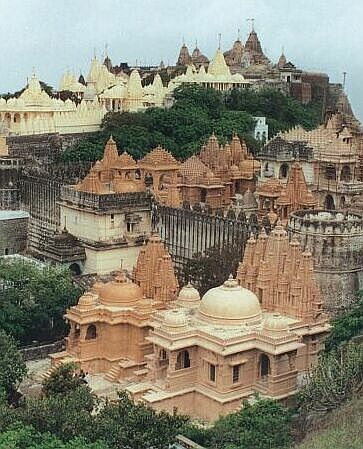
Jain Palitana temples, Shatrunjaya hill, Gujarat

Both Jainism and Buddhism spread throughout India during the period of the Magadha empire.

Buddhism flourished during the reign of Ashoka of the Maurya Empire, who patronised Buddhist teachings and unified the Indian subcontinent in the 3rd century BCE. He sent missionaries abroad, allowing Buddhism to spread across Asia.

Jainism began its golden period during the reign of Emperor Kharavela of Kalinga in the 2nd century BCE due to his significant patronage of the religion. His reign is considered a period of growth and influence for the religion, although Jainism had flourished for centuries before and continued to develop in prominence after his time.

==== Dravidian culture ====
The early Dravidian religion constituted of non-Vedic form of Hinduism in that they were either historically or are at present Āgamic. The Agamas are non-vedic in origin and have been dated either as post-vedic texts. or as pre-vedic oral compositions. The Agamas are a collection of Tamil and later Sanskrit scriptures chiefly constituting the methods of temple construction and creation of murti, worship means of deities, philosophical doctrines, meditative practices, attainment of sixfold desires and four kinds of yoga. The worship of tutelary deity, sacred flora and fauna in Hinduism is also recognised as a survival of the pre-Vedic Dravidian religion.

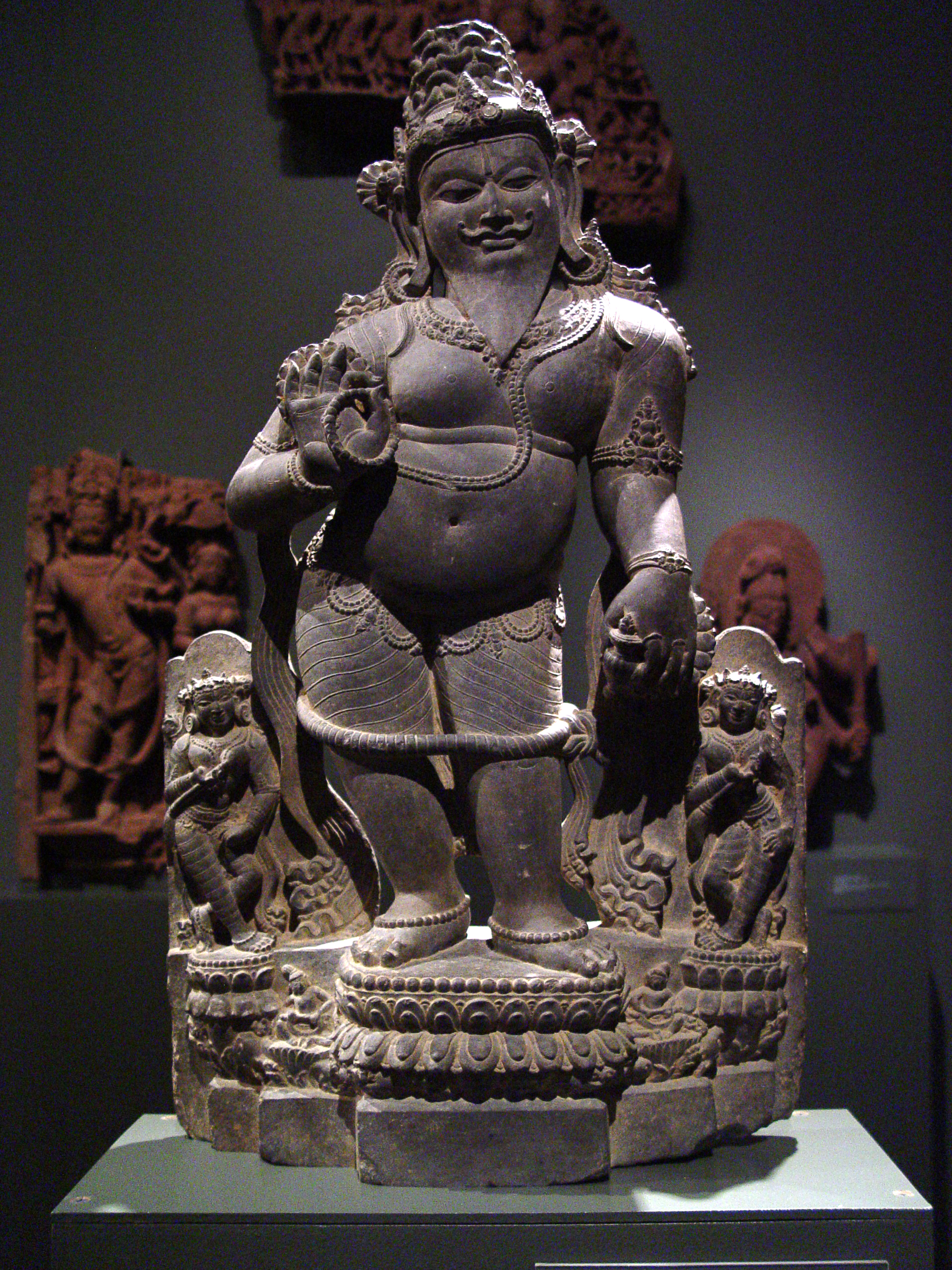
Saga Agastya, father of Tamil literature

Ancient Tamil grammatical works Tolkappiyam, the ten anthologies Pattuppāṭṭu, the eight anthologies Eṭṭuttokai also sheds light on early religion of ancient Dravidians. Seyon was glorified as the red god seated on the blue peacock, who is ever young and resplendent, as the favored god of the Tamils. Sivan was also seen as the supreme God. Early iconography of Seyyon and Sivan and their association with native flora and fauna goes back to Indus Valley Civilisation. The Sangam landscape was classified into five categories, thinais, based on the mood, the season and the land. Tolkappiyam, mentions that each of these thinai had an associated deity such Seyyon in Kurinji-the hills, Thirumaal in Mullai-the forests, and Kotravai in Marutham-the plains, and Wanji-ko in the Neithal-the coasts and the seas. Other gods mentioned were Mayyon and Vaali who were all assimilated into Hinduism over time. Dravidian linguistic influence on early Vedic religion is evident, many of these features are already present in the oldest known Indo-Aryan language, the language of the Rigveda (c. 1500 BCE), which also includes over a dozen words borrowed from Dravidian. This represents an early religious and cultural fusion (Note: Lockard: "The encounters that resulted from Aryan migration brought together several very different peoples and cultures, reconfiguring Indian society. Over many centuries a fusion of Aryan and Dravidian occurred, a complex process that historians have labeled the Indo-Aryan synthesis." Lockard: "Hinduism can be seen historically as a synthesis of Aryan beliefs with Harappan and other Dravidian traditions that developed over many centuries.") or synthesis between ancient Dravidians and Indo-Aryans, which became more evident over time with sacred iconography, traditions, philosophy, flora, and fauna that went on to influence Hinduism, Buddhism, Charvaka, Sramana, and Jainism.

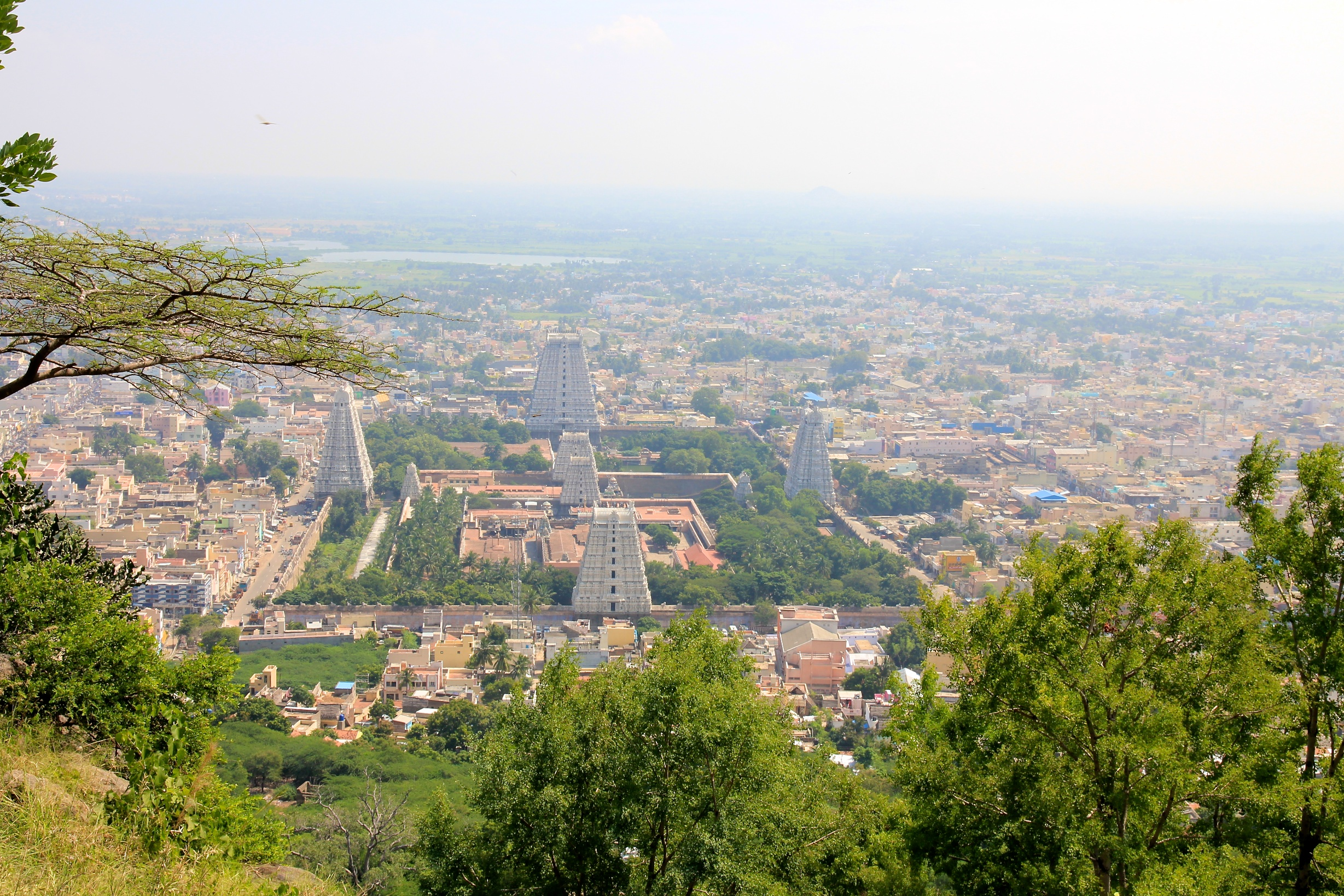
Typical layout of Dravidian architecture which evolved from koyil as king's residence.

Throughout Tamilakam, a king was considered to be divine by nature and possessed religious significance. The king was 'the representative of God on earth' and lived in a "koyil", which means the "residence of a god". The Modern Tamil word for temple is koil. Titual worship was also given to kings. Modern words for god like "kō" ("king"), "iṟai" ("emperor"), and "āṇḍavar" ("conqueror") now primarily refer to gods. These elements were incorporated later into Hinduism like the legendary marriage of Shiva to Queen Mīnātchi who ruled Madurai or Wanji-ko, a god who later merged into Indra. Tolkappiyar refers to the Three Crowned Kings as the "Three Glorified by Heaven". In the Dravidian-speaking South, the concept of divine kingship led to the assumption of major roles by state and temple.

The cult of the mother goddess is treated as an indication of a society which venerated femininity. This mother goddess was conceived as a virgin, one who has given birth to all and one, typically associated with Shaktism. The temples of the Sangam days, mainly of Madurai, seem to have had priestesses to the deity, which also appear predominantly a goddess. In the Sangam literature, there is an elaborate description of the rites performed by the Kurava priestess in the shrine Palamutircholai. Among the early Dravidians the practice of erecting memorial stones Natukal or Hero Stone had appeared, and it continued for quite a long time after the Sangam age, down to about 16th century. It was customary for people who sought victory in war to worship these hero stones to bless them with victory.

=== Epic and Early Puranic Period (200 BCE – 500 CE) ===
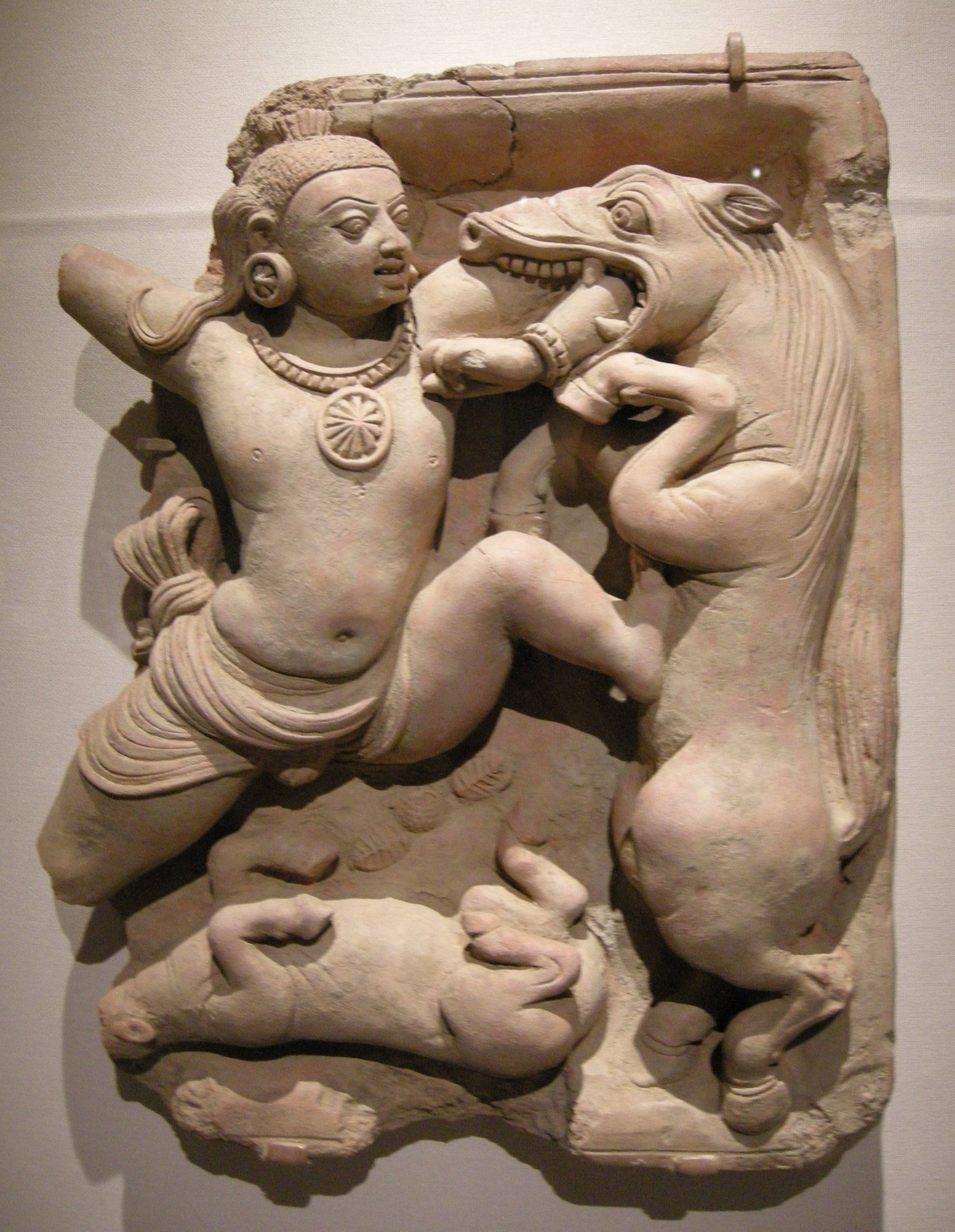
Krishna fighting the horse demon Keshi, 5th century, Gupta period.

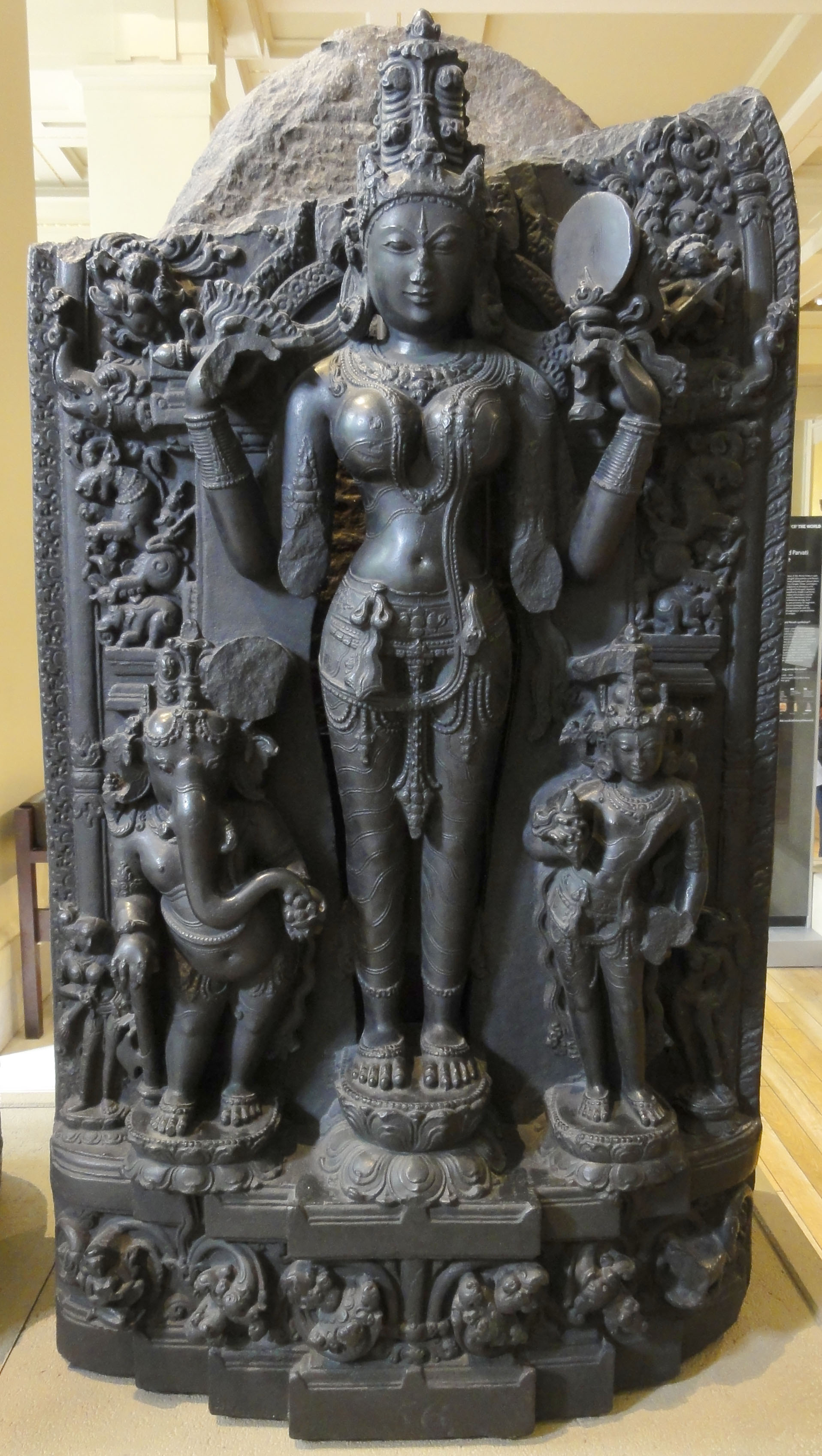
A basalt statue of Lalita flanked by Gaṇeśa and Kārttikeya, Pala era.

Flood and Muesse take the period between 200 BCE and 500 BCE as a separate period, in which the epics and the first puranas were being written. Michaels takes a greater timespan, namely the period between 200 BCE and 1100 CE, which saw the rise of so-called "Classical Hinduism", with its "golden age" during the Gupta Empire.

According to Alf Hiltebeitel, a period of consolidation in the development of Hinduism took place between the time of the late Vedic Upanishad (c. 500 BCE) and the period of the rise of the Guptas (c. 320–467 CE), which he calls the "Hindus synthesis", "Brahmanic synthesis", or "orthodox synthesis". It develops in interaction with other religions and peoples:

The emerging self-definitions of Hinduism were forged in the context of continuous interaction with heterodox religions (Buddhists, Jains, Ajivikas) throughout this whole period, and with foreign people (Yavanas, or Greeks; Sakas, or Scythians; Pahlavas, or Parthians; and Kusanas, or Kushans) from the third phase on [between the Mauryan empire and the rise of the Guptas].

The end of the Vedantic period around the 2nd century CE spawned a number of branches that furthered Vedantic philosophy, and which ended up being seminaries in their own right. Prominent among these developers were Yoga, Dvaita, Advaita, and the medieval Bhakti movement.

==== Smriti ====
The smriti texts of the period between 200 BCE and 100 CE proclaim the authority of the Vedas, and "nonrejection of the Vedas comes to be one of the most important touchstones for defining Hinduism over and against the heterodoxies, which rejected the Vedas." Of the six Hindu darsanas, the Mimamsa and the Vedanta "are rooted primarily in the Vedic sruti tradition and are sometimes called smarta schools in the sense that they develop smarta orthodox current of thoughts that are based, like smriti, directly on sruti." According to Hiltebeitel, "the consolidation of Hinduism takes place under the sign of bhakti." It is the Bhagavadgita that seals this achievement. The result is a universal achievement that may be called smarta. It views Shiva and Vishnu as "complementary in their functions but ontologically identical".

==== Vedanta – Brahma sutras (200 BCE) ====
In earlier writings, Sanskrit 'Vedānta' simply referred to the Upanishads, the most speculative and philosophical of the Vedic texts. However, in the medieval period of Hinduism, the word Vedānta came to mean the school of philosophy that interpreted the Upanishads. Traditional Vedānta considers shabda pramāṇa (scriptural evidence) as the most authentic means of knowledge, while pratyakṣa (perception) and anumāna (logical inference) are considered to be subordinate (but valid).

The systematisation of Vedantic ideas into one coherent treatise was undertaken by Badarāyana in the Brahma Sutras which was composed around 200 BCE. The cryptic aphorisms of the Brahma Sutras are open to a variety of interpretations. This resulted in the formation of numerous Vedanta schools, each interpreting the texts in its own way and producing its own sub-commentaries.

==== Indian philosophy ====
After 200 CE several schools of thought were formally codified in Indian philosophy, including Samkhya, Yoga, Nyaya, Vaisheshika, Mimāṃsā and Advaita Vedanta. Hinduism, otherwise a highly polytheistic, pantheistic or monotheistic religion, also tolerated atheistic schools. The thoroughly materialistic and anti-religious philosophical Cārvāka school that originated around the 6th century BCE is the most explicitly atheistic school of Indian philosophy. Cārvāka is classified as a nāstika ("heterodox") system; it is not included among the six schools of Hinduism generally regarded as orthodox. It is noteworthy as evidence of a materialistic movement within Hinduism. Our understanding of Cārvāka philosophy is fragmentary, based largely on criticism of the ideas by other schools, and it is no longer a living tradition. Other Indian philosophies generally regarded as atheistic include Samkhya and Mimāṃsā.

==== Hindu literature ====
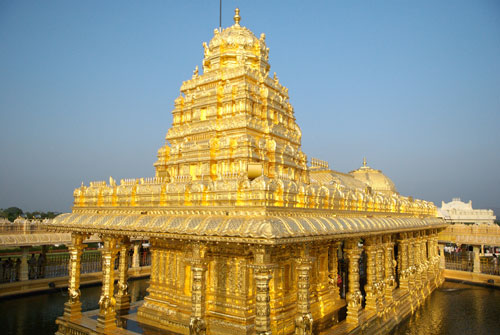
The Golden Temple of Mahalakshmi at Vellore.

Two of Hinduism's most revered epics, the Mahabharata and Ramayana were compositions of this period. Devotion to particular deities was reflected from the composition of texts composed to their worship. For example, the Ganapati Purana was written for devotion to Ganapati (or Ganesha). Popular deities of this era were Shiva, Vishnu, Durga, Surya, Skanda, and Ganesha (including the forms/incarnations of these deities).

In the latter Vedantic period, several texts were also composed as summaries/attachments to the Upanishads. These texts collectively called as Puranas allowed for a divine and mythical interpretation of the world, not unlike the ancient Hellenic or Roman religions. Legends and epics with a multitude of gods and goddesses with human-like characteristics were composed.

==== Jainism and Buddhism ====
The Gupta period marked a watershed of Indian culture: the Guptas performed Vedic sacrifices to legitimise their rule, but they also patronised Buddhism, which continued to provide an alternative to Brahmanical orthodoxy. Buddhism continued to have a significant presence in some regions of India until the 12th century.

There were several Buddhistic kings who worshiped Vishnu, such as the Gupta Empire, Pala Empire, Chalukyas, Somavanshi, and Satavahana. Buddhism survived followed by Hindus.

==== Tantra ====
Tantrism originated in the early centuries CE and developed into a fully articulated tradition by the end of the Gupta period. According to Michaels this was the "Golden Age of Hinduism" (c. 320–650 CE), which flourished during the Gupta Empire (320 to 550 CE) until the fall of the Harsha Empire (606 to 647 CE). During this period, power was centralised, along with a growth of far distance trade, standardisarion of legal procedures, and general spread of literacy. Mahayana Buddhism flourished, but the orthodox Brahmana culture began to be rejuvenated by the patronage of the Gupta Dynasty. The position of the Brahmans was reinforced, and the first Hindu temples emerged during the late Gupta age.

=== Medieval and Late Puranic Period (500–1500 CE) ===
==== Late-Classical Period (c. 650–1100 CE) ====
After the end of the Gupta Empire and the collapse of the Harsha Empire, power became decentralised in India. Several larger kingdoms emerged, with "countless vasal states". (Note: In the east the Pala Empire (770–1125 CE), in the west and north the Gurjara-Pratihara (7th–10th century), in the southwest the Rashtrakuta Dynasty (752–973), in the Dekkhan the Chalukya dynasty (7th–8th century), and in the south the Pallava dynasty (7th–9th century) and the Chola dynasty (9th century).) The kingdoms were ruled via a feudal system. Smaller kingdoms were dependent on the protection of the larger kingdoms. "The great king was remote, was exalted and deified", as reflected in the Tantric Mandala, which could also depict the king as the centre of the mandala.

The disintegration of central power also lead to regionalisation of religiosity, and religious rivalry. (Note: This resembles the development of Chinese Chán during the An Lu-shan rebellion and the Five Dynasties and Ten Kingdoms Period (907–960/979), during which power became decentralised end new Chán-schools emerged.) Local cults and languages were enhanced, and the influence of "Brahmanic ritualistic Hinduism" was diminished. Rural and devotional movements arose, along with Shaivism, Vaisnavism, Bhakti, and Tantra, though "sectarian groupings were only at the beginning of their development". Religious movements had to compete for recognition by the local lords. Buddhism lost its position, and began to disappear in India.

===== Vedanta =====
In the same period Vedanta changed, incorporating Buddhist thought and its emphasis on consciousness and the working of the mind. Buddhism, which was supported by the ancient Indian urban civilisation lost influence to the traditional religions, which were rooted in the countryside. In Bengal, Buddhism was even prosecuted. But at the same time, Buddhism was incorporated into Hinduism, when Gaudapada used Buddhist philosophy to reinterpret the Upanishads. This also marked a shift from Atman and Brahman as a "living substance" to "maya-vada" (Note: The term "maya-vada" is primarily being used by non-Advaitins. See), where Atman and Brahman are seen as "pure knowledge-consciousness". According to Scheepers, it is this "maya-vada" view which has come to dominate Indian thought.

===== Buddhism =====
Between 400 and 1000 CE Hinduism expanded as the decline of Buddhism in India continued. Buddhism subsequently became effectively extinct in India but survived in Nepal and Sri Lanka.

===== Bhakti =====
The Bhakti movement began with the emphasis on the worship of God, regardless of one's status – whether priestly or laypeople, men or women, higher social status or lower social status. The movements were mainly centered on the forms of Vishnu (Rama and Krishna) and Shiva. There were however popular devotees of this era of Durga. The best-known proponents of this movement were the Alvars and the Nayanars from southern India. The most popular Shaiva teacher of the south was Basava, while of the north it was Gorakhnath. Female saints include figures like Akkamadevi, Lalleshvari and Molla.

The Alvars (Tamil: ஆழ்வார்கள், āḻvārkaḷ [aːɻʋaːr], those immersed in god) were the Tamil poet-saints of south India, who lived between the 6th and 9th centuries CE and espoused "emotional devotion" or bhakti to Vishnu-Krishna in their songs of longing, ecstasy and service. The most popular Vaishnava teacher of the south was Ramanuja, while of the north it was Ramananda.

Several important icons were women. For example, within the Mahanubhava sect, the women outnumbered the men, and administration was many times composed mainly of women. Mirabai is the most popular female saint in India.

Sri Vallabha Acharya (1479–1531) is a very important figure from this era. He founded the Shuddha Advaita (Pure Non-dualism) school of Vedanta thought.

According to The Centre for Cultural Resources and Training,

Vaishanava bhakti literature was an all-India phenomenon, which started in the 6th–7th century A.D. in the Tamil-speaking region of South India, with twelve Alvar (one immersed in God) saint-poets, who wrote devotional songs. The religion of Alvar poets, which included a woman poet, Andal, was devotion to God through love (bhakti), and in the ecstasy of such devotions they sang hundreds of songs which embodied both depth of feeling and felicity of expressions. (Note: The Centre for Cultural Resources and Training, Indian Literature Through the Ages Archived 15 May 2013 at the Wayback Machine)

==== Early Islamic rule (c. 1100–1500 CE) ====
In the 12th and 13th centuries, Turks and Afghans invaded parts of northern India and established the Delhi Sultanate in the former Rajput holdings. The subsequent Slave dynasty of Delhi managed to conquer large areas of northern India, approximately equal in extent to the ancient Gupta Empire, while the Khalji dynasty conquered most of central India but were ultimately unsuccessful in conquering and uniting the subcontinent. The Sultanate ushered in a period of Indian cultural renaissance. The resulting "Indo-Muslim" fusion of cultures left lasting syncretic monuments in architecture, music, literature, religion, and clothing.

===== Bhakti movement =====
During the 14th to 17th centuries, a great Bhakti movement swept through central and northern India, initiated by a loosely associated group of teachers or Sants. Ramananda, Ravidas, Srimanta Sankardeva, Chaitanya Mahaprabhu, Vallabha Acharya, Sur, Meera, Kabir, Tulsidas, Namdev, Dnyaneshwar, Tukaram, and other mystics spearheaded the Bhakti movement in the North while Annamacharya, Bhadrachala Ramadas, Tyagaraja, and others propagated Bhakti in the South. They taught that people could cast aside the heavy burdens of ritual and caste, and the subtle complexities of philosophy, and simply express their overwhelming love for God. This period was also characterised by a spate of devotional literature in vernacular prose and poetry in the ethnic languages of the various Indian states or provinces.

===== Lingayatism =====
Lingayatism is a distinct Shaivite tradition in India, established in the 12th century by the philosopher and social reformer Basavanna. The adherents of this tradition are known as Lingayats. The term is derived from Lingavantha in Kannada, meaning "one who wears Ishtalinga on their body" (Ishtalinga is the representation of the God). In Lingayat theology, Ishtalinga is an oval-shaped emblem symbolising Parasiva, the absolute reality. Contemporary Lingayatism follows a progressive reform–based theology propounded, which has great influence in South India, especially in the state of Karnataka.

===== Unifying Hinduism =====
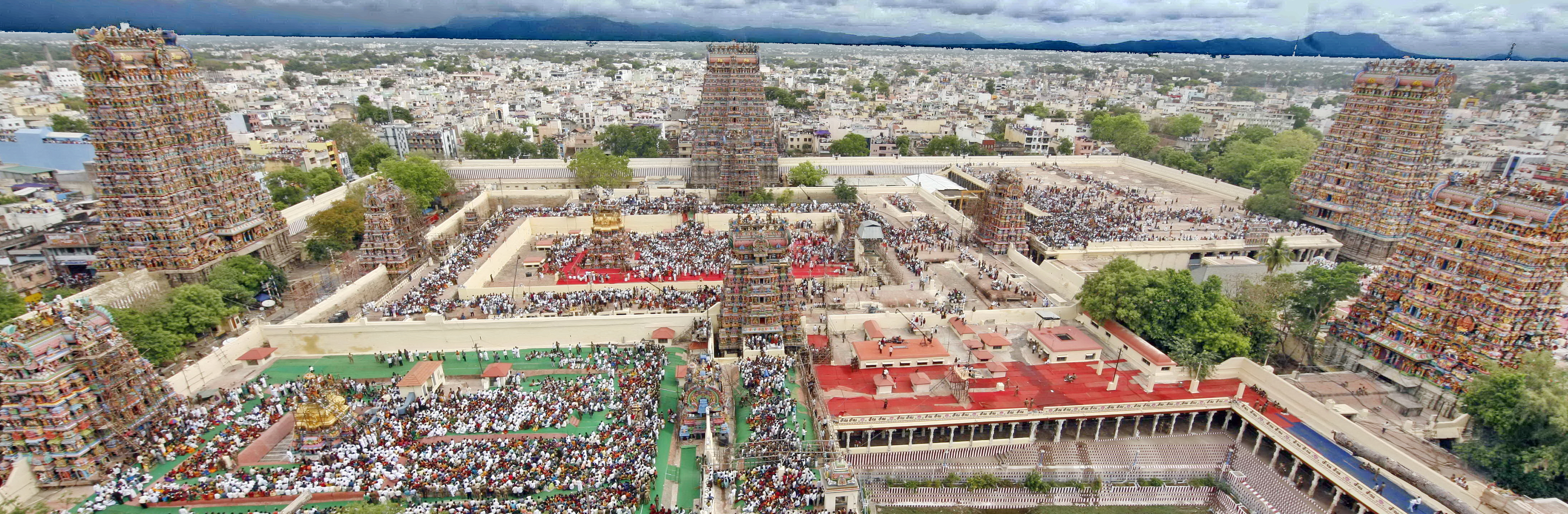
An aerial view of the Meenakshi Temple from the top of the southern gopuram, looking north. The temple was rebuilt by the Vijayanagar Empire.

According to Nicholson, already between the 12th and 16th century,

... certain thinkers began to treat as a single whole the diverse philosophival teachings of the Upanishads, epics, Puranas, and the schools known retrospectively as the "six systems" (saddarsana) of mainstream Hindu philosophy.

The tendency of "a blurring of philosophical distinctions" has also been noted by Mikel Burley. Lorenzen locates the origins of a distinct Hindu identity in the interaction between Muslims and Hindus, and a process of "mutual self-definition with a contrasting Muslim other", which started well before 1800. Both the Indian and the European thinkers who developed the term "Hinduism" in the 19th century were influenced by these philosophers.

===== Sikhism (15th century) =====
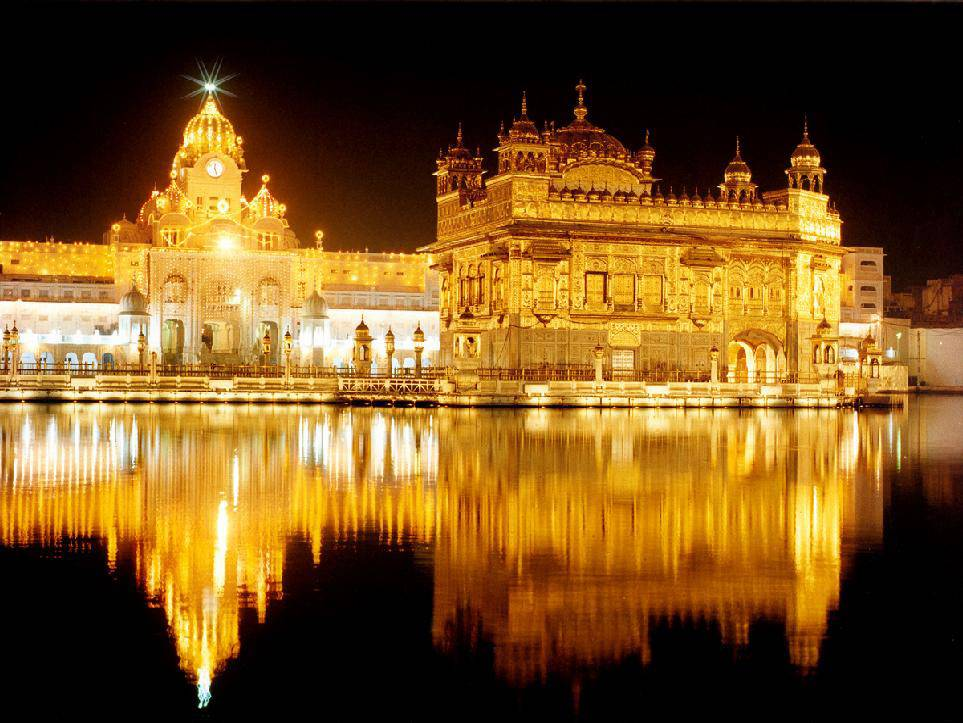
Harmandir Sahib (The Golden Temple) is culturally the most significant place of worship for the Sikhs.

Sikhism originated in 15th-century Punjab, Delhi Sultanate (present-day India and Pakistan) with the teachings of Nanak and nine successive gurus. The principal belief in Sikhism is faith in Vāhigurū— represented by the sacred symbol of ēk ōaṅkār [meaning one god]. Sikhism's traditions and teachings are distinctly associated with the history, society and culture of the Punjab. Adherents of Sikhism are known as Sikhs (students or disciples) and number over 25 million across the world.

=== Modern period (1500–present) ===
==== Early modern period ====
According to Gavin Flood, the modern period in India begins with the first contacts with western nations around 1500. The period of Mughal rule in India saw the rise of new forms of religiosity.

==== Modern India (after 1800) ====
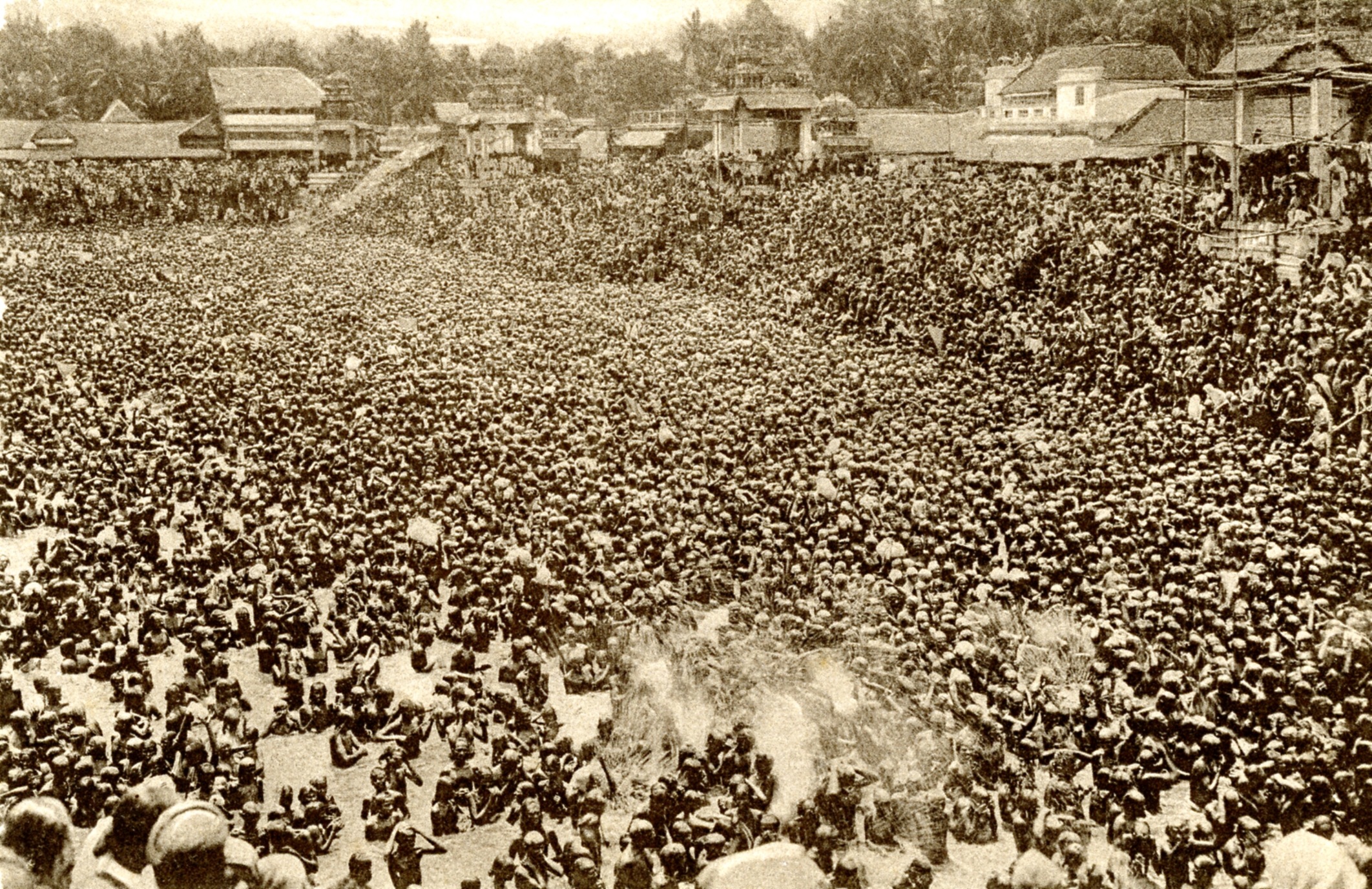
Mahamagam Festival is a holy festival celebrated once in twelve years in Tamil Nadu. Mahamagam Festival, which is held at Kumbakonam. This festival is also called as Kumbamela of South.

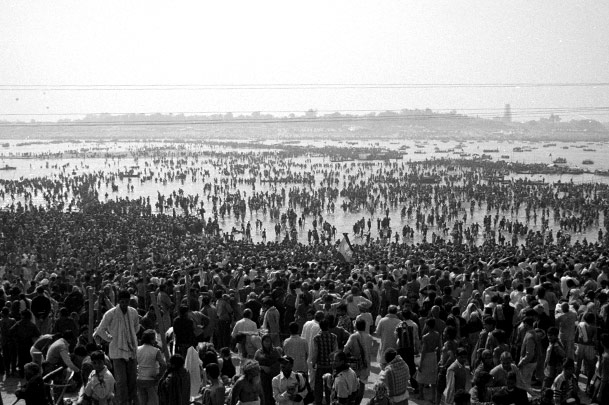
The largest religious gathering ever held on Earth, the 2001 Maha Kumbh Mela held in Prayag attracted around 70 million Hindus from around the world.

===== Hinduism =====
In the 19th century, under influence of the colonial forces, a synthetic vision of Hinduism was formulated by Raja Ram Mohan Roy, Swami Vivekananda, Sri Aurobindo, Sarvepalli Radhakrishnan and Mahatma Gandhi. These thinkers have tended to take an inclusive view of India's religious history, emphasising the similarities between the various Indian religions.

The modern era has given rise to dozens of Hindu saints with international influence. For example, Brahma Baba established the Brahma Kumaris, one of the largest new Hindu religious movements which teaches the discipline of Raja Yoga to millions. Representing traditional Gaudiya Vaishnavism, Prabhupada founded the Hare Krishna movement, another organisation with a global reach. In late 18th-century India, Swaminarayan founded the Swaminarayan Sampraday. Anandamurti, founder of the Ananda Marga, has also influenced many worldwide. Through the international influence of all of these new Hindu denominations, many Hindu practices such as yoga, meditation, mantra, divination, and vegetarianism have been adopted by new converts.

===== Jainism =====
Jainism continues to be an influential religion and Jain communities live in Indian states Gujarat, Rajasthan, Madhya Pradesh, Maharashtra, Karnataka, and Tamil Nadu. Jains authored several classical books in different Indian languages for a considerable period of time.

===== Buddhism =====
The Dalit Buddhist movement also referred to as Navayana is a 19th- and 20th-century Buddhist revival movement in India. It received its most substantial impetus from B. R. Ambedkar's call for the conversion of Dalits to Buddhism in 1956 and the opportunity to escape the caste-based society that considered them to be the lowest in the hierarchy.

== Similarities and differences ==
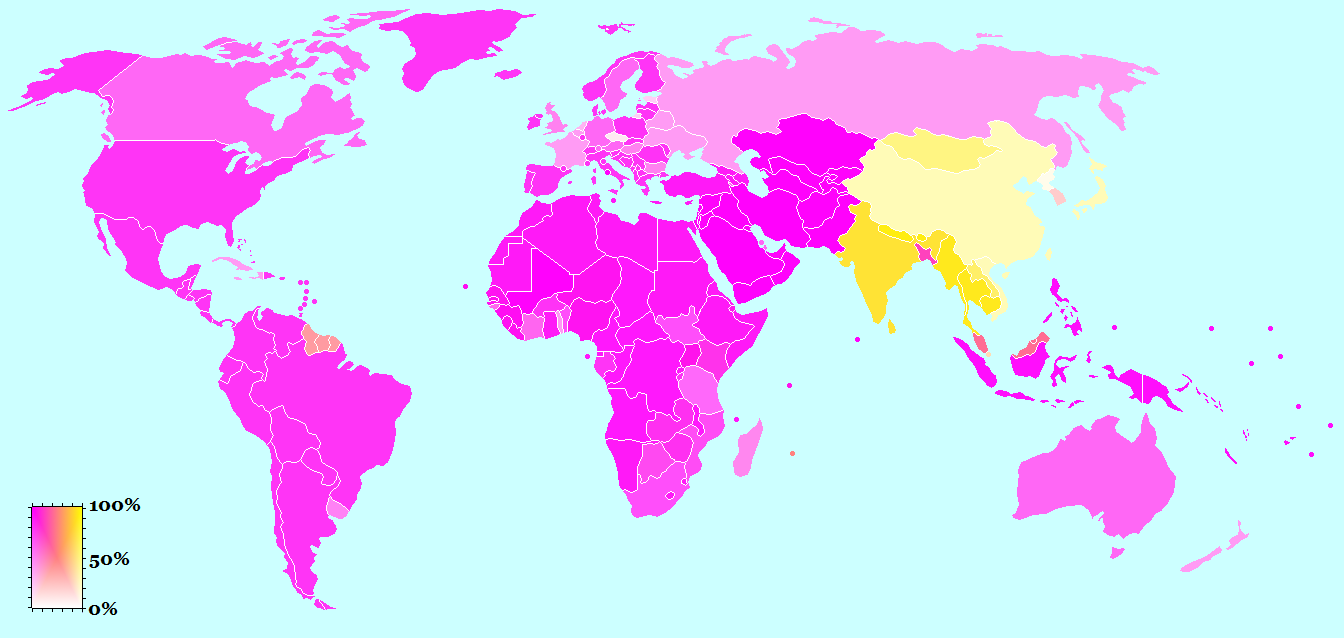
Map showing the prevalence of Abrahamic (pink) and Indian religions (yellow) in each country

According to Tilak, the religions of India can be interpreted "differentially" or "integrally", that is by either highlighting the differences or the similarities. According to Sherma and Sarma, western Indologists have tended to emphasise the differences, while Indian Indologists have tended to emphasise the similarities.

=== Similarities ===
Hinduism, Buddhism, Jainism, and Sikhism share certain key concepts, which are interpreted differently by different groups and individuals. Until the 19th century, adherents of those various religions did not tend to label themselves as in opposition to each other, but "perceived themselves as belonging to the same extended cultural family."

==== Dharma ====
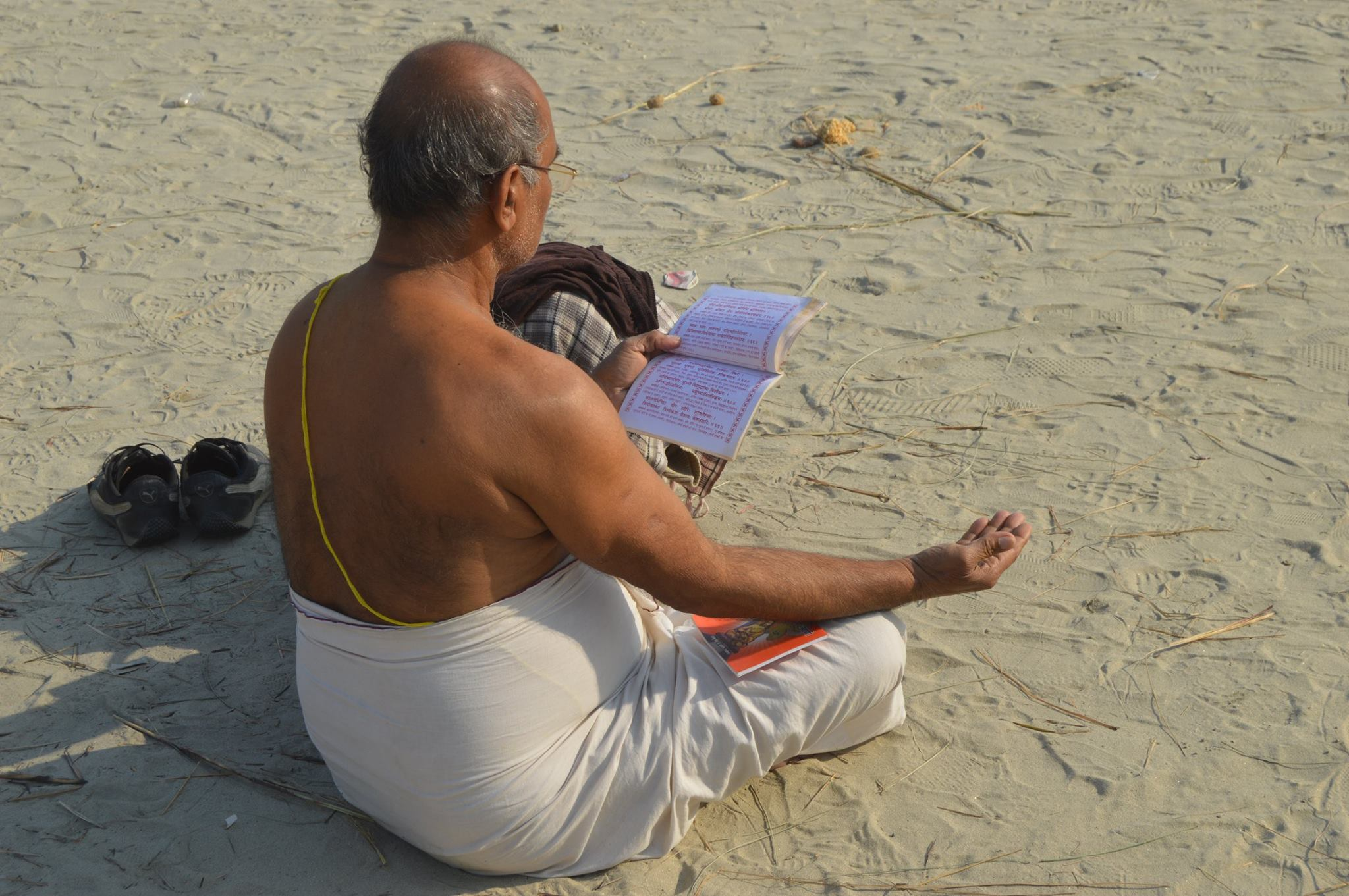
A devotee facing the Ganga, reading a stack of holy books ("Chalisa" of various god) at the Kumbh Mela

The spectrum of these religions are called Dharmic religions because of their overlap over the core concept of Dharma. It has various meanings depending on the context. For example it could mean duty, righteousness, spiritual teachings, conduct, etc.

==== Soteriology ====
Hinduism, Buddhism, Jainism, and Sikhism share the concept of moksha, liberation from the cycle of rebirth. They differ, however, on the exact nature of this liberation.

==== Ritual ====
Common traits can also be observed in ritual. The head-anointing ritual of abhiseka is of importance in three of these distinct traditions, excluding Sikhism (in Buddhism it is found within Vajrayana). Other noteworthy rituals are the cremation of the dead, the wearing of vermilion on the head by married women, and various marital rituals. In literature, many classical narratives and puranas have Hindu, Buddhist or Jain versions. (Note: cf. Encyclopædia Britannica, s.v. "Jainism > Jainism, Hinduism, and Buddhism") All four traditions have notions of karma, dharma, samsara, moksha and various forms of Yoga.

==== Mythology ====
Rama is a heroic figure in all of these religions. In Hinduism he is the God-incarnate in the form of a princely king; in Buddhism, he is a Bodhisattva-incarnate; in Jainism, he is the perfect human being. Among the Buddhist Ramayanas are: Vessantarajataka, Reamker, Ramakien, Phra Lak Phra Lam, Hikayat Seri Rama, etc. There also exists the Khamti Ramayana among the Khamti tribe of Asom wherein Rama is an Avatar of a Bodhisattva who incarnates to punish the demon king Ravana (B.Datta 1993). The Tai Ramayana is another book retelling the divine story in Asom.

=== Differences ===
Critics point out that there exist vast differences between and even within the various Indian religions. All major religions are composed of innumerable sects and subsects.

==== Mythology ====
Indian mythology also reflects the competition between the various Indian religions. A popular story tells how Vajrapani kills Mahesvara, a manifestation of Shiva depicted as an evil being. The story occurs in several scriptures, most notably the Sarvatathagatatattvasamgraha and the Vajrapany-abhiseka-mahatantra. (Note: The story begins with the transformation of the Bodhisattva Samantabhadra into Vajrapani by Vairocana, the cosmic Buddha, receiving a vajra and the name "Vajrapani". Vairocana then requests Vajrapani to generate his adamantine family, to establish a mandala. Vajrapani refuses, because Mahesvara (Shiva) "is deluding beings with his deceitfull religious doctrines and engaging in all kinds of violent criminal conduct". Mahesvara and his entourage are dragged to Mount Sumeru, and all but Mahesvara submit. Vajrapani and Mahesvara engage in a magical combat, which is won by Vajrapani. Mahesvara's retinue become part of Vairocana's mandala, except for Mahesvara, who is killed, and his life transferred to another realm where he becomes a buddha named Bhasmesvara-nirghosa, the "Soundless Lord of Ashes".) According to Kalupahana, the story "echoes" the story of the conversion of Ambattha. It is to be understood in the context of the competition between Buddhist institutions and Shaivism.

== Āstika and nāstika categorisation ==
Āstika and nāstika are variously defined terms sometimes used to categorise Indian religions but we need to keep some caveats in mind.

Satoshi Ogura argues – We have found no Sanskrit doxography completed up to the end of the sixteenth century that distinguishes only Nyāya, Vaiśeṣika, Sāṃkhya, Yoga, Mīmāṃsā, and Vedānta as orthodox systems that acknowledge the revelation of the Vedas. To put it mildly, such a categorisation was not mainstream in Indian philosophy. In her dissertation dealing with the works by the Mughal prince Dārā Shukūh, Supriya Gandhi has, in contrast, asserted that Roy rather inherited religious discourses in early modern Persian literature in writing his treatises on religions, noting the similarity of Roy's word-usage to that of Dārā. We can say that the case of ṣaḍdarśana shares a common feature with that of Roy's thought, i.e., that a “traditional” Indic concept that has been discussed as a Western or colonial invention had probably sprouted in the late medieval or early modern cosmopolitan culture on the subcontinent before the time of Western impact. We thus should keep in mind the tendency of classification of Indic knowledge in Persianate discourses and its legacies in modern writings in both India and the Western world.

The traditional definition, followed by Adi Shankara, classifies religions and persons as āstika and nāstika according to whether they accept the authority of the main Hindu texts, the Vedas, as supreme revealed scriptures, or not. By this definition, Nyaya, Vaisheshika, Samkhya, Yoga, Purva Mimamsa and Vedanta are classified as āstika schools, while Charvaka is classified as a nāstika school. Buddhism and Jainism are also thus classified as nāstika religions since they do not accept the authority of the Vedas.

Another set of definitions—notably distinct from the usage of Hindu philosophy—loosely characterise āstika as "theist" and nāstika as "atheist". By these definitions, Sāṃkhya can be considered a nāstika philosophy, though it is traditionally classed among the Vedic āstika schools. From this point of view, Buddhism and Jainism remain nāstika religions.

Buddhists and Jains have disagreed that they are nastika and have redefined the phrases āstika and nāstika in their own view. Jains assign the term nastika to one who is ignorant of the meaning of the religious texts, or those who deny the existence of the soul.

== Use of term "Dharmic religions" ==
Frawley and Malhotra use the term "Dharmic traditions" to highlight the similarities between the various Indian religions. (Note: Occasionally the term is also being used by other authors. David Westerlund: "... may provide some possibilities for co-operation with Sikhs, Jains and Buddhists, who like Hindus are regarded as adherents of 'dharmic' religions.") According to Frawley, "all religions in India have been called the Dharma", and can be

...put under the greater umbrella of "Dharmic traditions" which we can see as Hinduism or the spiritual traditions of India in the broadest sense.

According to Paul Hacker, as described by Halbfass, the term "dharma"

...assumed a fundamentally new meaning and function in modern Indian thought, beginning with Bankim Chandra Chatterjee in the nineteenth century. This process, in which dharma was presented as an equivalent of, but also a response to, the western notion of "religion", reflects a fundamental change in the Hindu sense of identity and in the attitude toward other religious and cultural traditions. The foreign tools of "religion" and "nation" became tools of self-definition, and a new and precarious sense of the "unity of Hinduism" and of national as well as religious identity took root.

The emphasis on the similarities and integral unity of the Dharmic faiths has been criticised for neglecting the vast differences between and even within the various Indian religions and traditions. According to Richard E. King it is typical of the "inclusivist appropriation of other traditions" of Neo-Vedanta:

The inclusivist appropriation of other traditions, so characteristic of neo-Vedanta ideology, appears on three basic levels. First, it is apparent in the suggestion that the (Advaita) Vedanta philosophy of Sankara (c. eighth century CE) constitutes the central philosophy of Hinduism. Second, in an Indian context, neo-Vedanta philosophy subsumes Buddhist philosophies in terms of its own Vedantic ideology. The Buddha becomes a member of the Vedanta tradition, merely attempting to reform it from within. Finally, at a global level, neo-Vedanta colonizes the religious traditions of the world by arguing for the centrality of a non-dualistic position as the philosophia perennis underlying all cultural differences.

The "Council of Dharmic Faiths" (UK) regards Zoroastrianism, while not originating in the Indian subcontinent, also as a Dharmic religion.

== Status of non-Hindus in the Republic of India ==
The inclusion of Buddhists, Jains, and Sikhs within Hinduism is part of the Indian legal system. The 1955 Hindu Marriage Act "[defines] as Hindus all Buddhists, Jains, Sikhs and anyone who is not a Christian, Muslim, Parsee (Zoroastrian) or Jew." And the Indian Constitution says that "reference to Hindus shall be construed as including a reference to persons professing the Sikh, Jaina or Buddhist religion."

In a judicial reminder, the Indian Supreme Court observed Sikhism and Jainism to be sub-sects or special faiths within the larger Hindu fold, (Note: In various codified customary laws like Hindu Marriage Act, Hindu Succession Act, Hindu Adoption and Maintenance Act and other laws of pre and post-Constitution period, the definition of 'Hindu' included all sects and sub-sects of Hindu religions including Sikhs and Jains) and that Jainism is a denomination within the Hindu fold. (Note: The Supreme Court observed in a judgment pertaining to case of Bal Patil vs. Union of India: "Thus, 'Hinduism' can be called a general religion and common faith of India whereas 'Jainism' is a special religion formed on the basis of quintessence of Hindu religion. Jainism places greater emphasis on non-violence ('Ahimsa') and compassion ('Karuna'). Their only difference from Hindus is that Jains do not believe in any creator like God but worship only the perfect human-being whom they called Tirathankar.") Although the Indian Government counted Jains in India as a major religious community right from the first Census conducted in 1873, after independence in 1947 Sikhs and Jains were not treated as national minorities. (Note: The so-called minority communities like Sikhs and Jains were not treated as national minorities at the time of framing the Constitution.) In 2005, the Supreme Court of India declined to issue a writ of mandamus granting Jains the status of a religious minority throughout India. The Court however left it to the respective states to decide on the minority status of Jain religion. (Note: In an extra-judicial observation not forming part of the judgment the court observed: "Thus, 'Hinduism' can be called a general religion and common faith of India whereas 'Jainism' is a special religion formed on the basis of quintessence of Hindu religion. Jainism places greater emphasis on non-violence ('Ahimsa') and compassion ('Karuna'). Their only difference from Hindus is that Jains do not believe in any creator like God but worship only the perfect human-being whom they called Tirathankar.")

However, some individual states have over the past few decades differed on whether Jains, Buddhists, and Sikhs are religious minorities or not, by either pronouncing judgments or passing legislation. One example is the judgment passed by the Supreme Court in 2006, in a case pertaining to the state of Uttar Pradesh, which declared Jainism to be indisputably distinct from Hinduism, but mentioned that, "The question as to whether the Jains are part of the Hindu religion is open to debate. However, the Supreme Court also noted various court cases that have held Jainism to be a distinct religion.

Another example is the Gujarat Freedom of Religion Bill, that is an amendment to a legislation that sought to define Jains and Buddhists as denominations within Hinduism. (Note: Gujarat Freedom of religions Act, 2003) Ultimately on 31 July 2007, finding it not in conformity with the concept of freedom of religion as embodied in Article 25 (1) of the Constitution, Governor Naval Kishore Sharma returned the Gujarat Freedom of Religion (Amendment) Bill, 2006 citing the widespread protests by the Jains as well as extrajudicial observation that Jainism is a "special religion formed on the basis of quintessence of Hindu religion by the Supreme Court." (Note: The Times of India, 11 Mar, 2008 In his letter dated 27 July 2007 he had said Jainism has been regarded as "special religion formed on the basis of quintessence of Hindu religion by the Supreme Court".)

== See also ==
- Abrahamic religions, a similar term used to refer Judaism, Christianity, and Islam
- Ahimsa
- Bon
- Demographics of India
- Indology
- Iranian religions
- Kalasha (religion)
- Proto-Indo-European mythology
- Proto-Indo-Iranian religion
- Religion in India
  - Buddhism in India
  - Christianity in India
  - Hinduism in India
  - Jainism in India
  - Sikhism in India
  - Tribal religions in India
  - Zoroastrianism in India
- Religion in South Asia
- Sanamahism
- Taoic religions, a similar terms used to refer to East Asian religions such as Taoism, Shintoism and Muism
- Vegetarianism

== Sources ==
=== Printed sources ===
- Basham, A.L. (1967). The Wonder that was India. London: Sidgwick & Jackson.
- Burley, Mikel (2007), Classical Samkhya and Yoga: An Indian Metaphysics of Experience, Taylor & Francis
- Cavanaugh, William T. (2009), The Myth of Religious Violence: Secular Ideology and the Roots of Modern Conflict: Secular Ideology and the Roots of Modern Conflict, Oxford University Press
- Chatterjee, S.; Datta, D. (1984), An Introduction to Indian Philosophy (8th ed.), University of Calcutta, ASIN: B0007BFXK4
- Davidson, Ronald M. (2004), Indian Esoteric Buddhism: Social History of the Tantric Movement, Motilal Banarsidass Publ.
- Day, Terence P. (1982). The Conception of Punishment in Early Indian Literature. Ontario: Wilfrid Laurier University Press. ISBN 0-919812-15-5.
- Deussen, Paul (1966) [1906]. Philosophy of the Upanishads. New York: Dover Publications. ISBN 978-0-486-21616-4.
- Duchesne-Guillemin, Jacques (Summer 1963), "Heraclitus and Iran", History of Religions, 3 (1): 34–49, doi:10.1086/462470, S2CID 62860085
- Dundas, Paul (2002) [1992], The Jains (Second ed.), London and New York: Routledge, ISBN 0-415-26605-X, archived from the original on 2 July 2023
- Flood, Gavin D. (1996), An Introduction to Hinduism, Cambridge University Press, ISBN 978-0-521-43878-0, archived from the original on 23 December 2023
- Flood, Gavin; Olivelle, Patrick (2003), The Blackwell Companion to Hinduism, Malden: Blackwell
- Fowler, J.D. (1997), Hinduism: Beliefs and Practices, Sussex Academic Press, ISBN 1-898723-60-5
- Frawley, David (1990), From the River of Heaven: Hindu and Vedic Knowledge for the Modern Age, Berkeley, California: Book Passage Press, ISBN 1-878423-01-0
- Halbfass, Wilhelm (1995), Philology and Confrontation: Paul Hacker on Traditional and Modern Vedānta, SUNY Press
- Heehs, Peter (2002), Indian Religions: A Historical Reader of Spiritual Expression and Experience, New York: New York University Press, ISBN 978-0-8147-3650-0
- Hiltebeitel, Alf. "Hinduism". In Kitagawa (2002).
- Hiltebeitel, Alf. "Hinduism". In Kitagawa (2007).
- Hiltebeitel, Alf (2011). "The Indus Valley "Proto-Śiva", Re-examined through Reflections on the Goddess, the Buffalo, and the Symbolism of vāhanas". In Adluri, Vishwa; Bagchee, Joydeep (eds.). When the Goddess was a Woman: Mahabharata Ethnographies – Essays by Alf Hiltebeitel. Brill. ISBN 978-90-04-19380-2. Archived from the original on 20 January 2023.
- Holdrege, Barbara A. (2004), "Dharma", in Mittal, S.; Thursby, G. (eds.), The Hindu World, New York: Routledge, pp. 213–248, ISBN 0-415-21527-7
- Jain, Champat Rai (2008), Risabha Deva (2nd ed.), India: Bhagwan Rishabhdeo Granth Mala, ISBN 978-81-7772-022-8
- Jaini, Padmanabh S., ed. (2001). Collected Paper on Buddhist Studies. Motilal Banarsidass. ISBN 978-81-208-1776-0.
- Kalupahana, David J. (1994), A history of Buddhist philosophy, Delhi: Motilal Banarsidass Publishers Private Limited
- Khanna, Meenakshi (2007), Cultural History Of Medieval India, Berghahn Books
- King, Richard (1995). Early Advaita Vedānta and Buddhism: The Mahāyāna Context of the Gauḍapādīya-kārikā. SUNY Press.
- King, Richard (1999), Orientalism and Religion: Post-Colonial Theory, India and "The Mystic East", Routledge
- Kitagawa, Joseph (2002), The Religious Traditions of Asia: Religion, History, and Culture, Routledge, ISBN 978-1-136-87597-7, archived from the original on 11 January 2023
- Kitagawa, Joseph (2007), The Religious Traditions of Asia: Religion, History, and Culture, Routledge, ISBN 978-1-136-87590-8, archived from the original on 3 July 2023
- Krishnamurti, Bhadriraju (2003), The Dravidian Languages, Cambridge University Press, ISBN 0-521-77111-0
- Krishnananda (1994), A Short History of Religious and Philosophic Thought in India, Divine Life Society, archived from the original on 9 July 2021
- Kulke, Hermann; Rothermund, Dietmar (2004), A History of India, Routledge
- Larson, Gerald (1995). India's Agony Over Religion. SUNY Press. ISBN 978-0-7914-2411-7.
- Larson, Gerald James (December 2012), "The Issue of Not Being Different Enough: Some Reflections on Rajiv Malhotra's Being Different", International Journal of Hindu Studies, 16 (3): 311–322, doi:10.1007/s11407-012-9129-8, S2CID 144728948
- Lockard, Craig A. (2007). Societies, Networks, and Transitions. Vol. I: to 1500. Cengage Learning. ISBN 978-0-618-38612-3. Archived from the original on 3 July 2023.
- Lipner, Julis (1998), Hindus: their religious beliefs and practices, Routledge
- Lorenzen, David N. (2006), Who Invented Hinduism: Essays on Religion in History, Yoda Press, ISBN 978-81-902272-6-1
- Malhotra, Rajiv (2011), Being Different: An Indian Challenge to Western Universalism, HarperCollins Publishers India
- Mallinson, James (2007), The Khecarīvidyā of Ādinātha
- Marshall, John, ed. (1931). Mohenjo-Daro and the Indus Civilization: Being an Official Account of Archaeological Excavations at Mohenjo-Daro Carried Out by the Government of India Between the Years 1922 and 1927. London: Arthur Probsthain.
- McIntosh, Jane (2008). The Ancient Indus Valley: New Perspectives. ABC-CLIO. ISBN 978-1-57607-907-2.
- McRae, John (2003), Seeing Through Zen, The University Press Group
- Michaels, Axel (2004), Hinduism. Past and present, Princeton, New Jersey: Princeton University Press
- Misra, Amalendu (2004), Identity and Religion: Foundations of Anti-Islamism in India, SAGE
- Muesse, Mark William (2003), Great World Religions: Hinduism
- Muesse, Mark W. (2011), The Hindu Traditions: A Concise Introduction, Fortress Press
- Nakamura, Hajime (2004), A History of Early Vedanta Philosophy. Part Two, Delhi: Motilal Banarsidass Publishers Private Limited
- Nicholson, Andrew J. (2010), Unifying Hinduism: Philosophy and Identity in Indian Intellectual History, Columbia University Press
- Nussbaum, Martha C. (2009), The Clash Within: Democracy, Religious Violence, and India's Future, Harvard University Press, ISBN 978-0-674-03059-6
- Oberlies, T. (1998), Die Religion des Rgveda, Wien
- Olivelle, Patrick (1998), Upanis̥ads, Oxford University Press, ISBN 978-0-19-283576-5, archived from the original on 16 January 2024
- Olivelle, Patrick (2014), The Early Upanishads, Oxford University Press, ISBN 978-0-19-512435-4
- Panikkar, Raimundo (2001), The Vedic Experience: Mantramañjari, Bangalore: Motilal Banarsidass, ISBN 81-208-1280-8
- Possehl, Gregory L. (2002). The Indus Civilization: A Contemporary Perspective. Rowman Altamira. ISBN 978-0-7591-1642-9. Archived from the original on 20 January 2023.
- Puligandla, Ramakrishna (1997), Fundamentals of Indian Philosophy, New Delhi: D.K. Printworld
- Radhakrishnan, S.; Moore, C.A. (1967), A Sourcebook in Indian Philosophy, Princeton University Press, ISBN 0-691-01958-4
- Raju, P.T. (1992), The Philosophical Traditions of India, Delhi: Motilal Banarsidass Publishers Private Limited
- Ratnagar, Shereen (April 2004). "Archaeology at the Heart of a Political Confrontation The Case of Ayodhya" (PDF). Current Anthropology. 45 (2): 239–259. doi:10.1086/381044. JSTOR 10.1086/381044. S2CID 149773944. Archived (PDF) from the original on 19 June 2021.
- Rinehart, R. (2004), Contemporary Hinduism: Ritual, Culture, and Practice, ABC-Clio, ISBN 1-57607-905-8
- Rodriques, Hillary; Harding, John S. (2008), Introduction to the Study of Religion, Routledge
- Samuel, Geoffrey (2010), The Origins of Yoga and Tantra. Indic Religions to the Thirteenth Century, Cambridge University Press
- Scheepers, Alfred (2000), De Wortels van het Indiase Denken, Olive Press
- Sherma, Rita D.; Sarma, Aravinda (2008), Hermeneutics and Hindu Thought: Toward a Fusion of Horizons, Springer
- Singh, S.P. (1989). "Rgvedic Base of the Pasupati Seal of Mohenjo-Daro". Purātattva. 19: 19–26.
- Smart, Ninian (2003), Godsdiensten van de wereld (The World's religions), Kampen: Uitgeverij Kok
- Srinivasan, Doris (1975). "The so-called Proto-Śiva seal from Mohenjo-Daro: An iconological assessment". Archives of Asian Art. 29: 47–58. JSTOR 20062578.
- Srinivasan, Doris Meth (1997). Many Heads, Arms and Eyes: Origin, Meaning and Form in Multiplicity in Indian Art. Brill. ISBN 978-90-04-10758-8. Archived from the original on 20 January 2023.
- Sullivan, Herbert P. (1964). "A Re-Examination of the Religion of the Indus Civilization". History of Religions. 4 (1): 115–125. doi:10.1086/462498. JSTOR 1061875. S2CID 162278147.
- Svarghese, Alexander P. (2008), India: History, Religion, Vision And Contribution To The World
- Sweetman, Will (December 2004), "The prehistory of Orientalism: Colonialism and the Textual Basis for Bartholomaus Ziegenbalg's Account of Hinduism", New Zealand Journal of Asian Studies, 6 (2): 12–38
- Thapar, Romila (1978), Ancient Indian Social History: Some Interpretations (PDF), Orient Blackswan, archived from the original (PDF) on 14 February 2015
- Thapar, Romila (2004). Early India: From the Origins to AD 1300. University of California Press. ISBN 978-0-520-24225-8. Archived from the original on 20 January 2023.
- Tiwari, K.N. (1983), Comparative Religion, Motilal Banarsidass, ISBN 978-0-89581-634-4
- Tiwari, Shiv Kumar (2002). Tribal Roots Of Hinduism. Sarup & Sons. ISBN 978-81-7625-299-7.
- von Glasenapp, Helmuth (1999). Jainism: An Indian Religion of Salvation. Delhi: Motilal Banarsidass. ISBN 81-208-1376-6.
- White, David Gordon, ed. (2000), Tantra in Practice, Princeton University Press, ISBN 0-691-05779-6
- Wright, Rita P. (2009). The Ancient Indus: Urbanism, Economy, and Society. Cambridge University Press. ISBN 978-0-521-57219-4.
- Yelle, Robert A. (December 2012), "Comparative Religion as Cultural Combat: Occidentalism and Relativism in Rajiv Malhotra's Being Different", International Journal of Hindu Studies, 16 (3): 335–348, doi:10.1007/s11407-012-9133-z, S2CID 144950049
- Zimmer, Heinrich (1951), Philosophies of India, Princeton University Press
- Zimmer, Heinrich (1953) [April 1952], Campbell, Joseph (ed.), Philosophies Of India, London: Routledge & Kegan Paul Ltd, ISBN 978-81-208-0739-6
- Zimmer, Heinrich (1969). Campbell, Joseph (ed.). Philosophies of India. Princeton University Press. ISBN 978-0-691-01758-7.
- Zimmer, Heinrich (1989), Philosophies of India (reprint ed.), Princeton University Press
