= Richard E. King =

Richard E. King is Professor of Global Philosophy at the School of Oriental and African Studies, University of London. He was previously Professor of Buddhist and Asian Studies at the University of Kent. He specialises in South Asian traditions and critical theory and Religious Studies.

== Biography ==
King obtained his first degree in Philosophy and Theology at Hull University, before completing his PhD in Religious Studies at Lancaster University in 1993. He was appointed Lecturer in Religious Studies at the University of Stirling in 1990, where he was subsequently appointed as Reader. In 2000 he moved to Derby University as Professor and Chair of the Religious Studies department. From 2005 to 2010, he moved to the USA to serve as Professor of Religious Studies at Vanderbilt University; from there he joined the Department of Theology and Religious Studies at the University of Glasgow in 2010. In December 2012, he was appointed Professor of Buddhist and Asian Studies in the University of Kent. He has served as Visiting Professor and guest lecturer at Liverpool Hope and Cambridge University. He contributed to the Guggenheim Museum's exhibition "The Third Mind" as a member of the advisory committee, and has been invited to offer public lectures by universities throughout Europe and the USA. He has served as co-chair for the Cultural History for the Study of Religion group for the American Academy of Religion.

== Works ==
- Early Advaita Vedānta and Buddhism: the Mahāyāna context of the Gauḍapādīya-kārikā. Series: SUNY Series in Religious Studies. (State University of New York Press, 1995). ISBN 9780791425138
- Orientalism and Religion : Postcolonial Theory, India and 'the Mystic East' . (Routledge, 1999). ISBN 9780415202572
- Indian Philosophy : an Introduction to Hindu and Buddhist Thought. (Edinburgh University Press, 1999). ISBN 978-0748609543
- with Carrette, Jeremy. Selling Spirituality: the Silent Takeover of Religion. (Routledge, 2005). ISBN 9780415302081
- with Hinnells, John R. (Eds.) Religion and Violence in South Asia: Theory and Practice. (Routledge, 2007). ISBN 9780415372909
