= Alf Hiltebeitel =

American Indologist (1942-2023)

Alfred John Hiltebeitel (April 10, 1942 - March 12, 2023) was Columbian Professor of Religion, History, and Human Sciences at George Washington University in Washington, D.C., US. His academic specialism was in ancient Sanskrit epics such as the Mahabharata and Ramayana, together with Indian religious tradition and folklore.

== Background ==
Hiltebeitel was awarded a B.A. degree from Haverford College, where he majored in religion and minored in English (1959-1963). He attended the University of Chicago Divinity School, where he obtained an M.A. (1966) and a Ph.D. (1973) in the history of religions. His doctoral thesis is entitled Gods, Heroes, and Krsna: A Study of the Mahabharata in relation to Indian and Indo-European Symbolisms.

Hiltebeitel was an editorial assistant for Seabury Press in New York City during 1963–1964, and between 1967-1968 he held a similar post with the History of Religions Journal. He was appointed an assistant professor in religion at George Washington University (GWU) in 1968, and was promoted to associate professor there in 1974. His appointment as professor in religion at GWU came in 1981. In the years following he delivered invitational lectures at universities such as The Sorbonne and the University of Wisconsin, as well as working on academic programs in south India.

He was editor-in-chief of Hinduism for Oxford Bibliographies Online from 2009, and editor-in-chief of the India's Sanskrit Epics: Text and Tradition series for Motilal Banarsidass publishers, as of 2015.

Among his many awards were a Guggenheim Fellowship and a Woodrow Wilson Fellowship.

== Publications ==
Hiltebeitel has written several books, and acted as editor and translator for several others, as well as contributing numerous papers to academic journals.

In addition, he was director of Lady of Gingee: South Indian Draupadi Festivals (1988), a two-part video that was filmed in the Indian state of Tamil Nadu in 1986. Initially released as two 55-minute episodes with support from several academic institutions, the video has also been released in a shortened form comprising two 34-minute parts.

=== Author ===
- The Ritual of Battle: Krishna in the Mahabharata, Cornell University Press (1976). (Reprinted Albany: State University of New York Press, 1990; Delhi: Sri Satguru Publications, 1991).
- The Cult of Draupadi: Mythologies: From Gingee to Kuruksetra, University of Chicago Press (1988). (Reprinted Delhi: Motilal Banarsidass, 1992).
- The Cult of Draupadi: On Hindu Ritual and the Goddess, University of Chicago Press (1991).
- Rethinking India's Oral and Classical Epics: Draupadi among Rajputs, Muslims, and Dalits, University of Chicago Press (1999). (Reprinted Delhi: Oxford, 2001).
- Rethinking the Mahabharata: A Reader's Guide to the Education of the Dharma King, University of Chicago Press (2001).
- Dharma ( Dimensions of Asian Spirituality, 3), University of Hawaii Press (2010)
- Dharma: Its Early History in Law, Religion, and Narrative, Oxford University Press (2011).
- Reading the Fifth Veda: Studies on the Mahabharata; Essays by Alf Hiltebeitel, volume 1, ed. by Vishwa Adluri and Joydeep Bagchee, E. J. Brill (2011).
- When the Goddess Was a Woman: Mahabharata Ethnographies; Essays by Alf Hiltebeitel, volume 2, ed. by Vishwa Adluri and Joydeep Bagchee. E. J. Brill (2011).
- Nonviolence in the Mahabharata: Sivan's Summa on Rishidharma and the Gleaners of Kurukshetra, Routledge (2016)
- Freud's Mahabharata, Oxford University Press (2018)
- Freud's India: Sigmund Freud and India's First Psychoanalyst Girindrasekhar Bose, Oxford University Press (2018)
- World of Wonders: The Work of Abdhutarasa in the Mahabharata and the Harivamsa, Oxford University Press (2021)

=== Editor ===
- Criminal Gods and Demon Devotees: Essays on the Guardians of Popular Hinduism, State University of New York Press (1989).
- Hair: Its Meaning and Power in Asian Cultures, co-edited with Barbara D. Miller, State University of New York Press (1998).
- Is the Goddess a Feminist? The Politics of South Asian Goddesses, co.-edited with Kathleen M. Erndl, New York University Press and Sheffield (2000).

== Death ==
Hiltebeitel died on March 12, 2023, in Cali, Colombia, where he lived with his wife.
