= Doris Meth Srinivasan =

German indologist (born c. 1960)

Doris Srinivasan
- Born: c. 1960 (age c. 65); Schwabisch Gmund, Baden-Wurttemberg, West Germany
- Education: University of Pennsylvania (PhD)

Doris Meth Srinivasan (born c. 1960) is a German indologist. She is a professor of Indological studies. She has authored more than 75 publications. She was curator of South and South East Asian arts at Nelson-Atkins Museum in Kansas City, Missouri.

== Early life ==
Doris Meth Srinivasan was born in Schwabisch Gmund, West Germany. She received her BA (with honors) from Hunter College, CUNY and earned a PhD from University of Pennsylvania. Her dissertation was "Concept of Cow in Rigveda". She taught mainly South Asian Art and Religion at various universities including Columbia University, Barnard College, George Washington University, and George Mason University.

== Publications ==
- Many Heads, Arms and eyes: Origin, Meaning and Forms of Multiplicity in Indian Art (1997)
- Mathura : The Cultural Heritage (1989)
- Vishnu (2000)
- Urban form and meaning in South Asia (1993)
- On the Cusp of an Era (with Srinivasan)(2007)
