= San Román de Basa =

San Román de Basa Sant Román de Basa
- Interactive map of San Román de Basa
- Country: Spain
- Province: Huesca
- Municipality: Sabiñánigo
- Elevation: 970 m (3,180 ft)

Population (2014)
  - Total: 5

San Román de Basa (Aragonese: Sant Román de Basa) is a village in Spain under the local government of the municipality of Sabiñánigo, in the province of Huesca, and in the region of Aragon, Spain.

== Geography ==
=== Landscape of area ===
77% of the area is forest, 1% is water. The mean height is 1,097 metres (3,599 ft). The lowest point in the village is 662 metres (2,172 ft) while the highest is 2,711 metres (8,894 ft).

Two rivers flow through the village: the Río Aurín and the Río Basa.

=== Neighbouring places ===
The village is located 1.2 kilometres (0.75 miles) south of Isún de Basa, another nearby village. To the west, at a distance of 1.7 kilometres (1.1 miles), lies the locality of Osán, while Sardas is situated 3.2 kilometres (2.0 miles) to the west. To the southwest, 2.3 kilometres (1.4 miles) from San Román de Basa, is the municipality of Allué, and to the southeast, 2.4 kilometres (1.5 miles) away, is the municipality of Yebra de Basa.
