= Cartirana =

- municipality
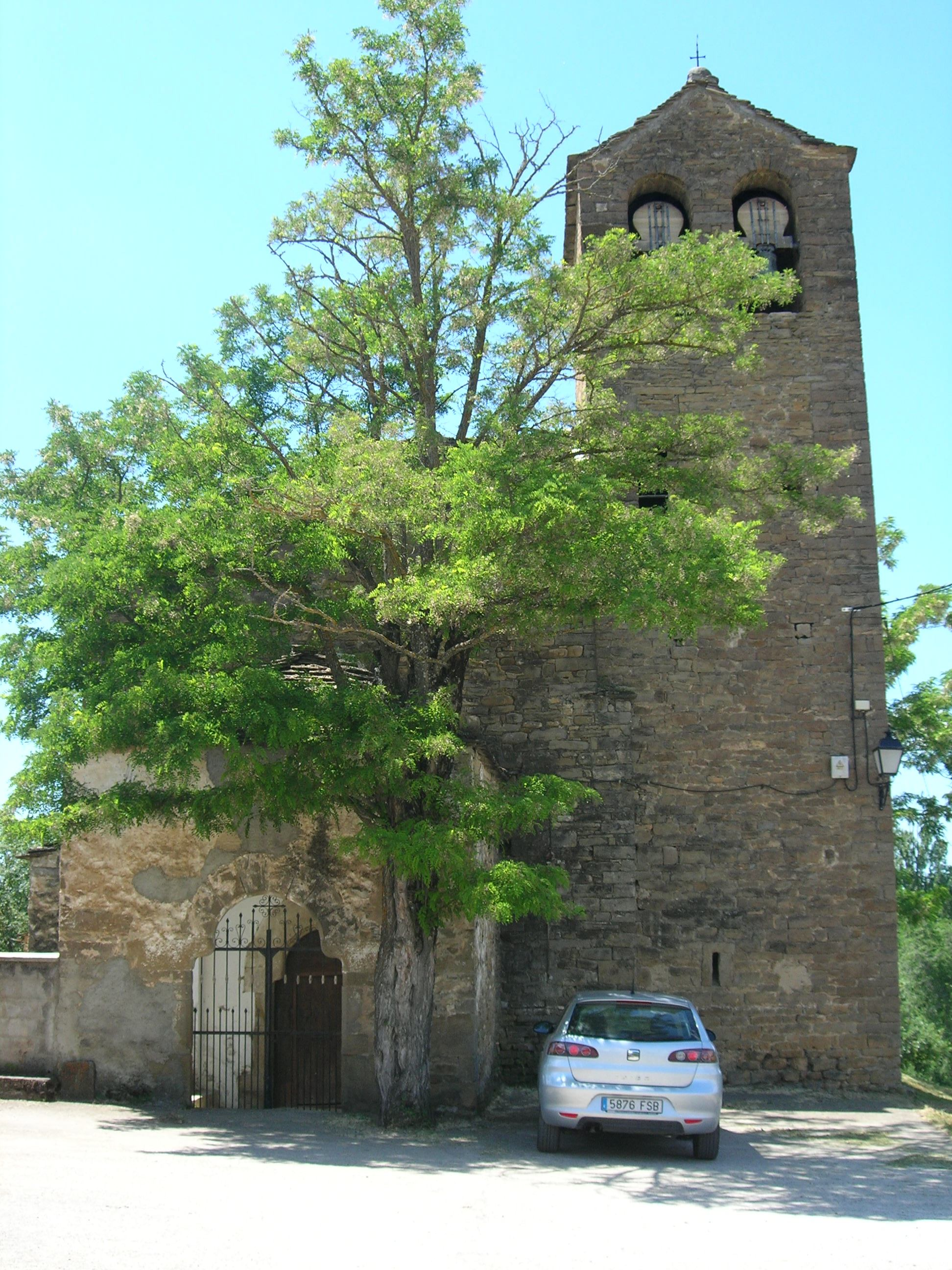
- San Martin Church in Cartirana

- Location within Spain
- Coordinates: 42°31′N 0°22′W
- Country: Spain
- Autonomous community: Aragon
- Province: Huesca
- Municipality: Sabiñánigo
- Elevation: 857 m (2,812 ft)

Population (2008)
  - Total: 53
- Time zone: UTC+1 (CET)
  - Summer (DST): UTC+2 (CEST)

Cartirana is a municipality located in Aragon, Huesca, Spain. It is approximately 15 km northwest of Jaca.

== Location ==
Cartirana is located 2 kilometers from Sabiñago (northwestern direction) in a plateau, similar to others in this area, at an altitude of 857 meters.

== History ==
This place was first mentioned in 1100 in the will of a man named April that said he owned several houses and a palace in the place. In the 12th century, other properties seemed to be in possession of Fanlo and Montearagón monasteries.

Late XV siegle, there were 8 houses in the place. This amount was reduced to 5 and 30 inhabitants in mid-19th century. In 1981, 51 persons were registered in populational roll.

At the beginning, Cartirana was a suburb of next city of Jaca, until it created its own municipality in 1834. In 1845, Aurín and Borres linked their management to Cartirana, and from 1930 and 1949, Larres did similar. Nowadays, all these places are integrated in Sabiñanigo municipality.

== Demography ==
Changes in municipalities from 1842:From 1857 to before one data, Cartirana municipality included 225028 (Aurín) y 225060 (Borrés).From 1940 to before one data, Cartirana municipality included a 22585 (Larrés).From 1960 to before one data, one part of municipality was transferred to 22199 (Sabiñánigo).From 1970 to before one data, all municipality was integrated in 22199 (Sabiñánigo)
Datos	1842	1857	1860	1877	1887	1897	1900	1910	1920	1930	1940	1950	1960	1970	1981	1991	2001
Real population	..	266	263	262	277	255	277	248	277	342	474	516	308	..	..	..	..
Registered population	74	..	..	262	284	241	269	264	256	334	487	493	311	..	..	..	..
Houses	12	39	39	60	73	63	68	66	64	53	76	128	66	..	..	..	..

Demography from 2000
2000	2001	2002	2003	2004	2005	2006	2007	2008
42	42	45	41	44	49	49	50	53

== Popular architecture ==
Its streets are an irregular layout and the town is renewed, while few examples that still show the old folk architecture."Casa Ubieto", "Casa Pablo" and "Casa Latas" stand out in the urban. On the other hand, "casa Escolano" shows the best features of vernacular architecture as the "serrablesa" chimney, framed windows and the typical oven.

Other items to note are the parish church of San Martín, the Hermitage in St. Lucia and the entire laundry and supplies.

== San Martín parish church ==
The old church belonged to archpriesthood of Ahornes. The parish is mentioned among the archdeaconry of Camara and was dedicated to San Martín, with its image as the only existing in altar in 1499. At that time were kept in the church chalices of silver and nine liturgical codices. Today, church, modern-looking inside, stands on the outside of the tower, slim, reminiscent in appearance to those of Gállego. Back inside, access to the choir and the current northern foot of the wall, we find ourselves with a gateway arch, with projecting imposts bevel, forming a horseshoe arch false style of Gállego mozarabe.

== Santa Lucía chapel ==
A chapel was built in 1701 in honour of Santa Lucía. It was renewed in 1981, when it was in ruins.

== Water springs and supply ==
Town is water supplied from tanks in next Santa Lucia hill (they also supply to Sabiñanigo, municipality head). Although, from old age, town was supplied by water springs located behind the church, in a hollow of surrounding terrain. Washing place and water springs were recently renewed.

Water from spring is stored in a small reservoir for its use in close green gardens.

A new water spring was discovered in the early 1990s and was acondicionated in a new fountain called "La fontañona", which is situated just down the dam.

== Festivities ==
Main festivities are in honor of San Martín (11 November) and minor ones are in honor of Santa Lucia (13 December).

== Bibliography ==
- Aragón pueblo a pueblo, 4; ZAPATER, ALFONSO. Mainer Til Editores, S.L. ISBN 84-89122-03-2.
