= Isín =

- Population unit
- Coordinates: 42°35′57″N 0°24′16″W
- Country: Spain
- Autonomous community: Aragon
- Province: Huesca
- Municipality: Sabiñánigo
- Elevation: 1,027 m (3,369 ft)

Population (2019)
  - Total: 5

Isín (Spanish pronunciation: [is'in]) is a locality belonging to the municipality of Sabiñánigo (Alto Gállego, Huesca, Aragon, Spain). In 2019, it had a population of 5 inhabitants. The populated place lies in the valley formed by the Aurín river, on its right bank, at about 1027 metres above sea level.

A standalone municipality in the 1842 census, it was annexed by Acumuer before the 1857 census.
