= Sabiñánigo =

Sabiñánigo Samianigo (Aragonese)
- Municipality
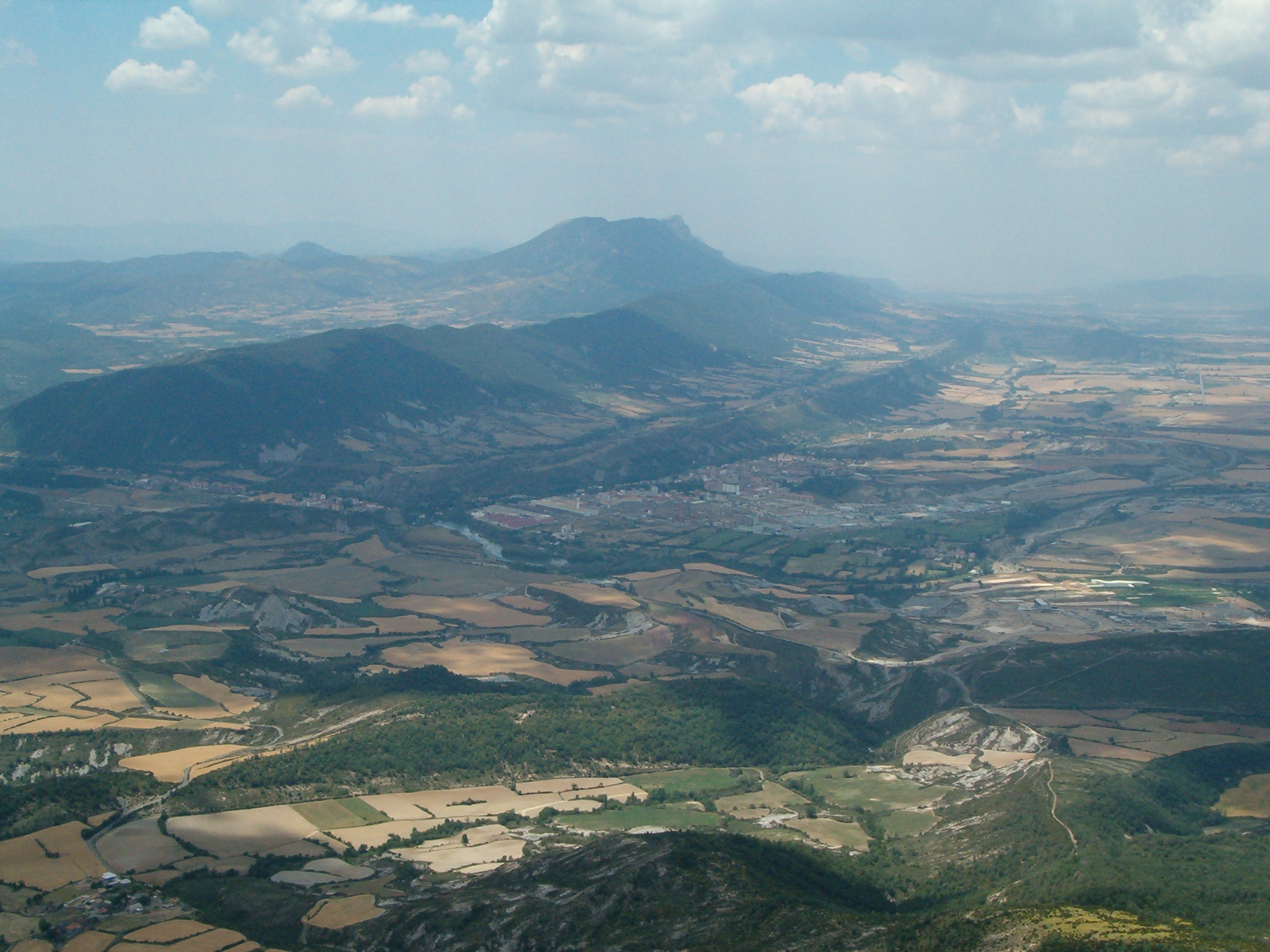
- View of Sabiñánigo from Mount Santa Orosia

- Flag Coat of arms

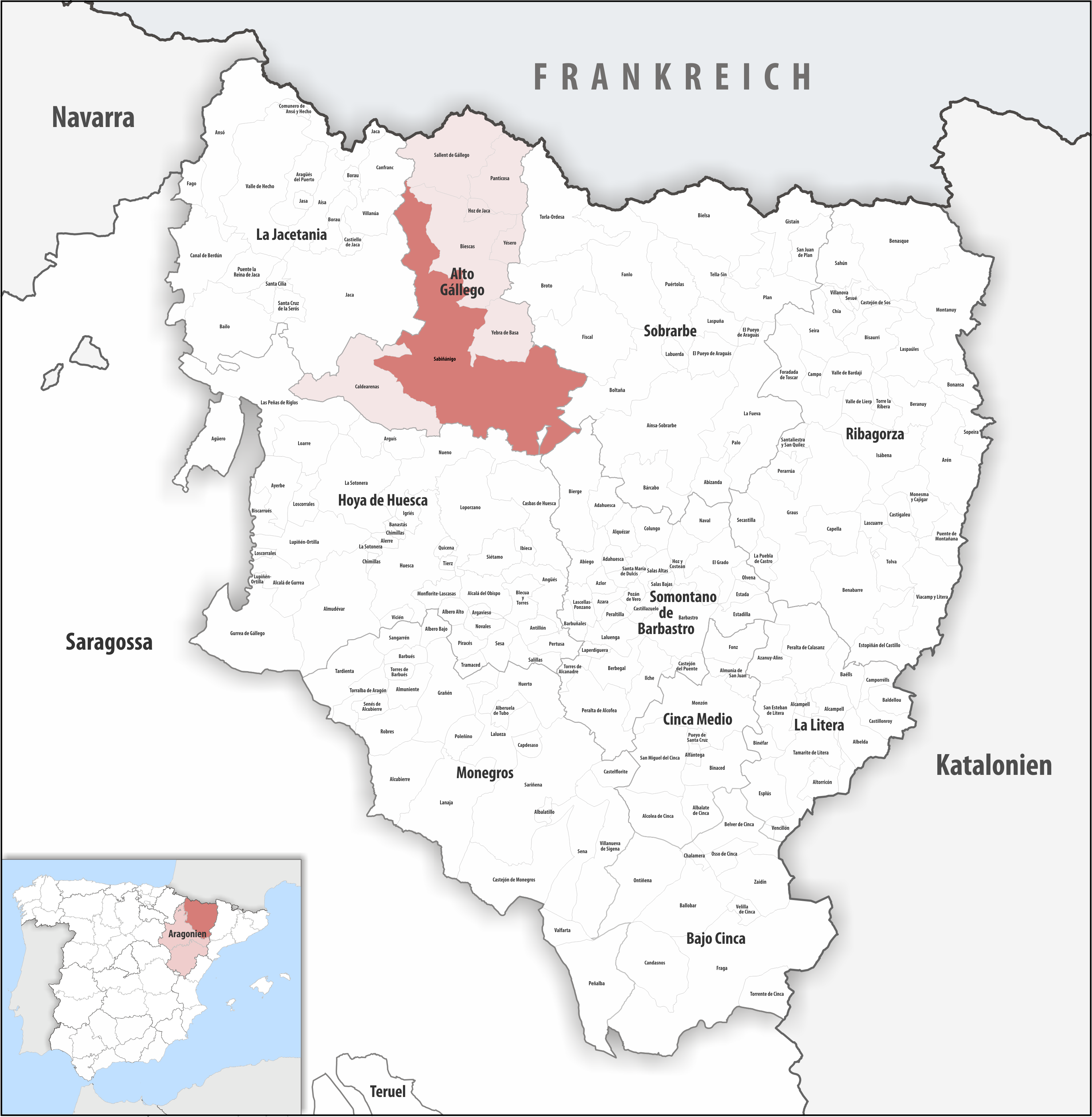
- Municipal location within the Comarca of Alto Gállego and Province of Huesca.

- Location within Spain
- Coordinates: 42°31′6.9″N 0°21′52″E
- Country: Spain
- Autonomous community: Aragon
- Province: Huesca
- Comarca: Alto Gállego

Area
  - Total: 586.82 km^{2} (226.57 sq mi)
- Elevation: 780 m (2,560 ft)

Population (2025-01-01)
  - Total: 9,695
  - Density: 16.52/km^{2} (42.79/sq mi)
- Time zone: UTC+1 (CET)
  - Summer (DST): UTC+2 (CEST)

Sabiñánigo (Samianigo in Aragonese) is a municipality located in the province of Huesca, Aragón, Spain, capital of the comarca of Alto Gállego. Formerly, the region was called Serrablo, hence the demonym "serrablese". Sabiñánigo is at an altitude of 780 m and lies 52 km from Huesca.

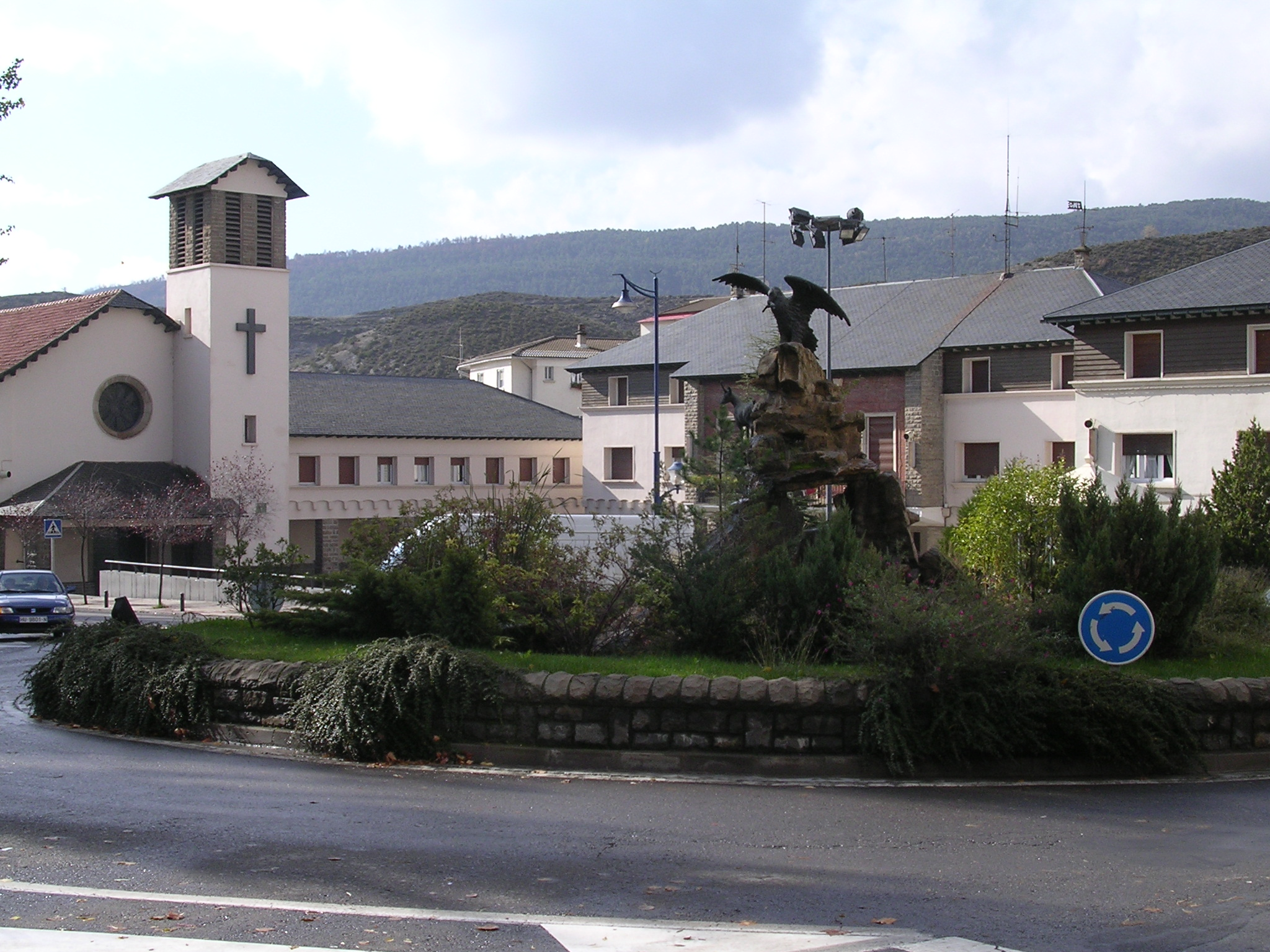
Main Square, Town Hall and Church

It borders to the north the municipalities of Biescas and Yebra de Basa; to the east Fiscal and Boltaña; to the south on Las Peñas de Riglos; to the south-east the Somontano de Barbastro and to the west the municipalities of Caldearenas, Jaca and Villanúa.

== Toponymy ==
His first reliable testimony is from 1035 (there is another from the year 992, but it is found in a forged document). It appears as Savignaneco (/sabijnáneko/). It will reappear in documentation from the twelfth and thirteenth centuries. Its etymology will be the Latin name Sabinianicu, derived in turn from Sabinianus and this from Sabinius or Sabinus. In modern Aragonese, the name has evolved into Samianigo.

== Geography ==
Integrated in the region of Alto Gállego, of which it serves as the capital, it is located 52 kilometres from the provincial capital. The municipality is crossed by the national roads N-260, the Pyrenees road axis, and the N-330, between km 604 and 633. It also has a network of local roads that connect the districts and the neighboring municipalities of Jaca and Caldearenas. Finally, the A-1604 regional road runs through the Serrablo Valley towards Boltaña.

The relief of the municipality is defined by Pyrenean valleys (Acumuer or Aurín Valley to the northwest, Gállego Valley from north to south, Basa Valley to the east and Serrablo or Guarga Valley to the south), by the Pyrenees to the north and by the pre-Pyrenean mountains of San Pedro (1212 m), south of the town; Belarre (1467 m), Guara (1679 m) and Aineto (1463 m) to the south of the Serrablo valley; and Portiello (1545 m), Canciás (1929 m) and Galardón (1803 m) to the north of the Serrablo Valley. Also famous are the Val Ancha and the Val Estrecho, between the Aurín River and the Sierra de San Pedro. Part of its municipal area is occupied by the Sierra Guara and Canyons of Guara Natural Park. The altitude ranges from 2764 metres north (Peña Retona), in the Pyrenees, to 665 metres on the banks of the Gállego River.

The village is located on the right bank of the Gállego at its exit from the Tena Valley, at an altitude of 780 meters above sea level.

Northwest: Canfranc and Villanúa	North: Sallent de Gállego y Biescas	Northeast: Biescas and Yebra de Basa
West: Jaca	Compass_rose_en_08p	East: Fiscal and Boltaña
Southwest: Caldearenas	South: Nueno	Southeast: Bierge

Previously, the region in which Sabiñánigo was framed was known as Serrablo, so the inhabitants of this town are also known as serrableses.

== History ==
=== Ancient and Middle Ages ===
The origin of Sabiñánigo is Roman Empire and seems to be linked to the establishment of a military mansion, founded around the second century, on the banks of the road that connected Osca (present-day Huesca) with the thermal baths of Panticosa. In 1972 the two-thousandth anniversary of the founding of the city was celebrated, considering that Calvisio Sabino —propraetor of Gaul— founded Sabiniano at the conclusion of a pacification campaign in Hispania.

The first documented historical mention of Sabiñánigo is from 1035 where it appears as Savignaneco, and refers to its incorporation into the Kingdom of Aragon. Around 1137, in the middle of the medieval period, its status as a royal town is already mentioned, a category that it would maintain centuries later. Since that time the enclave enjoyed privileges, not being subjugated to any rural lord until the Modern era, when it lost this advantageous condition.

Pedro II, in 1206, donated his church of San Acisclo to García de Gúdal, bishop of Jaca-Huesca. And at the end of the Middle Ages (1492), Ferdinand the Catholic intervened to set the limits of its terms and solve the problems posed by the vacant knighthoods of honor in this place.

=== Modern and Contemporary ages ===
During the sixteenth century, the tax on horses continued to be paid and a certain economic take-off began. In 1594, an agreement was signed with the cattle ranchers of the Tena valley regarding the passage of transhumant cattle through the boundaries of the town of Sabiñánigo and those of its dependent villages. However, judging by the documents, the place seems to have been ruined in 1696.

Pascual Madoz, in his 1845 Geographical-Statistical-Historical Dictionary of Spain, describes Sabiñánigo as a small town of 28 houses, although with a town hall and prison; It also indicates that he subsisted by his agriculture and livestock, producing his lands "pure and mixed wheat, legumes, potatoes and pastures".

At the end of the 19th century, the construction of the railway that would link Zaragoza with France through Canfranc began. With the arrival of the railroad in 1893, a train station was built near Sabiñánigo town; A new nucleus of activity began to grow around this station, opening shops and lodgings around the road that would soon be called Paseo de la Estación. The new Sabiñánigo became an obligatory place of passage to the spa of Panticosa, where people came in order to drink the beneficial thermal waters; After about five hours on the train between Zaragoza and Sabiñánigo, they took carriages – buses from 1909 onwards – that took them to the aforementioned seaside resort.

The Barrio de la Estación began to have a greater prominence than the original urban centre, and was consolidating thanks, first to shops, and then to the establishment of factories. So much so, that in 1916 the City Council itself moved to the Barrio de la Estación.

The factories gave the final boost to the emerging city. In 1920, the Franco-Spanish company Energía e Industrias Aragonesas (EIASA) established a modern chemical factory that would mark a milestone by achieving the synthesis of ammonia from hydrogen for the first time in the world. Soon, AESA would be installed, in charge of the manufacture of laminated aluminium, being the first Spanish company to produce it.

In the 1950s Sabiñánigo incorporated the municipality of Sardas and part of Cartirana. In the following decade it absorbed Acumuer, Cartirana, Gésera, Jabarrella, Orna de Gállego and Senegüé and Sorripas, and parts of Ena, Gausa, and Oliván. In the 1970s it incorporated part of Laguarta.

During the Civil War, between September and November 1937, the Battle of Sabiñánigo took place in the area, in which the 43rd and 27th divisions of the Army of the Republic launched an offensive against the I Brigade of the 51st National Division and volunteers such as the Panthers of the Tena Valley and the Skiing Company.

In the end, the Republican army did not manage to conquer Sabiñánigo, an important manufacturing centre at the time, despite having been on the verge of encircling it. The battle resulted in a total number of casualties of approximately 6000 troops.

== Municipality villages ==
Nowadays, what is known as the municipality of Sabiñánigo contains the following villages:

Abellada, Abenilla, Acumuer, Aineto, Alavés, Allué, Arguisal, Arraso, Arruaba, Arto, Artosilla, Aspés, Asqués, Asún, Atós Alto, Atós Bajo, Aurín, Bara, Baranguá, Belarra, Bentué de Nocito, Bolás, Borrés, Campares, Cañardo, Cartirana, Castiello de Guarga, Castillo de Lerés, Ceresola, Fablo, Fenillosa, Gésera, Gillué, Grasa, Hostal de Ipiés, Ibirque, Ibort, Ipiés, Isín, Isún de Basa, Jabarrella, Laguarta, Lanave, Lárrede, Larrés, Lasaosa, Lasieso, Latas, Latrás, Layés, Molino de Escartín, Molino de Villobas, Ordovés, Orna de Gállego, Osán, Pardinilla, El Puente de Sabiñánigo, Rapún, Sabiñánigo Alto, San Esteban de Guarga, San Román de Basa, Sandiás, Santa María de Perula, Sardas, Sasal, Satué, Secorún, Senegüé, Solanilla, Sorripas, Used, Villacampa and Yéspola.

According to the 2004 census (INE), all of them together had a population of 977.

== Demography ==
It has a population of 9,423 inhabitants (INE 2023).

Demographic Evolution
1991	1996	2001	2003	2007	2008	2011	2021	2023
9,056	8,759	8,578	8,797	9,673	10,112	10,164	9,360	9,423

Sabiñánigo in 1900 was only 280 inhabitants, the installation of industries generated new jobs that were filled with immigrants: in 1940 it reached 1,768 inhabitants and in 1960 6,184 inhabitants. However, in the 2000s the industrial splendor of the town had been lost, with some of the plants closed and their workforce greatly reduced in other cases, although companies with a good number of employees and a significant volume of business still survive. The age pyramid, thanks to the immigration of young people, is one of the youngest in Aragon.

== Sports, Culture and Tourism ==
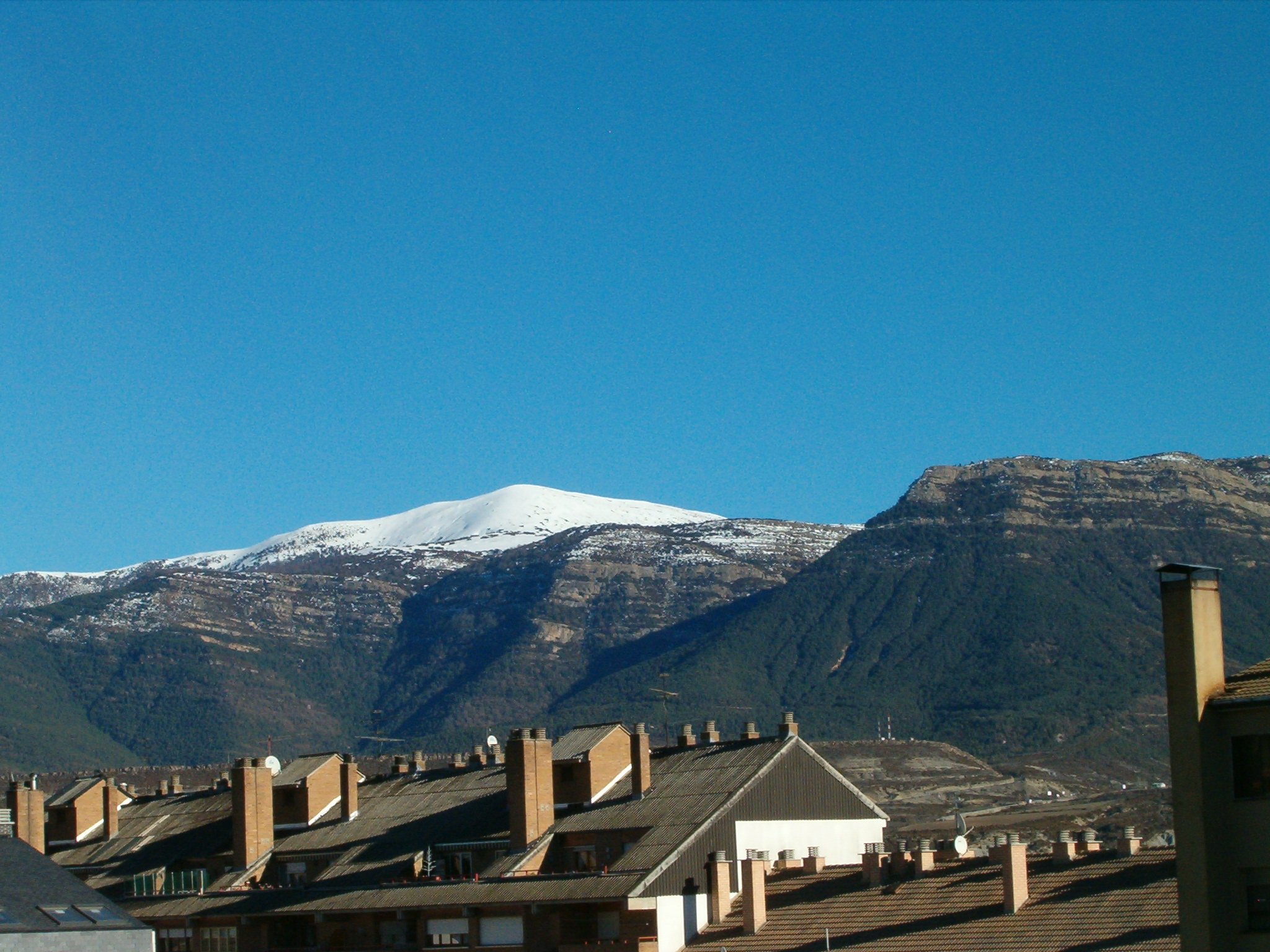
View of Mount Oturia from Sabiñánigo

Sabiñánigo has always been strongly linked to sport and, especially, to cycling. It is famous for holding "The Quebrantahuesos" ^{es}, one of the most important amateur cyclist races in the world. It is also a frequent start and finish point of the Vuelta a España.

Sabiñánigo is a great place to go skiing. It is 30 km from the Ski resort of Panticosa, 38 km from Formigal (the largest ski resort in Spain), 44 km from Candanchú, 47 km from Astún and 120 km from Cerler.

Some interesting places to visit are the Museo de Artes de Serrablo ^{es}, a museum that contains tools, clothes and all kinds of traditional objects of the region; and Pirenarium ^{es}, a theme park with a great collection of models of the Pyrenees range and the most famous buildings of Aragón.

The football team is AD Sabiñánigo.

== Twin Cities ==
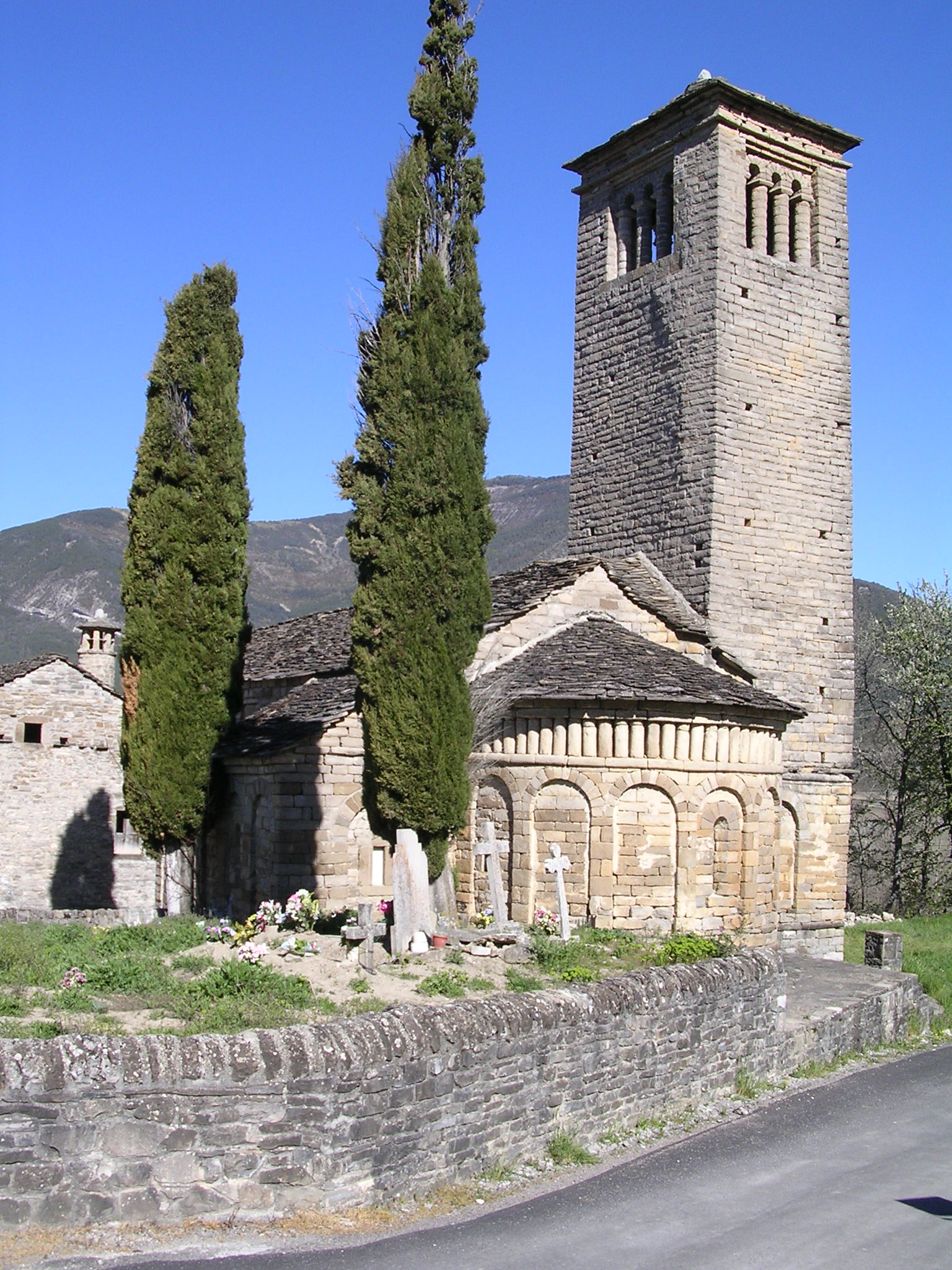
Romanesque church of San Pedro de Lárrede, in Lárrede, Sabiñánigo

Town	State/Region	Country
Billère	Occitania	France
Petersberg	Hesse	Germany
Breitungen	Thuringia	Germany
Cisek	Opole Voivodeship	Poland

== See also ==
- List of municipalities in Huesca
