= Lasaosa =

Coordinates: 42.3791°N 0.2599°W

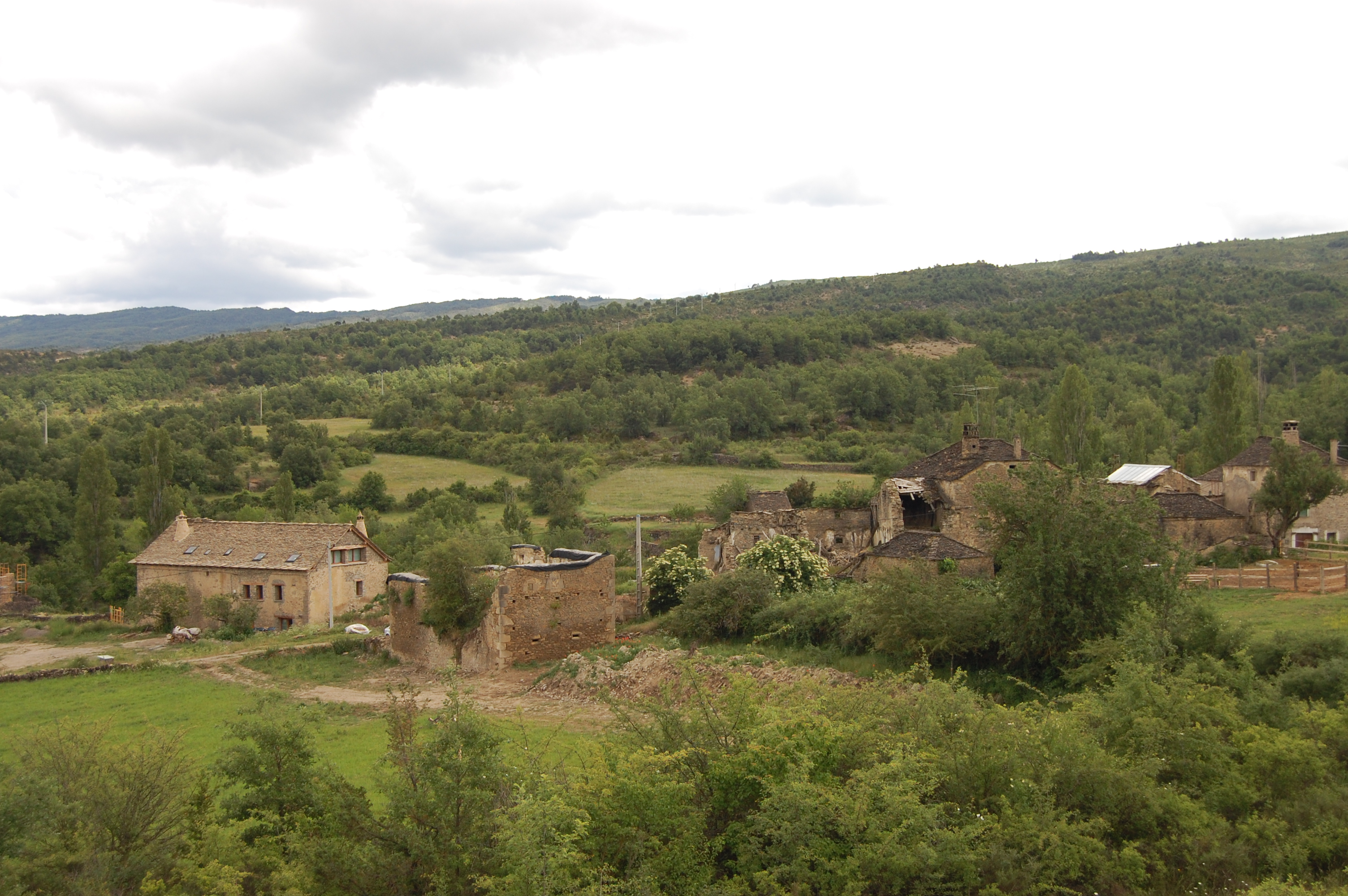
- Interactive map of Lasaosa
- Country: Spain
- Province: Huesca
- Municipality: Sabiñánigo
- Elevation: 855 m (2,805 ft)

Population (2020)
  - Total: 1

Lasaosa is a village under the local government of the municipality of Sabiñánigo, Alto Gállego, Huesca, Aragon, Spain.

It is located in Valley of the Guarguera.

It is currently in the process of reconstruction, in October 2007 the feast of the Virgen del Rosario was celebrated for the first time in the last thirty-five years. In the process of repopulation, houses are being rebuilt and attempts are being made to regenerate the infrastructures.

Account with a church in ruins and an old abbey, also demolished that dates from century XVI. Some unique buildings are maintained, such as the old blacksmith's or the bread oven.

It was abandoned around the 1960s and 1970s, ceasing to be cultivated by the inhabitants in 1976. It has always maintained, however, a human presence on the part of its former inhabitants.

In the vicinity there is the Lasaosa Dolmen, also known as booth bruxas or the house of witches. Tomb of considerable dimensions (2 * 1,5m and 1,7m high) in which several bodies and some utensils were found. Discovered in 1949 and excavated in 1953, it is older than 4,000 BC. being a clear Neolithic monument altoaragonés.
