= Belarra =

Coordinates: 42.3763°N 0.3630°W

- Interactive map of Belarra
- Country: Spain
- Province: Huesca
- Municipality: Sabiñánigo
- Elevation: 840 m (2,760 ft)

Population (2013)
  - Total: 7

Belarra is a village under the local government of the municipality of Sabiñánigo, Alto Gállego, Huesca, Aragon, Spain.
