= Castiello =

Castiello may refer to:

== People ==
- Francesco Castiello (1942–2024), Italian politician

== Places ==
- Castiello Bernueces, a parish of the municipality of Gijón / Xixón, in Asturias, Spain
- Castiello de Guarga, a locality in the municipality of Sabiñánigo, in Huesca province, Aragon, Spain
- Castiello de Jaca, a municipality in the province of Huesca, Aragon, Spain
