= Arto, Spain =

Coordinates: 42.4506°N 0.4136°W

Arto
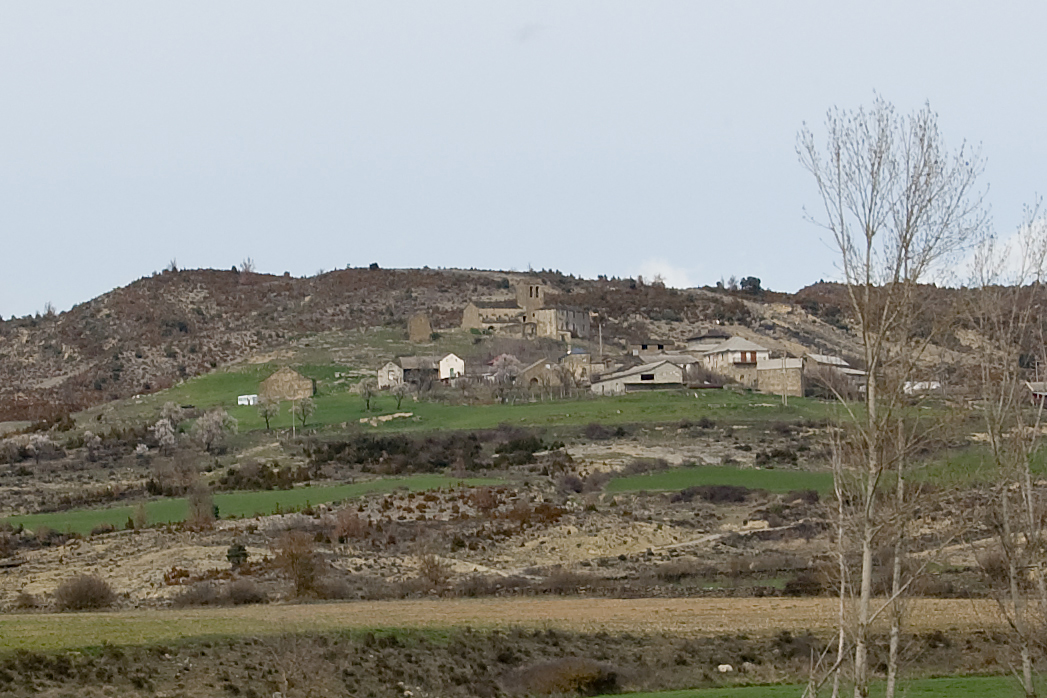
- Interactive map of Arto
- Country: Spain
- Province: Huesca
- Municipality: Sabiñánigo
- Elevation: 800 m (2,600 ft)

Population (2011)
  - Total: 18

Arto is a village under the local government of the municipality of Sabiñánigo, Alto Gállego, Huesca, Aragon, Spain.
