= Artosilla =

Coordinates: 42.4258°N 0.2622°W

Artosilla Artosiella
- Interactive map of Artosilla
- Country: Spain
- Province: Huesca
- Municipality: Sabiñánigo
- Elevation: 990 m (3,250 ft)

Population (2014)
  - Total: 13

Artosilla (Aragonese: Artosiella) is a village under the local government of the municipality of Sabiñánigo, Alto Gállego, Huesca, Aragon, Spain.

== History ==
It was abandoned in the 1960s. In 1986, it was given to the "Artiborain Association" (acronym of the places of ARTosiella, IBOR and AINEto), which since then has rebuilt and repopulated it.
