= Arraso =

Coordinates: 42.3853°N 0.3211°W

- Interactive map of Arraso
- Country: Spain
- Province: Huesca
- Municipality: Sabiñánigo
- Elevation: 951 m (3,120 ft)

Population (2014)
  - Total: 7

Arraso is a village under the local government of the municipality of Sabiñánigo, Alto Gállego, Huesca, Aragon, Spain.

== Geography ==
Arraso located in the valley of the Guarga River. Es una pequeña villa formada por la familia Zamora

== History ==
Together with Yéspola, it was part of the historic municipality of Arraso and Éspola.
