= Yéspola =

Coordinates: 42°22′N 0°20′W

Yéspola Yespola
- Interactive map of Yéspola
- Country: Spain
- Province: Huesca
- Municipality: Sabiñánigo
- Elevation: 885 m (2,904 ft)

Population (2024)
  - Total: 8

Yéspola (Aragonese: Yespola) is a village under the local government of the municipality of Sabiñánigo, Alto Gállego, Huesca, Aragon, Spain.

It is situated in the Pyrenees foothills at an altitude of 938 meters above sea level. According to the 2023 municipal register published by Spain's National Statistics Institute (INE), Yéspola has a population of 8 inhabitants.

The village is located approximately 6 kilometers northeast of the municipal capital, Sabiñánigo.
