= Bentué de Nocito =

Coordinates: 42.3253°N 0.2161°W

- Interactive map of Bentué de Nocito
- Country: Spain
- Province: Huesca
- Municipality: Sabiñánigo
- Elevation: 840 m (2,760 ft)

Population (2014)
  - Total: 1

Bentué de Nocito is a village under the local government of the municipality of Sabiñánigo, Alto Gállego, Huesca, Aragon, Spain.
