= Aineto =

Coordinates: 42.3921°N 0.1928°W

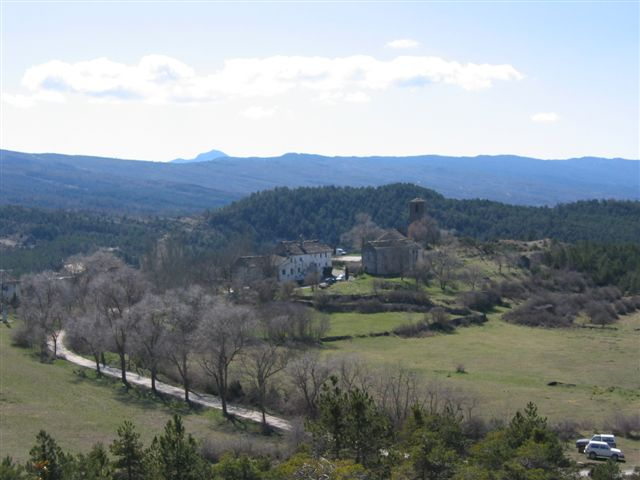
- Interactive map of Aineto
- Country: Spain
- Province: Huesca
- Municipality: Sabiñánigo
- Elevation: 998 m (3,274 ft)

Population (2014)
  - Total: 42

Aineto is a village under the local government of the municipality of Sabiñánigo, Alto Gállego, Huesca, Aragon, Spain.

Aineto was initially cited in 1076, and its name has had variations such as Agineto and Ayneto. It has always been a property of the Crown, meaning it belonged to the King. Ecclesiastically, it was initially under the Bishopric of Huesca and, from 1571 onward, under that of Jaca. Its parish church is dedicated to the Archangel Saint Michael. The population remained around five residents until 1790, increasing to sixteen in 1797, its highest recorded number. Established as a municipality in 1834, it later joined with Secorún in 1845, eventually becoming part of Sabiñánigo in 1970. The locals of Aineto are referred to as "Señoritos."

In terms of architecture, Aineto exhibits notable examples of popular architecture, featuring beautiful doorways adorned with reliefs and voussoirs, along with typical truncated cone chimneys.
