= Lasieso =

Coordinates: 42°25′N 0°26′W

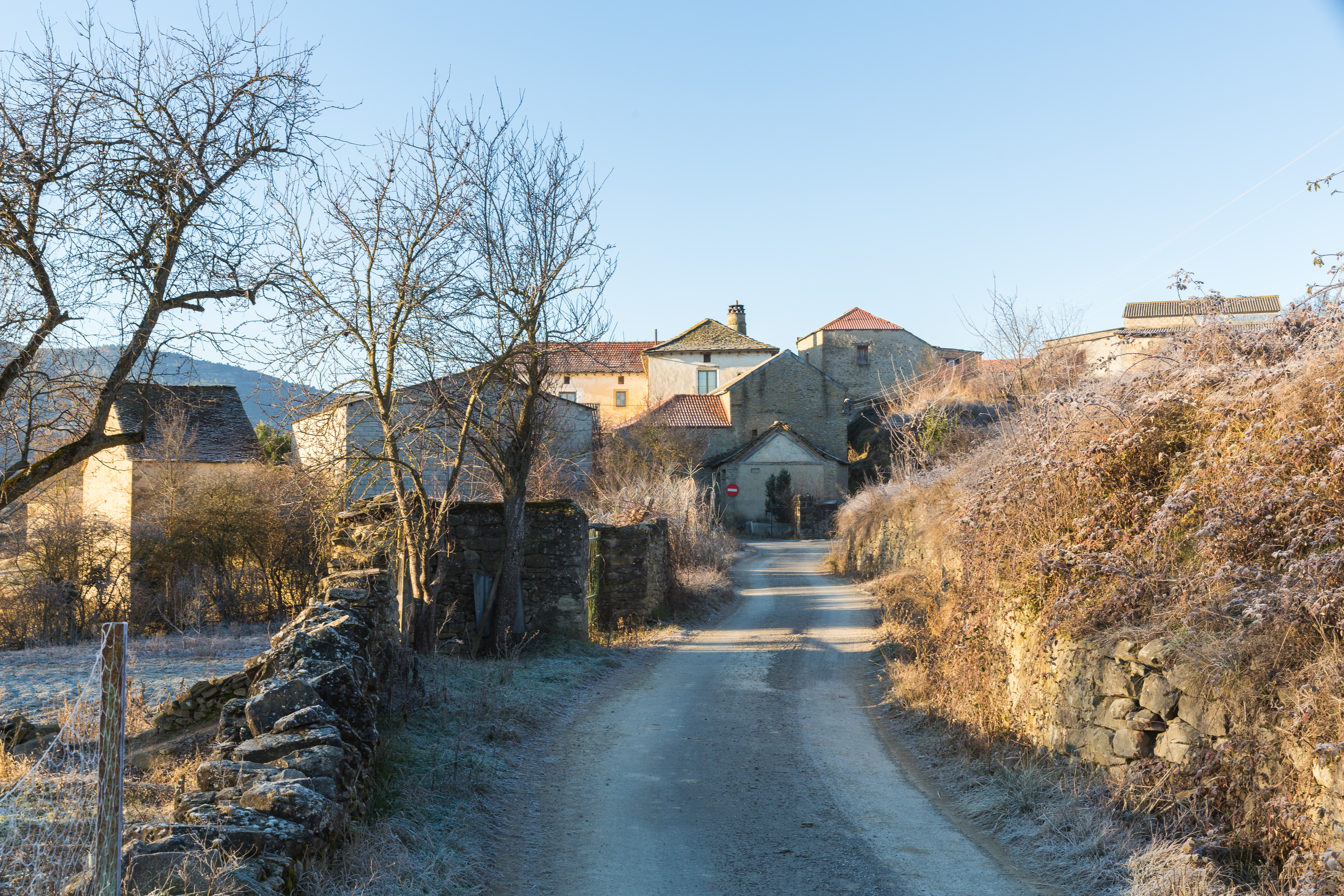
- Interactive map of Lasieso
- Country: Spain
- Province: Huesca
- Municipality: Sabiñánigo
- Elevation: 721 m (2,365 ft)

Population (2014)
  - Total: 10

Lasieso is a village under the local government of the municipality of Sabiñánigo, Alto Gállego, Huesca, Aragon, Spain.
