= Rodri Val =

Spanish footballer

Personal information
- Full name: Rodrigo Val Puertolas
- Date of birth: 5 January 2001 (age 25)
- Place of birth: Aurín, Spain
- Height: 1.78 m (5 ft 10 in)
- Position: Winger

Team information
- Current team: Mirandés

Youth career
- Zaragoza
- 2019–2020: Levante

Senior career*
Years	Team	Apps	(Gls)
2019	Zaragoza B	2	(0)
2020–2023	Levante B	16	(0)
2020–2021	→ Tarazona (loan)	25	(2)
2023	Brea	14	(1)
2023–2024	Huesca B	30	(3)
2024–2025	Ejea	33	(6)
2025–2026	Sanluqueño	36	(4)
2026	Eldense	2	(0)
2026–	Mirandés	0	(0)
- * Club domestic league appearances and goals as of 22 August 2026

Rodrigo "Rodri" Val Puertolas (born 5 January 2001) is a Spanish professional footballer who plays mainly as a right winger for CD Mirandés.

== Career ==
Born in Aurín, Huesca, Aragon, Val is a youth product of Real Zaragoza, and made his senior debut with the reserves on 6 January 2019, starting in a 0–0 Tercera División home draw against SD Tarazona. On 18 July, he moved to Levante UD, being initially a member of their Juvenil squad.

On 23 September 2020, after finishing his formation, Val was loaned to Segunda División B side Tarazona, for one year. Back to the Granotes in July 2021, he was assigned to the reserves in Segunda División RFEF, and despite being rarely used, he still renewed his contract on 1 March 2022.

In January 2023, Val moved to CD Brea also in the fourth division, but left the club in June after helping them narrowly avoid relegation. On 4 September, he moved to another reserve team, SD Huesca B in Tercera Federación.

In July 2024, Val agreed to a deal with SD Ejea in division four, being a regular starter before moving to Primera Federación side Atlético Sanluqueño CF on 11 June 2025. On 3 July 2026, despite suffering relegation, he signed a one-year contract with CD Eldense, newly-promoted to Segunda División.

Val made his professional debut on 17 August 2026, coming on as a second-half substitute for Pau Cabanes in a 3–0 away loss to UD Almería. On 1 September, however, after just one further match, he moved back to the third division with CD Mirandés.
