= Used, Huesca =

Used
- Village
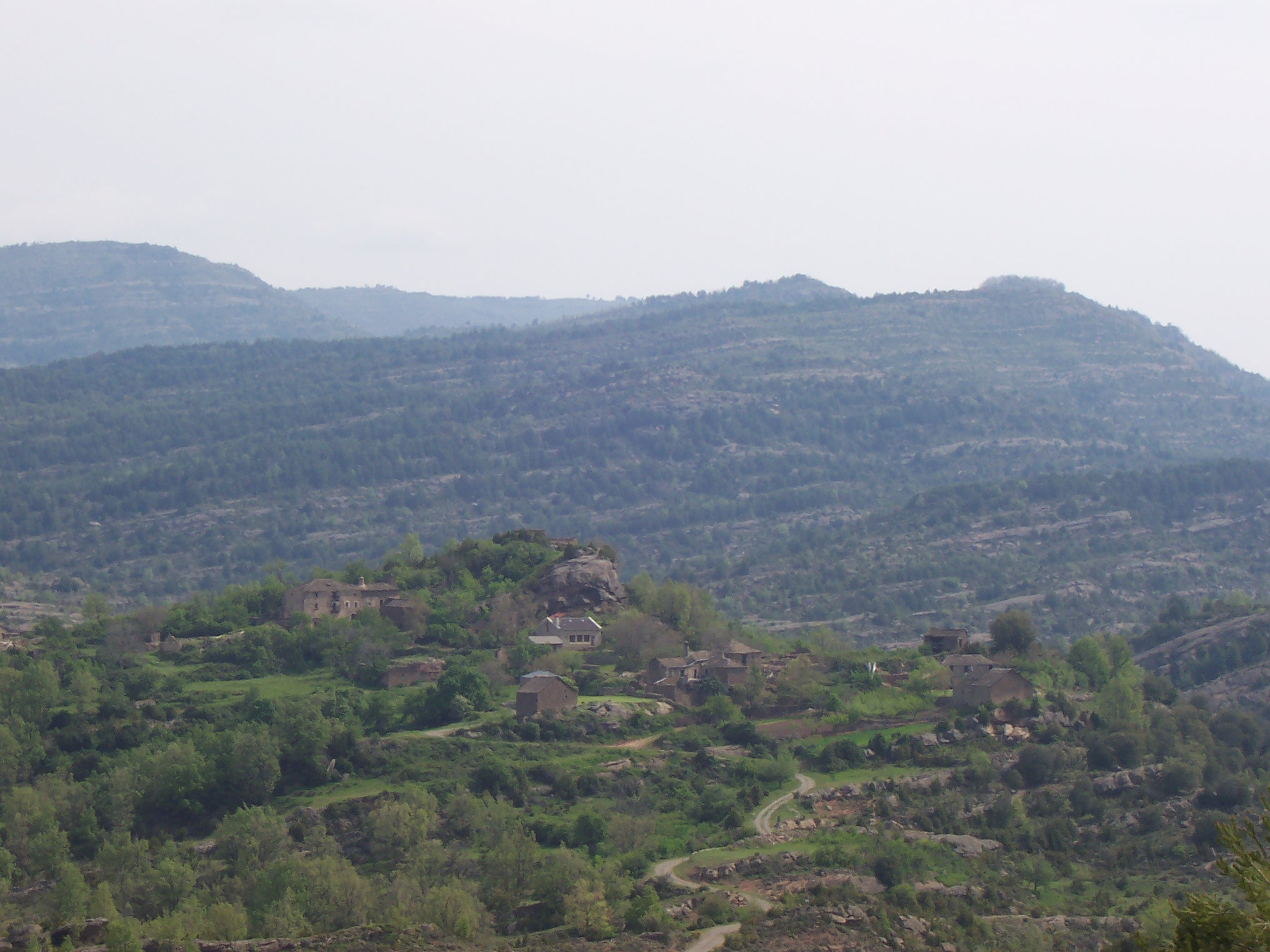
- Village of Used
- Interactive map of Used
- Coordinates: 42°19′25″N 0°11′31″W
- Country: Spain
- Autonomous Community: Aragon
- Province: Huesca
- Comarca: Alto Gállego
- Municipio: Sabiñánigo

Area
  - Total: 10.8 km^{2} (4.2 sq mi)
- Elevation: 1,150 m (3,770 ft)

Population (2017)
  - Total: 0
- Time zone: UTC+1 (CET)
  - Summer (DST): UTC+2 (CEST)
- Postal code: 22622
- Area code: 34 (Spain) + 974 (Huesca)

Used (Aragonese: Usé) is a deserted village under the local government of the municipality of Sabiñánigo, Alto Gállego, Huesca, Aragon, Spain.

Located near the Sierra y Cañones de Guara natural park, the surrounding area is a very good place for speleology and sports like rock climbing and canyoning.

== See also ==
- (in Spanish) Used (Huesca)
