= Arguisal =

Coordinates: 42.5865°N 0.3299°W

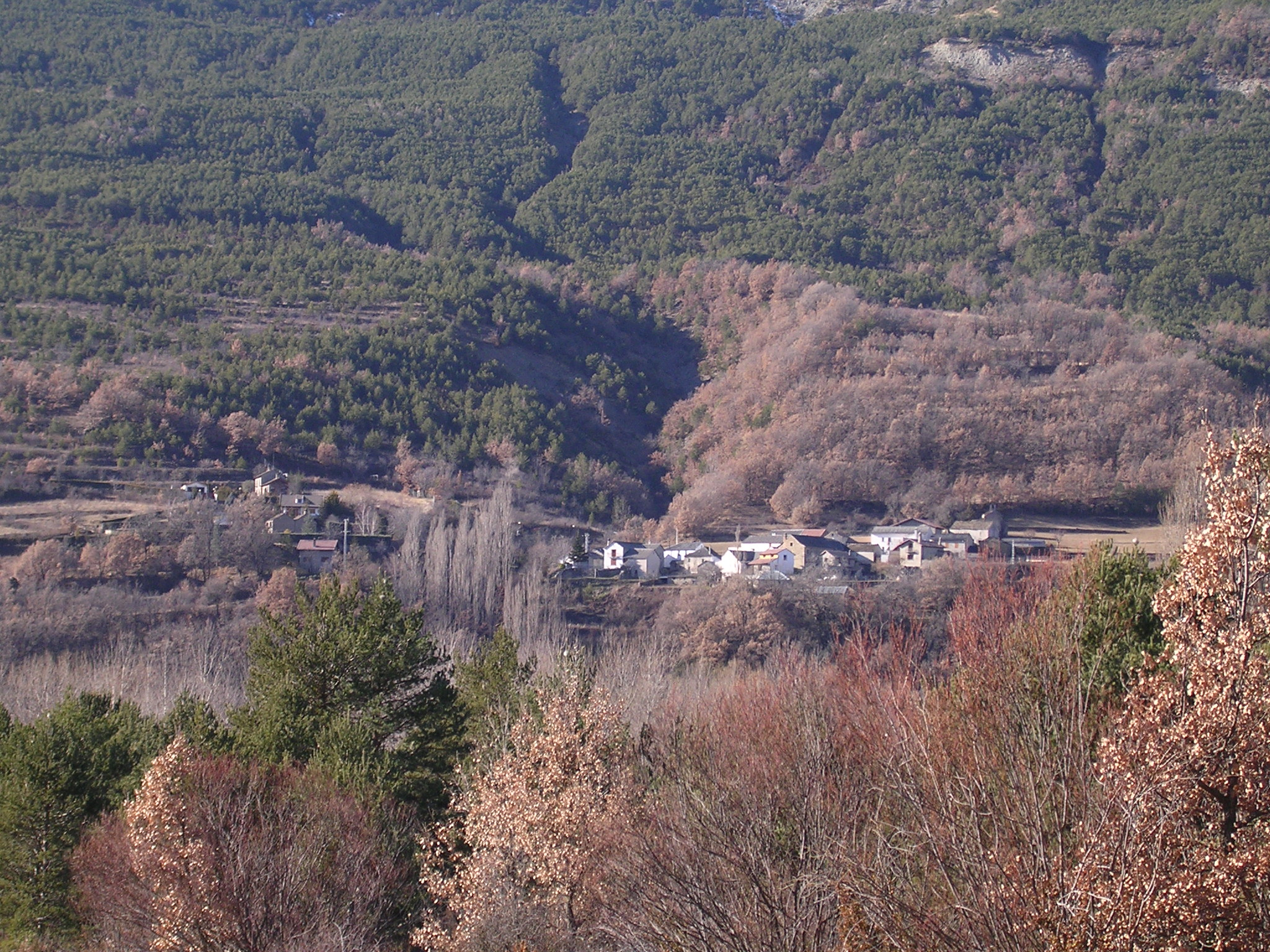
- Interactive map of Arguisal
- Country: Spain
- Province: Huesca
- Municipality: Sabiñánigo
- Elevation: 884 m (2,900 ft)

Population (2014)
  - Total: 13

Arguisal is a village under the local government of the municipality of Sabiñánigo, Alto Gállego, Huesca, Aragon, Spain.
