= Orna de Gállego =

Coordinates: 42°27′N 0°26′W

Orna de Gállego Orna de Galligo
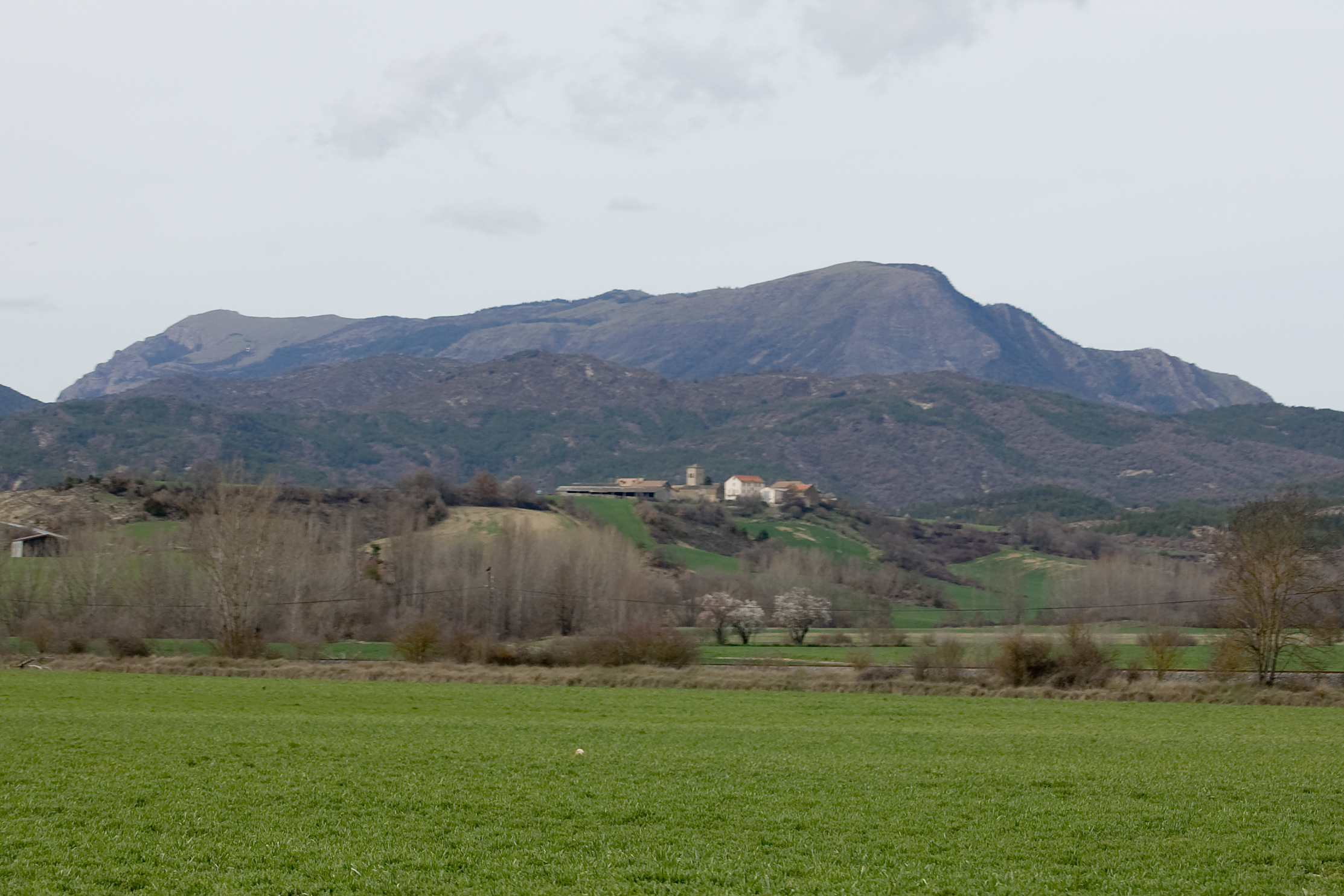
- Interactive map of Orna de Gállego
- Country: Spain
- Province: Huesca
- Municipality: Sabiñánigo
- Elevation: 789 m (2,589 ft)

Population (2007)
  - Total: 24

Orna de Gállego (Aragonese: Orna de Galligo) is a village under the local government of the municipality of Sabiñánigo, Alto Gállego, Huesca, Aragon, Spain.
