= Gésera =

- Locality
- Location within Aragon Location within Spain
- Coordinates: 42°22′46″N 0°17′35″W
- Country: Spain
- Autonomous community: Aragon
- Province: Province of Huesca
- Municipality: Sabiñánigo
- Elevation: 845 m (2,772 ft)

Population
  - Total: 8

Gésera is a locality located in the municipality of Sabiñánigo, in Huesca province, Aragon, Spain. As of 2020, it has a population of 8.

== Geography ==
Gésera is located 46km north-northeast of Huesca.
