= Gillué =

- Locality
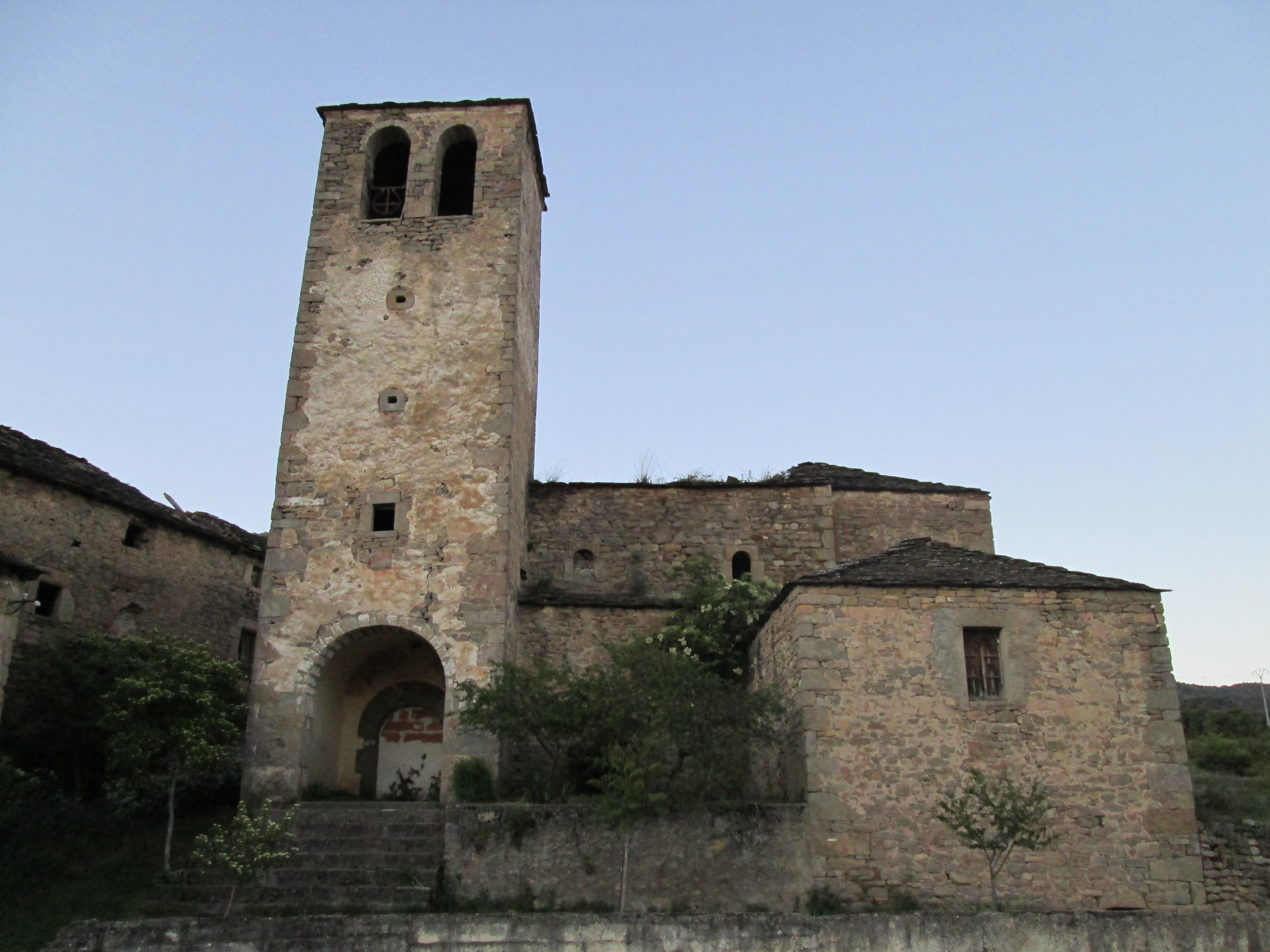

- Location within Aragon Location within Spain
- Coordinates: 42°25′10″N 0°10′29″W
- Country: Spain
- Autonomous community: Aragon
- Province: Province of Huesca
- Municipality: Sabiñánigo
- Elevation: 986 m (3,235 ft)

Population
  - Total: 8

Gillué is a locality located in the municipality of Sabiñánigo, in Huesca province, Aragon, Spain. As of 2020, it has a population of 8.

== Geography ==
Gillué is located 59km north-northeast of Huesca.
