= Sabiñánigo Alto =

- Locality
- Location within Aragon Location within Spain
- Coordinates: 42°30′52″N 0°22′28″W
- Country: Spain
- Autonomous community: Aragon
- Province: Province of Huesca
- Municipality: Sabiñánigo
- Elevation: 792 m (2,598 ft)

Population
  - Total: 41

Sabiñánigo Alto is a locality located in the municipality of Sabiñánigo, in Huesca province, Aragon, Spain. As of 2020, it has a population of 41.

== Geography ==
Sabiñánigo Alto is located 51km north of Huesca.
