= Sasal =

- Locality
- Location within Aragon Location within Spain
- Coordinates: 42°31′29″N 0°24′17″W
- Country: Spain
- Autonomous community: Aragon
- Province: Province of Huesca
- Municipality: Sabiñánigo
- Elevation: 834 m (2,736 ft)

Population
  - Total: 8

Sasal is a hamlet located in the municipality of Sabiñánigo, in Huesca province, Aragon, Spain. As of 2020, it has a population of 8.

== Geography ==
Sasal is located 54km north of Huesca.
