= Laguarta, Aragon =

Laguarta
- Locality
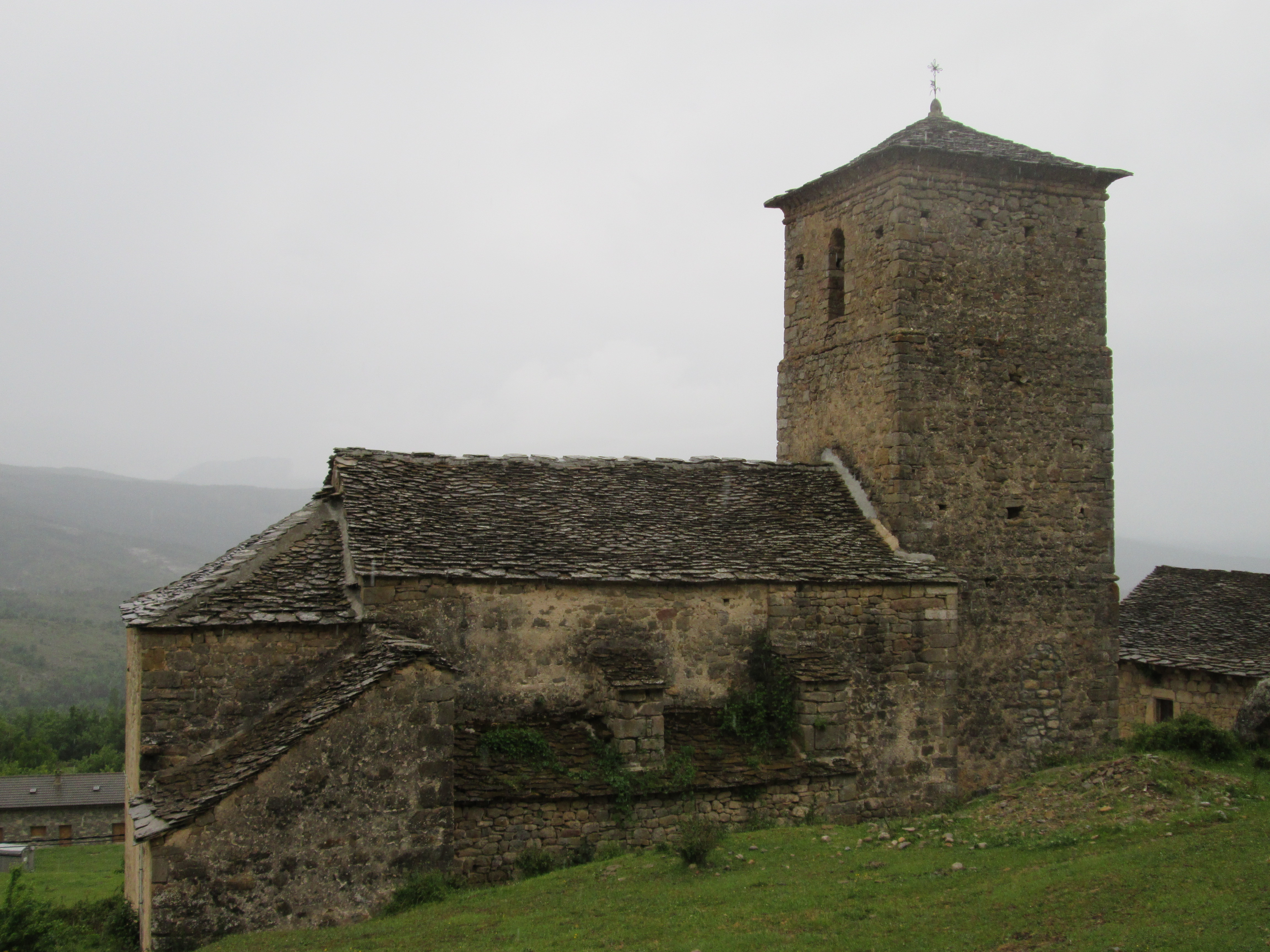

- Location within Aragon Location within Spain
- Coordinates: 42°24′47″N 0°7′4″W
- Country: Spain
- Autonomous community: Aragon
- Province: Province of Huesca
- Municipality: Sabiñánigo
- Elevation: 1,146 m (3,760 ft)

Population
  - Total: 6

Laguarta is a locality located in the municipality of Sabiñánigo, in Huesca province, Aragon, Spain. As of 2020, it has a population of 6.

== Geography ==
Laguarta is located 64 km northeast of Huesca.
