= Ordovés =

- Locality
- Location within Aragon Location within Spain
- Coordinates: 42°24′19″N 0°20′43″W
- Country: Spain
- Autonomous community: Aragon
- Province: Province of Huesca
- Municipality: Sabiñánigo
- Elevation: 796 m (2,612 ft)

Population
  - Total: 2

Ordovés is a locality located in the municipality of Sabiñánigo, in Huesca province, Aragon, Spain. As of 2020, it has a population of 2.

== Geography ==
Ordovés is located 42km north-northeast of Huesca.
