= Latrás =

- Locality
- Location within Aragon Location within Spain
- Coordinates: 42°26′19″N 0°27′31″W
- Country: Spain
- Autonomous community: Aragon
- Province: Province of Huesca
- Municipality: Sabiñánigo
- Elevation: 739 m (2,425 ft)

Population
  - Total: 12

Latrás is a locality located in the municipality of Sabiñánigo, in Huesca province, Aragon, Spain. As of 2020, it has a population of 12.
