= Layés =

- Locality
- Location within Aragon Location within Spain
- Coordinates: 42°24′42″N 0°25′17″W
- Country: Spain
- Autonomous community: Aragon
- Province: Province of Huesca
- Municipality: Sabiñánigo
- Elevation: 731 m (2,398 ft)

Population
  - Total: 1

Layés is a locality located in the municipality of Sabiñánigo, in Huesca province, Aragon, Spain. As of 2020, it has a population of 1.
