= Solanilla =

- Locality
- Location within Aragon Location within Spain
- Coordinates: 42°23′5″N 0°13′13″W
- Country: Spain
- Autonomous community: Aragon
- Province: Province of Huesca
- Municipality: Sabiñánigo
- Elevation: 924 m (3,031 ft)

Population
  - Total: 17

Solanilla is a locality located in the municipality of Sabiñánigo, in Huesca province, Aragon, Spain. As of 2020, it has a population of 17.

== Geography ==
Solanilla is located 61km north-northeast of Huesca.
