= Latas, Aragon =

Latas
- Locality
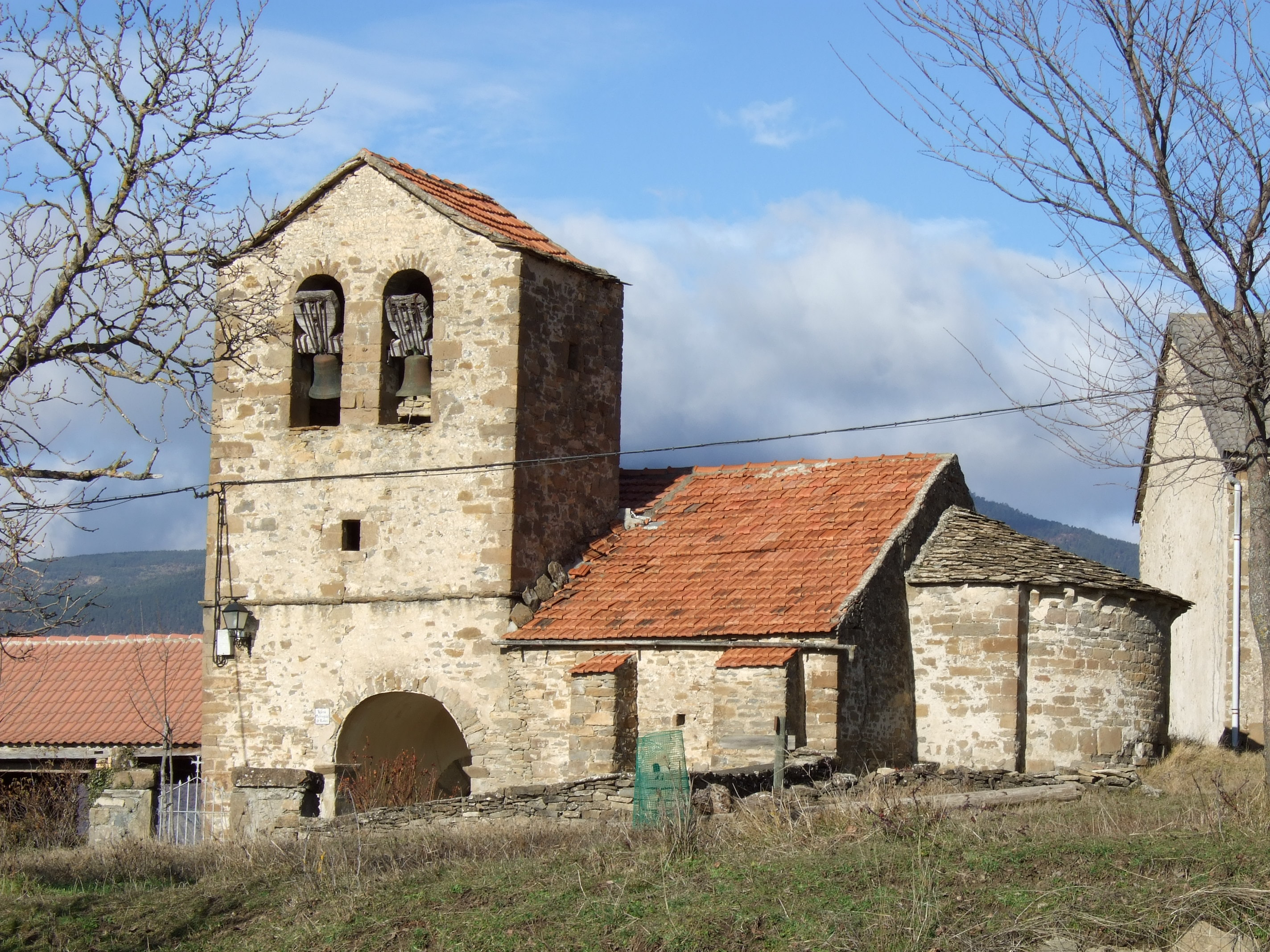

- Location within Aragon Location within Spain
- Coordinates: 42°31′35″N 0°19′52″W
- Country: Spain
- Autonomous community: Aragon
- Province: Province of Huesca
- Municipality: Sabiñánigo
- Elevation: 905 m (2,969 ft)

Population
  - Total: 75

Latas is a locality located in the municipality of Sabiñánigo, in Huesca province, Aragon, Spain. As of 2020, it has a population of 75.

== Geography ==
Latas is located 51km north of Huesca.
