= Rapún =

- Locality
- Location within Aragon Location within Spain
- Coordinates: 42°29′32″N 0°23′4″W
- Country: Spain
- Autonomous community: Aragon
- Province: Province of Huesca
- Municipality: Sabiñánigo
- Elevation: 846 m (2,776 ft)

Population
  - Total: 8

Rapún is a locality located in the municipality of Sabiñánigo, in Huesca province, Aragon, Spain. As of 2020, it has a population of 8.

== Geography ==
Rapún is located 48km north of Huesca.
