= Campares =

- Locality
- Location within Aragon Location within Spain
- Coordinates: 42°29′14″N 0°26′37″W
- Country: Spain
- Autonomous community: Aragon
- Province: Province of Huesca
- Municipality: Sabiñánigo
- Elevation: 895 m (2,936 ft)

Population
  - Total: 0

Campares is a deserted locality located in the municipality of Sabiñánigo, in Huesca province, Aragon, Spain. As of 2020, it has a population of 0.

== Geography ==
Campares is located 47 km (29 mi) north of Huesca.
