= Ipiés =

- Locality
- Location within Aragon Location within Spain
- Coordinates: 42°26′31″N 0°22′31″W
- Country: Spain
- Autonomous community: Aragon
- Province: Province of Huesca
- Municipality: Sabiñánigo
- Elevation: 793 m (2,602 ft)

Population
  - Total: 10

Ipiés is a locality located in the municipality of Sabiñánigo, in Huesca province, Aragon, Spain. As of 2020, it has a population of 10.

== Geography ==
Ipiés is located 41km north of Huesca.
