= Abenilla =

- Locality
- Location within Aragon Location within Spain
- Coordinates: 42°25′53″N 0°18′42″W
- Country: Spain
- Autonomous community: Aragon
- Province: Province of Huesca
- Municipality: Sabiñánigo
- Elevation: 1,085 m (3,560 ft)

Population
  - Total: 0

Abenilla is a deserted locality located in the municipality of Sabiñánigo, in Huesca province, Aragon, Spain. As of 2020, it has a population of 0.

== Geography ==
Abenilla is located 47km north-northeast of Huesca.
