= El Puente de Sabiñánigo =

- Locality
- Location within Aragon Location within Spain
- Coordinates: 42°30′3″N 0°21′50″W
- Country: Spain
- Autonomous community: Aragon
- Province: Province of Huesca
- Municipality: Sabiñánigo
- Elevation: 766 m (2,513 ft)

Population
  - Total: 37

El Puente de Sabiñánigo is a locality located in the municipality of Sabiñánigo, in Huesca province, Aragon, Spain. As of 2020, it has a population of 37.

== Geography ==
El Puente de Sabiñánigo is located 47km north of Huesca.
