= Hostal de Ipiés =

- Locality
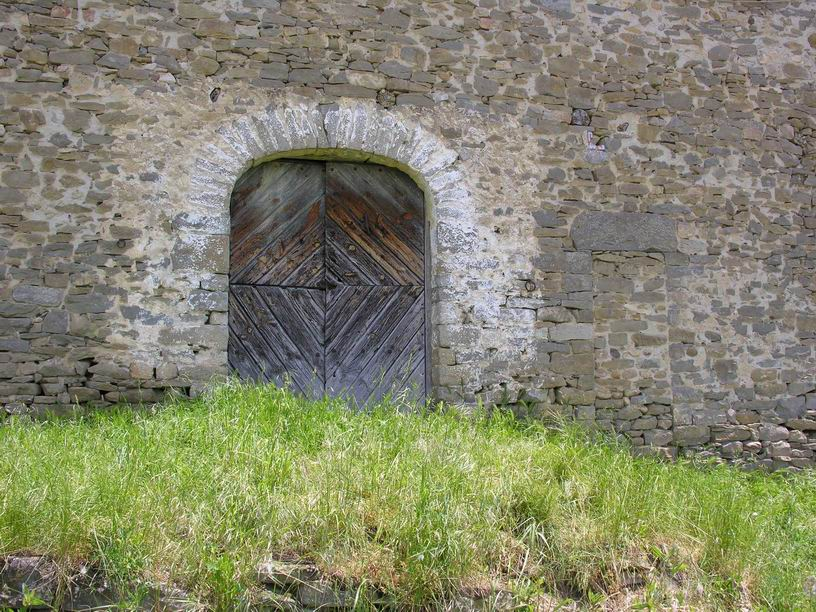

- Location within Aragon Location within Spain
- Coordinates: 42°26′20″N 0°23′44″W
- Country: Spain
- Autonomous community: Aragon
- Province: Province of Huesca
- Municipality: Sabiñánigo
- Elevation: 713 m (2,339 ft)

Population
  - Total: 38

Hostal de Ipiés is a locality located in the municipality of Sabiñánigo, in Huesca province, Aragon, Spain. As of 2020, it has a population of 38.

== Geography ==
Hostal de Ipiés is located 39km north of Huesca.
