= Acumuer =

Coordinates: 42.6208°N 0.4069°W

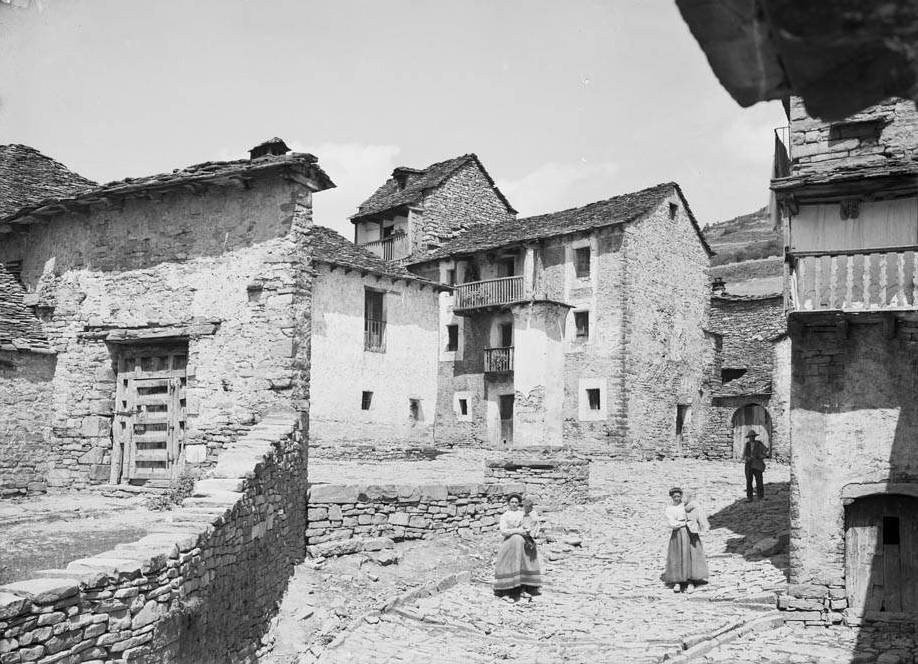
- Interactive map of Acumuer
- Country: Spain
- Province: Huesca
- Municipality: Sabiñánigo
- Elevation: 1,131 m (3,711 ft)

Population (2014)
  - Total: 13

Acumuer is a village under the local government of the municipality of Sabiñánigo, Alto Gállego, Huesca, Aragon, Spain.
