= Grasa, Aragon =

Grasa
- Locality
- Location within Aragon Location within Spain
- Coordinates: 42°22′36″N 0°18′49″W
- Country: Spain
- Autonomous community: Aragon
- Province: Province of Huesca
- Municipality: Sabiñánigo
- Elevation: 894 m (2,933 ft)

Population
  - Total: 2

Grasa is a locality located in the municipality of Sabiñánigo, in Huesca province, Aragon, Spain. As of 2020, it has a population of 2.

== Geography ==
Grasa is located 46km north-northeast of Huesca.
