= Senegüé =

- Locality
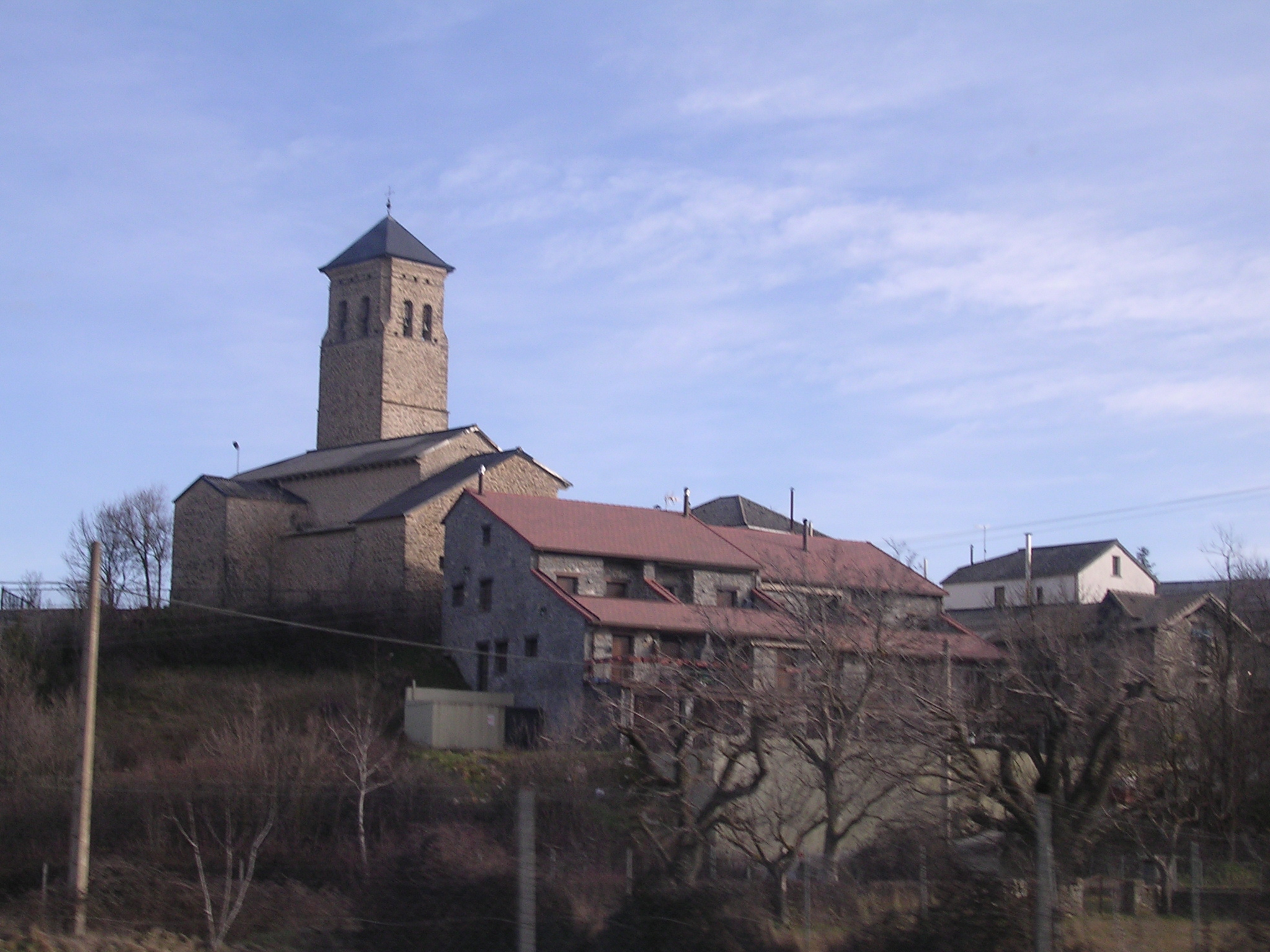

- Location within Aragon Location within Spain
- Coordinates: 42°32′54″N 0°20′42″W
- Country: Spain
- Autonomous community: Aragon
- Province: Province of Huesca
- Municipality: Sabiñánigo
- Elevation: 826 m (2,710 ft)

Population
  - Total: 112

Senegüé is a locality located in the municipality of Sabiñánigo, in Huesca province, Aragon, Spain. As of 2020, it has a population of 112.

== Geography ==
Senegüé is located 55km north of Huesca.
