= Ceresola =

- Locality
- Cerésola
- Location within Aragon Location within Spain
- Coordinates: 42°26′11″N 0°14′35″W
- Country: Spain
- Autonomous community: Aragon
- Province: Province of Huesca
- Municipality: Sabiñánigo
- Elevation: 1,105 m (3,625 ft)

Population
  - Total: 5

Ceresola or Cerésola is a locality located in the municipality of Sabiñánigo, in Huesca province, Aragon, Spain. As of 2020, it has a population of 5.

== Geography ==
Ceresola is located 58km north-northeast of Huesca.
