= Satué =

- Locality
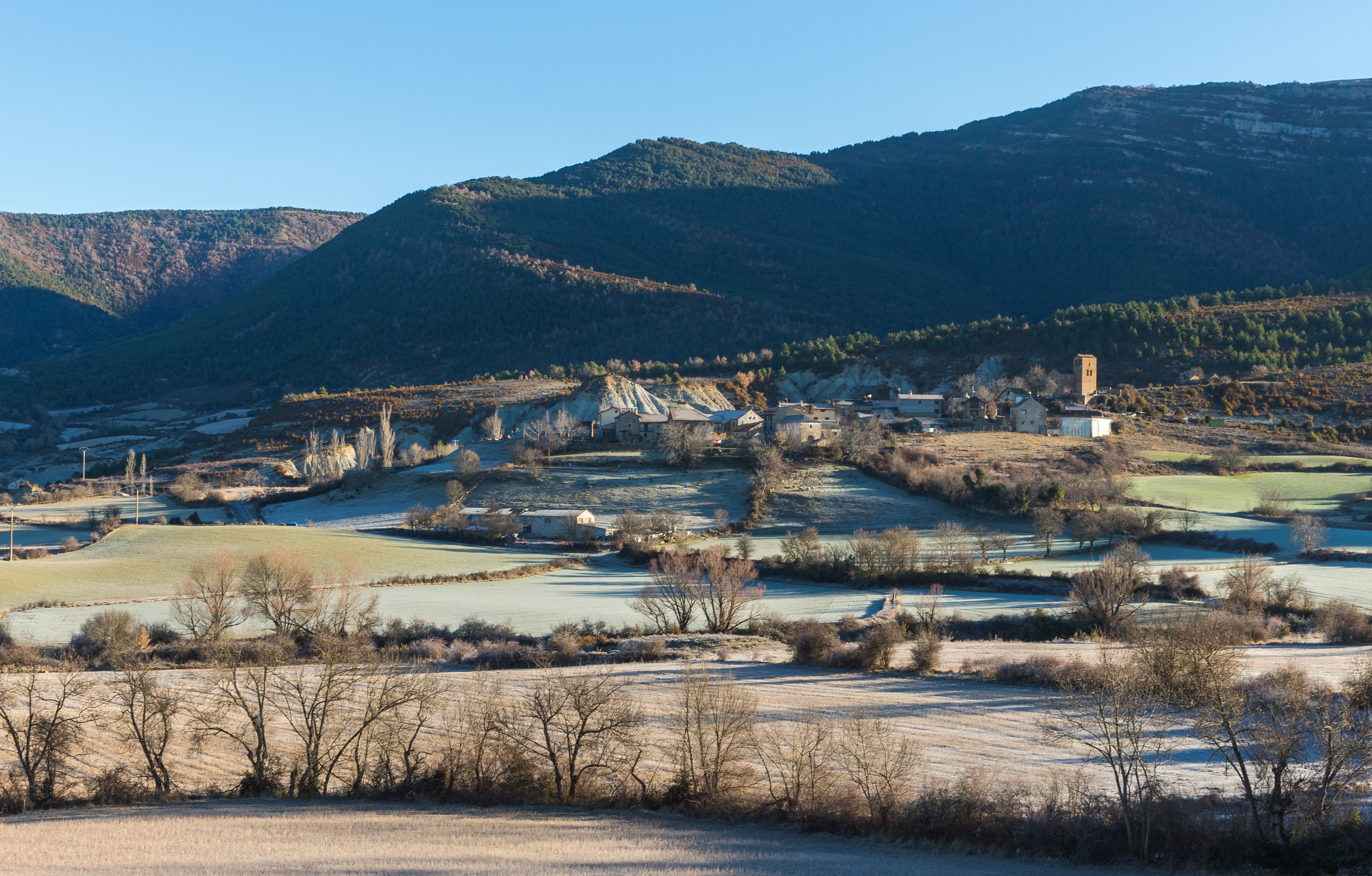

- Location within Aragon Location within Spain
- Coordinates: 42°31′46″N 0°19′7″W
- Country: Spain
- Autonomous community: Aragon
- Province: Province of Huesca
- Municipality: Sabiñánigo
- Elevation: 910 m (2,990 ft)

Population
  - Total: 8

Satué is a locality located in the municipality of Sabiñánigo, in Huesca province, Aragon, Spain. As of 2020, it has a population of 8.

== Geography ==
Satué is located 53km north of Huesca.
