= Sorripas =

- Locality
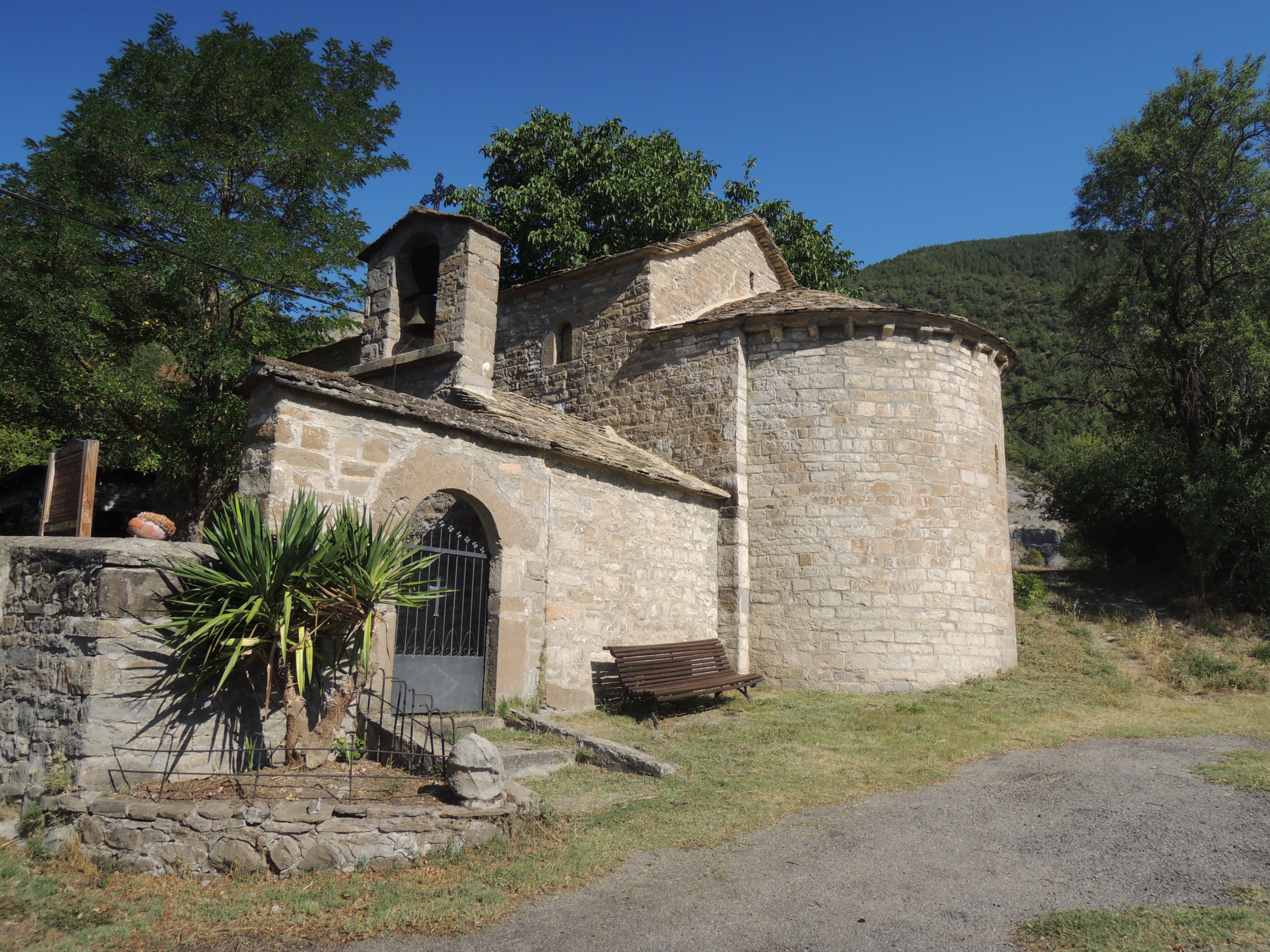

- Location within Aragon Location within Spain
- Coordinates: 42°33′14″N 0°20′50″W
- Country: Spain
- Autonomous community: Aragon
- Province: Province of Huesca
- Municipality: Sabiñánigo
- Elevation: 836 m (2,743 ft)

Population
  - Total: 41

Sorripas is a hamlet located in the municipality of Sabiñánigo, in Huesca province, Aragon, Spain. As of 2020, it had a population of 41.

== Geography ==
Sorripas is located 55km north of Huesca.
