= Allué =

Place in Aragon, Spain

Coordinates: 42.4843°N 0.3121°W

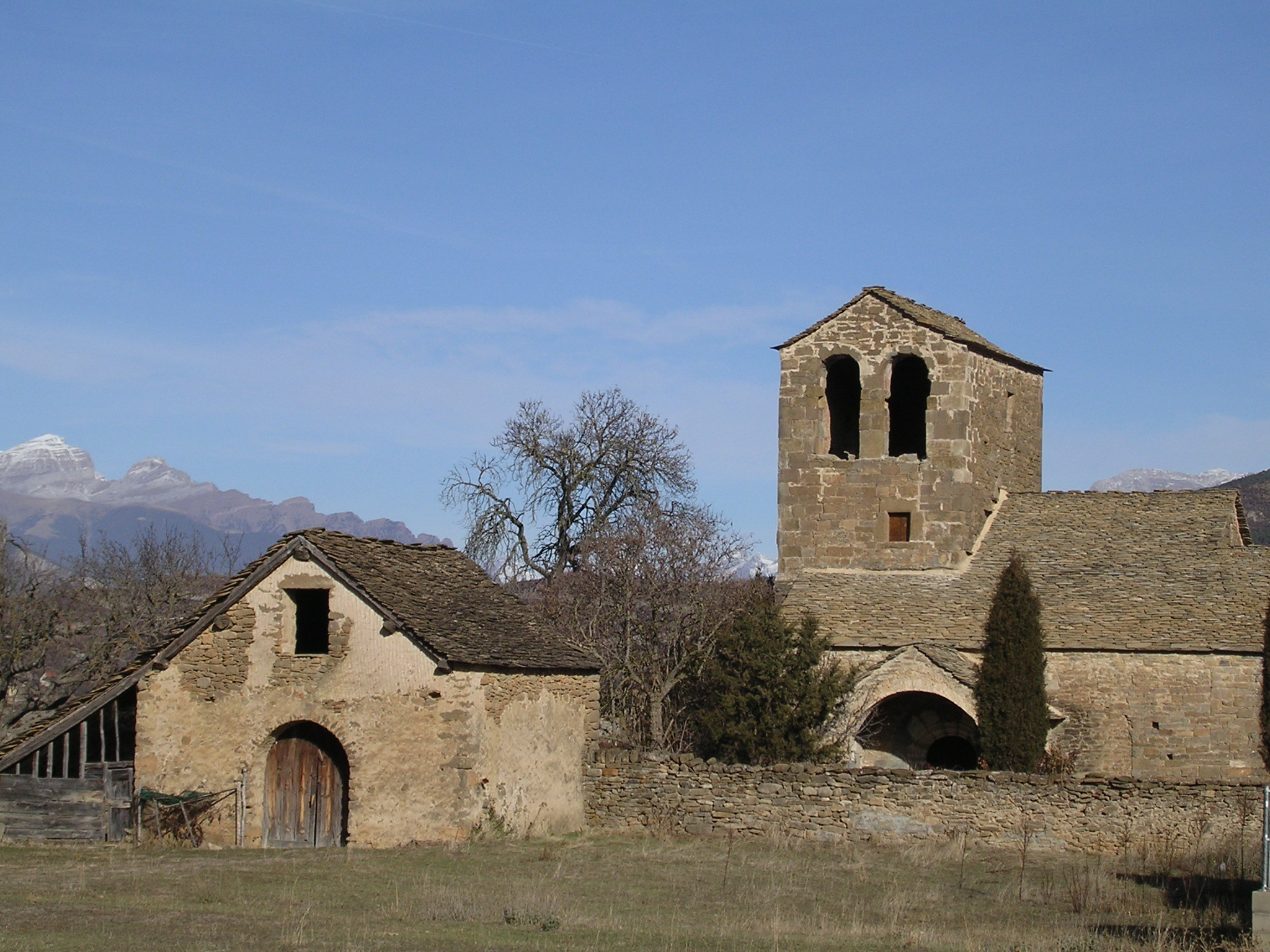
- Interactive map of Allué
- Country: Spain
- Province: Huesca
- Municipality: Sabiñánigo
- Elevation: 860 m (2,820 ft)

Population (2014)
  - Total: 7

Allué is a village under the local government of the municipality of Sabiñánigo, Alto Gállego, Huesca, Aragon, Spain. There is a Romanesque church from the 12th Century, nature trails leading into the Sierra de San Juan and views of the Spanish Pyrenees.
