= Molino de Villobas =

- Locality
- Location within Aragon Location within Spain
- Coordinates: 42°23′34″N 0°17′21″W
- Country: Spain
- Autonomous community: Aragon
- Province: Province of Huesca
- Municipality: Sabiñánigo
- Elevation: 780 m (2,560 ft)

Population
  - Total: 4

Molino de Villobas is a locality located in the municipality of Sabiñánigo, in Huesca province, Aragon, Spain. As of 2020, it has a population of 4.

== Geography ==
Molino de Villobas is located 46km north-northeast of Huesca.
