= Castillo de Lerés =

- Locality
- Castillo de Leres
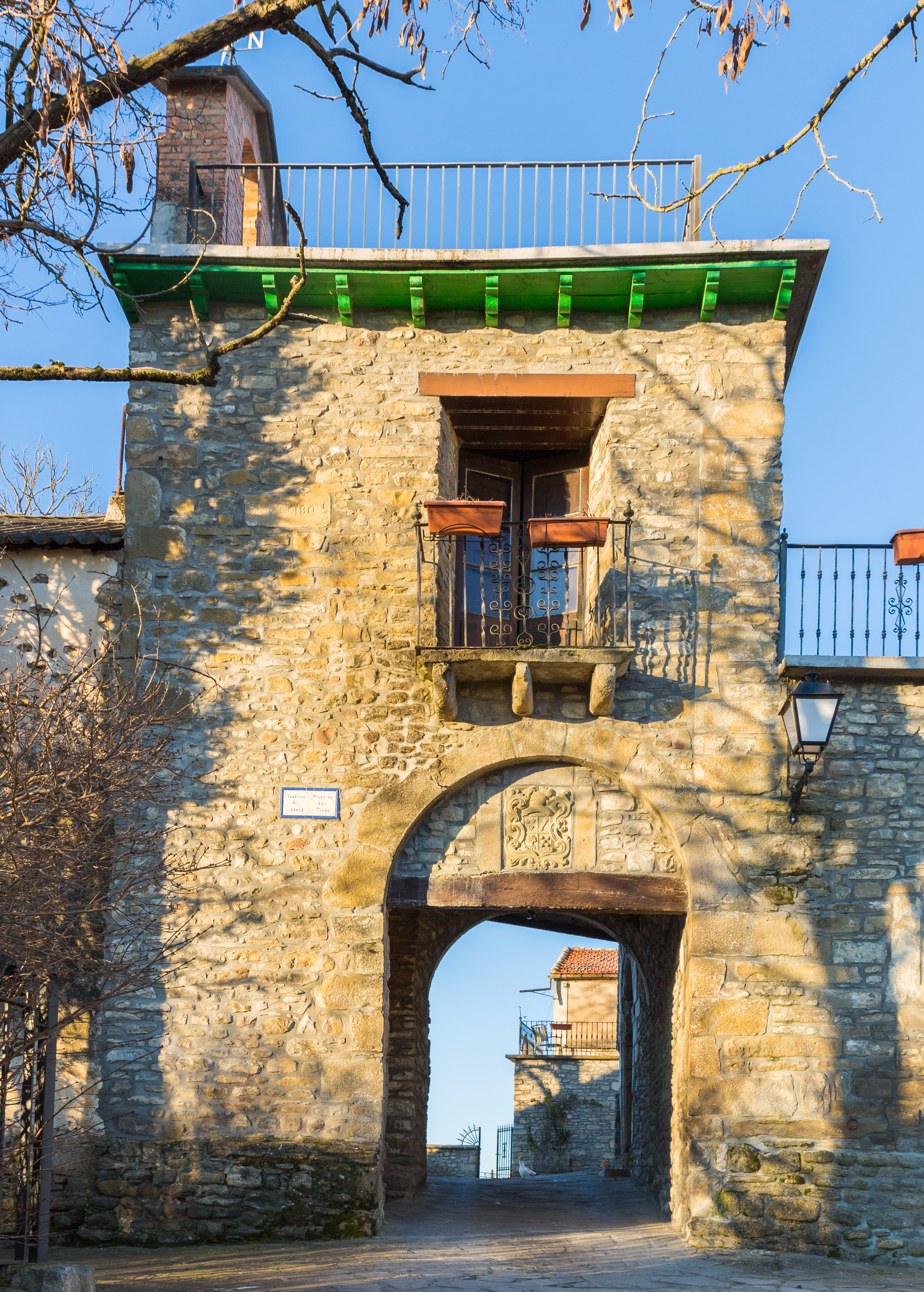

- Location within Aragon Location within Spain
- Coordinates: 42°25′20″N 0°24′42″W
- Country: Spain
- Autonomous community: Aragon
- Province: Province of Huesca
- Municipality: Sabiñánigo
- Elevation: 701 m (2,300 ft)

Population
  - Total: 4

Castillo de Lerés or Castillo de Leres is a locality located in the municipality of Sabiñánigo, in Huesca province, Aragon, Spain. As of 2020, it has a population of 4.

== Geography ==
Castillo de Lerés is located 39km north of Huesca.
