= Pardinilla =

Coordinates: 42°33′N 0°25′W

Pardinilla Pardiniella
- Interactive map of Pardinilla
- Country: Spain
- Province: Huesca
- Municipality: Sabiñánigo
- Elevation: 842 m (2,762 ft)

Population (2007)
  - Total: 27

Pardinilla (Aragonese: Pardiniella) is a village under the local government of the municipality of Sabiñánigo, Huesca, Aragon, Spain.
