= Isún de Basa =

Coordinates: 42.5116°N 0.3096°W

- Interactive map of Isún de Basa
- Country: Spain
- Province: Huesca
- Municipality: Sabiñánigo
- Elevation: 950 m (3,120 ft)

Population (2013)
  - Total: 34

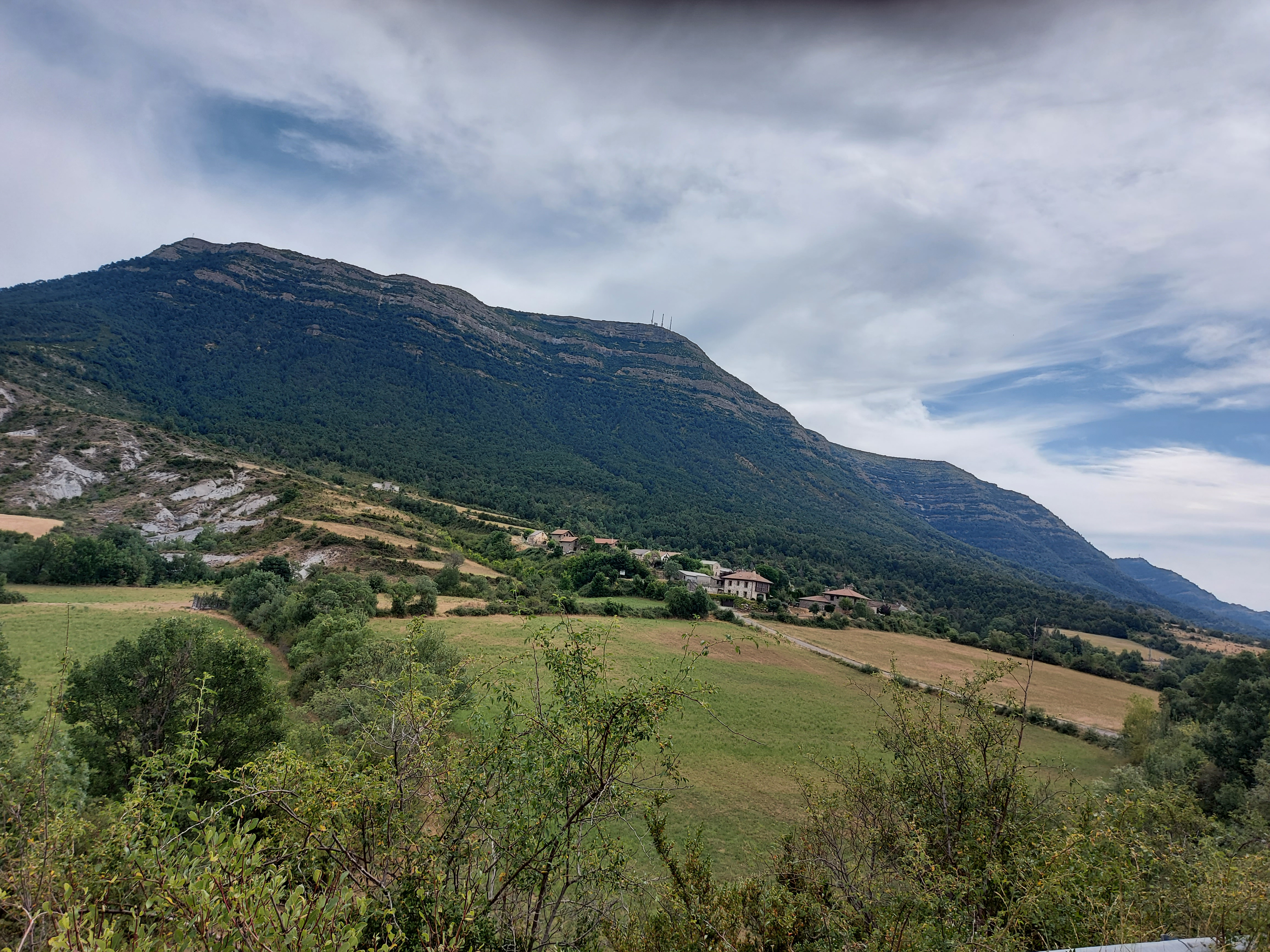
Isún de Basa. Panorámica. Sabiñánigo

Isún de Basa is a village under the local government of the municipality of Sabiñánigo, Alto Gállego, Huesca, Aragon, Spain.
