= Bara, Aragon =

Bara
- Locality
- Location within Aragon Location within Spain
- Coordinates: 42°19′46″N 0°7′36″W
- Country: Spain
- Autonomous community: Aragon
- Province: Province of Huesca
- Municipality: Sabiñánigo
- Elevation: 928 m (3,045 ft)

Population
  - Total: 9

Bara is a locality located in the municipality of Sabiñánigo, in Huesca province, Aragon, Spain. As of 2020, it has a population of 9.

== Geography ==
Bara is located 72km northeast of Huesca.
