= Ibón de Sabocos =

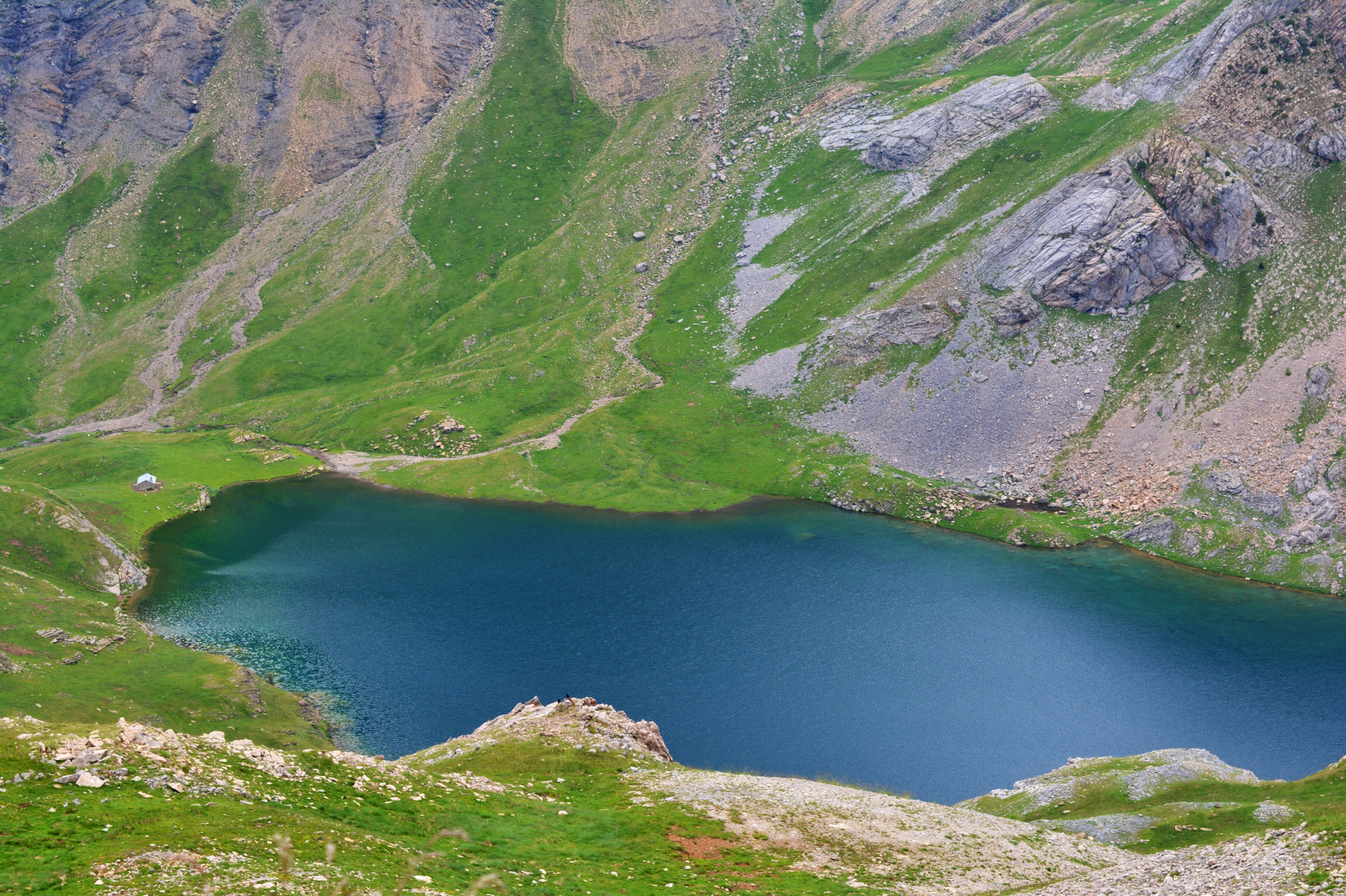
- Ibón de Sabocos.

- Location within Spain
- Location: Province of Huesca, Spain
- Coordinates: 42°41′34″N 0°15′27″W
- Type: Lake
- Max. depth: 25 metres (82 ft)
- Surface elevation: 1,905 metres (6,250 ft)

Ibón de Sabocos is a lake in the Province of Huesca, northeastern Spain. It lies at an elevation of 1,905 metres (6,250 ft) and has a maximum depth of 25 metres (82 ft).
