= Osán =

- Locality
- Location within Aragon Location within Spain
- Coordinates: 42°29′58″N 0°19′3″W
- Country: Spain
- Autonomous community: Aragon
- Province: Province of Huesca
- Municipality: Sabiñánigo
- Elevation: 875 m (2,871 ft)

Population
  - Total: 19

Osán is a locality located in the municipality of Sabiñánigo, in Huesca province, Aragon, Spain. As of 2020, it has a population of 19.

== Geography ==
Osán is located 51km north-northeast of Huesca.
