= Borrés =

- Locality
- Location within Aragon Location within Spain
- Coordinates: 42°33′31″N 0°24′19″W
- Country: Spain
- Autonomous community: Aragon
- Province: Province of Huesca
- Municipality: Sabiñánigo
- Elevation: 905 m (2,969 ft)

Population
  - Total: 16

Borrés is a locality located in the municipality of Sabiñánigo, in Huesca province, Aragon, Spain. As of 2020, it has a population of 16.

== Geography ==
Borrés is located 57km north of Huesca.
