= Larrés =

- Locality
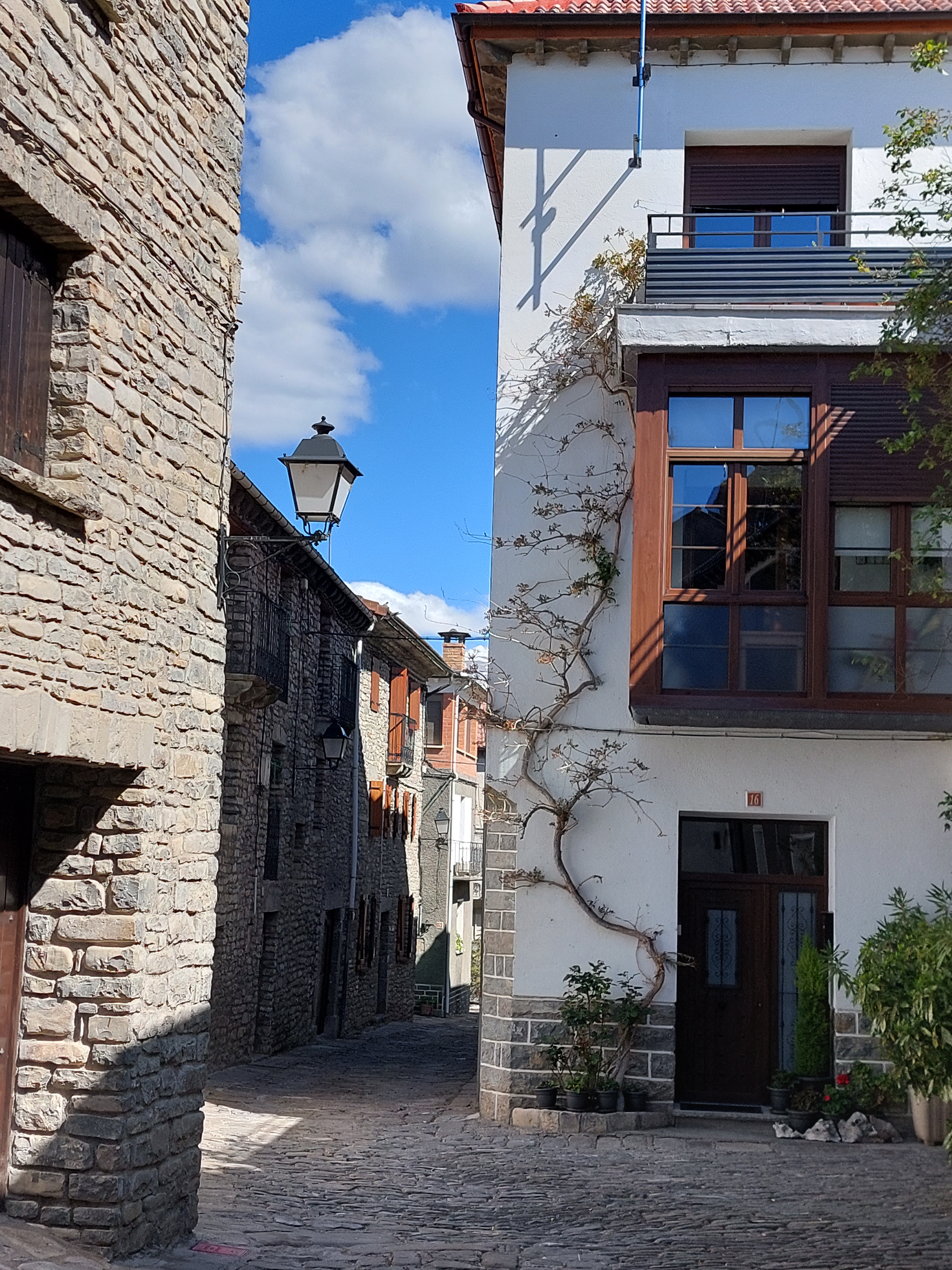
- A narrow street in Larrés

- Location within Aragon Location within Spain
- Coordinates: 42°33′41″N 0°22′58″W
- Country: Spain
- Autonomous community: Aragon
- Province: Province of Huesca
- Municipality: Sabiñánigo
- Elevation: 909 m (2,982 ft)

Population
  - Total: 70

Larrés is a locality located in the municipality of Sabiñánigo, in Huesca province, Aragon, Spain. As of 2020, it has a population of 70.

== Geography ==
Larrés is located 56km north of Huesca.
