= Sardas =

- Locality
- Location within Aragon Location within Spain
- Coordinates: 42°30′23″N 0°20′12″W
- Country: Spain
- Autonomous community: Aragon
- Province: Province of Huesca
- Municipality: Sabiñánigo
- Elevation: 817 m (2,680 ft)

Population
  - Total: 38

Sardas is a locality located in the municipality of Sabiñánigo, in Huesca province, Aragon, Spain. As of 2020, it has a population of 38.

== Geography ==
Sardas is located 49km north of Huesca.
