= Castiello de Guarga =

- Locality
- Location within Aragon Location within Spain
- Coordinates: 42°24′24″N 0°18′21″W
- Country: Spain
- Autonomous community: Aragon
- Province: Province of Huesca
- Municipality: Sabiñánigo
- Elevation: 936 m (3,071 ft)

Population
  - Total: 6

Castiello de Guarga is a locality located in the municipality of Sabiñánigo, in Huesca province, Aragon, Spain. As of 2020, it has a population of 6.

== Geography ==
Castiello de Guarga is located 45km north-northeast of Huesca.
