= Hoz de Jaca =

Hoz de Jaca (Spanish) Oz de Tena (Aragonese)
- municipality
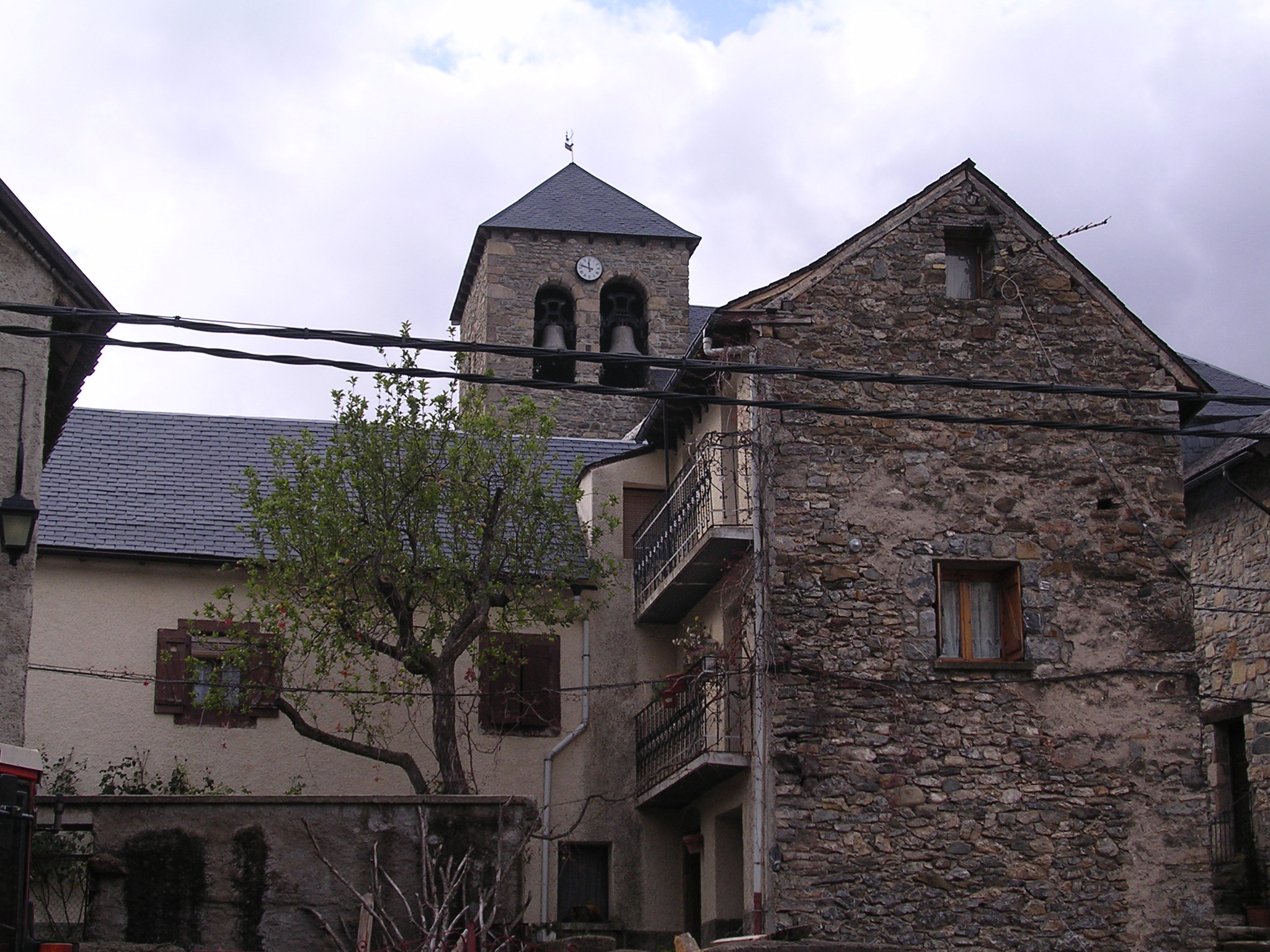

- Flag Coat of arms

- Location of Hoz de Jaca in Aragon
- Coordinates: 42°41′N 0°18′W
- Country: Spain
- Autonomous community: Aragon
- Province: Huesca

Area
  - Total: 12.45 km^{2} (4.81 sq mi)
- Elevation: 1,272 m (4,173 ft)

Population (2025-01-01)
  - Total: 81
  - Density: 6.5/km^{2} (17/sq mi)
- Time zone: UTC+1 (CET)
  - Summer (DST): UTC+2 (CEST)

Hoz de Jaca (in Aragonese: Oz de Tena) is a municipality located in the province of Huesca, Aragon, Spain. According to the 2004 census (INE), the municipality has a population of 74 inhabitants.

== See also ==
- List of municipalities in Huesca
