= Yésero =

Coordinates: 42°37′N 0°15′W

Yésero (Spanish) Yesero (Aragonese)
- municipality
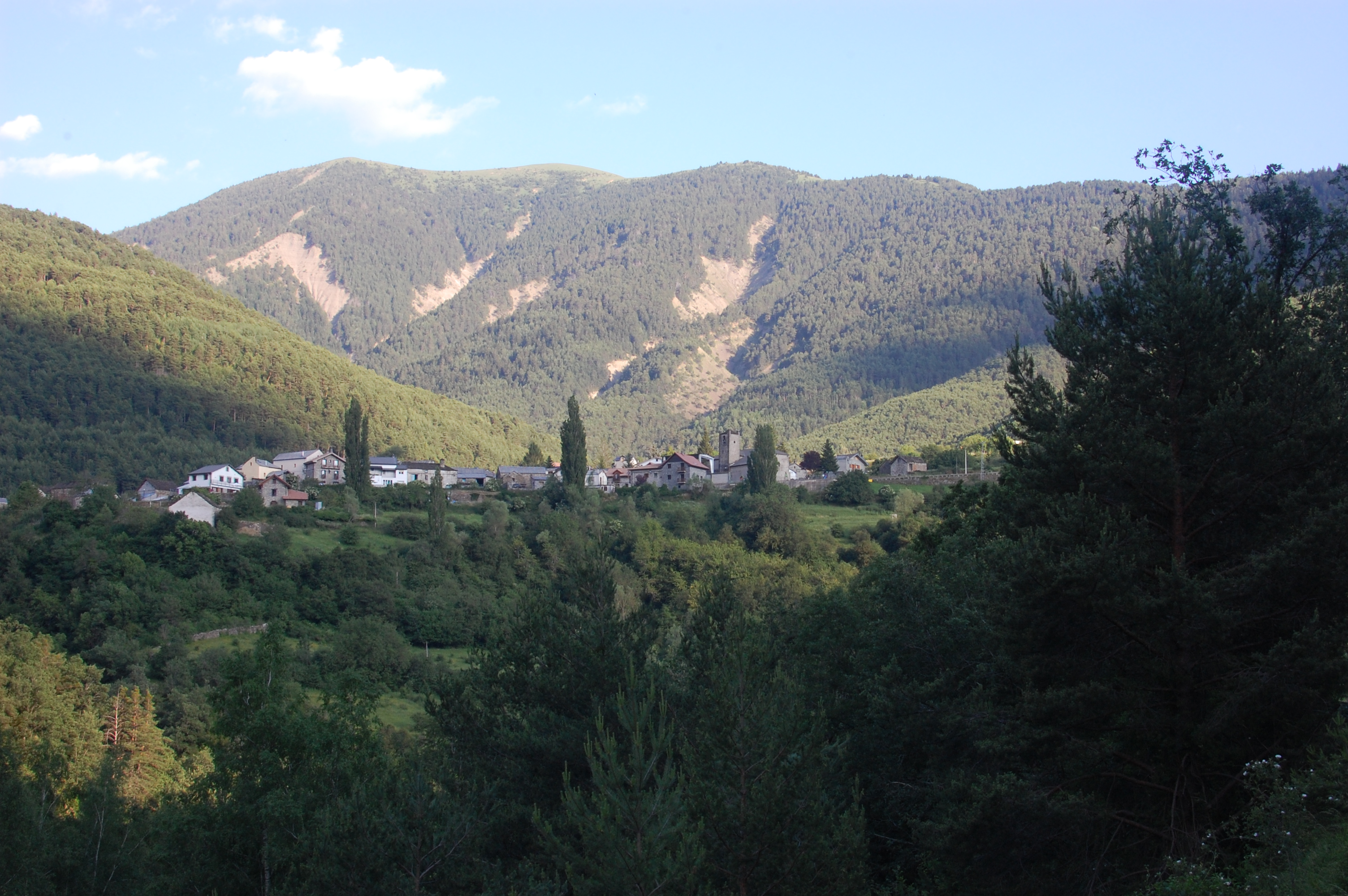
- Interactive map of Yésero (Spanish)
- Country: Spain
- Autonomous community: Aragon
- Province: Huesca

Area
  - Total: 30 km^{2} (12 sq mi)

Population (2025-01-01)
  - Total: 60
  - Density: 2.0/km^{2} (5.2/sq mi)
- Time zone: UTC+1 (CET)
  - Summer (DST): UTC+2 (CEST)

Yésero (in Aragonese: Yesero) is a municipality located in the province of Huesca, Aragon, Spain. According to the 2004 census (INE), it has a population of 77 inhabitants.

== See also ==
- List of municipalities in Huesca
