= Aurín =

- Locality
- Location within Aragon Location within Spain
- Coordinates: 42°31′25″N 0°21′4″W
- Country: Spain
- Autonomous community: Aragon
- Province: Province of Huesca
- Municipality: Sabiñánigo
- Elevation: 788 m (2,585 ft)

Population
  - Total: 39

Aurín is a locality located in the municipality of Sabiñánigo, in Huesca province, Aragon, Spain. As of 2020, it has a population of 39.

== Geography ==
Aurín is located 50km north of Huesca.
