= Yebra de Basa =

Coordinates: 42°29′N 0°18′W

- municipality
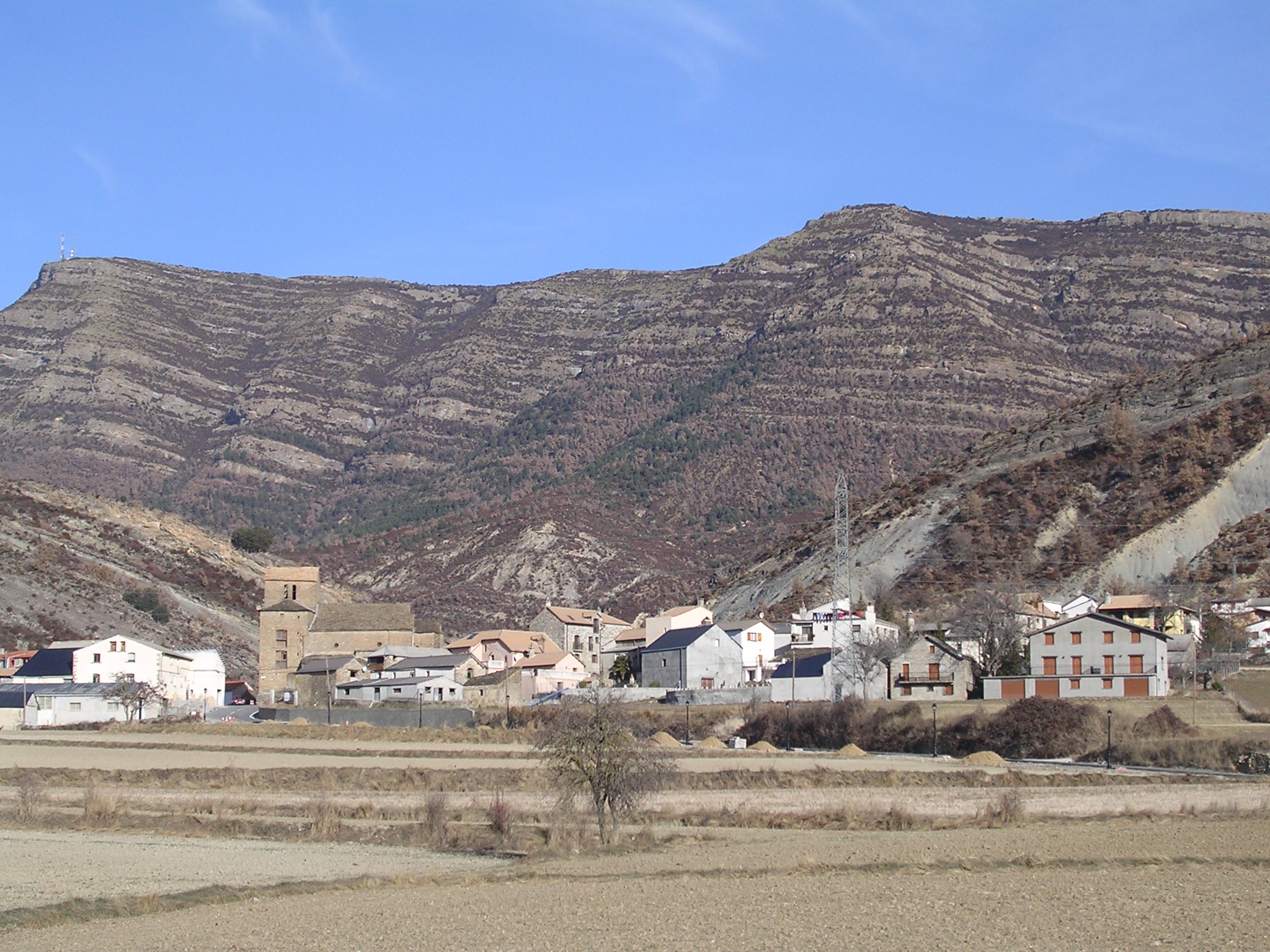
- Interactive map of Yebra de Basa
- Country: Spain
- Autonomous community: Aragon
- Province: Huesca

Area
  - Total: 90.88 km^{2} (35.09 sq mi)
- Elevation: 1,060 m (3,480 ft)

Population (2025-01-01)
  - Total: 155
  - Density: 1.71/km^{2} (4.42/sq mi)
- Time zone: UTC+1 (CET)
  - Summer (DST): UTC+2 (CEST)

Yebra de Basa is a municipality located in the province of Huesca, Aragon, Spain. According to the 2004 census (INE), the municipality had a population of 166 inhabitants.

== See also ==
- List of municipalities in Huesca
