= Alto Gállego =

Coordinates: 42°38′N 0°09′W

- Comarca
- Country: Spain
- Autonomous community: Aragon
- Province: Huesca
- Capital: Sabiñánigo
- Municipalities: List: Biescas, Caldearenas, Hoz de Jaca, Panticosa, Sabiñánigo, Sallent de Gállego, Yebra de Basa, Yésero

Area
  - Total: 1,359.8 km^{2} (525.0 sq mi)

Population (2007)
  - Total: 13,955
  - Density: 10.263/km^{2} (26.580/sq mi)
- Time zone: UTC+1 (CET)
  - Summer (DST): UTC+2 (CEST)

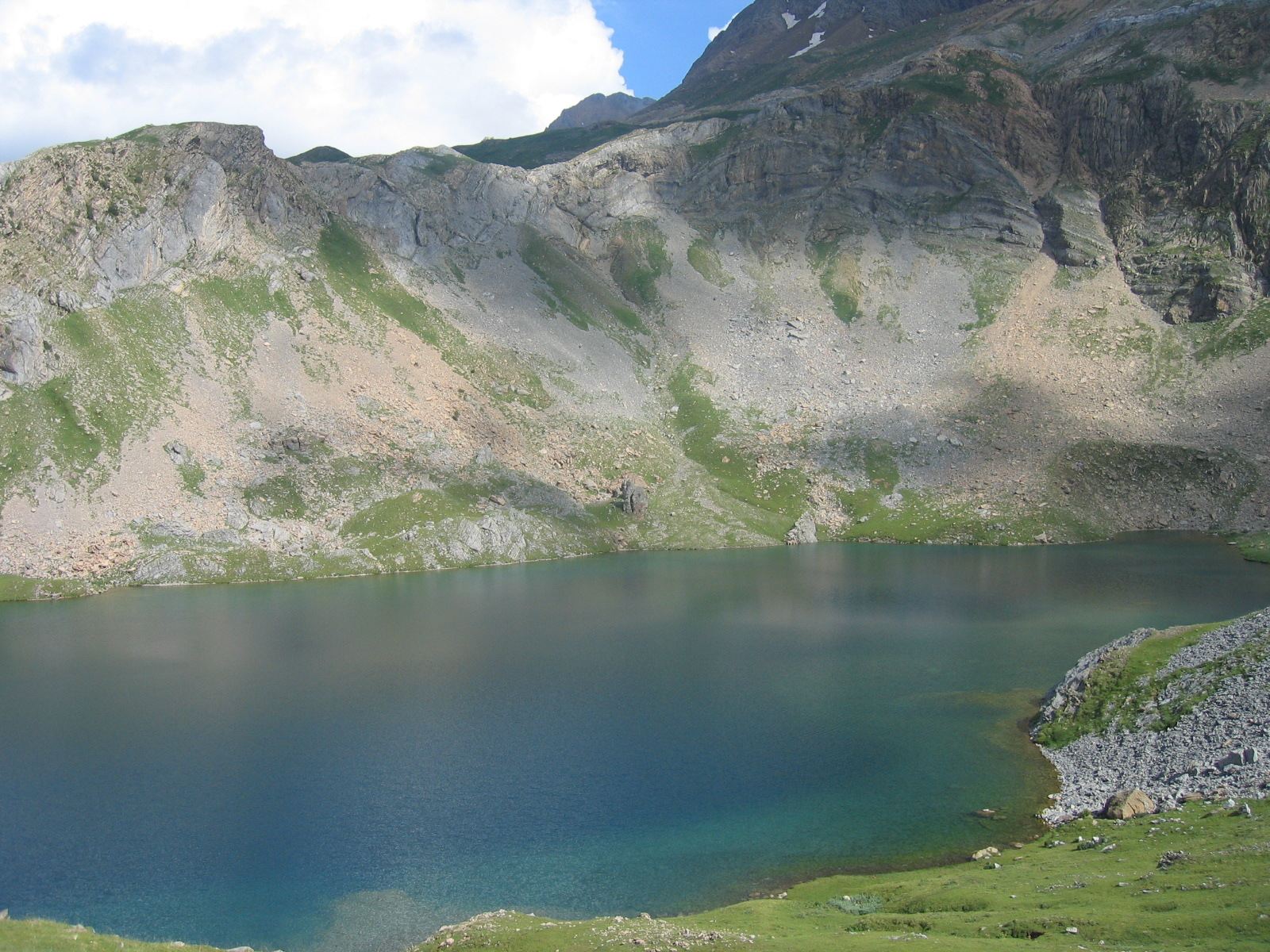
View of Ibón de Sabocos near Panticosa.

Alto Gállego (Aragonese: Alto Galligo) is a comarca located in the north of the autonomous community of Aragón, Spain. It occupies practically the entirety of the upper basin of the Río Gállego.

Historically the comarca was a part of the area known as Jacetania, the original nucleus of the old county of Aragón. The historical territories integrated into that area were the Tena Valley, the lands surrounding Biescas, and the Serrablo.

Today, Alto Gállego borders with the comarca of Jacetania to the West, the Sobrarbe to the East, the Hoya de Huesca to the South, and France to the North.

== Territory and Population ==
Municipality	Area (km^{2})	% of total	Inhabitants (2006)	% of total	Altitude (meters)
Biescas	189.1	13.9	1,513	11.2	860
Caldearenas	192.3	14.1	244	1.8	650
Hoz de Jaca	12.5	0.9	77	0.6	1,272
Panticosa	95.9	7.1	740	5.5	1,185
Sabiñánigo	586.8	43.2	9,264	68.8	780
Sallent de Gállego	162.1	11.9	1,384	10.3	1,305
Yebra de Basa	90.9	6.7	155	1.2	1,060
Yésero	30.2	2.2	80	0.6	1,132
Totals	1,359.8	100.0	13,457	100.0	-

== See also ==
- Linea P
