= Bara =

Bara may refer to:

== Names ==
- Bara (name), a given name and surname
- Barah (surname) or Borah, an Assamese surname

== Places ==
=== Bhutan ===
- Bara Gewog, a former village block of Samtse District

=== Bosnia and Herzegovina ===
- Bara Lake
- Bara, Bosanski Petrovac, a village in Bosanski Petrovac municipality

=== Germany ===
- Bära, a river in Baden-Württemberg

=== India ===
- Bara, Punjab, a village and archaeological site
- Bara, Prayagraj, a town in Uttar Pradesh
- Bara, Ghazipur, a village in Uttar Pradesh
- Bara, North 24 Parganas, a census town in West Bengal
- Bara, Raebareli, a village in Uttar Pradesh

=== Iran ===
- Bara, Iran, a village in Kurdistan Province

=== Mali ===
- Bara, Gao Region, a village and rural commune

=== Nepal ===
- Bara District, Nepal

=== Nigeria ===
- Bara, Nigeria, a town in Oyo State

=== Pakistan ===
- Bara, Khyber Pakhtunkhwa, a town in the Khyber District, Khyber Pakhtunkhwa
- Bara Tehsil, a tehsil in Khyber Pakhtunkhwa
- Bara River, a river in Khyber District

=== Poland ===
- Bara, West Pomeranian Voivodeship, Poland

=== Romania ===
- Bara, Timiș, a commune in Timiș County
- Bâra, a commune in Neamț County
- Bâra, a village in Bereni Commune, Mureș County
- Bâra, a village in Balta Doamnei Commune, Prahova County

=== Slovakia ===
- Bara, Trebišov, a village in Trebišov District, Slovakia

=== Spain ===
- Bara, Aragon, a village in Sabiñánigo, Spain

=== Sudan ===
- Barah, Sudan, a town in Kurdufan, Sudan

=== Sweden ===
- Bara Hundred, a locality in Scania
- Bara, Scania, Svedala Municipality
- Bara, part of Hörsne-Bara, Gotland

=== Syria ===
- Bara, Syria, a village

=== UK ===
- Bara, East Lothian, a parish in Scotland

== Other uses ==
- Bara, a former Chilean unit of measurement
- Bara or Tetsuo Sakaibara, Japanese musician and former member of Merzbow
- Bara, a unit of absolute pressure; see bar (unit)
- Bara (Henner), a painting by Jean Jacques Henner
- Bara (drum), a drum used in Burkina Faso and Côte d'Ivoire
- Bara (1982 film), an Indian Kannada-language film
- Bara (1999 film), a Malaysian Malay-language film
- Bara (genre), a genre of Japanese media, especially comics, aimed at gay men
- Bara (insect), a genus of insects in the family Tetrigidae called ground-hoppers
- Bara people, a people of central southern Madagascar
- Bara Rifles, a Pakistani paramilitary regiment
- Bara Sangihe, a traditional sword from Indonesia
- British Automation and Robot Association
- Chris Hani Baragwanath Hospital or Bara, a hospital in Johannesburg, South Africa
- Vada (food) or Bara, a savoury fritter-type snack from South India

== See also ==
- Bara culture, a strand of the Indus Valley Civilization in Bronze Age India
- Bara language (disambiguation)
- Vara (disambiguation)
- Vada (disambiguation)
