= Wada =

Wada or WADA may refer to:

== People ==
- Wada (Japanese surname), a list of people of Japanese ancestry
- Inuwa Wada (1917-2015), Nigerian politician
- Mian Wada (died 1085), Islamic scholar born in what is now Pakistan
- Tawar Umbi Wada (1957–2010), Nigerian politician

== Places ==
- Wada, Chiba, Japan
- Wada, Nagano, Japan
- Vada, Palghar or Wada, Maharashtra, India
- Wada Station, a railway station in Akita, Japan

== Other uses ==
- Wade (folklore)
- Wada (house), a type of mansion in Western India
- Wada language, a Banda language of Central Africa
- WADA-LD, a former television station licensed to Wilmington, North Carolina, United States
- WOHS, formerly WADA, a radio station in North Carolina, United States
- E. Y. Wada, a New York-based fashion label co-founded by Shuji Wada
- World Anti-Doping Agency, an organization formed to prevent the use of performance enhancing drugs in sports
- Vada (food), Indian fried snack
- Wada test, a neurological diagnostic test

== See also ==
- Vaada (disambiguation)
- Vada (disambiguation)
