= 和田 =

和田 may refer to:

Cantonese Chinese reading Wo Tin

- Wo Tin Estate, a public housing estate in Tuen Mun, Hong Kong

Mandarin Chinese reading Hétián

- Hotan, city in Xinjiang, People's Republic of China
- Hotan Prefecture in Xinjiang, People's Republic of China

Japanese reading Wada:

- Wada (Japanese surname), a list of people of Japanese ancestry
- Wada, Chiba, former town in Awa District, Chiba, Japan
- Wada, Nagano, former village in Chiisagata District, Nagano, Japan
- Wada Station, Akita, Akita Prefecture, Japan
