= Bara (name) =

Bara is a given name and a surname. As a masculine Arabic name, Bara (براء) means "innocence". As a feminine Old Norse name, Bára means wave. Bára is a Czech-language diminutive of the name Barbora or Barbara.

== Given name ==
- Bara Mamadou Ndiaye (born 1991), Senegalese football player in Turkey
- Bára Nesvadbová (born 1975), Czech writer and journalist
- Bára Gísladóttir (born 1989), Icelandic musician and composer

== Surname ==
- Ali Hadi Bara (1906–1971), Turkish sculptor
- Céline Bara (born 1978), French pornographic film actress
- Edgar Bara (1876–1962), French mandolin player, author and composer
- Guy Bara (1923–2003), Belgian comic artist
- Irina Maria Bara (born 1995), Romanian tennis player
- Johan Bara (1581–1634), Dutch painter, designer and engraver
- John Bara (1926–2012), American politician
- Joseph Bara (1779–1793), French drummer boy mythologised by the French First Republic
- Jules Bara (1835–1900), Belgian liberal politician
- Margit Bara (1928–2016), Hungarian film actress
- Nina Bara (c. 1920-1990), American film actress
- Theda Bara (1885–1955), American silent film actress
- Tina Bara (born 1962), German photographer

== See also ==
- Al-Bara ibn Azib (died 640), a companion of the Islamic prophet Muhammad
- Al-Bara' ibn `Azib (died 690), a companion of the Islamic prophet Muhammad
- Wild Bára
