= Kotla Nihang Khan Fort =

Kotla Nihang Khan Fort ਕੋਟਲਾ ਨਿਹੰਗ ਖ਼ਾਨ ਦਾ ਕਿਲ੍ਹਾ
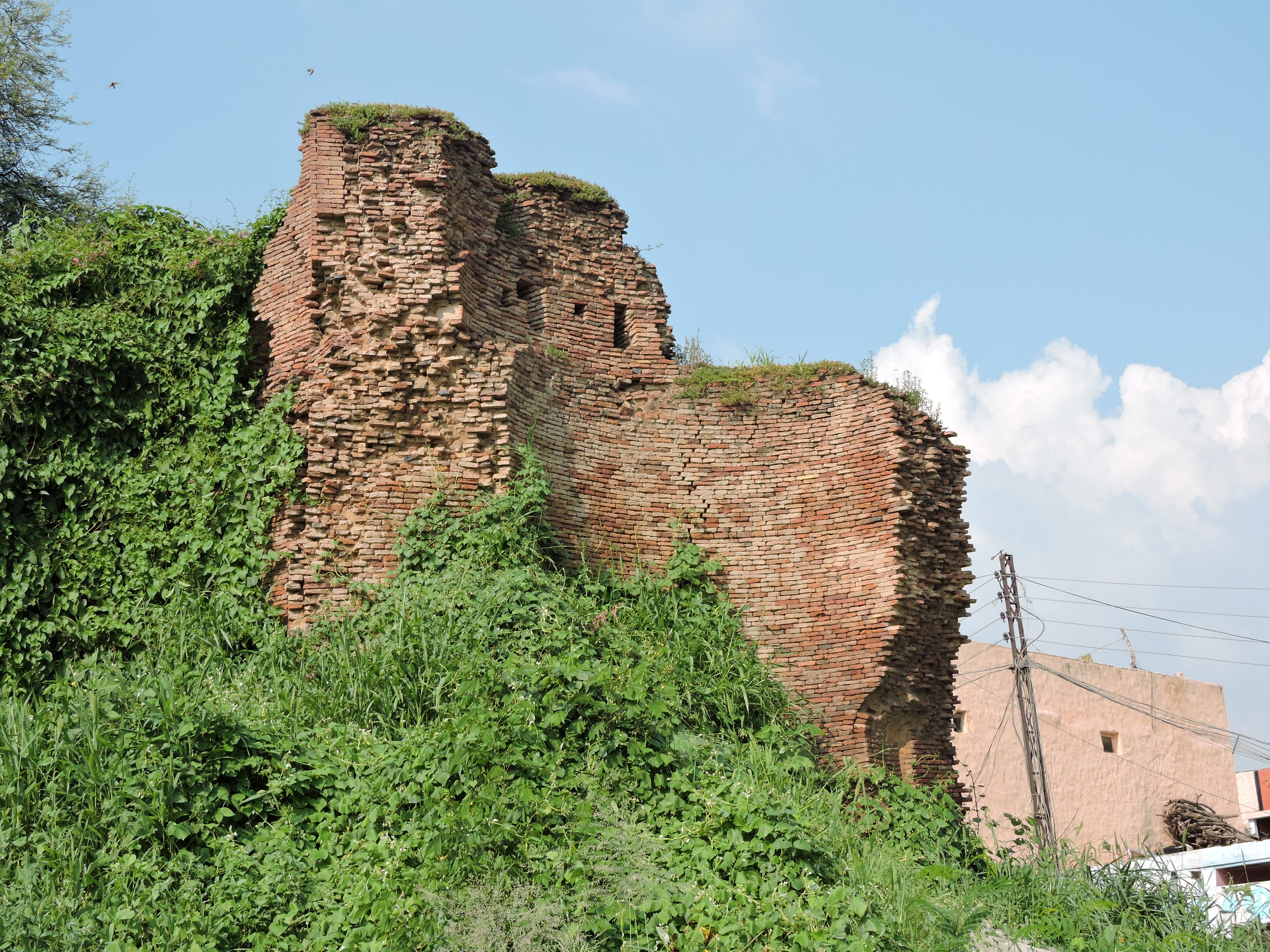
- Ruins of Kotla Nihang Khan Fort
- Interactive map of Kotla Nihang Khan Fort ਕੋਟਲਾ ਨਿਹੰਗ ਖ਼ਾਨ ਦਾ ਕਿਲ੍ਹਾ
- 30.58°N 76.31°E
- Location: kotla Nihang Khan, Rupnagar, Punjab, India

History
- Built: 17th Century

Site notes
- Architect(s): Mughal, Nihang Khan Zimindar Ruler of Princely State of Kotla Nihang Khan
- Architectural style: Mughal architecture

Kotla Nihang Khan Fort is a fort located in Kotla Nihang Khan village nearly 3 km from Rupnagar city of Punjab, India. Kotla Nihang Khan was the headquarter of the Afghan Zimindar ruler Nihang Khan who ruled over 80 villages in the 17 Century.The village and the fort is named after this local chief, Nihang Khan who was contemporary and associate of 10 Guru of Sikhs sri Guru Gobind Singh.This place has a great significance in the history and memories of Sikhs due to supporting role of Nihang Khan for the Sikhs, especially during war period crisis. Nihang Khan had cordial relations with Guru Gobind Singh that is why Guru ji visited this fort three times in his lifetimes as a shelter place during various wars periods. Guru Gobind Singh first visited Kotla Nihang Khan while returning from Paonta Sahib to Anandpur Sahib. He again passed through this place while returning from viewing the solar eclipse in Kurukshetra 1702-1703. The third visit was on 6 December 1705 when Guru Gobind Singh, after crossing the Sarsa river, on being forced to leave Anandpur, reached Kotia Nihang Khan, after detaching 100 of his warriors under Bhai Bachittar Singh to cover the forces of enemy following him . He safely reached in Nihang Khan's residence, Kotla. While relaxing in Nihang Khan's house, he waited for Bhai Bachchittar Singh. But most of the Sikhs with Bhai Bachchiittar Singh were killed in war and Bhai Bachchiittar Singh himself was seriously wounded and was taken to Nihang Khan's house by Sahibzada Ajit Singh the elder son of Guru Gobind Singh and Bhai Madan Singh where he died despite being cared by Nihang Khan and his daughter Mumtaj.

== Present status ==
At present the fort is under private ownership. Most part of the original structure of the fort has been destroyed and very minor part is visible and that too in the form of ruins. However, a memorial of Bhai Bachittar Singh is being constructed here by purchasing some land of fort from the present owner of the fort.

== Gallery ==
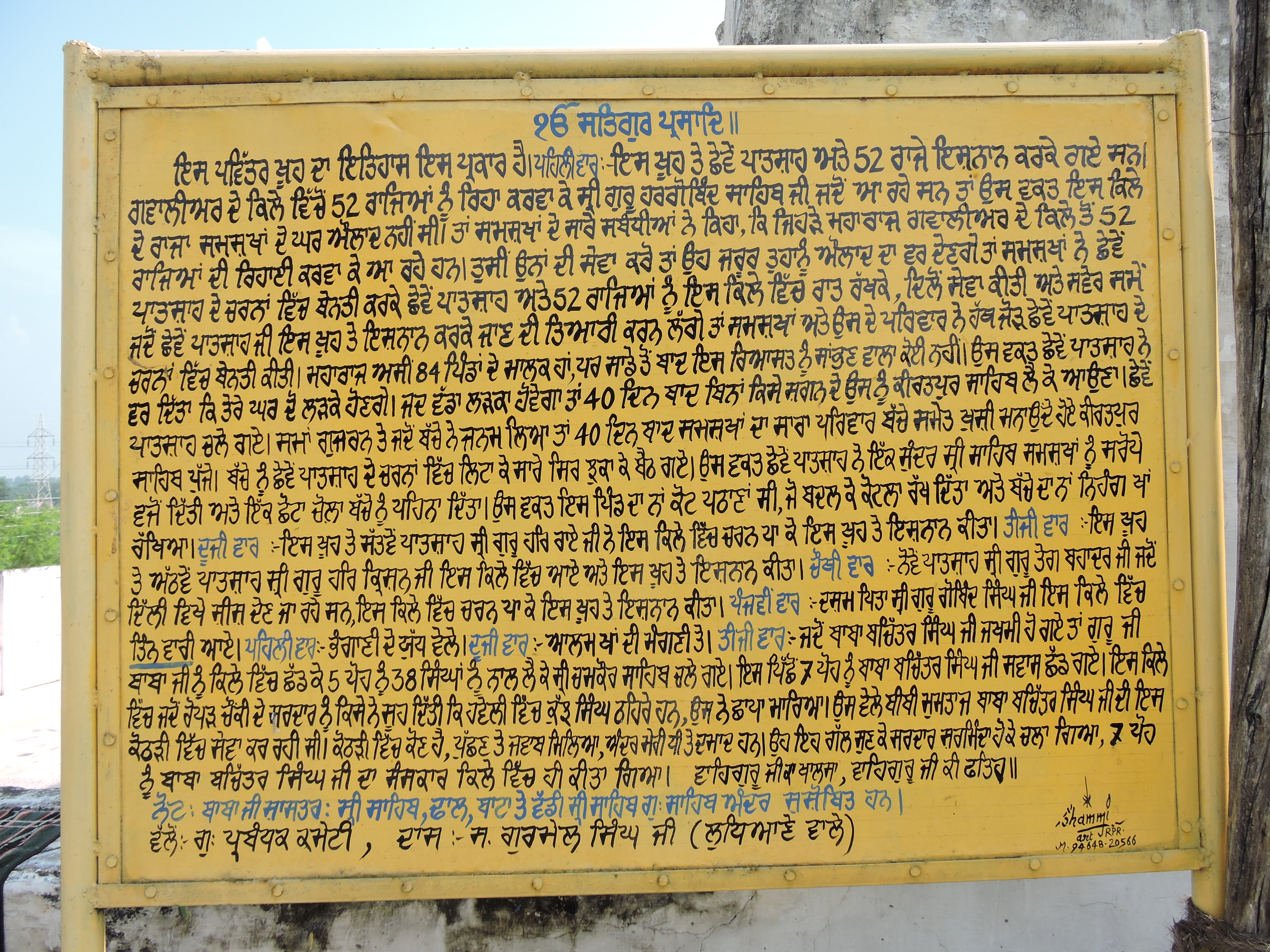
Description of history of Fort in Gurmukhi, Kotla Nihang Khan, Rupnagar, Punjab, India

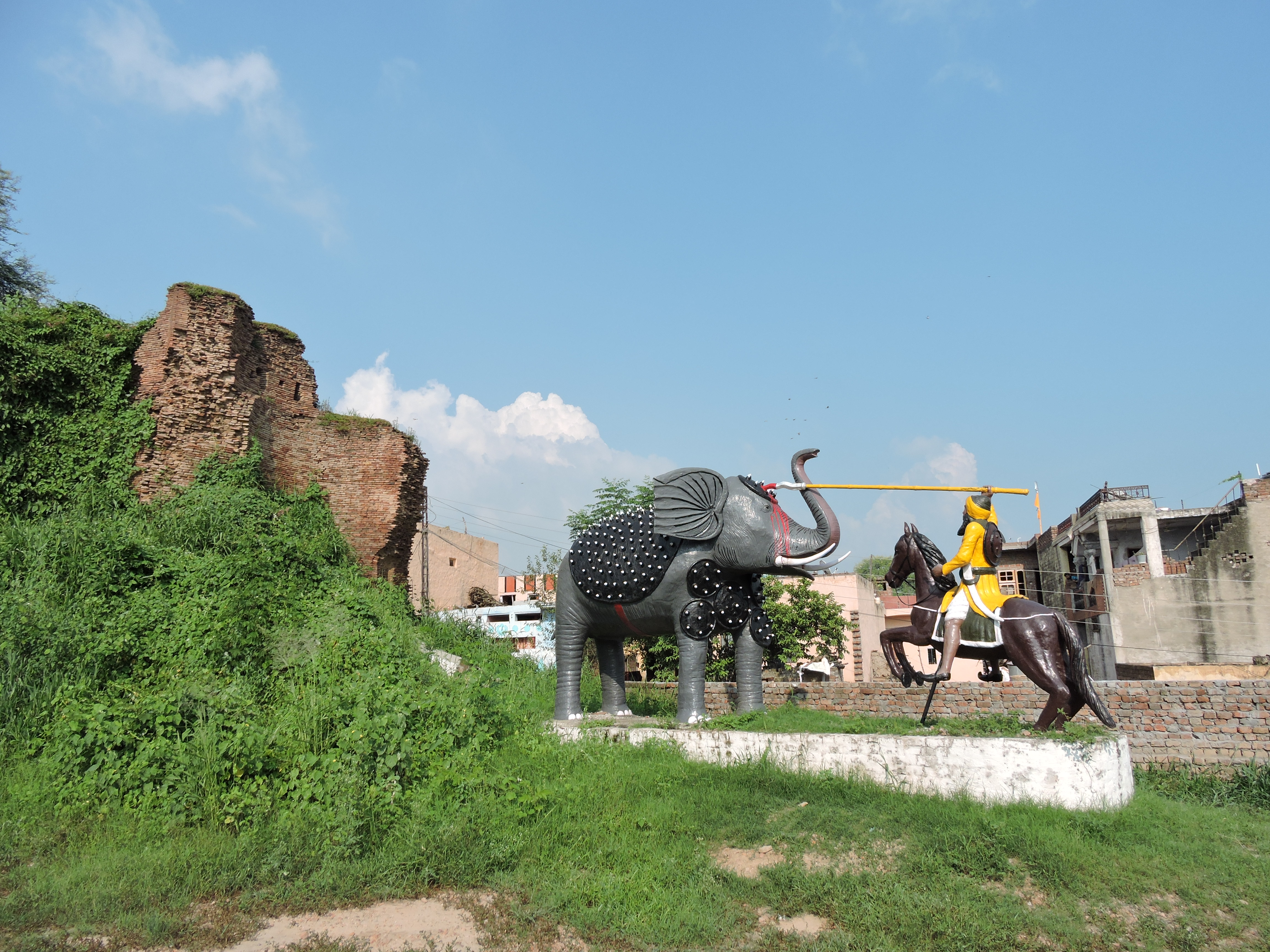
Fort of Kotla Nihang Khan, now memorial of Bachittar Singh village Kotla Nihang Khan, Rupnagar district, Punjab, India

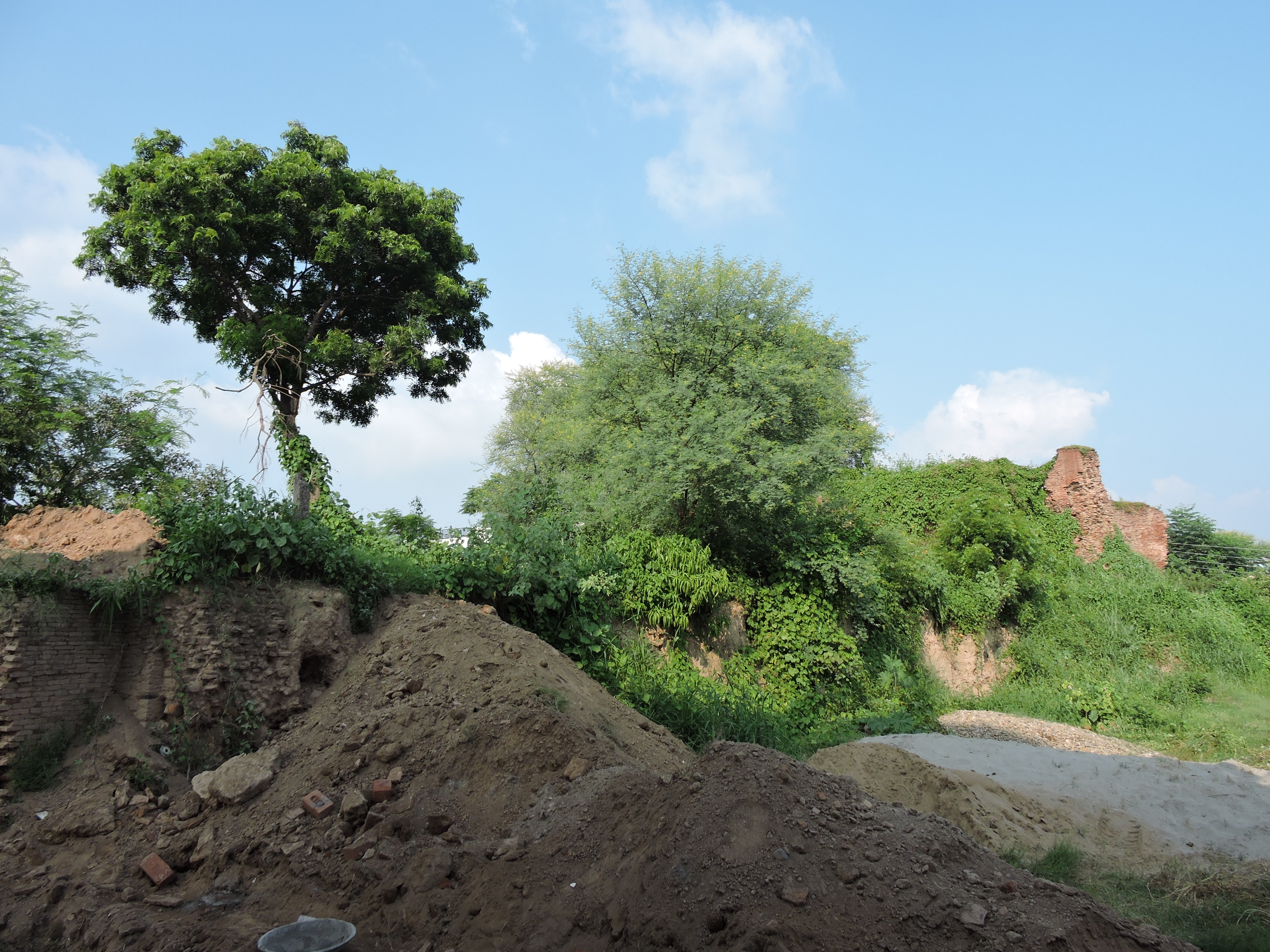
Ruins of Fort of Kotla Nihang Khan, Rupnagar district, Punjab, India

== See also ==
- Kotla Nihang Khan
- Nihang Khan
- Bachittar Singh
