= Bachittar Singh =

Sikh hero

Bhai Bachittar Singh Shaheed
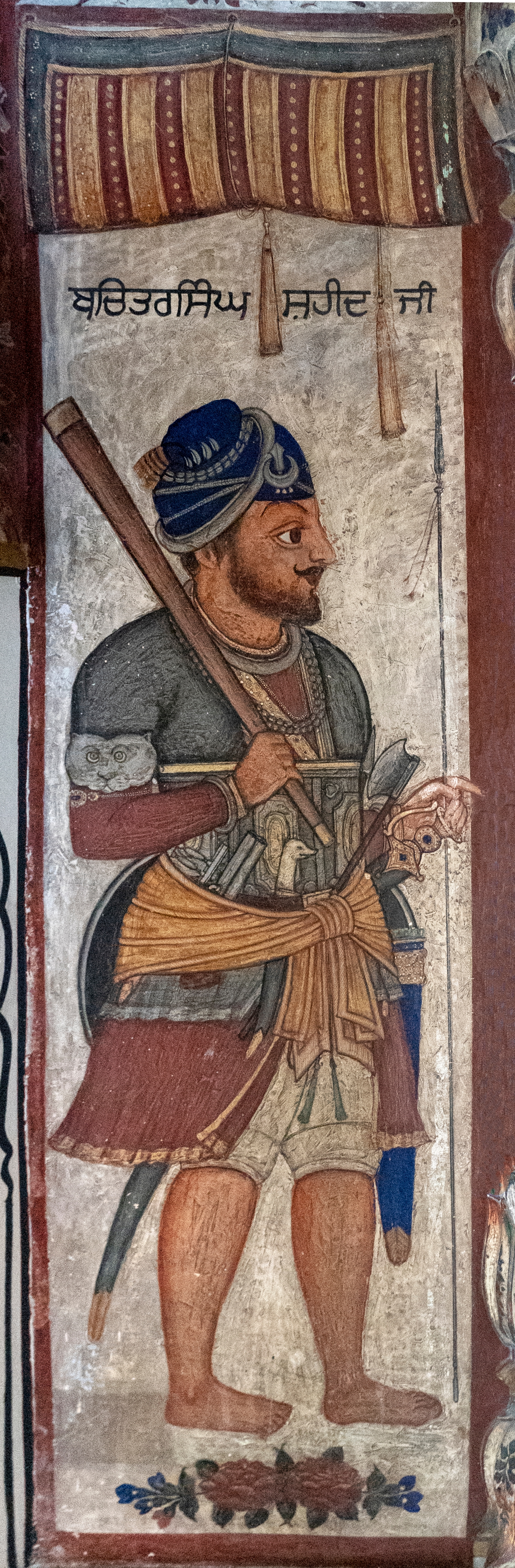
- Fresco depicting Bachittar Singh from Gurdwara Baba Atal, circa 19th century

Personal life
- Born: 6 May 1664
- Died: 22 December 1705 (aged 41)
- Cause of death: Died from injuries sustained in battle
- Parent: Bhai Mani Singh (father)
- Relations: Uday Singh (brother)

Religious life
- Religion: Sikhism

Military service
- Allegiance: Khalsa Fauj

Bhai Bachittar Singh (6 May 1664 – 22 December 1705), often known with the honorific "Shaheed" (martyr), was a Sikh hero and a general of Guru Gobind Singh. His father was Bhai Mani Singh and he came from Alipur Riyasat Multan.

== Biography ==
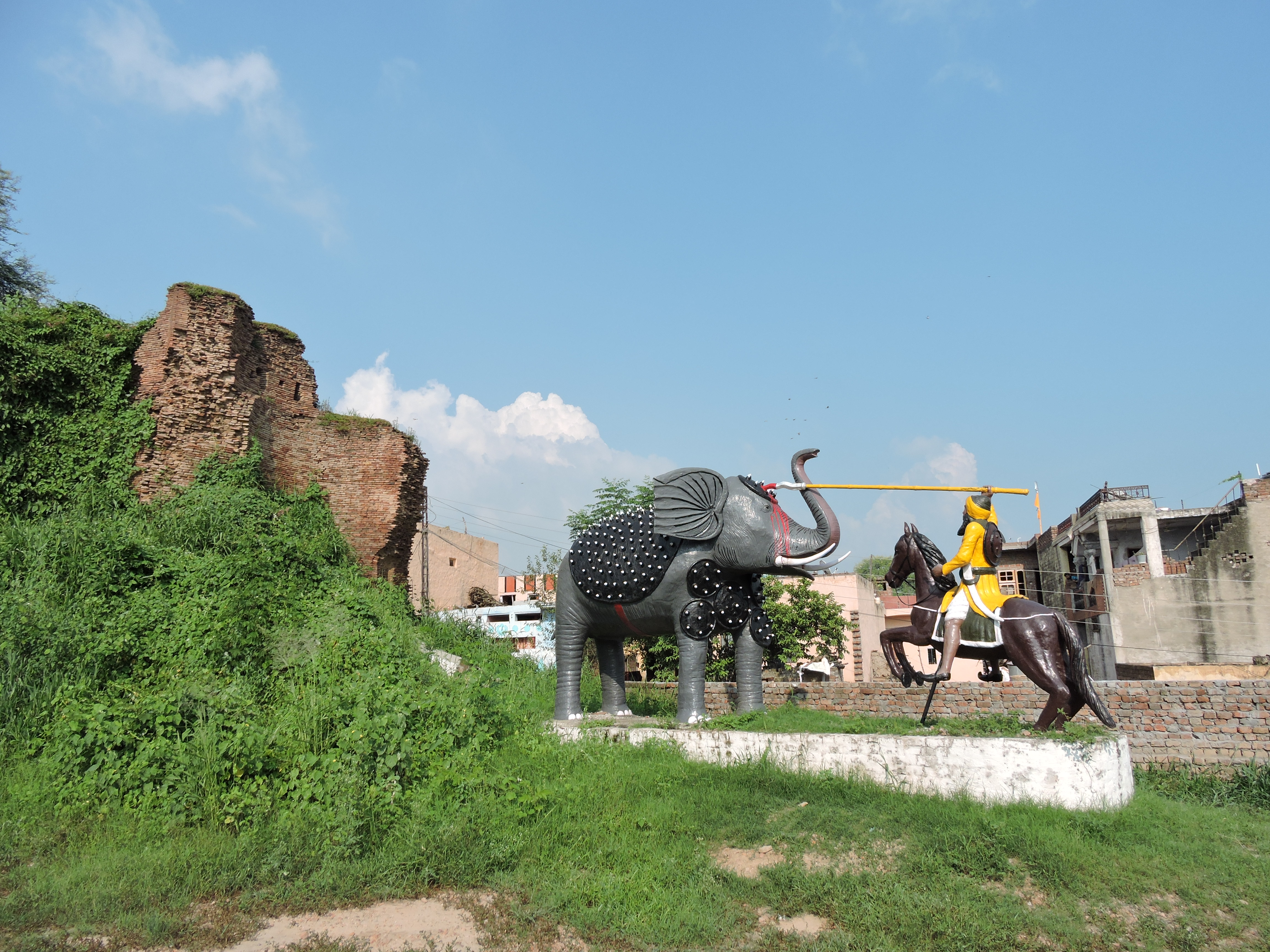
Fort of Kotla Nihang Khan, village Kotla Nihang Khan, Rupnagar district, Punjab, India

Bhai Bachittar Singh was the son of Bhai Mani Singh. He made a name for himself when he single-handedly defeated a drunken elephant let loose by the Army of the Mughal Empire during the siege of Lohgarh.

=== Death ===
An account cited that after Singh fought on the bank of a stream called Sarsa, where all of his companions perished, he was wounded during an encounter with the Mughal army on his way to Ropar. Bachittar Singh's wounds proved to be fatal. He succumbed to his injuries and died on 8 December 1705. Nihang Khan had the cremation performed secretly the following night.

== See also ==
- Nihang Khan
- Kotla Nihang Khan Fort
- Sikh Ajaibghar
