= Religious perspectives on tattooing =

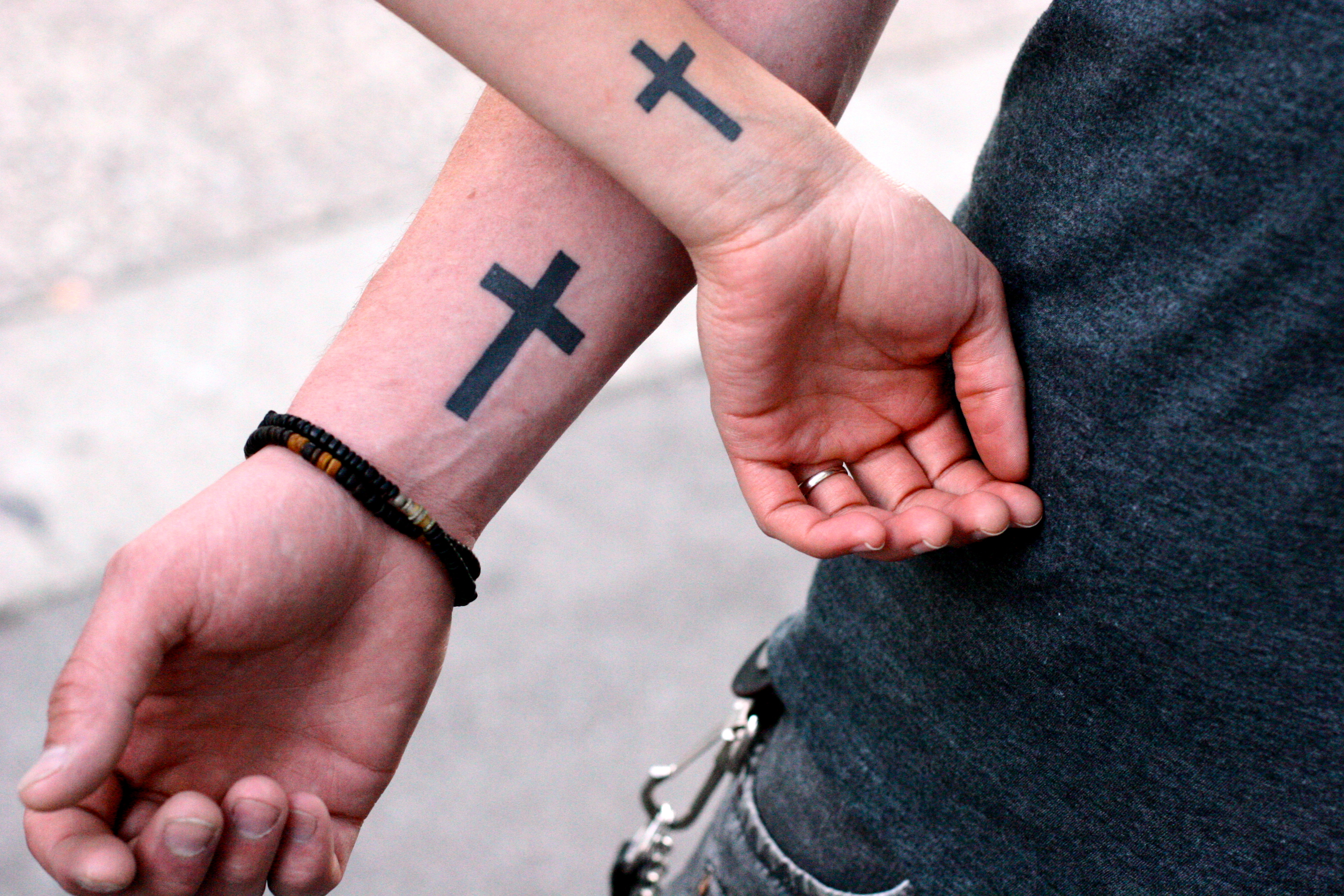
A Christian couple with cross symbol tattoos

Tattoos hold rich historical and cultural significance as permanent markings on the body, conveying personal, social, and spiritual meanings. However, religious interpretations of tattooing vary widely, from acceptance and endorsement to strict prohibitions associating it with the desecration of the sacred body.

In Christianity, opinions range from discouragement based on the sanctity of the body as a temple, to acceptance. Judaism traditionally prohibits tattooing as self-mutilation, but some modern practices have become more lenient. Islam generally discourages tattoos as altering the natural state of the body, though there are differing opinions among scholars. In Hinduism acceptance varies between sects and communities. Buddhism also has a varied perspective on tattooing, with a tradition of protective tattoos in Southeast Asia incorporating Buddhist symbols, but the display of tattoos not adhering to traditional norms can be a cause of controversy.

== Buddhism ==
Southeast Asia has a tradition of protective tattoos known as sak yant or yantra tattoos that incorporate Buddhist symbols and images, as well as protective mantras or sutra verses in antique Khmer script. These tattoos are sometimes applied by Buddhist monks or practitioners of indigenous spiritual traditions. Traditionally, tattoos that included images of the Buddha or other religious figures were only applied to certain parts of the body, and sometimes required commitment on the part of the recipient to observe the Five Precepts or other traditional customs. Incorporation of images of the Buddha into tattoos that do not comply with traditional norms for respectful display have been a cause of controversy in a number of traditional Buddhist countries, where the display of images of this type by Westerners may be regarded as appropriation and has resulted in barred entry or deportation of individuals displaying tattoos of this type.

== Christianity ==
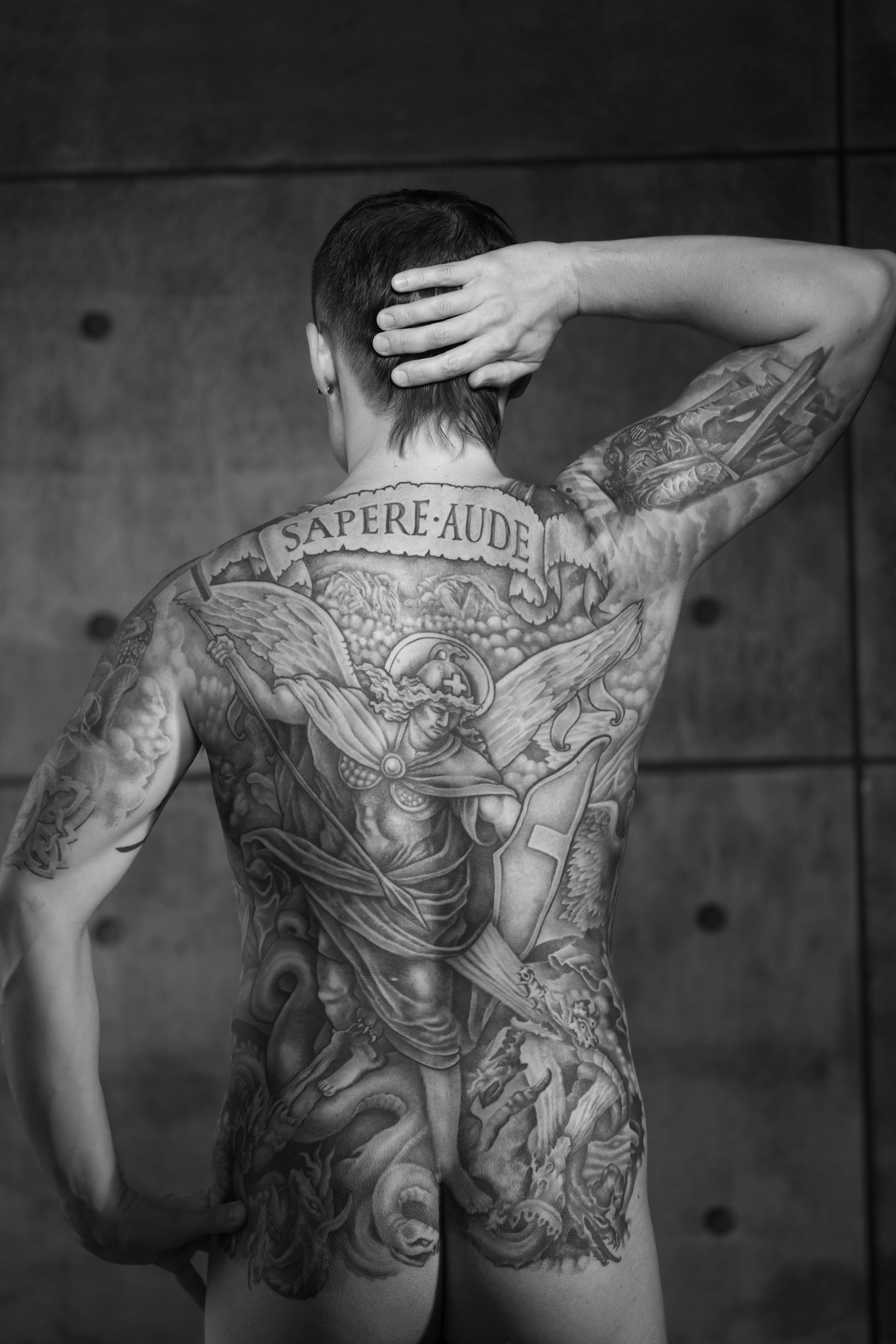
Man with a full back tattoo of Michael and the Dragon adapted from the bible engravings by Julius Schnorr von Carolsfeld

Some Christians take issue with tattooing, upholding the Hebrew prohibition. The Hebrew prohibition is based on interpreting Leviticus 19:28—"Ye shall not make any cuttings in your flesh for the dead, nor print any marks upon you"—so as to prohibit tattoos.

Interpretations of the passage vary, however. Some believe that it refers specifically to, and exclusively prohibits, an ancient form of self-mutilation during mourning (as discussed in the Judaism section). Under this interpretation, tattooing is permitted to Jews and Christians. Another interpretation is that it refers only to the tattooing of ink with ashes of deceased family.

Others hold that the prohibition of Leviticus 19:28, regardless of its interpretation, is not binding upon Christians—just as prohibitions like "nor shall there come upon you a garment of cloth made of two kinds of stuff" (Leviticus 19:19) are not binding—because it is part of the Jewish ceremonial law, binding only upon the Jewish people (see New Covenant § Christian view).

=== Latin Catholicism ===
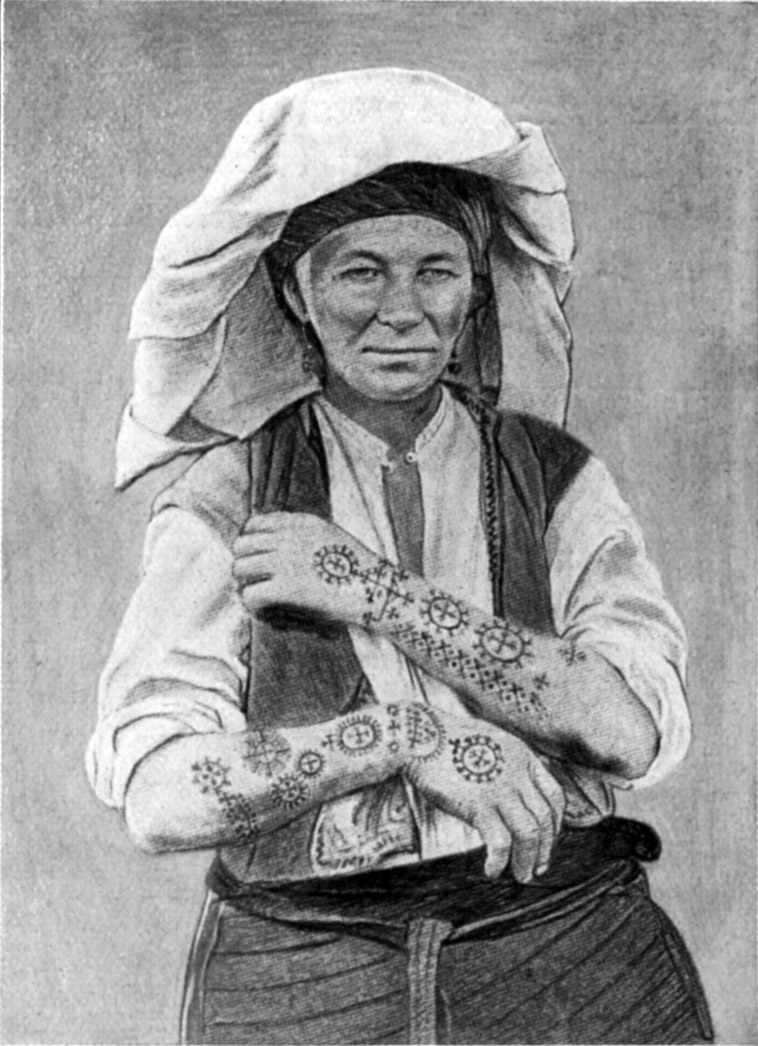
A Catholic woman in Bosnia displaying numerous tattooed crosses (19th century)

Catholic Croats of Bosnia and Herzegovina utilised tattooing of crosses for perceived protection against forced conversion to Islam and enslavement during the Ottoman occupation of Bosnia and Herzegovina. This form of tattooing continued long past its original motivation. Tattooing was performed during springtime or during special religious celebrations such as the Feast of St. Joseph, and consisted mostly of Christian crosses on hands, fingers, forearms, and around the neck and on the chest. The Eastern Orthodox population abhorred this practice.

=== Oriental Christianity ===
In Coptic Christianity, tattooing is often done to identify oneself as a Christian. During the reign of Pope Alexander II of Alexandria, monks had brands on their hand listing their monastery. The specific Coptic practice of tattooing a cross on the inside of the right wrist may have originated from Ethiopian practice, and served as a method of ethnic and religious identification in primarily Muslim society. It was seen as a reminder of one's faith and a way of making it impossible to apostatize. Tattoos marking people as Christians were also at times given punitively during times of persecution.

=== The Church of Jesus Christ of Latter-day Saints ===
Leaders of The Church of Jesus Christ of Latter-day Saints, most notably the late church president Gordon B. Hinckley in 2000 and 2007, have discouraged church members from getting tattoos. Latter-day Saints view bodies as a sacred gift from God, a metaphorical and literal temple to house the Spirit, as written in 1 Corinthians 3:16–17 and 1 Corinthians 6:19–20. Tattoos are often compared to graffiti on a temple. Apostle David A. Bednar said "the very thought of finding such inappropriate markings on a temple is offensive to all of us." Tattoos and multiple body piercings are also considered to be part of a worldly fad of shallow individuality, and church members are cautioned to not "pay ovations to the god of style."

While past editions of written behavioural guidelines, including the 2011 'For the Strength of Youth' pamphlet and the early 2022 'Gospel Topics' essays, contained explicit rules against tattooing, recent editions have instead contained broader directives to "honour the sacredness of your body" and "respect [your body] as [you] would a temple." However, the counsel of past leaders generally continues to apply today.

There are no consequences prescribed for church members who get tattoos; any discipline is up to the discretion of the member's bishop. However, those with tattoos who wish to serve as a proselytising missionary must have their applications reviewed on a case-by-case basis. For those who convert to Mormonism, the church states that "previously existing tattoos will not prevent one from serving in the Church and receiving all of God's blessings."

Any member with a tattoo is encouraged to personally consider its removal, because on one hand "if you have a tattoo, you wear a constant reminder of a mistake you have made," and on the other hand "church members believe God loves all of His children, regardless of what they look like."

In popular culture, motivational speaker Al Carraway gained celebrity for her 2015 book "More than the Tattooed Mormon", which discusses her struggle to fit in with fellow church members as a convert with many visible tattoos.

== Hinduism ==
Tattoos are not allowed culturally and religiously; contemporary tattoos are rare among traditional Hindus. Historical roots date back to the practice of Mehndi using henna (but Mehndi is different from tattoo as it is not permanent as tattoo).

== Islam ==
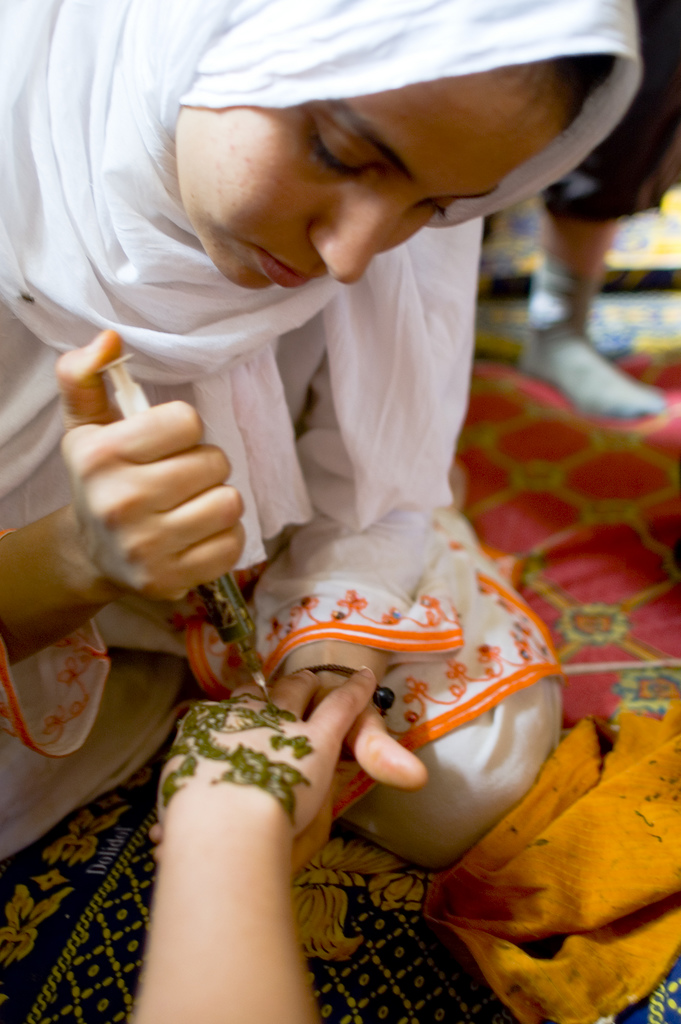
Woman applying a henna temporary tattoo (coloring hands) in Morocco

There is no direct mention of tattooing in the Qur'an. Scholars who claim that tattooing is a sin support their view by pointing to hadiths such as one in Sahih al-Bukhari narrated by Abu Juhayfa that purports "The Prophet cursed the one who does tattoos and the one who has a tattoo done." These scholars generally do not hold the view that non-permanent tattoos such as henna are sinful; nor do they claim that converts to Islam who had tattoos prior to conversion need to get those tattoos removed. Turkish professor of religious studies Remzi Kuscular states that tattoos are sinful but that they do not violate a Muslim's wuḍūʾ. Canadian Islamic scholar Ahmad Kutty claims that tattooing prohibitions exist in Islam to protect Muslims from HIV/AIDS, hepatitis, and other diseases that can be possibly transferred to people through tattooing.

According to the Islamic Medicine Academy, natural non-permanent (such as henna) tattoos are permitted in Islam while permanent or semi-permanent tattoos are forbidden and Mohammed encouraged females to use color on their hands (by using natural medium such as henna) while males can only use henna on their hair.

=== History ===
Göran Larsson, a Swedish professor in religious studies, states that there are "both historical and contemporary examples indicating that, at different times and in different places, [tattooing] was practiced by certain Islamic groups." Al-Tabari mentions in History of the Prophets and Kings that the hands of Asma bint Umais were tattooed. Muslims in Africa, Syria, Saudi Arabia, Iran and Pakistan have used tattoos for beautification, prophylaxis, and the prevention of diseases.

Edward William Lane described the tattooing customs of Egyptian Muslim women in his 1836 book, An Account of the Manners and Customs of the Modern Egyptians. In a 1909 trip to Persia, Percy Sykes observed Shia Muslim women had "birds, owers, or gazelles tattooed, but occasionally verses from the Qur'an" and that victorious male wrestlers and gymnasts were honored with the tattooing of a lion on the arm. In a 1965 article published in the journal Man: A Record of Anthropological Science, author John Carswell documented that Sunni and Shia Muslims in Lebanon would get tattoos of the swords of Abu Bakr and Ali, respectively, to distinguish themselves from one another.

According to historians Shoshana-Rose Marzel and Guy Stiebel, face tattoos were common among Muslim women until the 1950s but have since fallen out of fashion. Traditional Tunisian tattoos include eagles, the sun, the moon, and stars. Tattoos were also used in the Ottoman Empire due to the influx of Algerian sailors in the 17th century. Bedouin and Kurdish women have a long tradition of tattooed bodies.

Margo DeMello, a cultural anthropologist and professor at Canisius College, notes that tattoos are still common in some parts of the Muslim world such as Iraq, Afghanistan, Morocco, Algeria, and Egypt. Underground tattoos have also been gaining popularity among Iranian youth. Some Turkish youth get tattoos as a form of resistance, fashion, or as part of a counterculture. Tattoos are also gaining popularity among young Muslims in the West.

Some Muslims believe that tattooing is a sin because it involves changing the natural creation of God, inflicting unnecessary pain in the process. Tattoos are classified as dirty things, which is prohibited in Islam. They believe that a dirty body will directly lead to a dirty mind and will destroy their wudhu, ritual ablution. Some Shafi'i scholars such as Amjad Rasheed argue that tattooing causes impurity and that tattoos were prohibited by the Prophet Muhammad. They also claim that those who are decorated with tattoos are contaminated with najis, due to potential mixture of blood and coloured pigment that remains upon the surface of the skin. Blood is viewed as an impure substance, so a person with a tattoo cannot engage in several religious practices. However, in the present day, it is possible to get a tattoo without mixing dye with blood after it exits onto the outer surface of the body, leaving a possibility for a Muslim to wear a tattoo and perform a valid prayer. Scholar Yusuf al-Qaradawi states that tattoos are sinful because they are an expression of vanity and they alter the physical creation of God. According to the online South African Deobandi fatwa service called Ask-the-Imam, Muslims should remove any tattoos they have if possible or cover them in some way.

=== Shia Islam ===
Shia Ayatollahs Ali al-Sistani and Ali Khamenei believe there are no authoritative Islamic prohibitions on tattoos. The Quran does not mention tattoos or tattooing at all.

Grand Ayatollah Sadiq Hussaini Shirazi ruled: "Tattoos are considered makruh (reprehensible but not forbidden). However, it is not permissible to have Quranic verses, names of Ahlulbayt (a.s), drawings of Imams (a.s), Hadiths, unislamic and inappropriate images or the likes tattooed onto the body. And if the ink was the type that remains above the skin, then it would be considered prohibited. However, if it was of the type to go beneath the skin, it would be considered permissible but makruh."

== Judaism ==
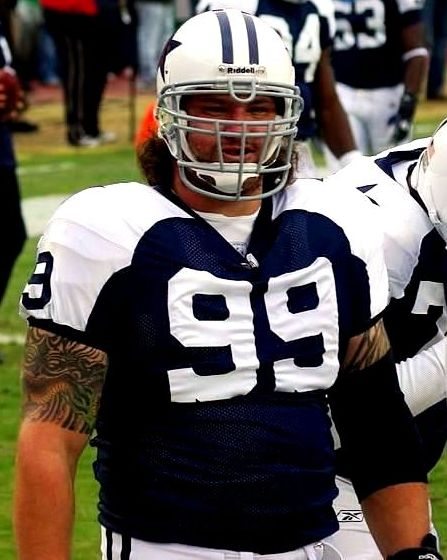
Jewish American NFL player Igor Olshansky has many tattoos, including two Stars of David on his neck. He is regularly featured in Jewish news publications.

Tattoos can be prohibited in Judaism based on the Torah (Leviticus 19:28): "You shall not make gashes in your flesh for the dead, or incise any marks on yourselves: I am the Lord." The prohibition is explained by contemporary rabbis as part of a general prohibition on body modification (with the exception of circumcision) that does not serve a medical purpose (such as to correct a deformity). Maimonides, a leading 12th-century scholar of Jewish law and thought, explains that one of the reasons for the prohibition against tattoos is a Jewish response to pagan mourning practices.

Scholars such as John Huehnergard and Harold Liebowitz suggest that the prohibition against tattooing was less in response to the pagan mourning practices as mentioned in the preceding verse of Leviticus, as death rituals in ancient Mesopotamia, Syria, Israel, and Egypt make no references to marking the skin as a sign of mourning. However tattooing was used a sign of enslavement and servitude in ancient Egypt, where captives were tattooed or branded with the names of priests and pharaohs to mark them as belonging to a specific person or god. Huehnergard and Liebowitz therefore suggest that tattooing was forbidden in the Torah because it was a symbol of servitude and the primacy of escaping Egyptian bondage in ancient Jewish theological law. They also point out the verse Isaiah 44:5 in which the children of Jacob committing themselves to God: "One shall say, 'I am the LORD's'... Another shall mark his arm 'of the LORD.'"

Orthodox Jews, in application of halakha (Jewish Law), reveal Leviticus 19:28 prohibits getting tattoos. One reading of Leviticus is to apply it only to the specific ancient practice of rubbing the ashes of the dead into wounds; but modern tattooing is included in other religious interpretations. Orthodox Jews also point to a passage from the Shulchan Aruch, Yoreh De'ah 180:1, that elucidates the biblical passage above as a prohibition against markings beyond the ancient practice, including tattoos. Maimonides concluded that regardless of intent, the act of tattooing is prohibited (Mishneh Torah, Laws of Idolatry 12:11).

Conservative Jews point to the next verse of the Shulchan Aruch (Yoreh De'ah 180:2): "If it [the tattoo] was done in the flesh of another, the one to whom it was done is blameless" – this is used by them to say that tattooing oneself is different from obtaining a tattoo, and that the latter may be acceptable.. Orthodox Jews disagree, and read the text as referring to forced tattooing—as was done during the Holocaust—which is not considered a violation of Jewish Law on the part of the victim. In another vein, cutting into the skin to perform surgery and temporary tattooing used for surgical purposes (e.g.: to mark the lines of an incision) are permitted in the Shulhan Arukh 180:3.

Reform Jewish leadership generally oppose tattooing, but are more permissive in their stance. The Central Conference of American Rabbis has issued a responsa on tattooing that describes it as "an act of hubris and manipulation that most surely runs counter to the letter and spirit of our tradition" and which dishonors the body. The responsa also states that the prohibition on tattoos is a general prohibition and not an absolute prohibition.

In modern times, the association of tattoos with Nazi concentration camps and the Holocaust has changed the discussion around tattoos in Judaism. It is made clear that any such tattoos do not fall under the scope of the prohibition, since it applies only to voluntary and permanent tattoos. For some, the Holocaust added another level of revulsion to tattooing. For others, this tragedy sparked a wave of many Jews getting tattooed with Auschwitz numbers as a form of remembrance and reclamation.

Additionally, it is a common misconception that anyone bearing a tattoo is not permitted to be buried in a Jewish cemetery. Even if a Rabbi considered a tattoo to be a violation of a prohibition it is still not grounds for refusing the right to burial or synagogue rituals simply because it is no more egregious that any other sin, it is only more visible. However, despite the allegation about Jewish people being barred from burial in a Jewish cemetery if they have tattoos being acknowledged in modern times to be an old myth, individual cemeteries and other organizations have in fact been entitled to make their own rules and standards for burial.

== Neopaganism ==
Neopagans can use the process and the outcome of tattooing as an expression or representation of their beliefs. Many tattooists' websites offer pagan images as examples of the kinds of provided artwork. At least one Wiccan tradition, Blue Star Wicca, uses a tattoo as a mark of initiation, although it is an entitlement, not a requirement.

== Sources ==
- Larsson, Göran (January 17, 2014). "Islam and tattooing: an old question, a new research topic". Religion and the Body. 23: 237–256. doi:10.30674/scripta.67390. ISSN 2343-4937.

== External sources ==
- Tattos of Tibetan ex-political prisoners Interview with Buddhist monk Palden Gyatso discussing tattoos for monks.
- A New Look at Judaism and Tattoos, Rabbi Menachem Levine, The Algemeiner
