= Vada =

Vada or Vayda may refer to:

== People ==
- Gunnar Vada (1927–2018), Norwegian politician
- Vada Nobles, American record producer
- Vada Pinson (1938–1995), American baseball player
- Vada Sultenfuss, fictional character in the 1991 film My Girl
- Valentín Vada (born 1996), Argentinian footballer

== Places ==
- Caput Vada, Tunisia
- Vada Agaram, came from Chennai, India
- Vada, Palghar, India
- Vada, Georgia, a community in the United States
- Vada, Missouri, a community in the United States
- Vada, Rosignano Marittimo, a town in Tuscany, Italy

== Other uses ==
- Vada (food), a fritter-type snack from south India
- Ulmus 'Wanoux', an elm cultivar marketed under the selling name Vada

== See also ==
- Vaada (disambiguation)
- Wada (disambiguation)
- Vara (disambiguation)
- Bara (disambiguation)
