= Vara =

Vara or VARA may refer to:

== Geography ==
- Vara (river), in Liguria, Italy
- Vara Parish, former municipality in Tartu County, Estonia
- Vara, Estonia, village in Peipsiääre Parish, Tartu County, Estonia
- Vara Municipality, municipality in western Sweden
  - Vara, Sweden, town in Sweden
- Batterie Vara, former German coastal fortress near Kristiansand, Norway, now Kristiansand Cannon Museum
- Las Varas (disambiguation), several places

== People with the surname ==
- Armando Vara (born 1954), Portuguese politician
- Julián Vara (born 1983), Spanish footballer
- Kathy Vara, American television anchor
- Shailesh Vara, British politician

== Films ==
- Vara (film), a 2013 Kannada film starring Nidhi Subbaiah
- Vara: A Blessing, a 2013 Bhutanese film by Khyentse Norbu

== Other uses ==
- Vara, a rarely used Spanish and Portuguese unit of length
  - Portuguese customary units
  - Spanish customary units
- Vara, a variety of the Central Banda language of the Central African Republic
- Vara, a variety of the Upper Morehead language of Papua New Guinea
- Vara, list of Greyhawk deities, a fictional deity in the Dungeons & Dragons roleplaying game
- A.S.D. Fo.Ce. Vara, former football club in Italy
- VARA HF, a proprietary WinLink protocol for e-mail communications over amateur radio
- Vāra (astronomy), a week-day in Indian calendrical systems

== Acronyms ==
- Omroepvereniging VARA, a public broadcasting organization in the Netherlands
- Visual Artists Rights Act, a law in the United States that protects artists' moral rights to attribution and the integrity of their work
- Virgin Australia Regional Airlines, is an Australian regional airline based in Perth Australia

== See also ==
- Vada (disambiguation)
- Bara (disambiguation)
- Varus deformity, as in "tibia vara"
- Vada (food), an Indian fried snack
- Varam (film), a 1993 Indian film
