= Dher Majra =

Coordinates: 31°02′N 76°37′E

Dher Majra is an archeological site associated with the Indus Valley civilization in Rupnagar district in the Indian state of Punjab. The settlement was believed to primarily belong to the Bara culture strand of the Indus Valley Civilization.

== See also ==
- Bara culture
