= Kotla Nihang Khan =

- Suburb
- Kotla Nihang
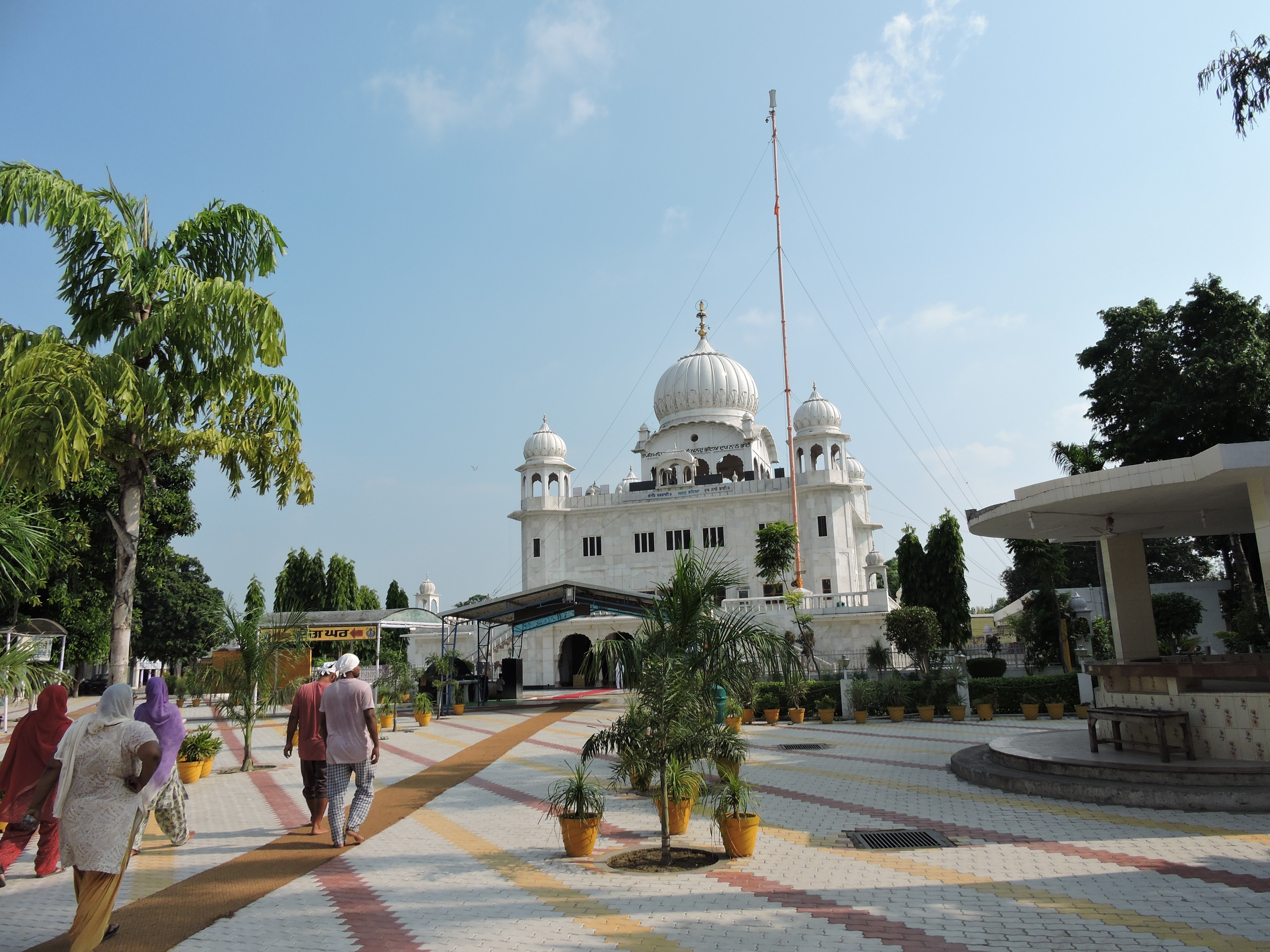
- Gurdwara Bhatha Sahib

- Location in Punjab, India Kotla Nihang Khan (India)
- Coordinates: 30°57′11″N 76°32′15″E
- Country: India
- City: Rupnagar
- State: Punjab
- District: Rupnagar

Languages
  - Official: Punjabi
- Time zone: UTC+5:30 (IST)
- Website: rupnagar.nic.in

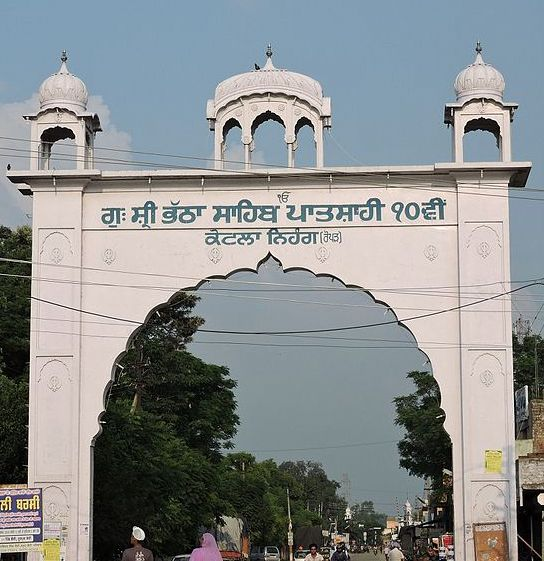
Gurudwara Bhatha Sahib, Kotla Nihang Khan, Rupnagar, Punjab, India

Kotla Nihang Khan is a suburb town of Ropar city in Punjab, India. It is famed as the erstwhile principality of the seventeenth-century Pathan zamindar ruler, Nihang Khan, who was an associate of the tenth Sikh Guru, Guru Gobind Singh.

== Indus Valley Civilization Site ==
Kotla Nihang Khan is also a major archeological site associated with the Bronze Age Indus Valley civilization, dating to the 3300-1300 BCE period. Several underground structures, including a furnace dating to the Bronze Age, were unearthed here. Kotla Nihang Khan's initial settlement has been dated to 2200 BCE based on analysis of excavated artifacts. The excavated area here shows two distinct sectors: an eastern sector where pottery remains are indicative of Urban Harappan Culture, and a western sector where Urban Harappan artifacts are found mixed with Bara Ware. This is believed to indicate coexistence or a transition between the original Harappan inhabitants and the later Baran settlers at the settlement.

== Gurdwara Bhatha Sahib ==
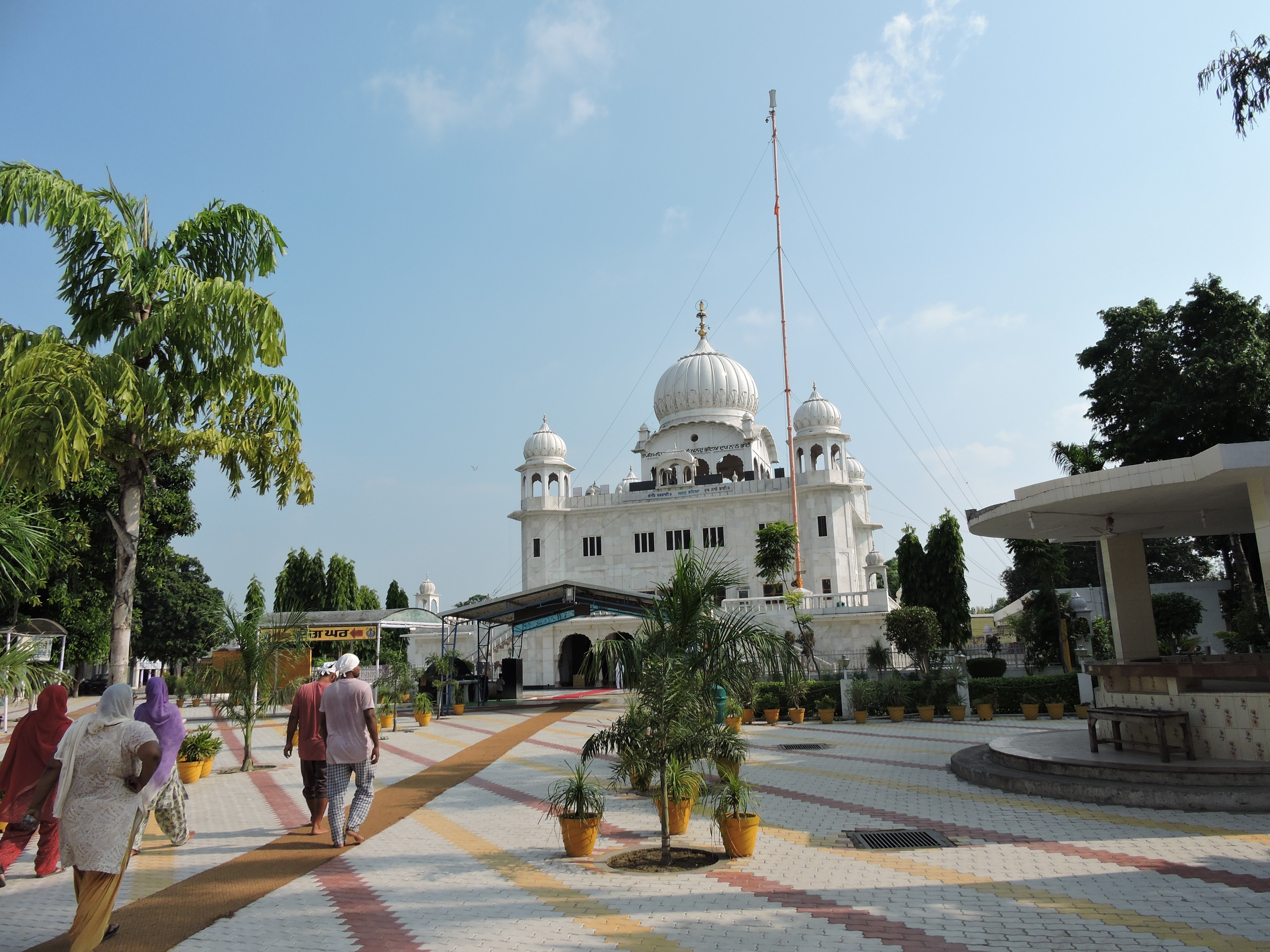
Gurudwara Bhatha Sahib, Kotla Nihang, Roopnagar, Punjab, India

This place is famous for a historical Gurdwara Bhatha Sahib. Guru Gobind Singh, the tenth Guru of the Sikhs, visited this place in 1688 during their return from Anandpur Sahib and stayed there where there was a brick kilan known as a Bhatha in vernacular Punjabi language. Later, the Gurdwara was built in memory of the visit of the Guru which came to be known as Bhatha Sahib.

== Kotla Nihang Khan Fort ==
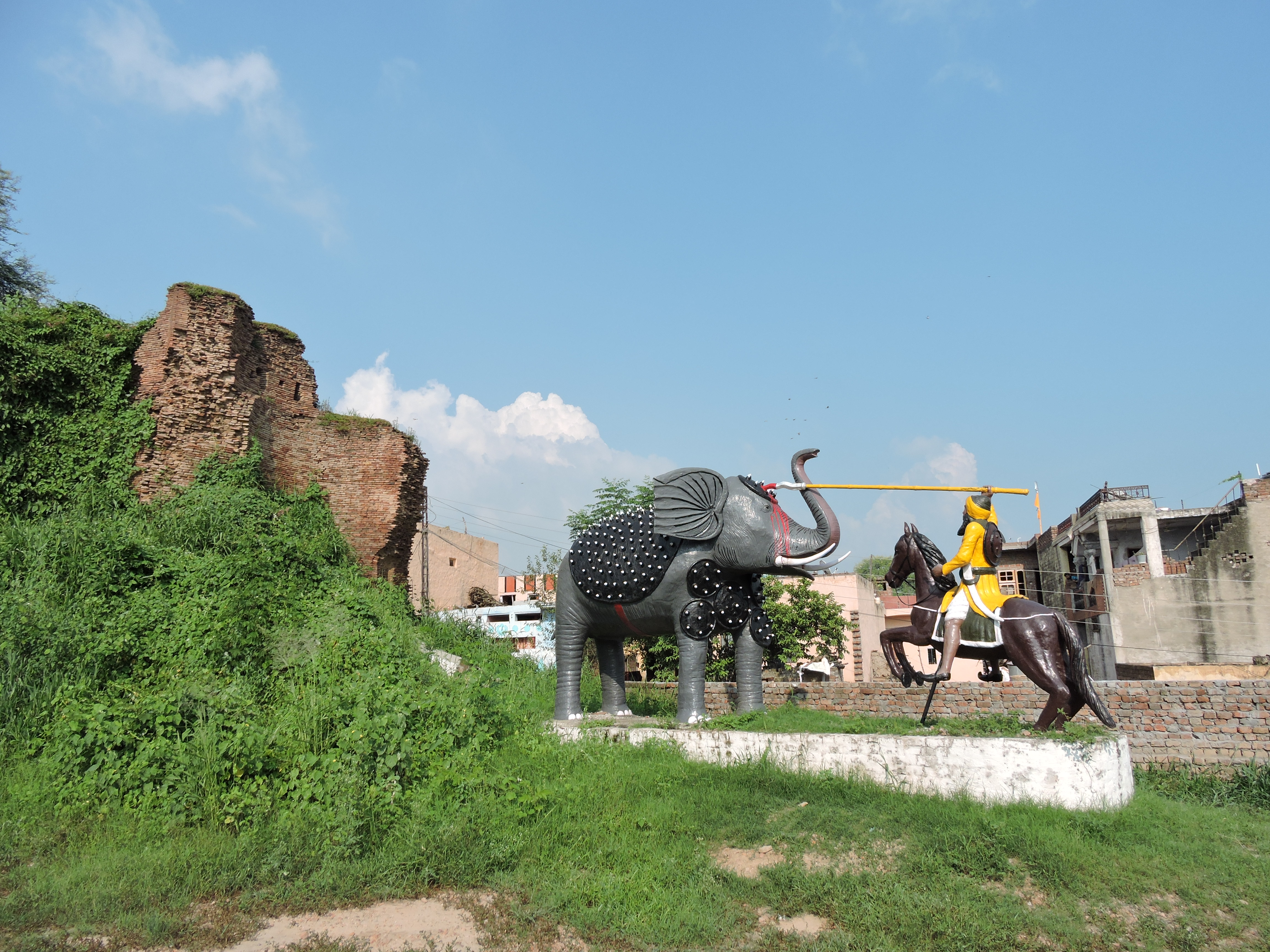
Fort of Kotla Nihang Khan, village Kotla Nihang Khan, Rupnagar district, Punjab, India.

There is a fort in the village known as Kotla Nihang Khan Fort which was built by the then Afghan Zimindar ruler Nihang Khan who ruled over 80 villages in the 17 Century.

== See also ==
- Nihang Khan
- Bara, Punjab
- Bara culture
- Kotla Nihang Khan Fort

== Bibliography ==
- Excavation sites in Punjab Archaeological Survey of India
