= Vaada =

Vaada may refer to:

- Vaada (2005 film), a 2005 Indian film
- Vaada, the Zionist Aid and Rescue Committee active in Hungary during the Holocaust
- Vaada (2010 film), 2010 Indian Tamil-language film

== See also ==
- Vada (disambiguation)
- Wada (disambiguation)
