= Yotsugoya Station =

Railway station in Akita, Akita Prefecture, Japan

Yotsugoya Station 四ツ小屋駅
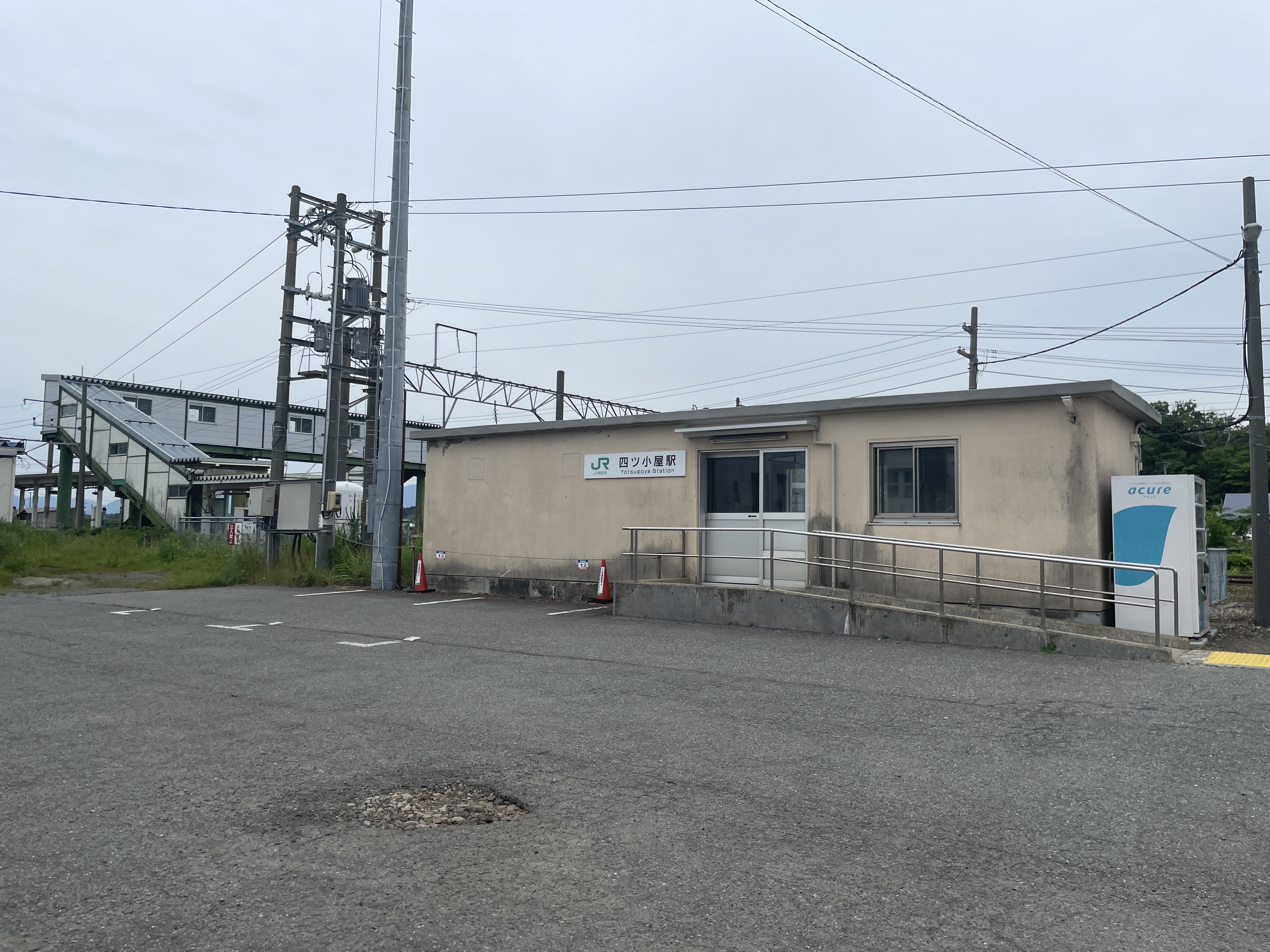
- Yotsugoya Station in June 2023

General information
- Location: Yanagibayashi-49 Yotsugoyakoaji, Akita-shi, Akita-ken 010-1418; Japan
- Coordinates: 39°39′38.8″N 140°8′41.3″E
- Operator: JR East
- Line: Ōu Main Line
- Distance: 292.3 kilometers from Fukushima
- Platforms: 1 island platform

Other information
- Status: Unstaffed
- Website: Official website

History
- Opened: 16 August 1917; 109 years ago

Services
Preceding station	JR East	Following station
Wada One-way operation	Ōu Main Line Rapid	Akita towards Aomori
Wada towards Shinjō	Ōu Main Line Local	Akita towards Aomori
Location
- Location within Akita Prefecture Location within Japan

Yotsugoya Station (四ツ小屋駅, Yotsugoya-eki) is a railway station in the city of Akita, Akita Prefecture, Japan, operated by East Japan Railway Company (JR East).

== Lines ==
Yotsugoya Station is served by the Ōu Main Line, and is located 292.3 km from the starting point of the line at Fukushima Station.

== Station layout ==
The station has a single island platform, connected to the station building by a footbridge. The station is unattended. Akita Shinkansen trains run through this station, using the tracks adjacent to Platform 1.

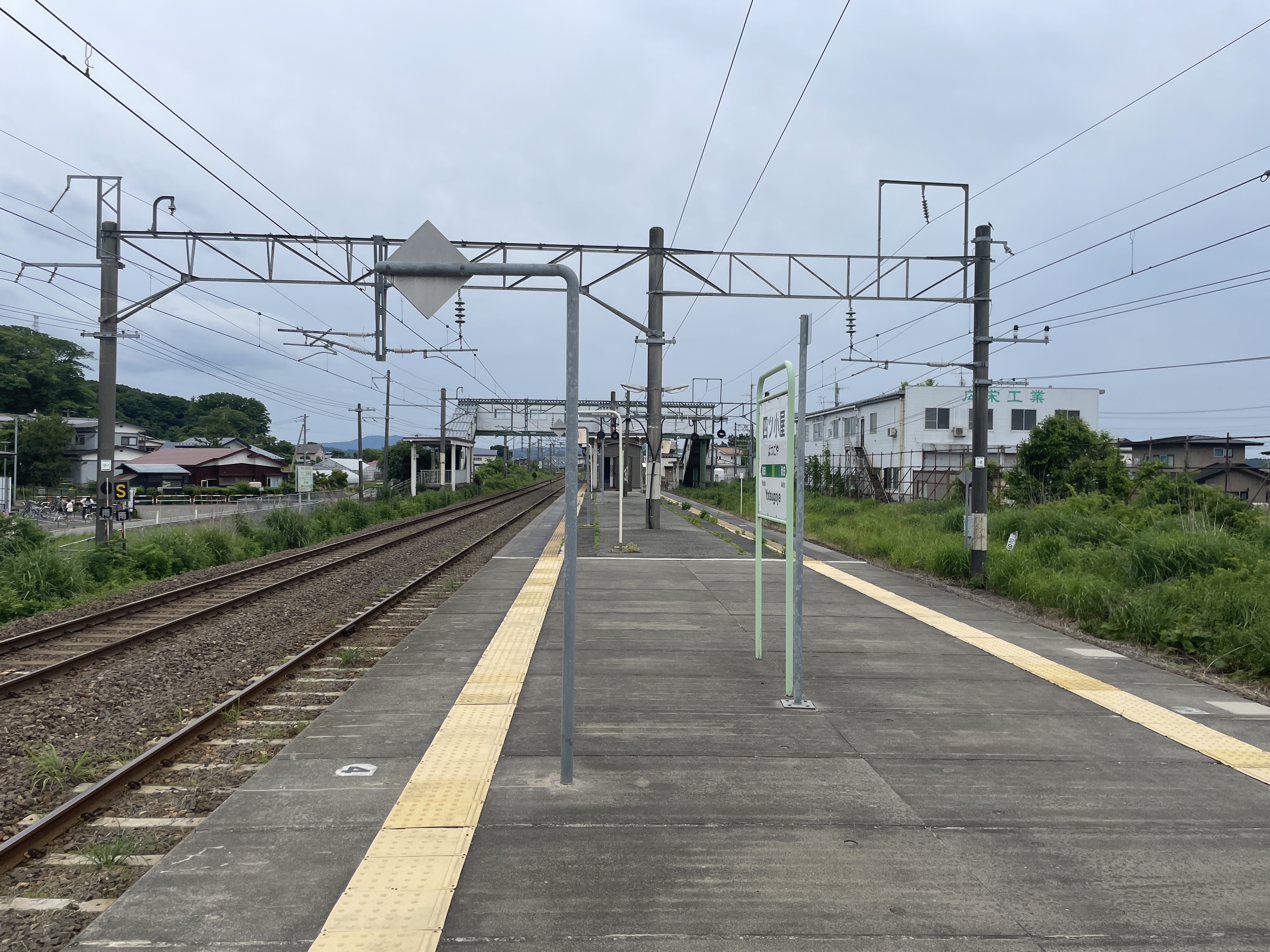
Platform in June, 2023

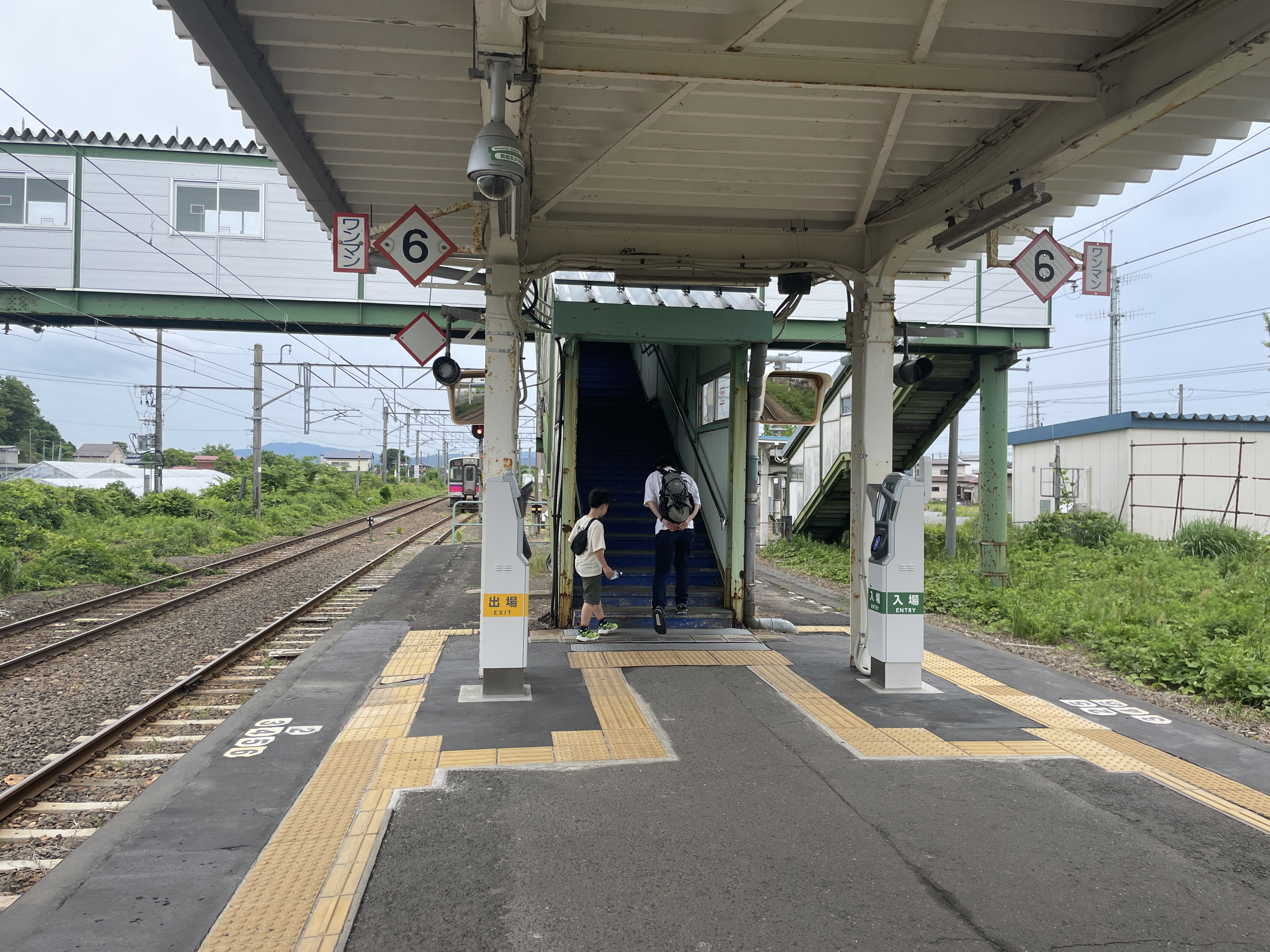
Gates in June, 2023

=== Platforms ===
1	■ Ōu Main Line	for Akita
2	■ Ōu Main Line	for Ōmagari and Yuzawa

== History ==
Yotsugoya Station was opened on 16 August 1917 as a station on the Japanese Government Railways (JGR). JGR became the Japanese National Railways (JNR) after World War II. The station was absorbed into the JR East network upon the privatization of JNR on 1 April 1987. A new station building was completed in 2004.

== Surrounding area ==
- National Route 13

== See also ==
- List of railway stations in Japan
