= Las Varas =

Las Varas (Spanish "the rods") may refer to:

- Las Varas, Argentina, San Justo Department, Córdoba, Argentina
- Las Varas, Madera Municipality, Mexico
- Las Varas, Nayarit, Mexico
- Las Varas, Saucillo Municipality, Mexico

== See also ==
- Vara (disambiguation)
