= Bara, Punjab =

Bara, Punjab ਬਾੜਾ, ਪੰਜਾਬ
- Village
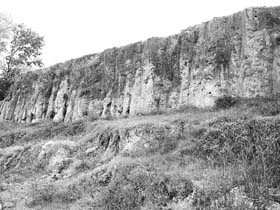
- A view of an archeological site

- Location in Punjab, India Bara, Punjab (India)
- Coordinates: 30.9167°N 76.5208°E
- Country: India
- State: Punjab
- District: Rupnagar
- Established: 19th Century (2000 BCE)

Government
  - Type: Sarpanch - Village Panchayat
  - Body: Village Panchayat

Area
  - Total: 0.94 km^{2} (0.36 sq mi)
  - Rank: 175
- Elevation: 277 m (909 ft)

Population
  - Total: 512
  - Density: 540/km^{2} (1,400/sq mi)

Languages
  - Official: Punjabi
- Time zone: UTC+5:30 (IST)
- Postal code: 140108
- Telephone Code: +91-1881
- Vehicle registration: PB 12 & PB 71
- Nearest Cities: Rupnagar, Chamkaur Sahib, Morinda
- Lok Sabha Constituency: Anandpur Sahib (Sl. Number : 49)
- Vidhan Sabha Constituency: Chamkaur Sahib (Sl. Number : 51)
- Civic Agency: Village Panchayat
- Climate: Extreme hot in summers Extreme cold in winters (Köppen)
- Census Village Number Codes: Village Code : 038691 Panchayat Code : 100

Bara is a village in Rupnagar District in Punjab, India. The village has mainly two Jatt Sikh surnames Chakkal and Heer and lies on the Rupnagar-Morinda Road at the left bank of a seasonal monsoon rivulet called Budki Nadi, about four kilometers south-west of the city Ropar and 40 km (25 mi) northeast of Chandigarh on National Highway 205 (India) (NH-205). Bara is the site of significant archeological excavations connected with the Indus Valley civilization. It has some evidence of being home to a culture (sometimes called Baran Culture) that was a pre-Harappan strand of the Indus Valley Civilization. Baran and Harappan cultures may have intertwined and coexisted in some places, such as Kotla Nihang Khan, also in modern-day Punjab.

== See also ==
- Kotla Nihang Khan
- Bara culture or Baran Culture
- Siswal
- Chamkaur Sahib
- Chandigarh - Tri-city
- Kurali
- Mohali

== Bibliography ==
- Excavation sites in Punjab Archaeological Survey of India
