= Abu Juhayfa =

Companion of Muhammad and Ali

Wahb ibn ʿAbd Allāh ibn Maslama (Arabic: وهب بن عبد الله بن مَسْلمة), known as Abu Juhayfa (ابو جحیفة), was one of the companions of Muhammad and Ali. He was from the tribe of Bani Suwa'a ibn Amir ibn Sa'sa'a. He was still a young boy when Muhammad passed away. During the caliphate of Ali, he was appointed as the head of the city's guards and Bayt al-Mal and Ali gave him the epithet "Wahb al-Khair". He was present in the Battle of Nahrawan in Ali's army and went to Al-Mada'in with him. He has narrated hadiths about the call to prayer, the direction of the Qiblah, and the proof of the Twelver Imamate.

After the death of the senior companions of Muhammad in Kufa, he was one of the authorities on Fiqh and Hadith. His hadiths are mentioned in Sunni books. He heard and narrated hadith from Ali and Al-Bara' ibn Azib. He died during the rule of Bishr ibn Marwan in Iraq and was the last of the companions of Muhammad who died in Kufa.
