= Céline Bara =

French pornographic actress (born 1978)

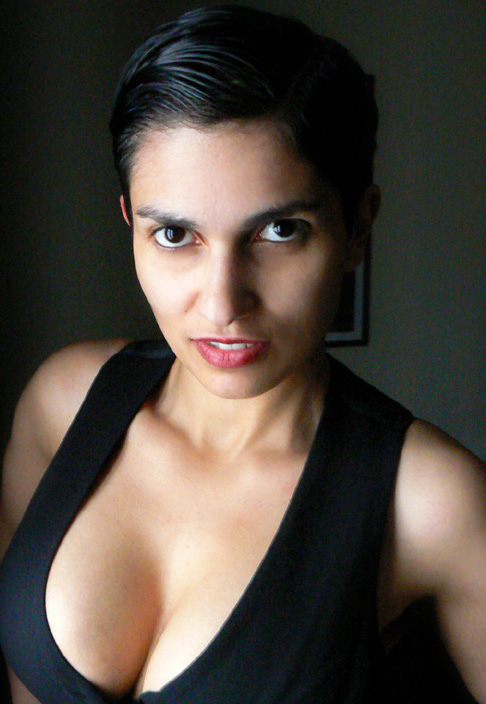
- Bara in 1998
- Born: 9 September 1978 (age 47); Antony, France
- Height: 168 cm (66 in)
- Spouse: Cyrille Bara
- Website: www.celinebara.com

Céline Bara, née Céline Szumigay, (9 September 1978) is a French retired pornographic film actress.

== Biography ==
Céline Bara was born in Antony and grew up in the Parisian region. Her mother is of Mauritian origin and she also has a German grandfather. According to her own account, she received a Catholic fundamentalist education. She later rejected this upbringing and became a militant atheist. She married her cousin Cyrille Bara and worked for a time as a hostess in a Darty store, then started performing in pornographic films after finding out that she could make more money in this line of work. In 2000, she was nominated for the Hot d'Or for Best New French Starlet.

She performed for several French porn companies, but she and her husband eventually created their own studio, with Cyrille Bara directing the films. However, their small company was soon heavily in debt.

In March 2001, Céline and Cyrille Bara assaulted one of their colleagues and competitors, porn actor-director HPG, whom Cyrille Bara wounded with a shotgun. Both spouses were arrested a few days later and, in October 2002, sentenced to four years imprisonment, including two years of probation.

After their release, the Baras, unemployed and heavily indebted, lived from welfare benefits. They eventually settled in Ariège, where Céline Bara found occasional work as a stripper. They eventually started shooting new pornographic videos, which they distributed for free on their website. Céline Bara published in 2007 an autobiographical book, La Sodomite, co-authored with her husband. In 2011, she was portrayed by her husband in a hentai-style comic featuring BDSM themes.

In 2012, after applying unsuccessfully to the French Communist Party and the New Anticapitalist Party for candidacy in the legislative elections, Céline Bara and her husband created their own political party, a far left group called the Antitheist and Libertine Movement, of which themselves and a friend were the only three members. She then ran for parliament in Ariège on an "anti-capitalist" and "anti-religious" platform, presenting herself as a communist and "neo-stalinist" candidate. Her husband was also her running mate. Her candidacy attracted the French media's attention, thanks also to a program which included banning all religions, defending LGBT rights, legalizing drugs and sterilizing disabled people at birth. She eventually received 1.58% of the votes in Ariège.

In September 2012, Céline Bara announced that she was putting an end to her career as a porn performer.

On 8 February 2013 she was declared ineligible for a period of three years by the Constitutional Council of France for not having deposited her campaign returns.

== Autobiography ==
- 2007 : La Sodomite, co-authored with Cyrille Bara (ISBN 978-2-9530330-0-7)
