= Bara, Nigeria =

Bara
- Bara shown within Nigeria
- Coordinates: 8°2′N 4°20′E
- Country: Nigeria
- State: Oyo State
- LGA: Surulere
- Elevation: 359 m (1,178 ft)
- Time zone: UTC+1 (WAT)
- Terrain: hilly
- Climate: Aw

Bara is a town in Oyo State of southwestern Nigeria. It is located just west of the Oko-Iressa-Aadu Road. The majority of the people are members of the Yoruba ethnic group. Most of the people are employed in agriculture with locally produced yams, cassava, maize, and tobacco.
