= Bara culture =

Culture of the Indus Valley Civilization

Bara Culture was a culture that emerged in the eastern region of the Indus Valley civilization around 2000 BCE. It developed in the doab between the Yamuna and Sutlej rivers, hemmed on its eastern periphery by the Shivalik ranges of the lower Himalayas. This territory corresponds to modern-day Punjab, Haryana and Western Uttar Pradesh in North India. Older publications regard the Baran pottery to have initially developed independently of the Harappan culture branch of the Indus Valley Civilization from a pre-Harappan tradition, although the two cultures later intermingled in locations such as Kotla Nihang Khan and Bara, Punjab. According to Akinori Uesugi and Vivek Dangi, Bara pottery is a stylistic development of Late Harappan pottery. In the conventional timeline demarcations of the Indus Valley Tradition, the Bara culture is usually placed in the Late Harappan period.

Bara culture is so-named because initial evidence for its existence was discovered from archeological digs at the site in Bara, Punjab. Dher Majra and Sanghol are other important Bara culture sites that have been excavated.

== Bara pottery ==
Bara culture is based on the Pottery found here, it is classified as a separate archaeological culture and subculture. Older publications regard the Baran culture to have initially developed independently of the Harappan culture branch of the Indus Valley Civilization from a pre-Harappan tradition, although the two cultures later intermingled in locations such as Kotla Nihang Khan and Bara, Punjab.

Pottery remnants of the Bara culture reveal a style that is consistently differentiable from that of the Harappan culture, though there are some shared features as well. Specific forms quintessentially associated with the Harappans, such as "perforated jar, S-shaped jar, tall dish-on-stand with drum, goblet, beaker and handled-cup" are absent. Instead, other forms unique to the Barans are found, including jars and vessels "incised on shoulder and rusticated at the bottom", jars with bulbous bodies, long necks and flaring rims, and collared-rim jars.

Harappan dishes-on-stand (i.e. dishes with a stand beneath) have long and slender necks, whereas Baran dishes-on-stand have short and thick ones. Harappan wares tend to be plain, while Baran ware is usually embellished with painted patterns (such as brush-made spirals) and decorative incisions, often on the interior side of vessels and jars.

According to Akinori Uesugi and Vivek Dangi, Bara pottery is a stylistic development of Late Harappan pottery.

== Possible role in propagating citrus cultivation ==
Lemon seeds were found at the excavations at the Baran settlement at Sanghol, which remains the only evidence for citrus cultivation this far west at that time. Citrus is thought to have been domesticated first in a region centered on Northeastern India, South China and the northern regions of Southeast Asia, and diffused outwards from there. The finding at Sanghol suggests that westward diffusion may have occurred along the Ganges Valley where the Barans may have gained knowledge of citrus cultivation in the early second millennium BCE period and then contributed to westwards propagation. Citrus cultivation is believed to have arrived in Southwest Asia in the 1200 BCE period and lemons more specifically in the first millennium CE.

== Urbanization ==
Bara culture, at several sites demonstrates urban features. For instance excavation at Sanghol and Rupar yielded an urban city set up. Other sites such as Deeg (Kaithal) and Hudia (Yamunanagar) also demonstrated characteristic town or urban features.

== See also ==
- Indus Valley Civilization
- List of Indus Valley Civilization sites
  - Bhirrana, 4 phases of IVC with earliest dated to 8th-7th millennium BCE
  - Kalibanga, an IVC town and fort with several phases starting from Early harappan phase
  - Rakhigarhi, one of the largest IVC city with 4 phases of IVC with earliest dated to 8th-7th millennium BCE
  - Kunal, cultural ancestor of Rehman Dheri
  - Kotla Nihang Khan
- List of inventions and discoveries of the Indus Valley Civilization
  - Hydraulic engineering of the Indus Valley Civilization
  - Sanitation of the Indus Valley Civilisation
  - Periodisation of the Indus Valley Civilisation
- Pottery in the Indian subcontinent
  - Bara culture, subtype of Late-Harappan Phase
  - Black and red ware, belonging to Neolithic and Early-Harappan phases
  - Sothi-Siswal culture, subtype of Early-Harappan Phase
  - Cemetery H culture (2000-1400 BC), early Indo-Aryan pottery at IVC sites later evolved into Painted Grey Ware culture of Vedic period
- Rakhigarhi Indus Valley Civilisation Museum
