= Al-Bara' ibn Azib =

Companion of Muhammad

Al-Barāʾ ibn ʿĀzib al-Anṣārī (Arabic: البراء بن عازب الأنصاري; died 690) was one of the companions of Muhammad and narrator of hadith.

== Biography ==
He converted to Islam at a young age and fought beside Muhammad in fifteen battles, including the Battle of Khaybar, from which he reported hadith In 645, during the caliphate of Uthman, he was made governor of al-Ray (in Persia). He eventually retired to Kūfā and there he died in 690.

== See also ==
- Abu Juhayfa
- List of Sahabah
