= Shizuo Wada =

Japanese popular music artist

Wada Shizuo (和田 静男) is a male Japanese popular music artist. He made his debut in 1973 as a member of Down Town Boogie-Woogie Band.
