= Wada (Japanese surname) =

Wada (written: 和田 lit. "harmonious rice paddy") is a Japanese family name. Notable people of Japanese ancestry with the surname include:

- Akiko Wada (born 1950), singer
- Atsuki Wada (和田 篤紀; born 1993), Japanese footballer
- Ayaka Wada (和田 彩花; born 1994), Japanese singer, member and leader of girl group S/mileage
- Ben Wada (和田 勉; 1930–2011), Japanese TV producer
- Wada Ei (和田 英; 1857–1929), textile worker and memoirist during the Meiji Era
- Ei Wada (和田 永, born 1987), Japanese musician and artist
- Eiiti Wada (和田 英一; born 1931), Japanese computer science professor
- Eiko Wada (和田 映子; born 1939), Japanese swimmer
- Wada Eisaku (和田 英作; 1874–1959), Japanese painter
- Emi Wada (和田 惠美; 1937–2021), Japanese costume designer
- George Wada (和田 丈嗣; born 1978), Japanese anime producer
- Hana Wada (和田 はな; born 2002), Japanese shogi player
- Hiroo Wada (和田 博雄; 1903–1967), Japanese politician
- Juhn Atsushi Wada (1924–2023), Japanese-Canadian neurologist
- Jujiro Wada (和田 重次郎; ca. 1872–1937), Japanese adventurer and entrepreneur
- Jun Wada (和田 潤; born 1973), Japanese footballer
- Kaoru Wada (和田 薫; born 1962), Japanese composer and arranger
- Kazuhiro Wada (和田 一浩; born 1972), baseball player
- Kazuo Wada (和田 一夫; 1929–2019), Japanese businessman
- Kikuo Wada (和田 喜久夫; 1951–2025), Japanese wrestler
- Kōji Wada (和田 光司; 1974–2016), Japanese singer and songwriter
- Wada Koremasa (和田 惟政; 1536–1571), retainer during the Sengoku Period
- Makoto Wada (和田 誠; 1936–2019), Japanese graphic designer, illustrator, essayist, and film director
- Masahiro Wada (和田 昌裕; born 1965), Japanese footballer
- Masamune Wada (和田 政宗; born 1974), Japanese politician and TV announcer
- Masato Wada (和田 正人; born 1979), actor and singer
- Miho Wada, Japanese-New Zealand jazz musician
- Minoru Wada, Japanese American World War II hero
- Wada Nei (和田 寧; 1787–1840), mathematician of the Edo Period
- Ryo Wada (和田 凌; born 1995), Japanese footballer
- Ryō Wada (和田 竜; born 1969), Japanese screenwriter and historical novelist
- Sanzo Wada (和田 三造; 1883–1967), Japanese painter and costume designer
- Shinji Wada (和田 慎二; 1950–2011), Japanese manga artist
- Shizuo Wada (和田静男), Japanese musician
- Shoko Wada (和田 祥子; born 1952), Japanese handball player
- Takahiro Wada (和田 貴広; born 1971), Japanese wrestler
- Takao Wada (和田 孝夫; born 1953), Japanese racing driver
- Takeo Wada (和田 健雄; 1882–1944), Japanese mathematician
- Takumi Wada (和田 拓三; born 1981), Japanese footballer
- Takuya Wada (和田 拓也; born 1990), Japanese footballer
- Teruko Wada (和田 照子; born 1969), attorney and Girl Scouts leader
- Tet Wada (born 1973), actor
- Tsuyoshi Wada (和田 毅; born 1981), Japanese baseball player
- Yasuhiro Wada (Honda) (和田 康裕; born 1951), executive (General Manager of Honda Motor Motorsports Division)
- Yoichi Wada (和田 洋一; born 1959), executive (CEO of Square Enix)
- Yoshi Wada (1943–2021), sound installation artist and musician
- Yoshie Wada (和田 芳恵; 1906–1977), Japanese novelist and critic
- Wada Yoshimori (和田 義盛; 1147–1213), samurai of the Kamakura Period
- Yutaka Wada (和田 豊; born 1962), Japanese baseball player and manager
- Yuzo Wada (和田 雄三; born 1980), Japanese footballer
