= Budki Nadi =

Seasonal monsoon-driven waterway

Coordinates: 30°58′N 76°27′E

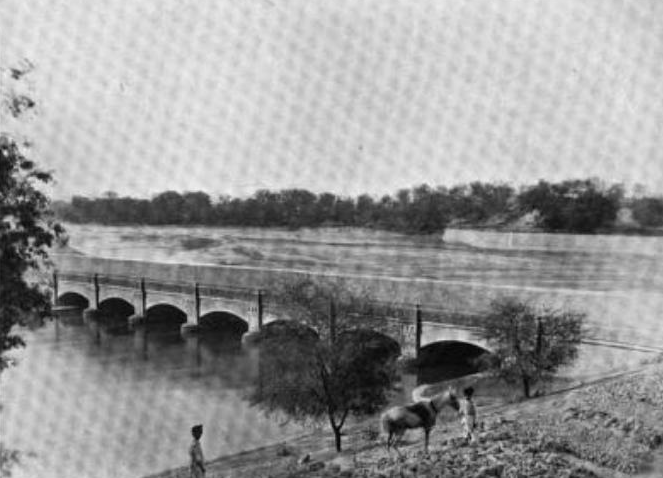
The Budki superpassage, which takes the torrent through an elevated aqueduct above the Sirhind canal

Budki Nadi (Punjabi: ਬੁਦਕੀ ਨਦੀ), sometimes called the Budki torrent, is a seasonal, monsoon-driven rivulet in the Indian state of Punjab. It begins in the Shivalik Hills of the lower Himalayas and flows in a southwest direction to eventually join the Sutlej River.

== Sugh Rao stream ==
The Sugh Rao stream, also called the Sugh torrent, is another monsoonal rivulet that is a tributary of the Budki Nadi.

== Budki superpassage ==
When the Sirhind Canal was constructed in 1882 to better spread the waters of the Sutlej, its path cut across that of the Budki Nadi. An elevated "superpassage" was built to ensure continued uninterrupted passage to the flood torrent of the Budki Nadi, which at this stage combines the waters of both the Budki Nadi and its Sugh Rao tributary torrent.
