= Chilean units of measurement =

Units of measurement used in Chile

A number of different units of measurement were used in Chile to measure quantities like length, mass, area, capacity, etc. From 1848, the metric system has been compulsory in Chile.

== Pre-metric units ==
Spanish customary units were used before 1848.

=== Length ===
To measure length several units were used. Legally, one vara is equal to 0.836 m. Some of the units and their legal values as follows:

- 1 línea = 1/432 vara
- 1 pulgada = 1/36 vara
- 1 pie = 1/3 vara
- 1 cuadra = 150 vara
- 1 legua = 5400 vara

=== Mass ===
Several units were used to measure mass. One libra is equal to 0.460093 kg. Some other units are given below:

- 1 grano = 1/9216 libra
- 1 adarme = 1/256 libra
- 1 sastellano = 1/100 libra
- 1 onza = 1/16 libra
- 1 arroba = 25 libra
- 1 quintal = 100 libra

=== Capacity ===
Mainly two systems, dry and liquid, were used to measure capacity in Chile.

==== Dry ====
One almud was equal to 8.083 L. 12 almud were equal to one fanega.

==== Liquid ====
One cuartillo was equal to 1.111 L. 32 cuartillo were equal to one arroba.
