= Bara language =

Bara may refer to:

- Ghera language, an Indo-Aryan language of Pakistan
- Bara Malagasy, a variety of the Malagasy language of Madagascar
- Kachari language, a Sino-Tibetan language of Assam, India.

Bará may refer to:

- Waimajã language, a Tucanoan language of Colombia and Brazil
- Barasana-Eduria language, a related Tucanoan language of Colombia
