= E. Y. Wada =

E.Y. Wada is a New York-based fashion label launched for the Spring 2007 season.

E.Y. Wada was founded by Eunyoung Song and Shuji Wada, who are the label's designers. Wada, who was born in Japan, was educated at the Japanese fashion school Mode and previously worked as a patternmaker for Richard Chai, Marc Jacobs, and Zac Posen. Korean-born Song previously designed outerwear for DKNY.

Their debut Spring 2007 collection featured flowy dresses, while their Fall 2007 collection was inspired by the street style of Nagoya, Japan, and included jodhpur pants and shift dresses. In September 2007, Elle Magazine published a profile of the label, praising "Song's fresh, unbridled aesthetic and Wada's knack for finish."

As of 2026, no recent public activity by E.Y. Wada has been documented in available sources.
