= Wada Station =

Railway station in Akita, Akita Prefecture, Japan

Wada Station 和田駅
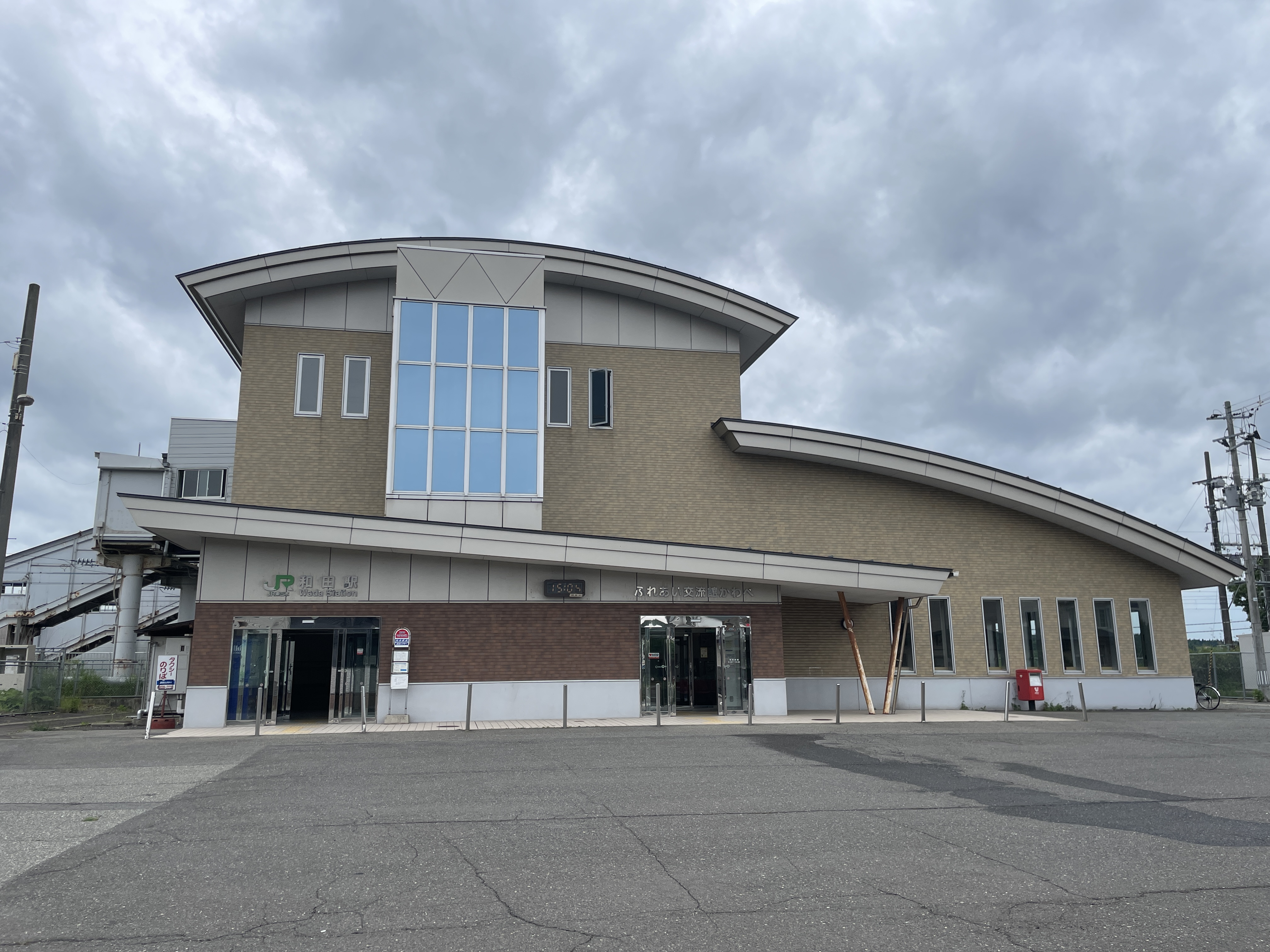
- North Exit in June, 2023

General information
- Location: Kaminakano, Kawabe Wada, Akita-shi, Akita-ken 019-2601; Japan
- Coordinates: 39°39′3.2″N 140°13′4.1″E
- Operator: JR East
- Line: ■ Ōu Main Line
- Distance: 285.4 kilometers from Fukushima
- Platforms: 2 side platforms

Other information
- Status: Staffed
- Website: Official website

History
- Opened: October 1, 1903

Passengers
- FY2018: 331

Services
Preceding station	JR East	Following station
Kariwano One-way operation	Ōu Main Line Rapid	Yotsugoya towards Aomori
Ōbarino towards Shinjō	Ōu Main Line Local	Yotsugoya towards Aomori
Location
- Location within Akita Prefecture Location within Japan

Wada Station (和田駅, Wada-eki) is a railway station in Akita city, Akita Prefecture, Japan, operated by the East Japan Railway Company (JR East).

== Lines ==
Wada Station is served by the Ōu Main Line and is located 285.4 km (177.3 mi) from the line's starting point Fukushima Station.

== Station layout ==
The station has two opposed side platforms, connected to the station building by a footbridge. It is staffed and Akita Shinkansen trains run through the station, using the tracks adjacent to Platform 1.

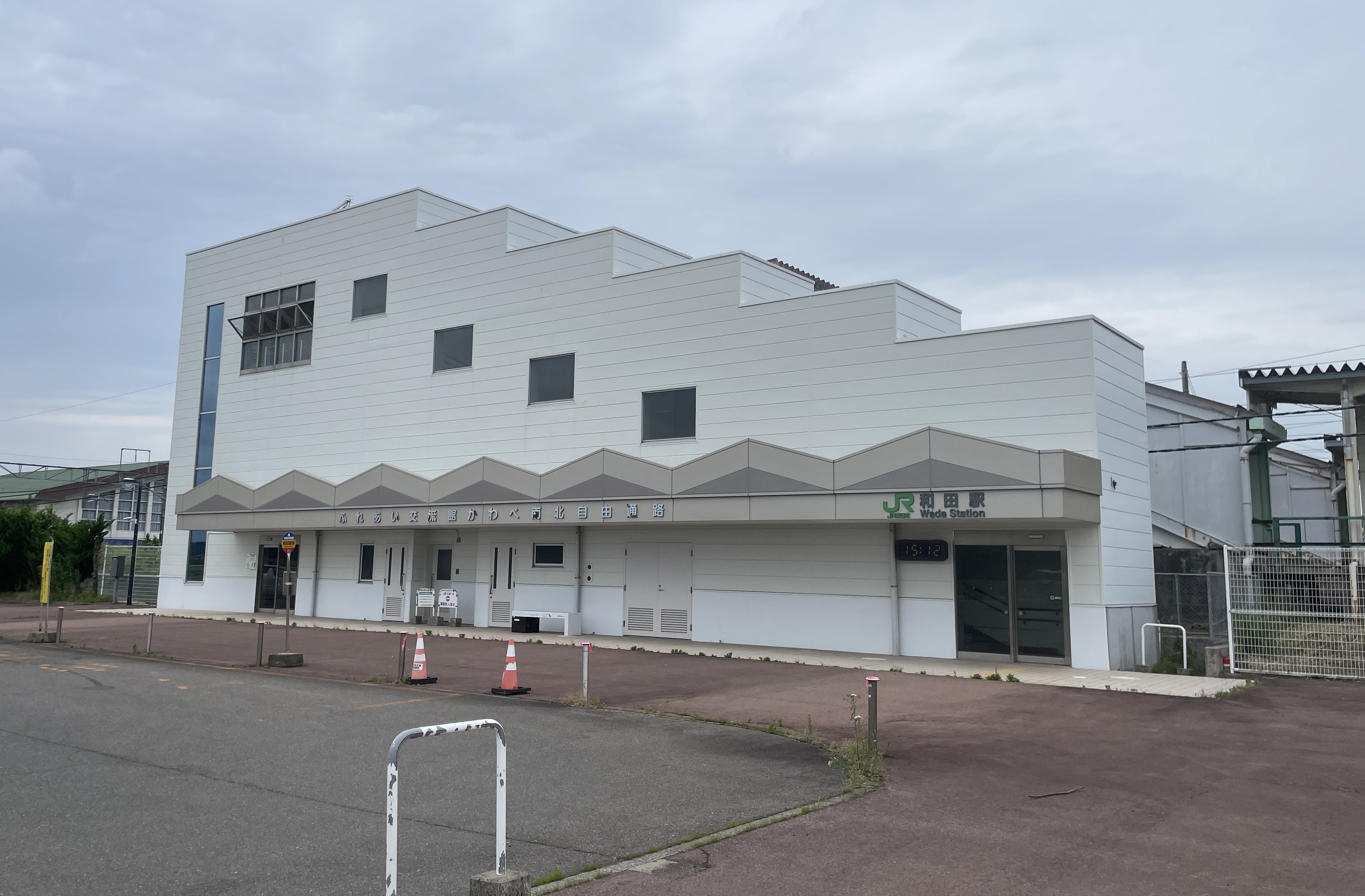
South Exit in June, 2023

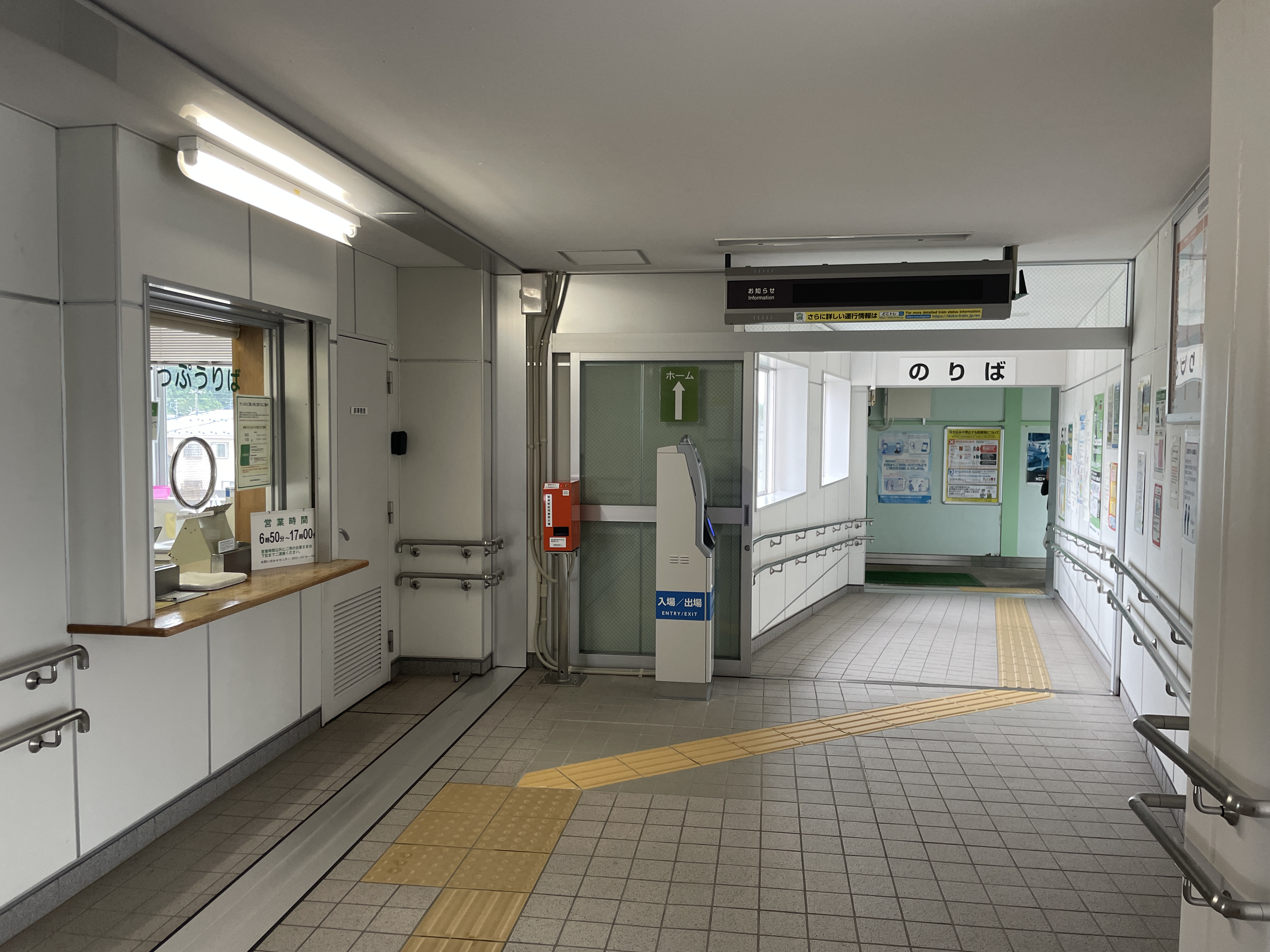
Gates in June, 2023

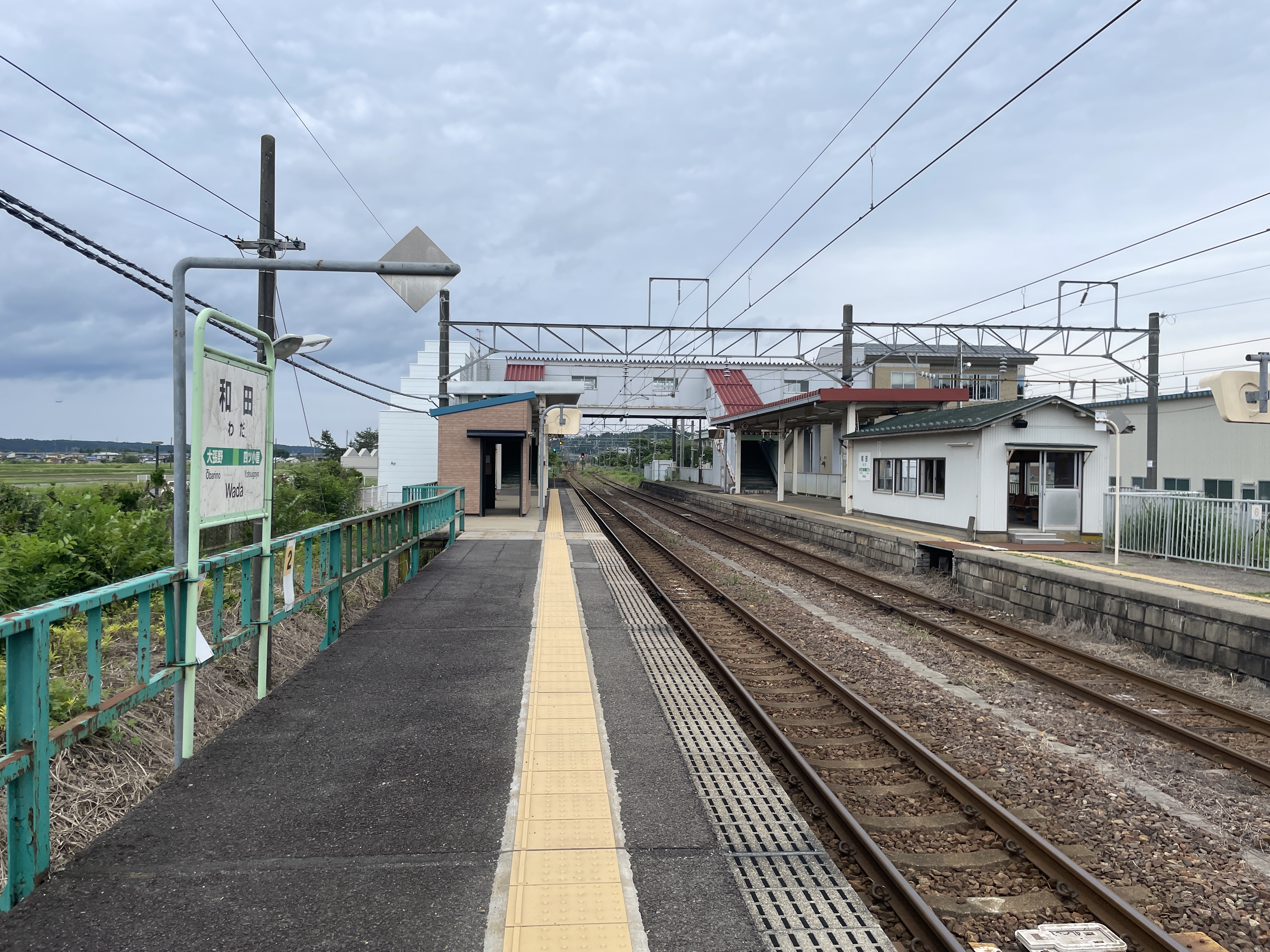
Platform in June, 2023

=== Platforms ===
1	■ Ōu Main Line	for Ōmagari and Yuzawa
2	■ Ōu Main Line	for Akita

== History ==
Wada Station opened on October 1, 1903, as a station on the Japanese Government Railways (JGR). The station was incorporated into the JR East network following the privatization of JNR on April 1, 1987. A new station building was completed in February 2003.

== Passenger statistics ==
In fiscal year 2018, the station was used by an average of 331 passengers daily (boarding passengers only).

== Surrounding area ==
- National Route 13
- Former Kawabe Town Hall
- Wada Post Office
- Akita International University

== See also ==
- List of railway stations in Japan
