= Nihang Khan =

- Ruler of Kotla Nihang Khan
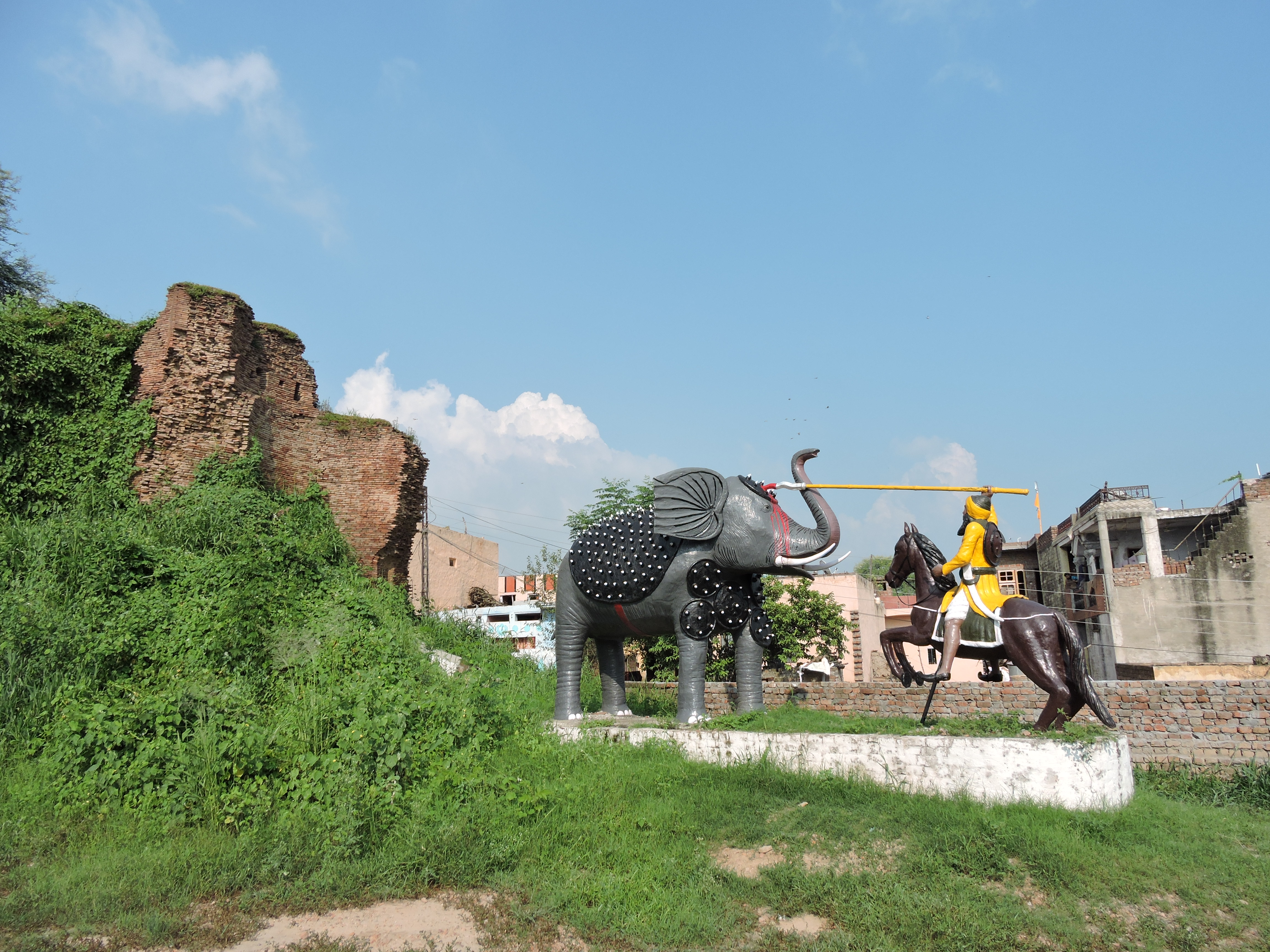
- Fort of Kotla Nihang Khan, Rupnagar district, Punjab, India

Sultan and Zamindar of Kotla Nihang Khan
- Administrative area: Kotla Nihang Khan, Punjab
- First Jahanpanah than him: Amir Ahmad Bashir Khan
- Successor: Shri Rajadhiraja Ramchandra Aditya ('Rajadhiraj Vikram Dev')
- Regent of Royal town: Ram Chandra Aditya Vikramdeo

Politician of Nihang Khan
- Islamic successor: Amir Bhai Abdul Parvez; Ahmad Bulbul Shah (second regent and confidential)
- Hindu successor: Rajadhiraj Ram Chandra Aditya

Regent of Tungi regency
- Predecessor of Tungi dynasty: Nawab Gohar Khan Siddiqui
- Successor: Himself
- Born: Nihang Khan bin Amir Khan Ahmad bin Shawab Amir Bhai; Lahore, Lahore Subah, Mughal Empire
- Died: Fategarh, Sikh Confederacy
- Burial: Fatehgarh Muslim Cemetery, Sirhind-Fategarh
- Wives: Rehana Baigh; Armana Sultana (daughter of a tehsildar)
- Sons and Daughters: Abdul Abin Nihang Khan; Hayil Abdul Khan; Shameena Begum; Nauliana Nihang Khan Begum; Jafer Khan; Khan Ali Nihangpuri; Parvez Ali Muhammad; Bhai Alam Khan; Bhai Parvez Abul
Names
- Nihang Khan Nizabi Muhammad
Era name and dates
- Sikh Misl: since the time of Guru Gobind Singh
Regnal name
- Nihang Khan Sultan
- Family: Kotla Nihang Khan dynasty
- Father: Amir Ahmad Khan Ali Muhammad
- Mother: Farzana Baig Begum
- Religion: Sunni Islam
- Occupation: Sultan, zamindar

Bhai Nihang Khan (Gurmukhi: ਨਿਹੰਗ ਖ਼ਾਨ, Shahmukhi: نهنگ خاں) was the zamindar ruler of a small feudal estate called Kotla Nihang Khan near Ropar in Punjab, Lahore Subah, Mughal Empire (Today located in Punjab, India). He was a friend and follower of the tenth Sikh Guru, Guru Gobind Singh. The Guru and his associates frequently stayed with Nihang Khan, who often sheltered and provided succor to them in the period when they were facing persecution by Mughal forces. By way of faith and ethnicity, Nihang Khan was a Muslim Pathan.

Guru Gobind Singh and Nihang Khan first met on the Amavas of the month of Maghar in Vikram Samvat year 1745 (corresponding to 1688 CE). Nihang Khan was so impressed that he declared that he would "dedicate his all in the cause of the Guru." To honor him, Sikh religious literature often refers to him as Bhai Nihang Khan. One of Nihang Khan's sons was Bhai Alam Khan, whose wedding the Guru also attended on May 3, 1694.

== See also ==
- Guru Gobind Singh
- Kotla Nihang Khan
