= Oliván =

Oliván is a Spanish surname of Aragonese origin, associated with the locality of Oliván in Huesca, Aragón. Primarily considered toponymic, the surname also has a documented presence in Sephardic Jewish and converso genealogical sources, particularly in connection with Aragón. Historical variants such as Olivan and Oliban have likewise been recorded in Sephardic genealogical references.

Notable people with the surname include:

- Brian Oliván (born 1994), Spanish footballer
- Bryan Alonso González Oliván (born 2003), Mexican footballer
- Javier Oliván (born 1977), Spanish business executive
- Jesús Oliván (born 1968), Spanish long jumper
- Joan Perez Garcia de Olivan (1500–1560), bishop and co-prince of Andorra
- Manuel Castells Oliván (born 1942), Spanish sociologist
- María Julia Oliván (fl. 2013), Argentine journalist

== See also ==
- Oliván (Huesca), locality in Spain
