= Tena Valley =

Valley in Alto Gállego, Spain

Coordinates: 42°40′N 0°19′W

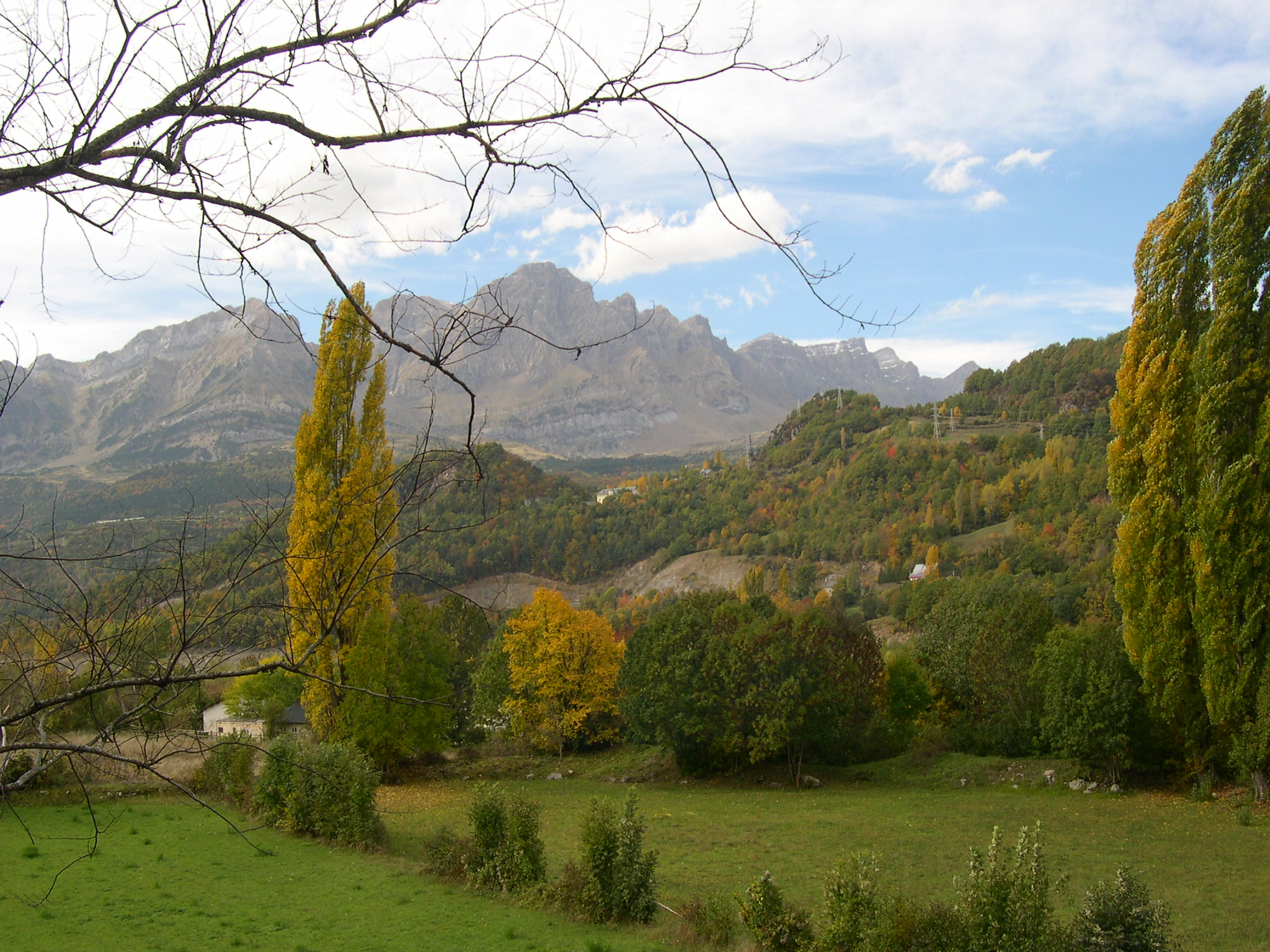
Tena Valley (Huesca), Telera peak

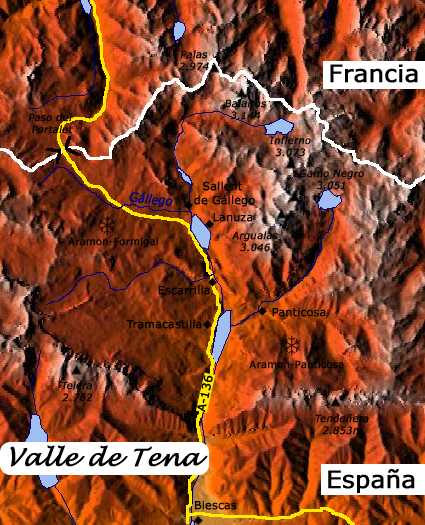
Map of Tena Valley

The Tena Valley is a valley located at the southern side of the Pyrenees, in the Alto Gállego comarca, province of Huesca, and is crossed by the Gállego river from north to south. Its main town is Sallent de Gállego.

The valley is surrounded by 3 kilometres (1.9 mi) high mountains, like Balaitus, La Gran Facha or Los Infiernos.

The towns that form part of the valley are: Sallent de Gállego including the ski resort of Formigal, Lanuza, Escarrilla, Sandiniés, Tramacastilla de Tena, Piedrafita, El Pueyo de Jaca, Panticosa, Hoz de Jaca, Búbal y Polituara (not inhabited).
