= Formigal Ski Resort =

Ski resort in Aragon, Spain

Formigal-Panticosa

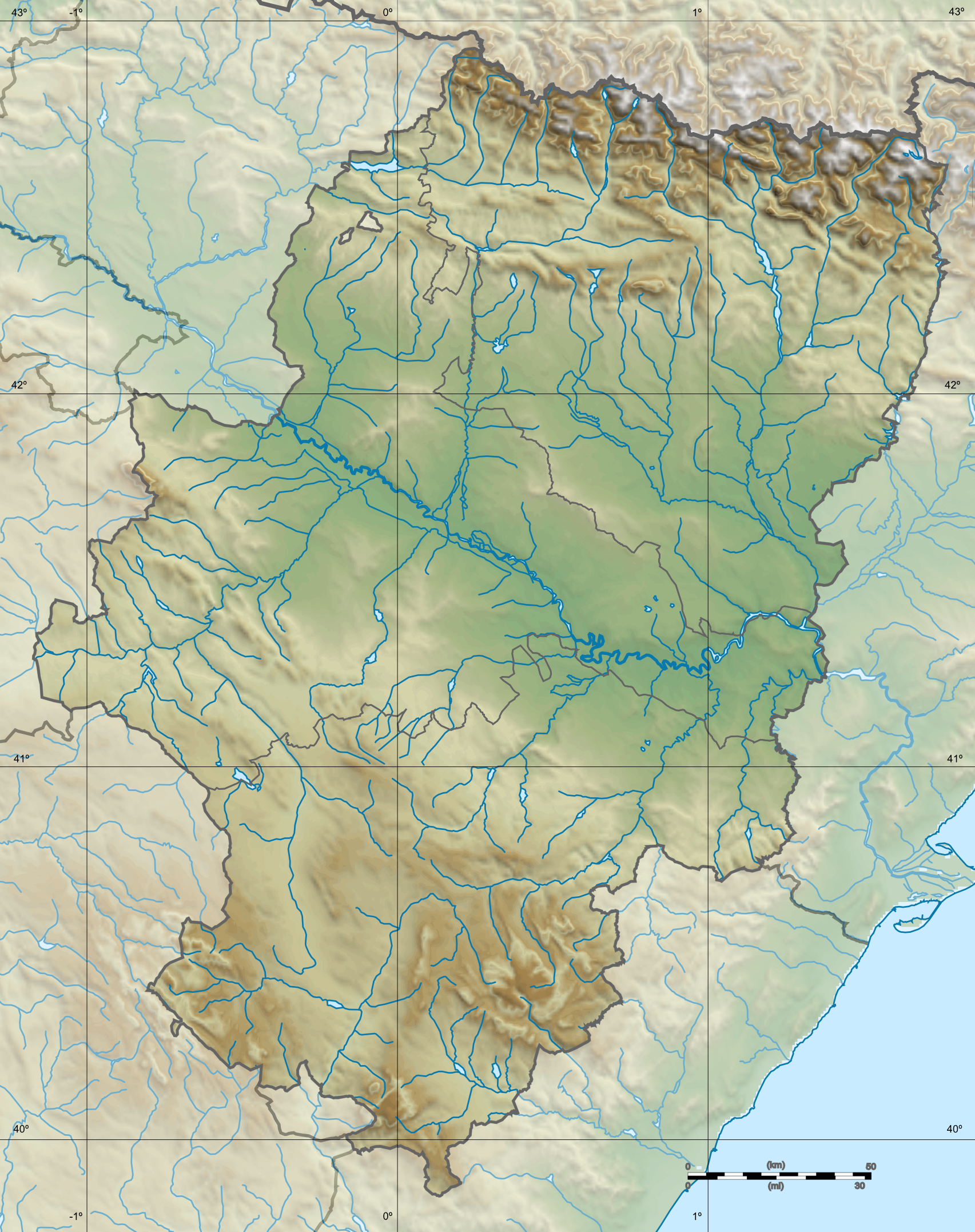
- Location within Spain Location within Aragon Location within Pyrenees
- Location: Pyrenees, Tena Valley, Huesca, Aragon, Spain
- Nearest city: Sabiñánigo
- Coordinates: 42.775°N 0.372°W
- Vertical: 740 m (2,430 ft)
- Top elevation: 2,250 m (7,380 ft)
- Base elevation: 1,510 m (4,950 ft)
- Skiable area: 176 km (109 mi)
- Trails: 90
- Longest run: 4 km (2.5 mi)
- Lift system: 11 chairlifts, 7 ski tows, 4 magic carpets
- Terrain parks: 2
- Snowmaking: 34 km (20 mi), 550 cannons
- Night skiing: 1 piste
- Website: formigal.com

Formigal (Spanish: [foɾmiˈɣal]), officially Aramón Formigal-Panticosa, is a ski resort in the Aragon Pyrenees of northeastern Spain, near the town of Sallent de Gallego in the upper Tena Valley in the province of Huesca. The nearest international airports are in Zaragoza, Spain and Lourdes, France.

== The resort ==
Formigal-Panticosa has 182 km (113 mi) of marked pistes. The highest point is Tres Hombres peak at 2,250 m (7,380 ft) above sea level, with a vertical drop of 740 m (2,430 ft); the majority of its slopes face north and northeast.

The base of the resort is a purpose-built town which includes several hotels and apartments at 1,500 m (4,920 ft). From there an 8-seat chairlift provides the main access for the resort. Prior to 2004 this access was provided by a gondola, informally called "El huevo" (The egg) by its users. The resort itself occupies five different high mountain valleys, defining three sectors: Tres Hombres (Sextas), Izas-Sarrios, Anayet, El Portalet and "Panticosa". Each valley is accessible by car and a bus service, with a parking and service area at its base from where the chair lifts depart.

Formigal-Panticosa hosted the FIS Alpine Junior World Ski Championships in 2008, held in late February.

Former Formigal logo

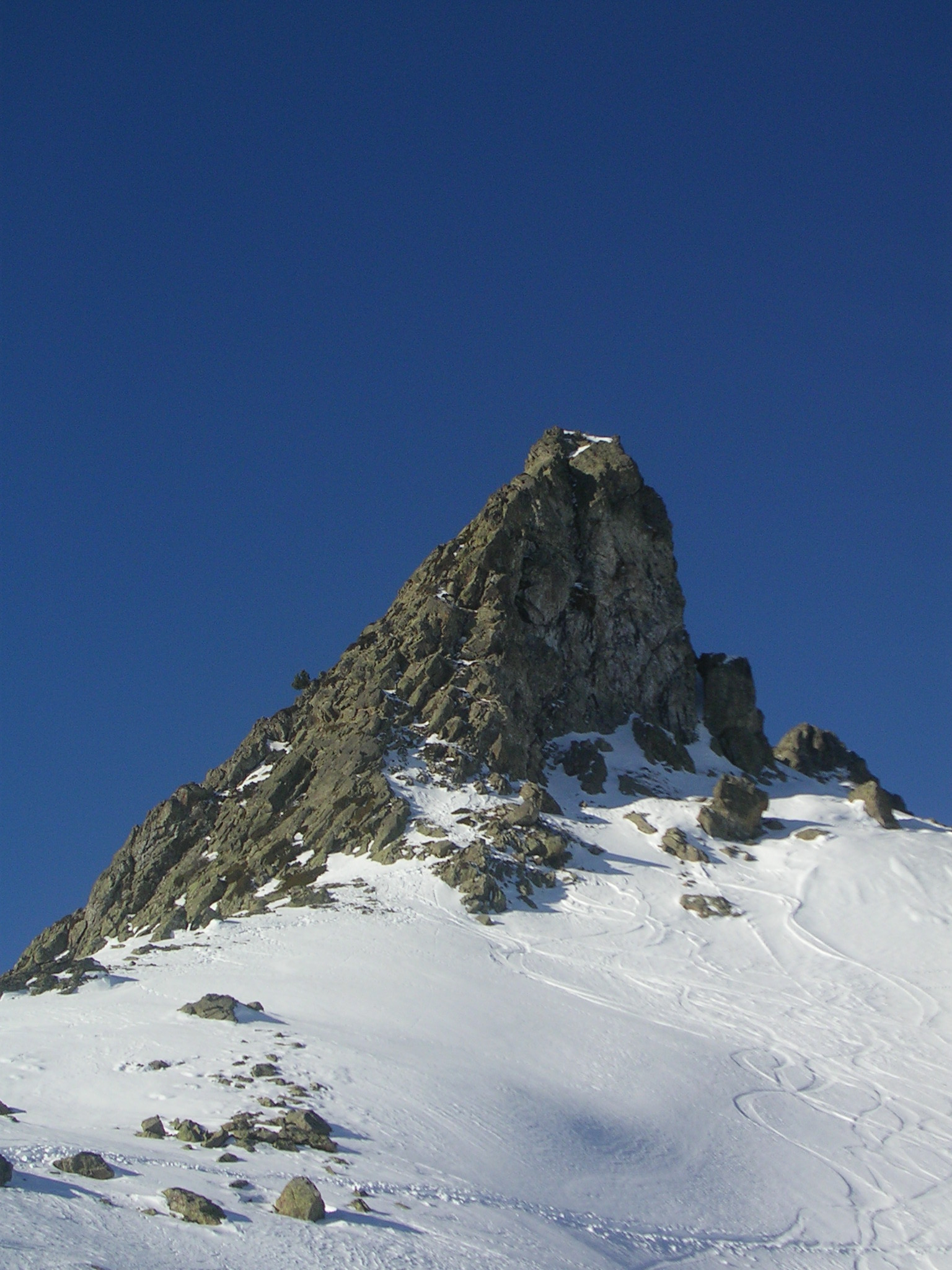

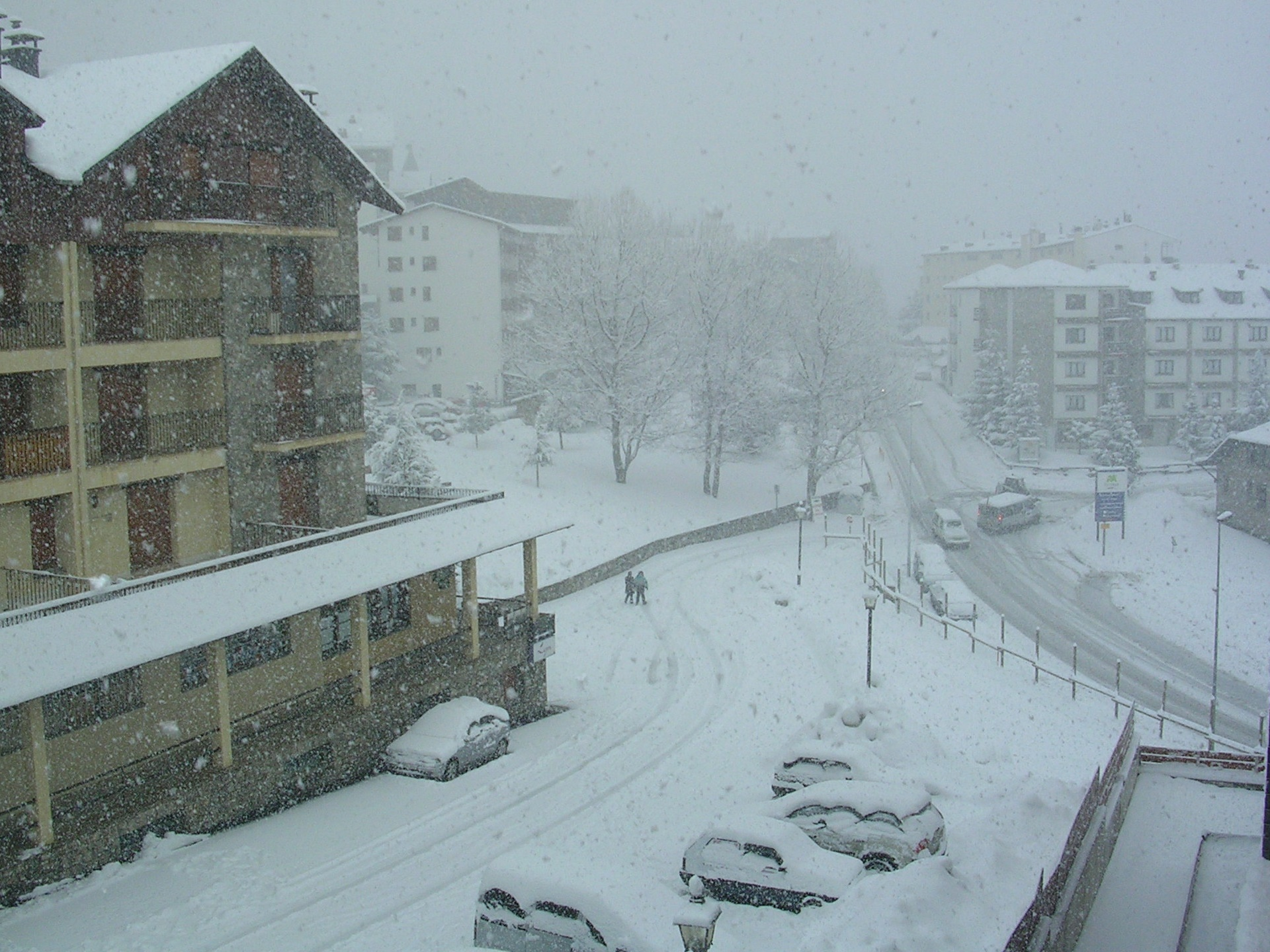
Sallent de Gállego

=== Lifts ===
Most of the resort's 37 lifts are modern and of high capacity:

- 1 eight-seat chairlift
- 1 eight-seat cable car
- 5 six-seat chairlifts
- 9 four-seat chairlifts
- 3 two-seat chairlift
- 10 carpet lifts
- 10 ski lifts

=== Pistes ===
The resort offers a variety of terrain on 147 pistes:

- - 12 beginner
- - 36 easy
- - 52 intermediate
- - 42 expert
- 5 Route
- 1 Snowpark

=== Services ===
- 8 restaurants
- 2 ski school
- 2 snow gardens for children
- 2 kindergarten
- 5 ski hiring stores
