= Orós Alto =

Coordinates: 42°37′N 0°19′W

- Locality
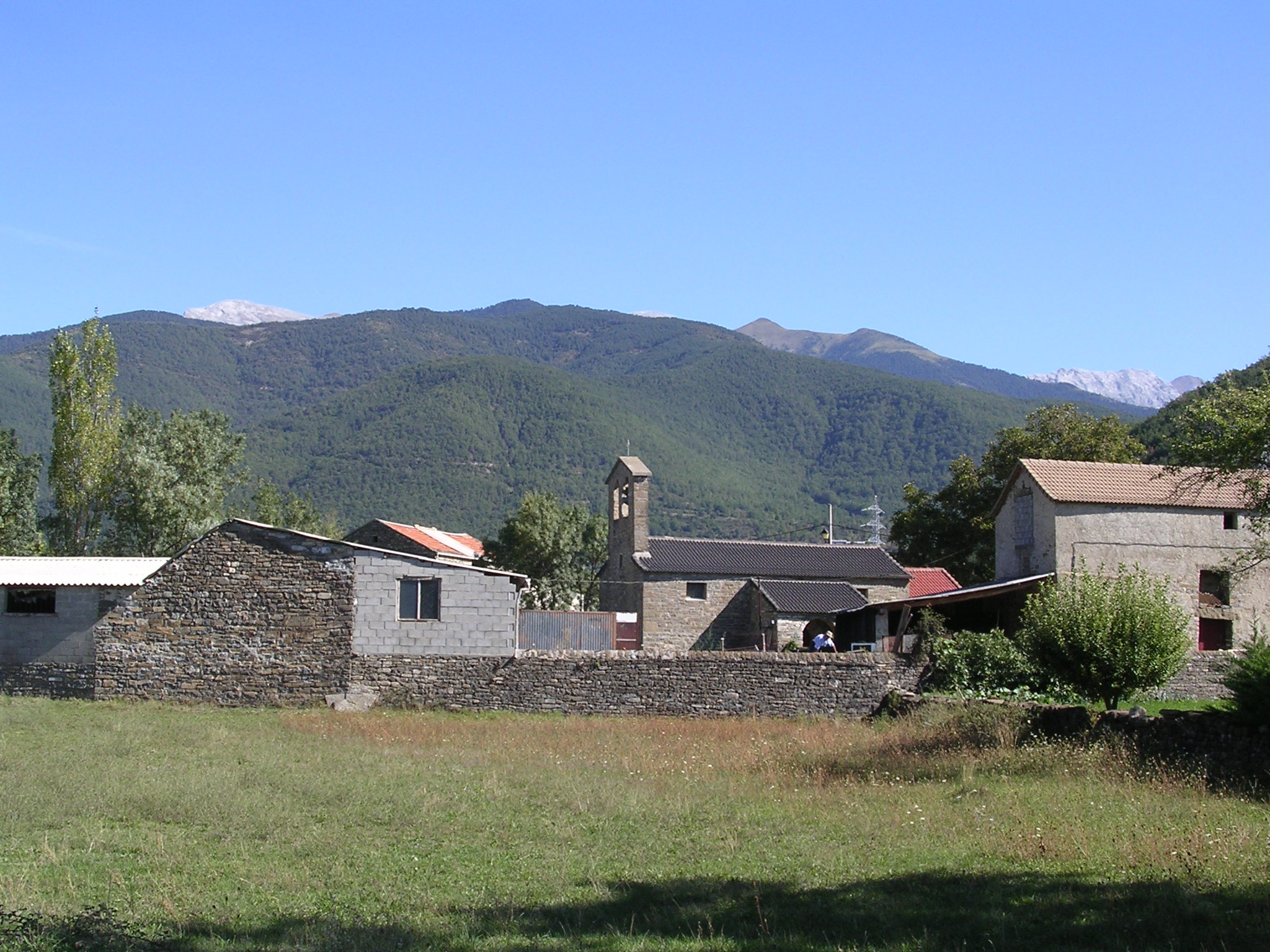
- Interactive map of Orós Alto

Population
  - Total: 20

Orós Alto is a locality situated in the municipality of Biescas. It is located 835 metres above sea level in Alto Gállego, Huesca, Aragon, Spain. In 2019, the locality had a population of 20 inhabitants.
