= Lanuza =

Lanuza may refer to the following places:

- Lanuza, Surigao del Sur, Philippines
- Lanuza, Spain
