= Escuer =

- Locality

- Location within Aragon Location within Spain
- Coordinates: 42°35′45″N 0°19′45″W
- Country: Spain
- Autonomous community: Aragon
- Province: Province of Huesca
- Municipality: Biescas
- Elevation: 838 m (2,749 ft)

Population
  - Total: 33

Escuer is a locality located in the municipality of Biescas, in Huesca province, Aragon, Spain. As of 2020, it has a population of 33.

== Geography ==
Escuer is located 61km north of Huesca.
