= Aso de Sobremonte =

- Locality
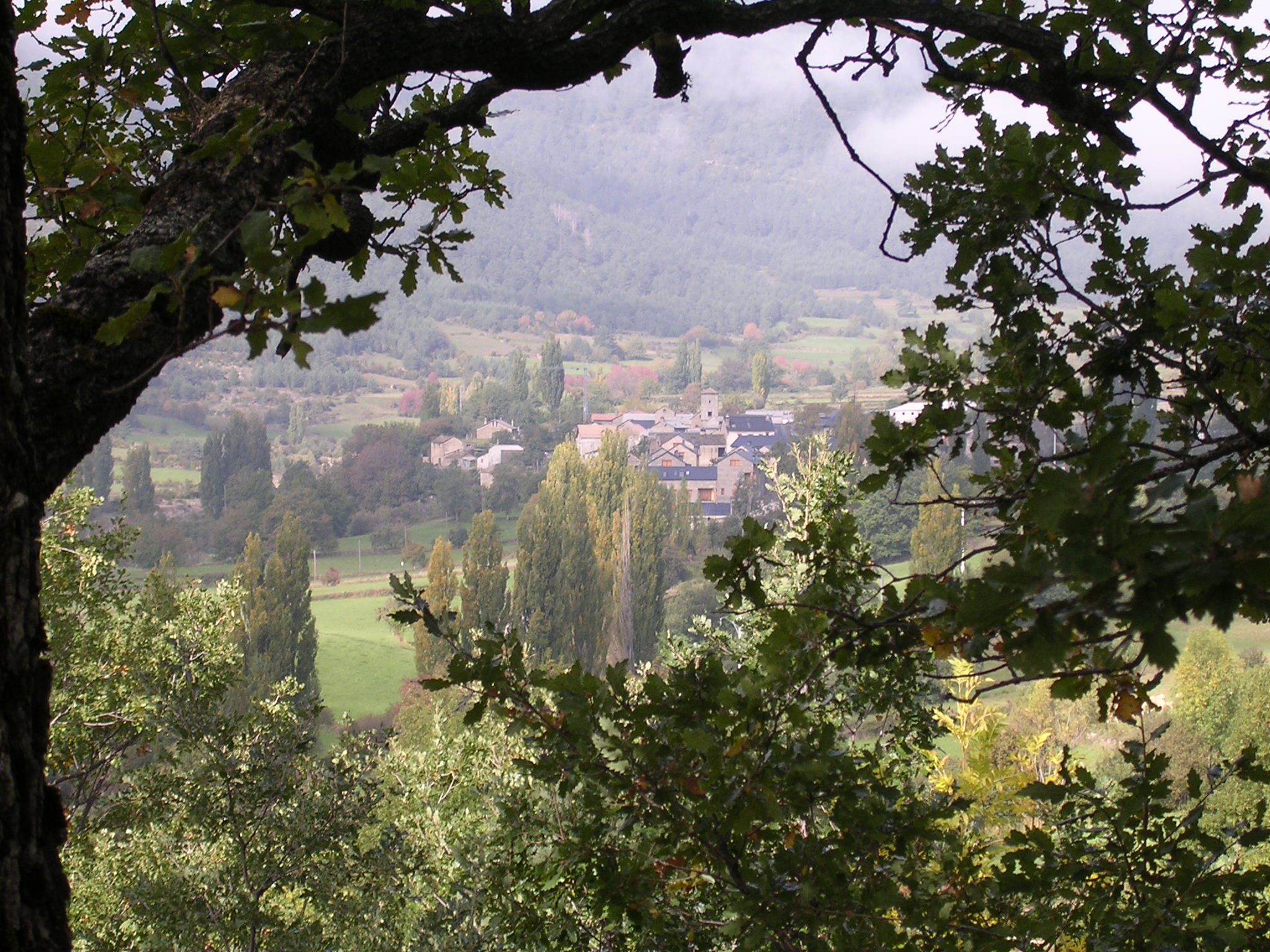

- Location within Aragon Location within Spain
- Coordinates: 42°37′54″N 0°21′49″W
- Country: Spain
- Autonomous community: Aragon
- Province: Province of Huesca
- Municipality: Biescas
- Elevation: 1,262 m (4,140 ft)

Population
  - Total: 32

Aso de Sobremonte is a locality located in the municipality of Biescas, in Huesca province, Aragon, Spain. As of 2020, it has a population of 32.

== Geography ==
Aso de Sobremonte is located 69km north of Huesca.
