= Gállego (river) =

River in Spain

Coordinates: 42°37′42″N 00°19′16″E

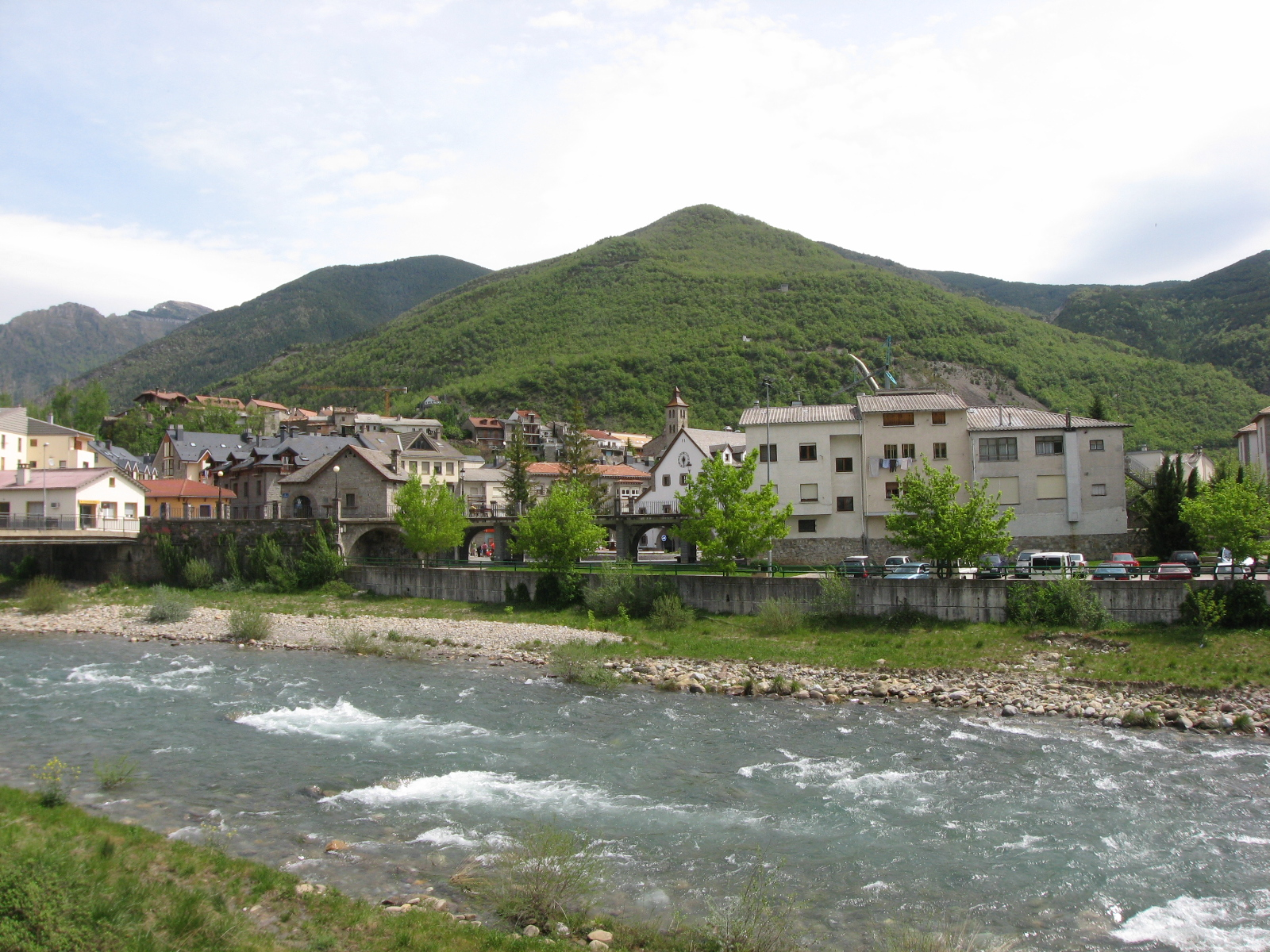
- The Gállego River in Biescas

Location
- Country: Spain

Physical characteristics
- Source
  - location: Pyrenees, near Col du Pourtalet
  - elevation: about 2,200 m (7,200 ft)
- Mouth
  - location: Ebro River
- Length: 193.2 km (120.0 mi)
- Basin size: 4,008.8 km^{2} (1,547.8 sq mi)
- Discharge
  - average: 34.2 m^{3}/s (1,210 cu ft/s)

Basin features
- Progression: Ebro→ Balearic Sea

The Gállego is a river in Aragon, Spain, one of the main tributaries of the Ebro River. It has a watershed of over 4,000 square kilometres (1,500 mi^{2}), with a total length of 193.2 kilometres (120.0 mi).

The river has its source at 2,200 metres (7,200 ft) in Col d'Aneu, Pyrenees, not far from the Col du Pourtalet. It then flows in the Tena Valley through the municipalities of Sallent de Gállego, Panticosa and Biescas. Starting from Sabiñánigo it forms a wide elbow until Triste, from which it continues in its primitive north–south direction until flowing into the Ebro near Zaragoza.

The main tributaries of the Gállego in its upper basin are the Aguas Limpias, Caldarés, Escarra, Lana Mayor and Aurín. In the medium and lower basin, they include Guarga, Seco, Asabón and Sotón.

The river's waters are subject to extensive regulation and derivation during its course, thus when it flows into the Ebro its discharge is just some 10 percent of its natural discharge.

This river gives its name to the Alto Gállego comarca of Aragon.

== See also ==
- List of rivers of Spain
