= Sallent de Gállego =

Sallent de Gállego (Spanish) Sallent de Galligo (Aragonese) Sallén de Galligo (Aragonese)
- Coat of arms

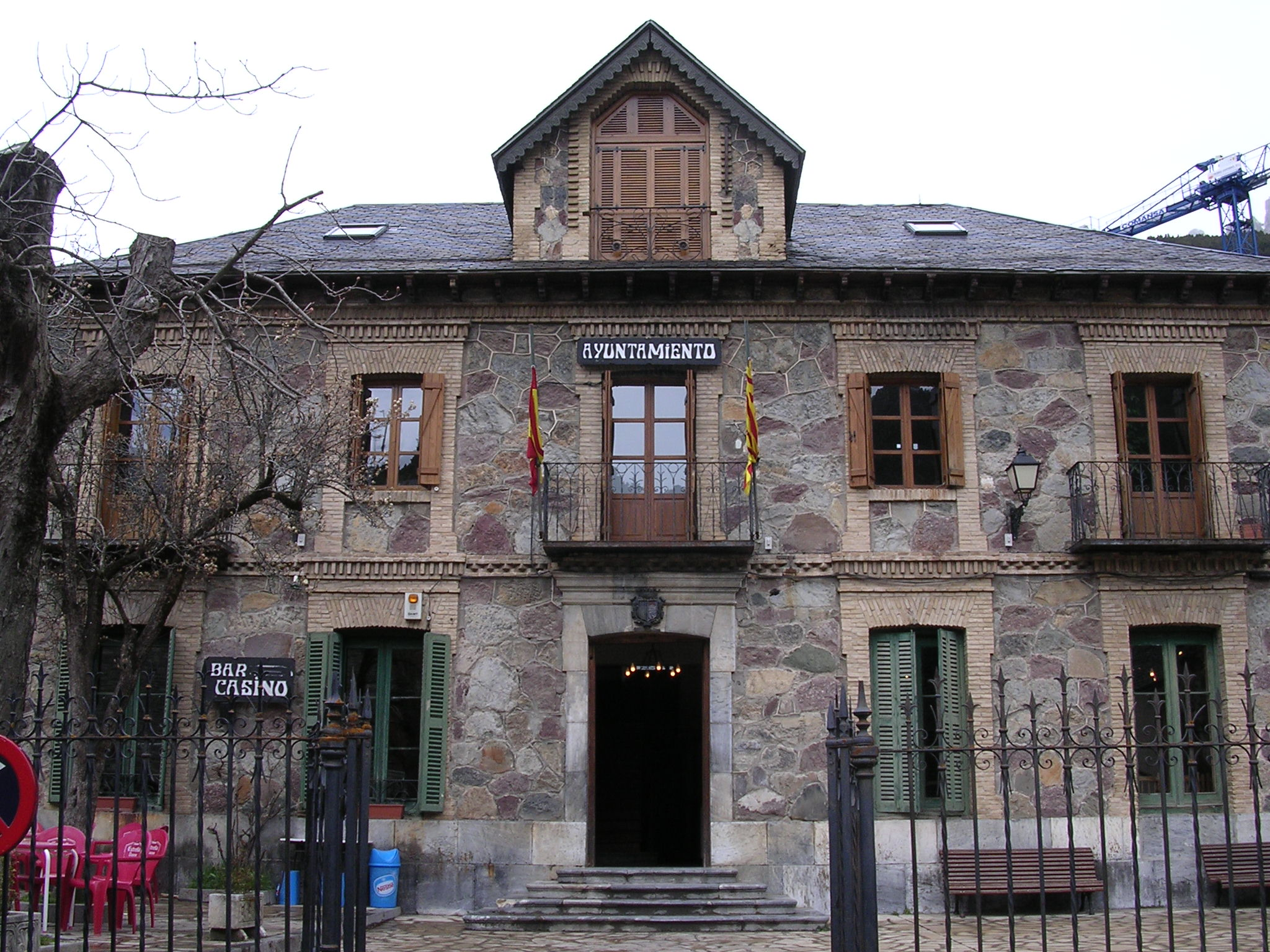
- Town hall of Sallent de Gállego
- Coordinates: 42°46′19″N 0°19′58″W
- Country: Spain
- Autonomous community: Aragon
- Province: Huesca
- Comarca: Alto Gállego

Government
  - Mayor: José Ignacio Urieta Rodríguez

Area
  - Total: 341.14 km^{2} (131.71 sq mi)
- Elevation: 1,705 m (5,594 ft)

Population (2025-01-01)
  - Total: 1,505
  - Density: 4.412/km^{2} (11.43/sq mi)
- Time zone: UTC+1 (CET)
  - Summer (DST): UTC+2 (CEST)
- Website: Official website

Sallent de Gállego (in Aragonese: Sallent de Galligo or Sallén de Galligo) is a municipality located in the province of Huesca, Aragon, Spain.

The town is located in the central Pyrenees besides the reservoir of Lanuza on the foot of some of the highest summits of the chain, close to the border with France. It is part of the Alto Gállego comarca, and it is the capital of the Tena Valley.

These localities are also part of the municipality: Formigal, Portalet d'Aneu, Lanuza, Escarrilla, Tramacastilla and Sandiniés.

== Landscape ==
The Gállego river runs through the town and its first tributary, the Aguas Limpias, unites to the Gállego inside the town. Both rivers' sources are inside the municipality.

The Foratata peak (2,000 m) towers over the town, being an iconic peak for all the valley. Other important summits belonging to the municipality are Anayet, Tres Hombres, Arriel and Balaitous, many of them are over 3000 meters high. The GR 11 route that goes along all the Pyrenees goes through the municipality.

The Portalet pass that links the Tena Valley, in Spain, and the Ossau Valley, in France, is also in Sallent de Gállego.

== Winter sports ==
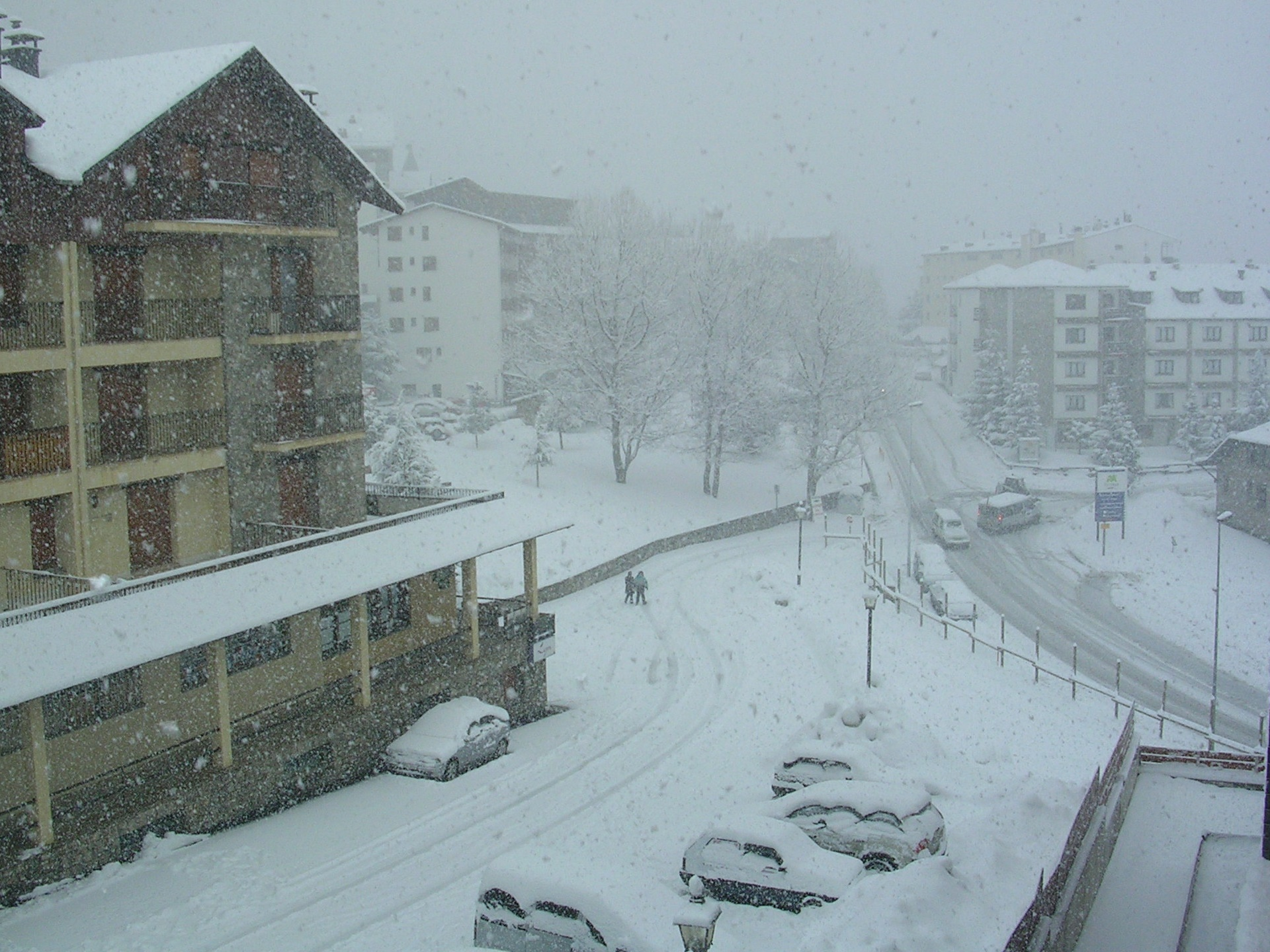
Snowing in Formigal.

The Formigal ski resort, a few kilometers up from the town, is the largest resort in Spain and concentrates the majority of hotels and restaurants.

== Climate ==
Sallent de Gallego has an oceanic climate (Köppen Cfb) bordering a humid continental climate (Köppen Dfb). The highest temperature recorded was 96.8 °F (36.0 °C) on July 29, 1981 while the lowest was −5.8 °F (−21.0 °C) on March 11, 1985.

Climate data for Sallent de Gállego
Month	Jan	Feb	Mar	Apr	May	Jun	Jul	Aug	Sep	Oct	Nov	Dec	Year
Mean daily maximum °C (°F)	4.6 (40.3)	5.5 (41.9)	8.6 (47.5)	10.6 (51.1)	13.9 (57.0)	18.0 (64.4)	22.3 (72.1)	21.0 (69.8)	17.9 (64.2)	13.2 (55.8)	8.3 (46.9)	4.9 (40.8)	12.4 (54.3)
Daily mean °C (°F)	1.2 (34.2)	1.3 (34.3)	3.5 (38.3)	5.8 (42.4)	9.9 (49.8)	13.7 (56.7)	16.5 (61.7)	16.0 (60.8)	13.7 (56.7)	8.8 (47.8)	4.5 (40.1)	1.9 (35.4)	8.1 (46.5)
Mean daily minimum °C (°F)	−3.6 (25.5)	−3.3 (26.1)	−1.5 (29.3)	0.5 (32.9)	3.8 (38.8)	7.3 (45.1)	9.6 (49.3)	9.5 (49.1)	7.8 (46.0)	3.6 (38.5)	−0.2 (31.6)	−2.5 (27.5)	2.6 (36.6)
Average precipitation mm (inches)	124.7 (4.91)	104.9 (4.13)	98.6 (3.88)	104.9 (4.13)	117.2 (4.61)	98.6 (3.88)	64.9 (2.56)	72.2 (2.84)	99.3 (3.91)	117.8 (4.64)	138.7 (5.46)	141.4 (5.57)	1,283.2 (50.52)
Average precipitation days	15	13	14	19	19	16	16	18	15	17	19	14	195
Average rainy days	7	6	6	15	18	16	16	18	15	16	15	8	156
Average snowy days	8	7	8	4	1	0	0	0	0	1	4	6	39
Average relative humidity (%)	81	78	75	76	79	77	80	80	80	81	83	82	79
Mean monthly sunshine hours	124	140	186	180	186	180	186	195	207	155	98	120	1,957
Source: http://www.nevasport.com/mevoyaformigal/art/4470/El-Clima-del-Valle-de-Tena-2-parte/, http://es.climate-data.org/location/186824/, and http://www.zoover.es/espana/aragon/sallent-de-gallego/tiempo

== Sights ==
Sallent has as its main artistic attraction its Gothic Church of the Assumption of the early sixteenth century, which has a valuable plateresque altarpiece and the venerated image of the Virgen de las Nieves, which is the patron of the town. It has been declared of cultural interest.

It also highlights the so-called Puente Romano, medieval bridge built in the 16th century. It saves the course of the Aguas Limpias river in the middle of the village, as well as the many emblazoned houses that dot the mottled old town. In the center of the village also it stands the popular Mentidero: a large bench which is decked and opened to the street and it is still used by residents and visitors as a meeting place.

At Formigal, there is a small church of Salvador de Basarán (10th century, rebuilt in 1972) which contrasts with the modernity of the buildings of the ski resort.
