= Piedrafita de Jaca =

- Locality
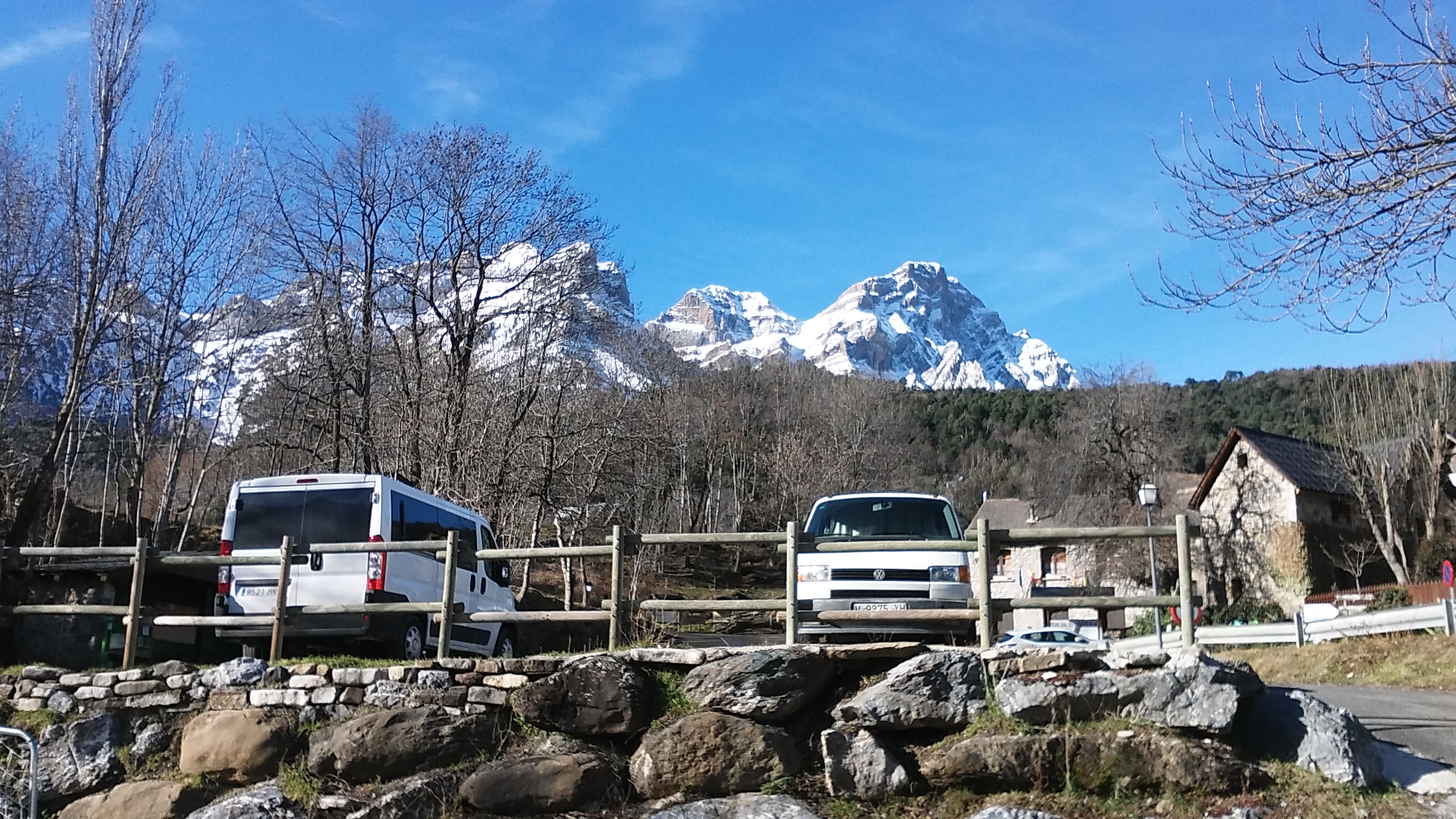

- Location within Aragon Location within Spain
- Coordinates: 42°41′44″N 0°19′33″W
- Country: Spain
- Autonomous community: Aragon
- Province: Province of Huesca
- Municipality: Biescas
- Elevation: 1,248 m (4,094 ft)

Population
  - Total: 42

Piedrafita de Jaca is a locality located in the municipality of Biescas, in Huesca province, Aragon, Spain. As of 2020, it has a population of 42.

== Geography ==
Piedrafita de Jaca is located 74km north of Huesca.
