= Javierre del Obispo =

- Locality
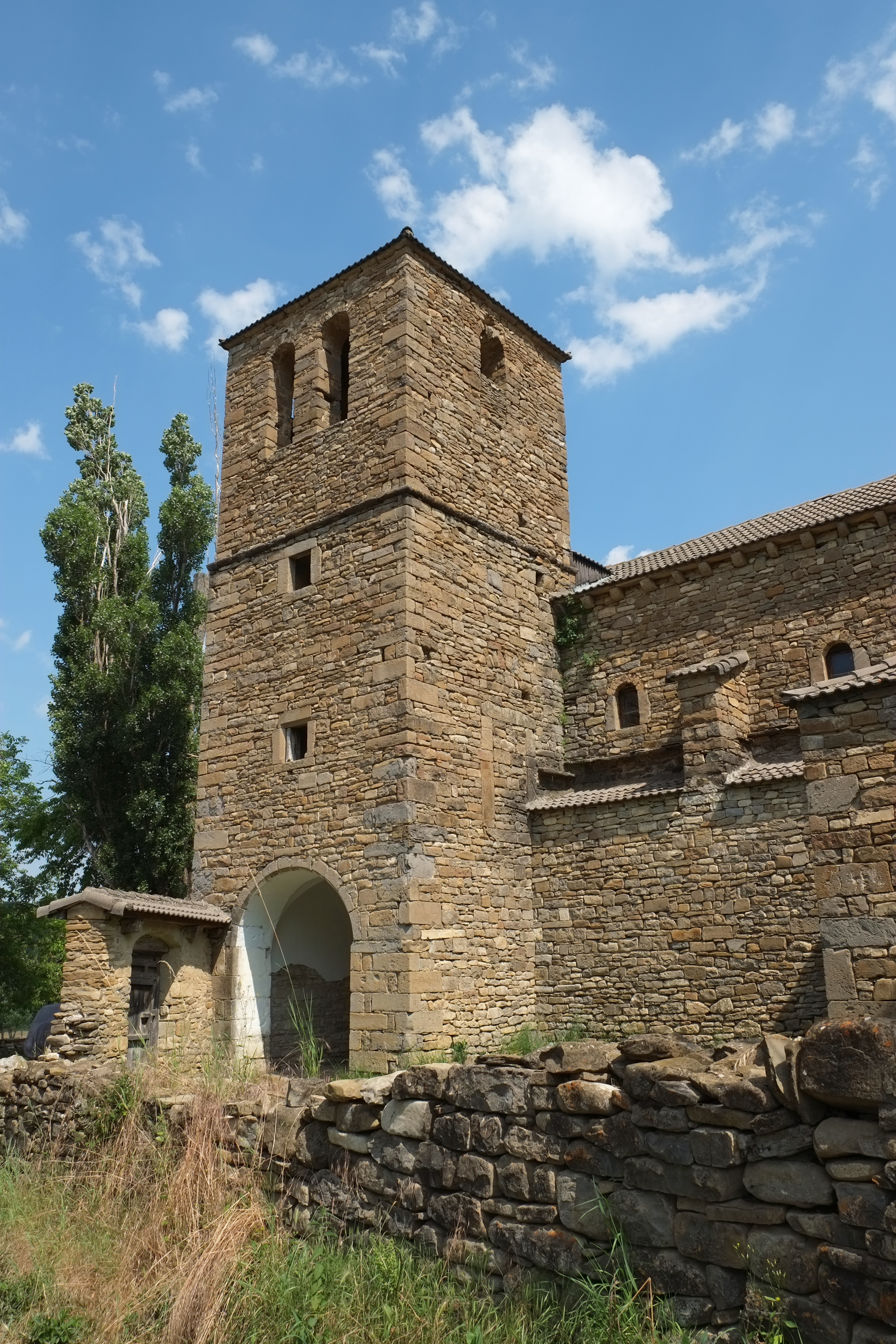

- Location within Aragon Location within Spain
- Coordinates: 42°32′11″N 0°18′59″W
- Country: Spain
- Autonomous community: Aragon
- Province: Province of Huesca
- Municipality: Biescas
- Elevation: 878 m (2,881 ft)

Population
  - Total: 15

Javierre del Obispo is a locality located in the municipality of Biescas, in Huesca province, Aragon, Spain. As of 2020, it has a population of 15.

== Geography ==
Javierre del Obispo is located 53km north of Huesca.
