= Balaïtous =

Mountain in France and Spain

Balaitus
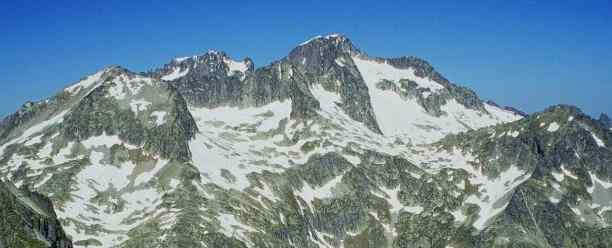
- Balaitus' summit

Highest point
- Elevation: 3,144 m (10,315 ft)
- Prominence: 849 m (2,785 ft)
- Listing: List of mountains in Aragon
- Coordinates: 42°50′19″N 00°17′24″W

Geography
- Location within Pyrenees
- Location: Hautes-Pyrénées, France; Alto Gállego, Aragon, Spain
- Parent range: Pyrenees

Climbing
- First ascent: August 8, 1825
- Easiest route: Las Neous glacier

The Balaitús (Spanish) or Pic du Balaïtous (French) (Aragonese: Pico Os Moros; Occitan: Vathleitosa) is a granitic massif of the Pyrenees, located right on the border between Spain and France.

== Geography ==
Balaitús marks the starting point of the High Pyrenees. Its height is 3,144 metres (10,315 ft) AMSL, and it is the nearest mountain to the Atlantic coast to surpass 3,000 metres (9,800 ft). Its name may come from the Occitan words "vath" (valley) and "leitosa" (milky). Another Spanish name for the mountain is Pico de los Moros (Moors' peak).

It separates the Spanish Tena Valley (Sallent de Gállego) from the French Val d'Azun.

== Climbing history ==
The first ascent of the peak was made in 1825 by French geodesic technicians Peytier and Hossard. The second ascent was made in 1864 by Charles Packe.

== Routes ==
There are several ascent routes to the summit, none of them are easy, mainly because of the vertical drop of 1,500 metres (4,900 ft) from all directions.

From France the most frequent route goes through Las Neous glacier starting from any of the refuges nearby: Larribet (2,060 m), Balaïtous (G. Ledormeur) (1,970 m) or Arrémoulit (2,305 m).

From Spain the route starts at La Sarra car park, near Sallent de Gállego, climbing via the Arriel lakes or the Respumoso lake.

== See also ==
- List of Pyrenean three-thousanders
