= Espierre =

- Locality
- Location within Aragon Location within Spain
- Coordinates: 42°36′2″N 0°17′15″W
- Country: Spain
- Autonomous community: Aragon
- Province: Province of Huesca
- Municipality: Biescas
- Elevation: 1,231 m (4,039 ft)

Population
  - Total: 3

Espierre is a locality in the municipality of Biescas, in Huesca province, Aragon, Spain. As of 2020, it has a population of three.

== Geography ==
Espierre is located 66 kilometres (41 mi) north-northeast of Huesca.
