= Sotonera Lacus =

Lake on Titan

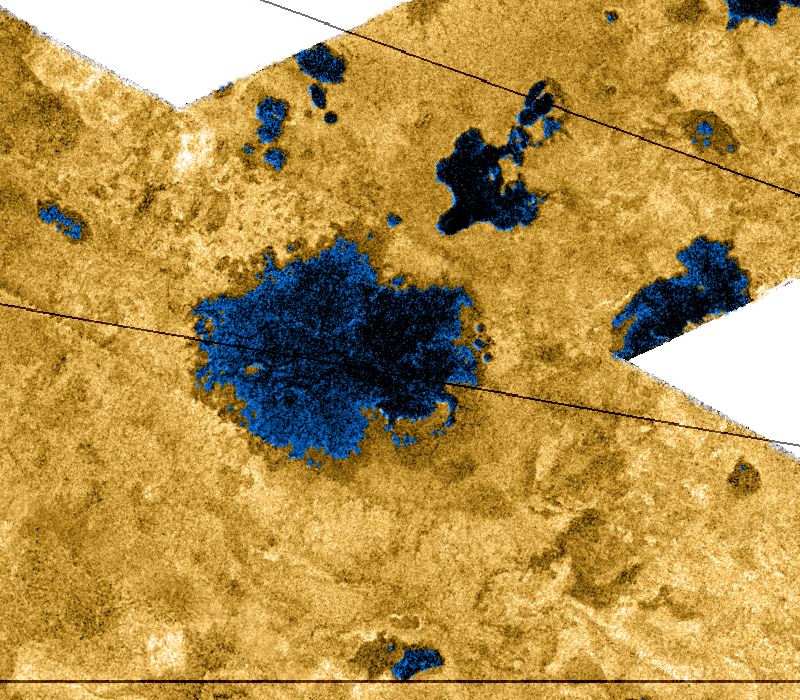
- False-color Cassini synthetic aperture radar image of hydrocarbon lakes on Titan. Bolsena Lacus is at center, with Sotonera Lacus to its upper right.
- Feature type: Lacus
- Coordinates: 76.75°N 17.49°W
- Diameter: 63 km (Note: The USGS web site gives the size as a "diameter", but it is actually the length in the longest dimension.)
- Eponym: Lake Sotonera

Sotonera Lacus is one of a number of hydrocarbon lakes found on Saturn's largest moon, Titan.

Sotonera Lacus is located near the north pole of Titan, centered on latitude 76.75°N and longitude 17.49°W, and measures 63 km in length. It is situated in a north polar region where most of Titan's large lakes are found.

The lake is composed of liquid methane and ethane, and was detected by the space probe Cassini. It was named in 2007 after Lake Sotonera in Spain.

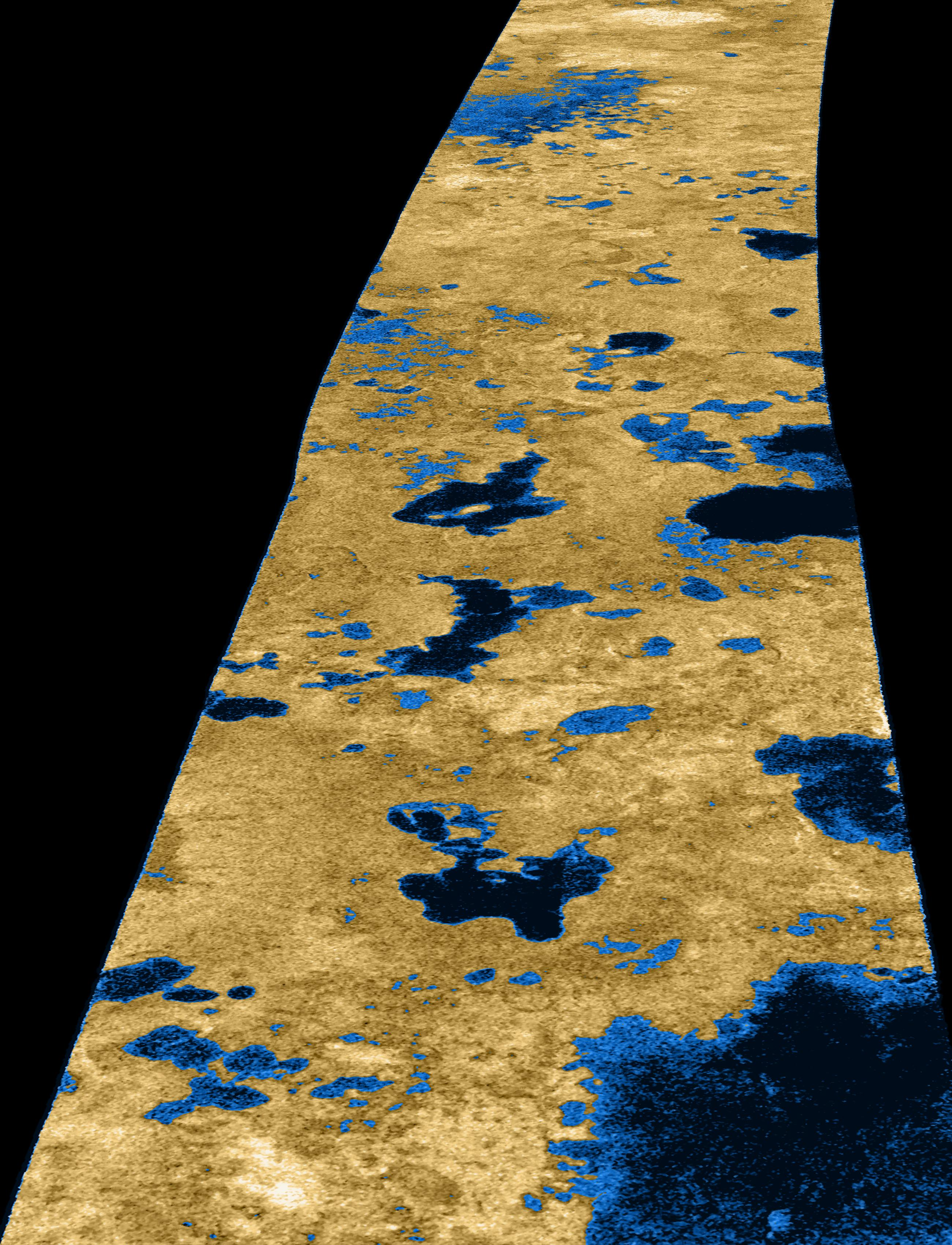
Sotonera mid foreground

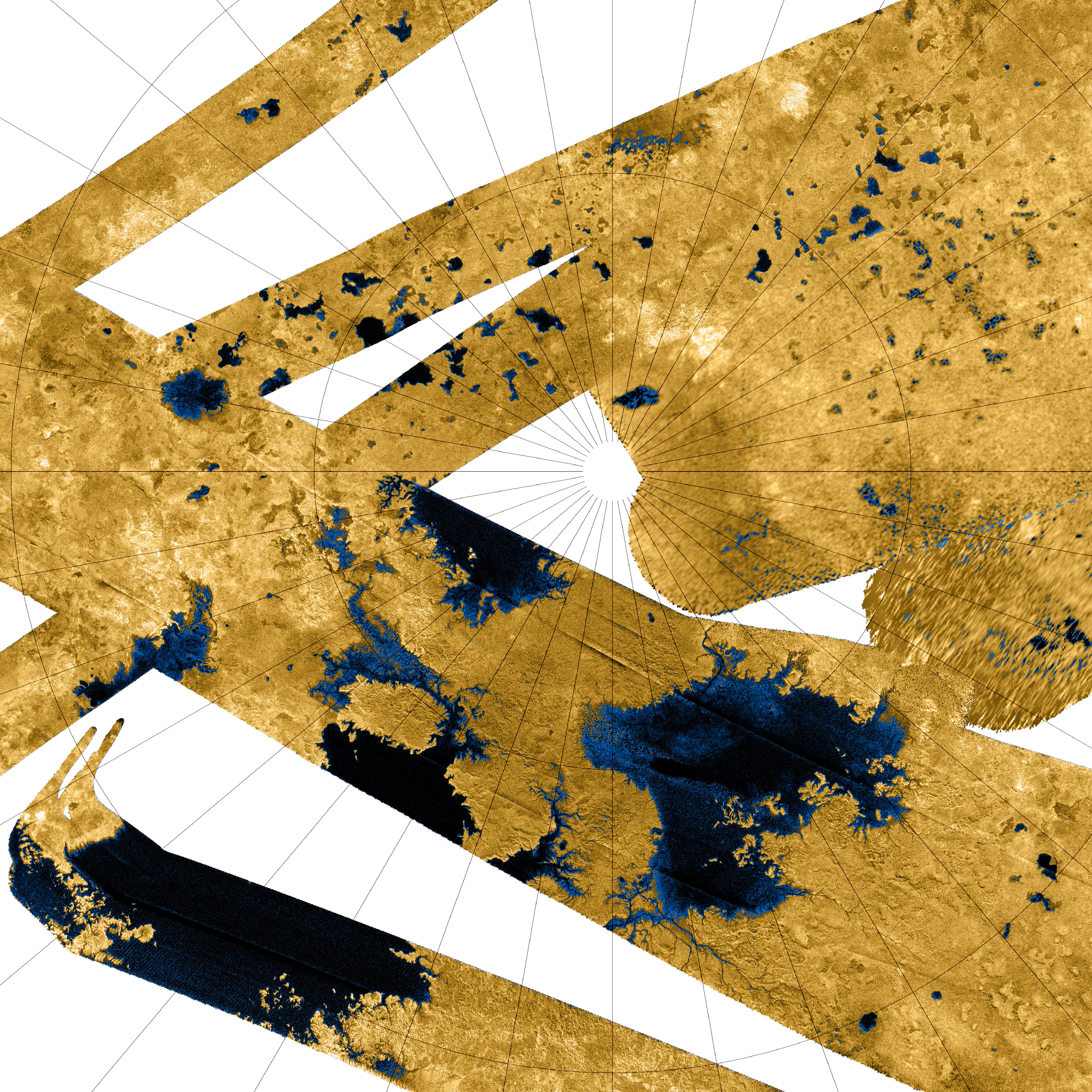
Lakes, including Sotonera

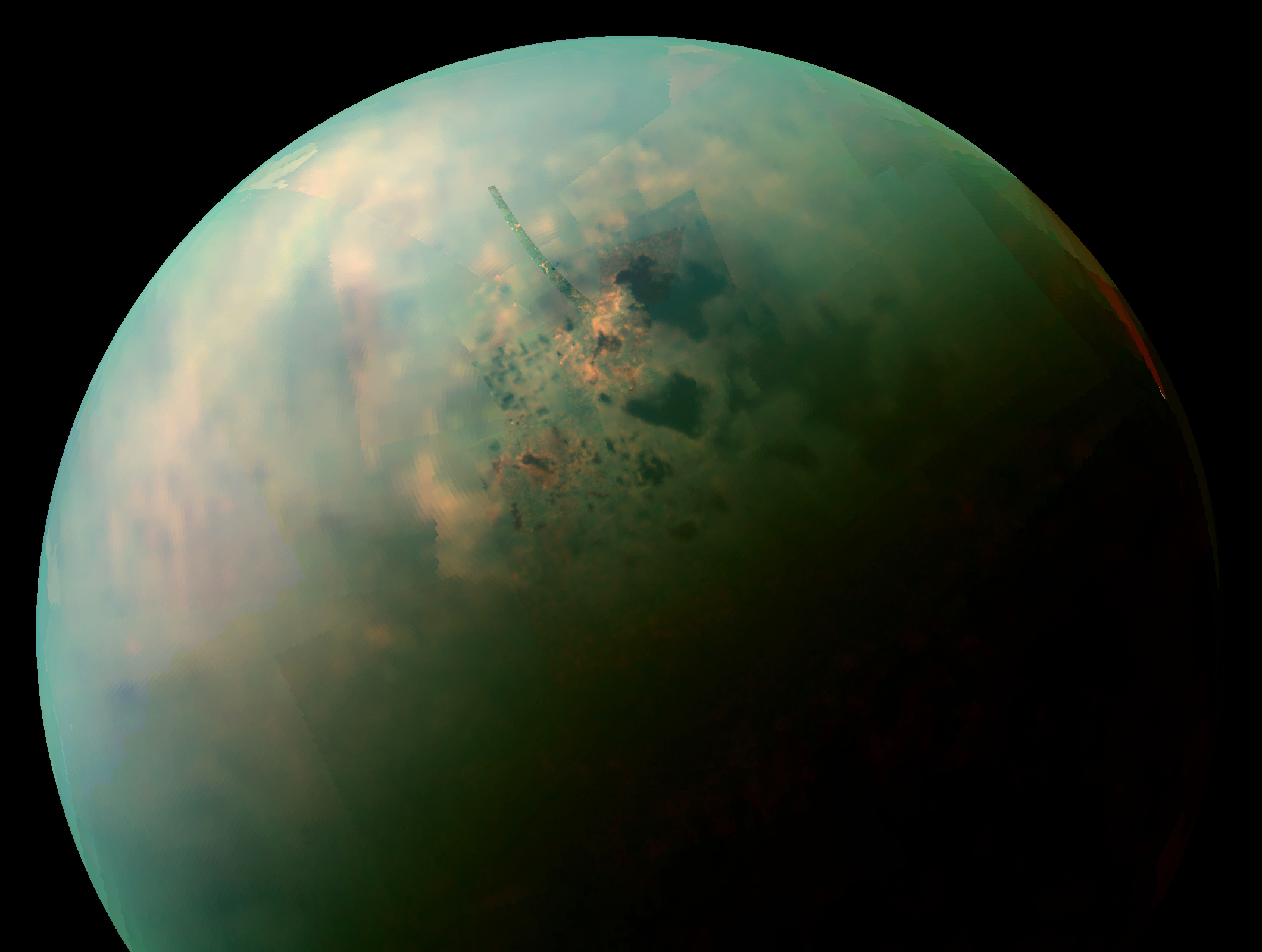
Titan northern hemisphere including Sotonera
