= Barbenuta =

Locality in Aragon, Spain

- Locality
- Interactive map of Barbenuta
- Coordinates: 42°35′50″N 0°17′46″W
- Country: Spain
- Autonomous commuity: Aragon
- Province: Huesca
- Municipality: Biescas

Population (2019) (INE)
  - Total: 6

Barbenuta (Spanish pronunciation: [bar'βenuta]) is a locality situated in the municipality of Biescas (Alto Gállego, Huesca, Aragon, Spain). In 2019, it had a population of 6 inhabitants.

Barbenuta was a standalone municipality in the 1842 census, until it was integrated into Yésero and later passed onto Berbusa. It was once again a standalone municipality in the 1920 census but was later integrated into Biescas.
