= Sotón river =

River in Spain

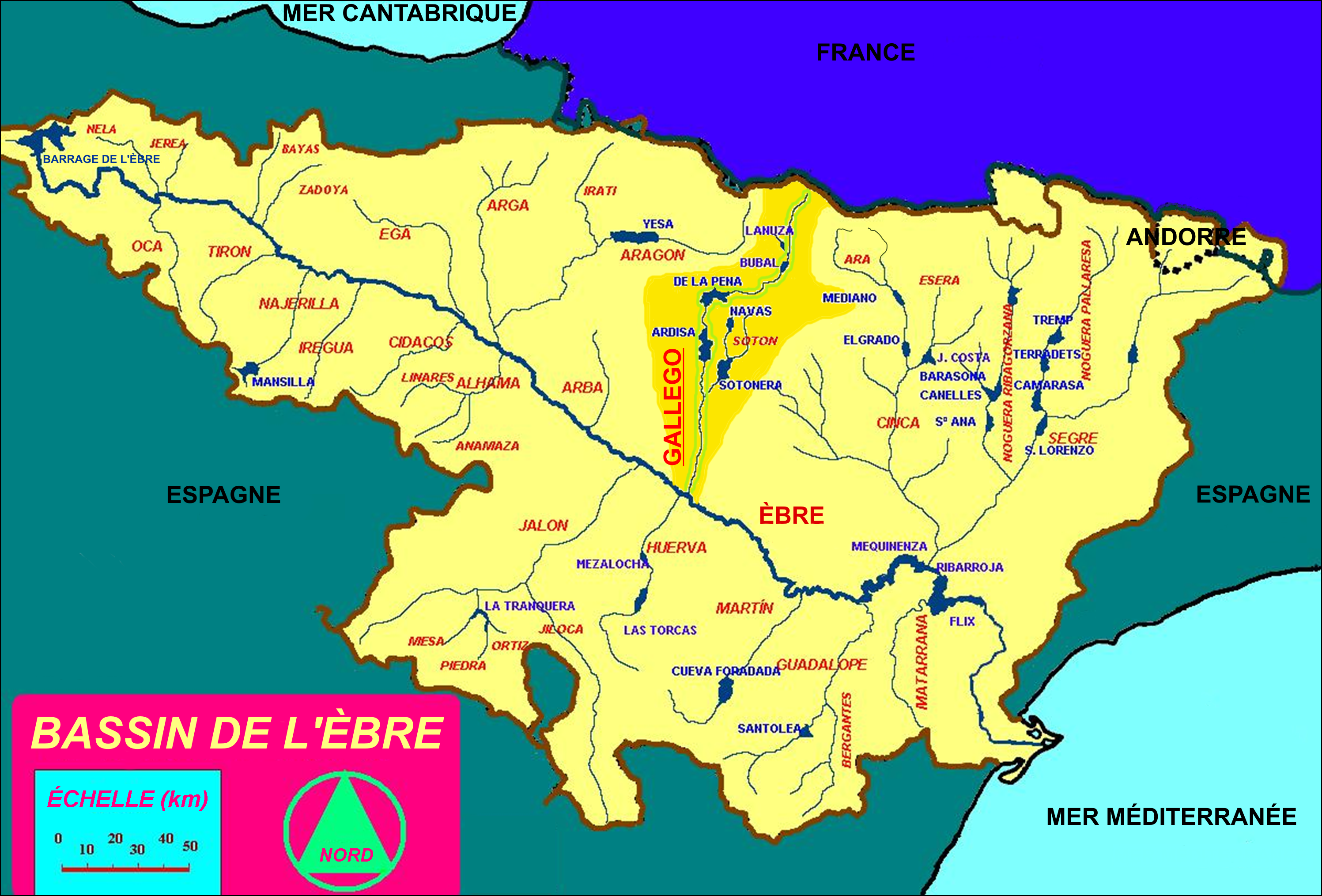
Sotón river Map.

The Sotón River is a river in Hoya de Huesca, municipality of Alcalá de Gurrea, Northern Spain.

The Sotón is a tributary of the Gállego River, in the Ebro River basin and has been dammed at Sotonera Dam.

== Sotonera reservoir ==
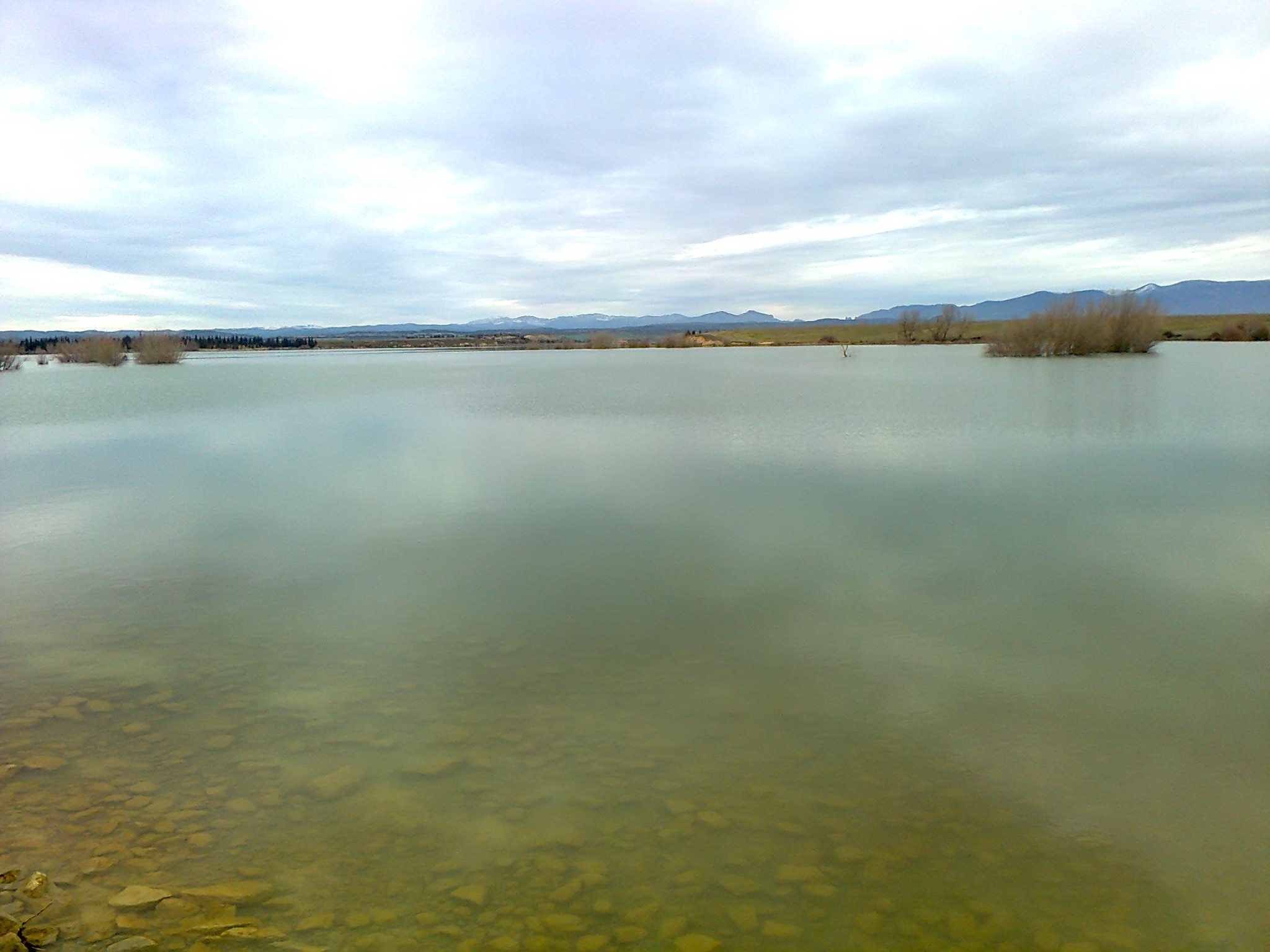
Sotonera Dam.

Sotonera reservoir is a lake on the Sotón river created by the damming of the river. The reservoir is the source of Monegros Canal.

The reservoir has become a habitat for aquatic birds, turtles, bivalves and has become a zone of interest, particularly for birds and is listed as an important habitat by the Spanish Ornithological Society since 1987 and the Government of Aragon.

Sotonera Lacus, a hydrocarbon lake on Titan, Saturn's moon, was named after the dam in 2007.

== See also ==
- List of rivers of Spain
