= Col du Pourtalet =

Mountain pass on the France–Spain border

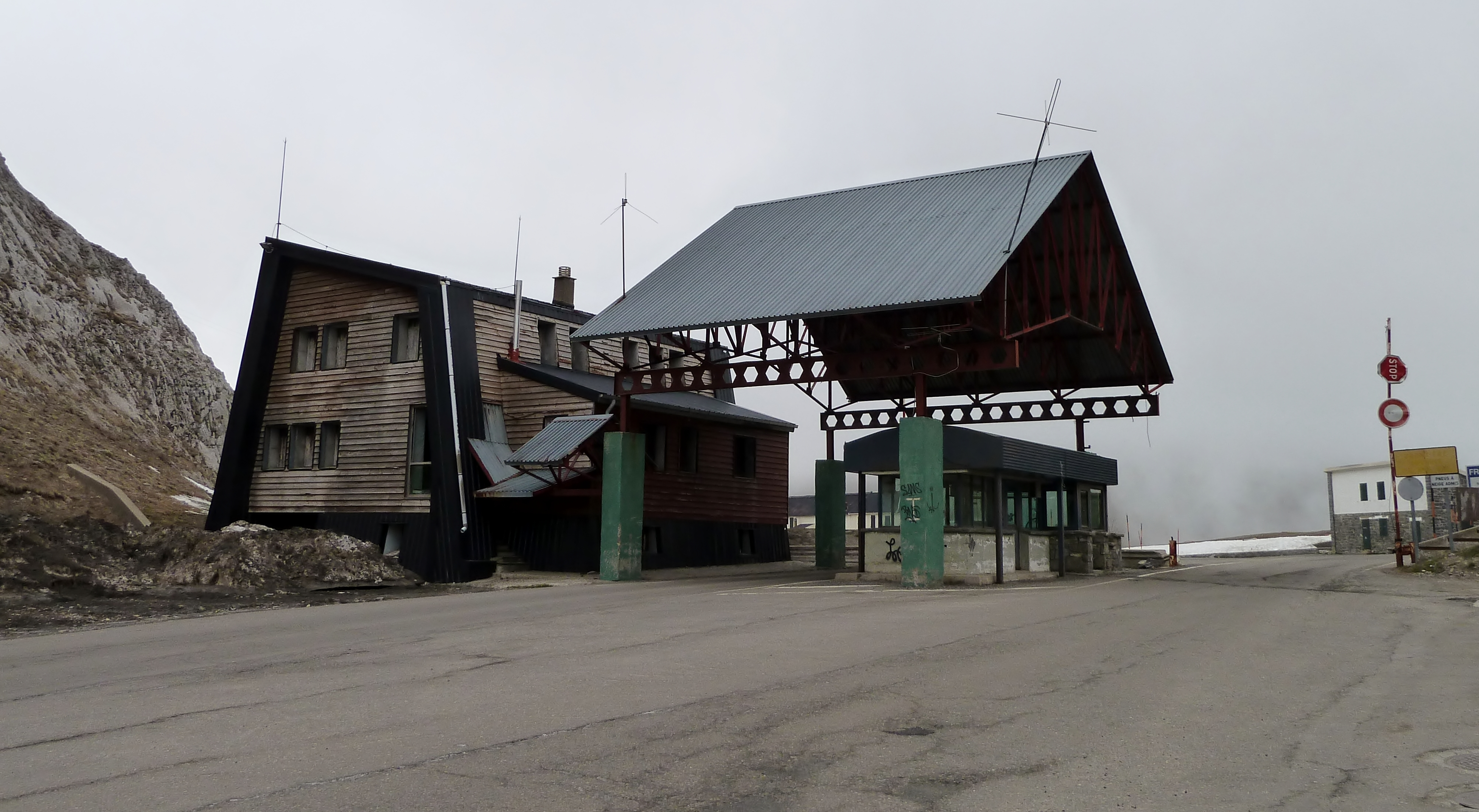
- The disused frontier post in April 2011

- Location within Pyrenees
- Elevation: 1,794 metres (5,886 ft)

Third Approach
- Location: Pyrénées-Atlantiques, Huesca, Spain; Laruns, Pyrénées-Atlantiques, France
- Range: Pyrenees
- Coordinates: 42°48′19″N 0°25′07″W

The Col du Pourtalet, El Portalet or Portalet d'Aneu is a mountain pass and border crossing in the Pyrenees, between France and Spain. The pass reaches an elevation of 1,794 m (5,886 ft), and links the Ossau and Tena valleys.

The road across the pass is known as the A-136 on the Spanish side, and links to Biescas and Huesca. On the French side the D934 road connects the pass to the towns of Laruns, Oloron-Sainte-Marie and Pau. The pass is kept open in the winter, but in case of heavy snowfall may be closed for a couple of days. Due to the Schengen Agreement, the checkpoint is not currently functional.

The French side of the pass falls within the commune of Laruns in the département of Pyrénées-Atlantiques, whilst the Spanish side is within the municipality of Sallent de Gállego within the province of Huesca.

== See also ==
- List of highest paved roads in Europe
- List of mountain passes
