= Orós Bajo =

Spanish locality

Orós Bajo Orós Baxo
- Population unit
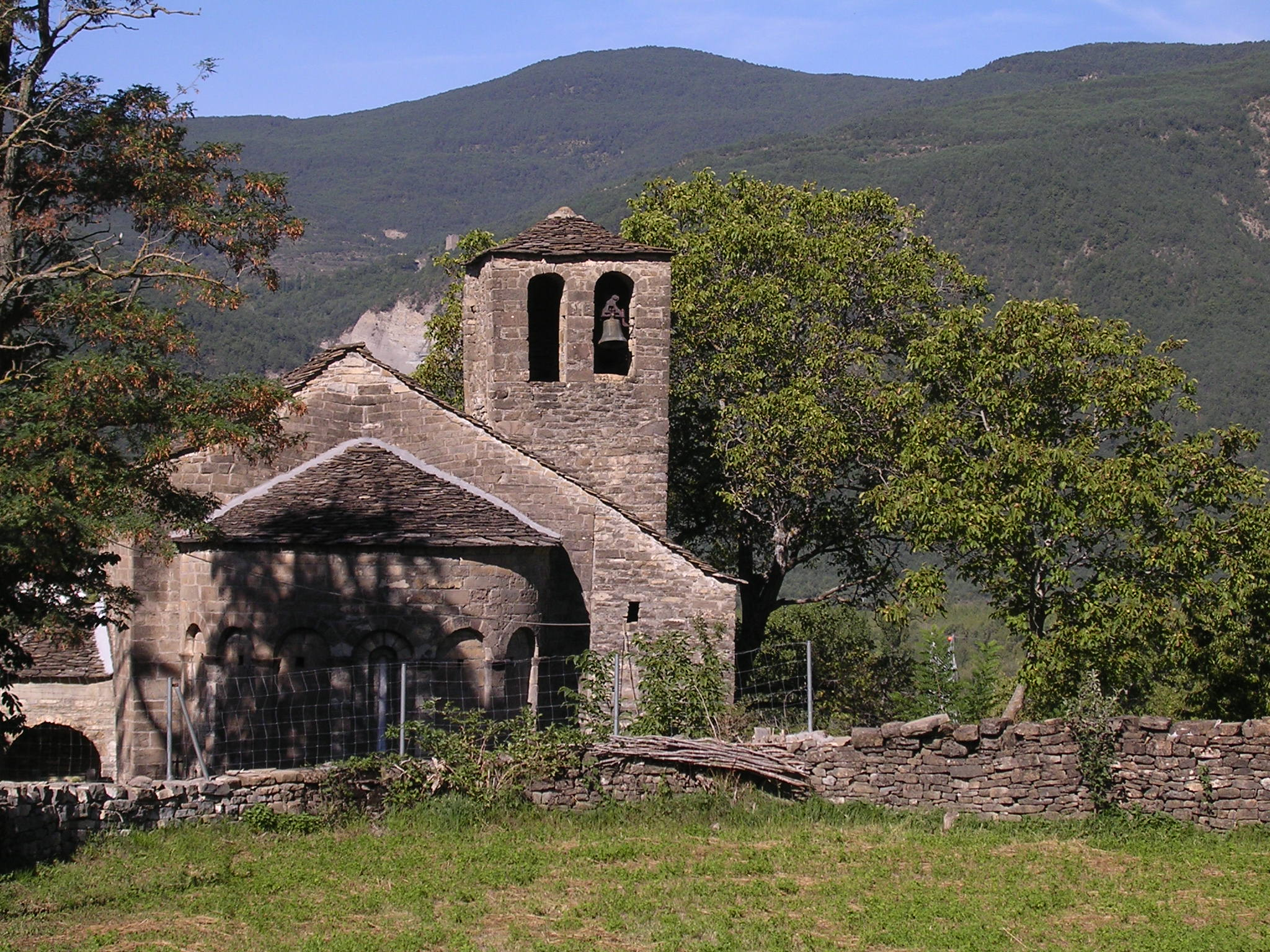
- The church of Saint Eulalia

- Location within Spain
- Coordinates: 42°35′31″N 0°18′36″W
- Autonomous community: Aragon
- Province: Huesca
- Municipality: Biescas

Population (2019)
  - Total: 22

Orós Bajo (Aragonese: Orós Baxo) is a population unit situated in the municipality of Biescas, Spain. In 2019, it had a population of 22 inhabitants.

== Monuments ==
The church of Saint Eulalia forms part of the Serrablo churches, a group of early-romanesque and mozarabic churches.
