= Betés de Sobremonte =

- Locality
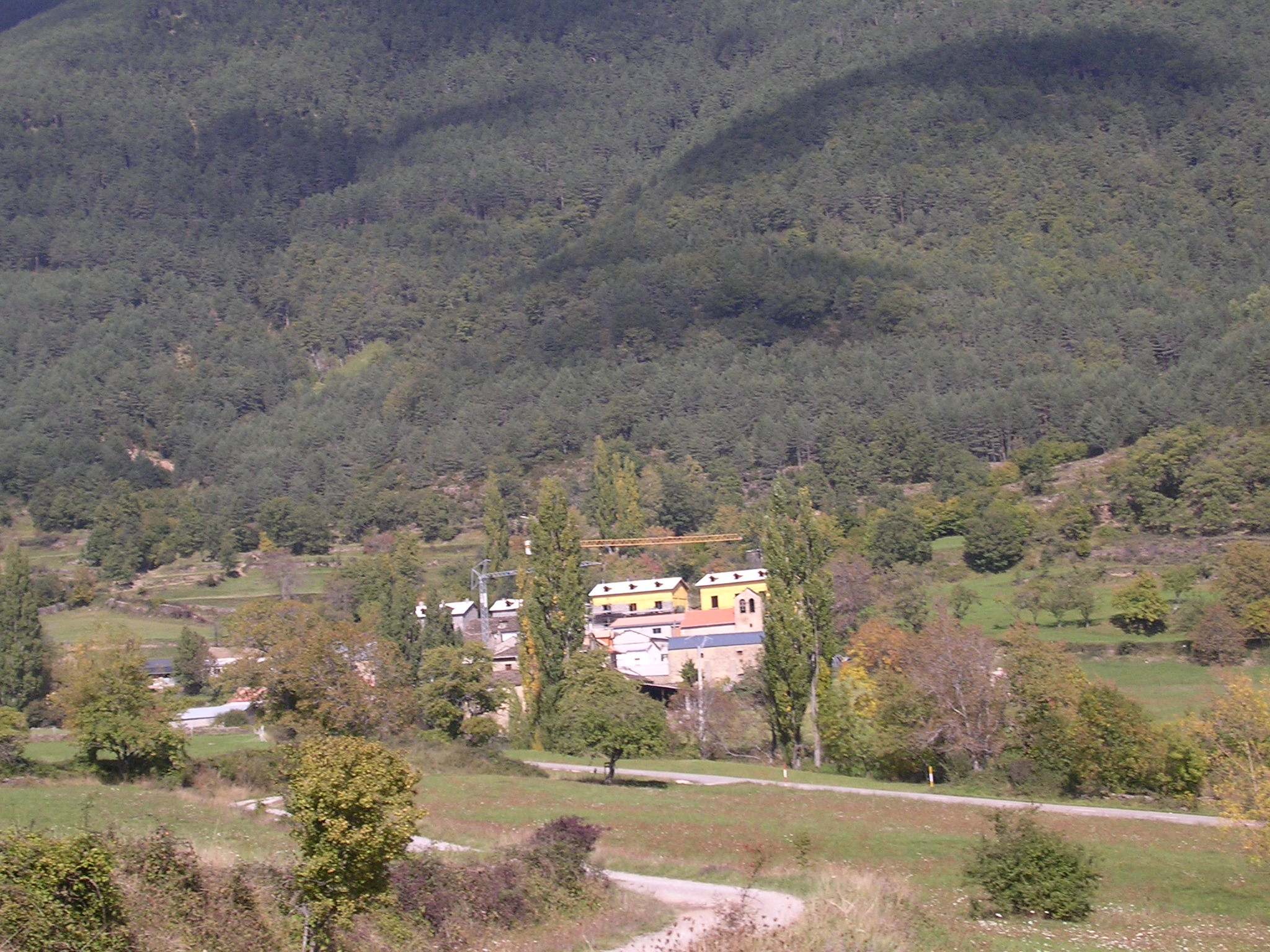

- Location within Aragon Location within Spain
- Coordinates: 42°38′5″N 0°20′54″W
- Country: Spain
- Autonomous community: Aragon
- Province: Province of Huesca
- Municipality: Biescas
- Elevation: 1,279 m (4,196 ft)

Population
  - Total: 12

Betés de Sobremonte is a locality located in the municipality of Biescas, in Huesca province, Aragon, Spain. As of 2020, it had a population of 12.

== Geography ==
Betés de Sobremonte is located 69km north of Huesca.

== History ==
The village is first mentioned in 1428, when it is granted to the monastery of San Juan de la Peña. Its history before that can only be inferred from the Valley of Tena, which it resides in.

In the 19th century, it was described as a small hamlet, containing seven houses. Its church was connected to the neighboring parish of Yosa de Sobremonte.
