= Oliván (Huesca) =

- Locality
- Location within Aragon Location within Spain
- Coordinates: 42°34′35″N 0°18′8″W
- Country: Spain
- Autonomous community: Aragon
- Province: Province of Huesca
- Municipality: Biescas
- Elevation: 911 m (2,989 ft)

Population
  - Total: 28

Oliván is a locality located in the municipality of Biescas, in Huesca province, Aragon, Spain. As of 2020, it has a population of 28.

== Geography ==
Oliván is located 61 km (38 mi) north of Huesca.
