= Sandiniés =

- Population unit
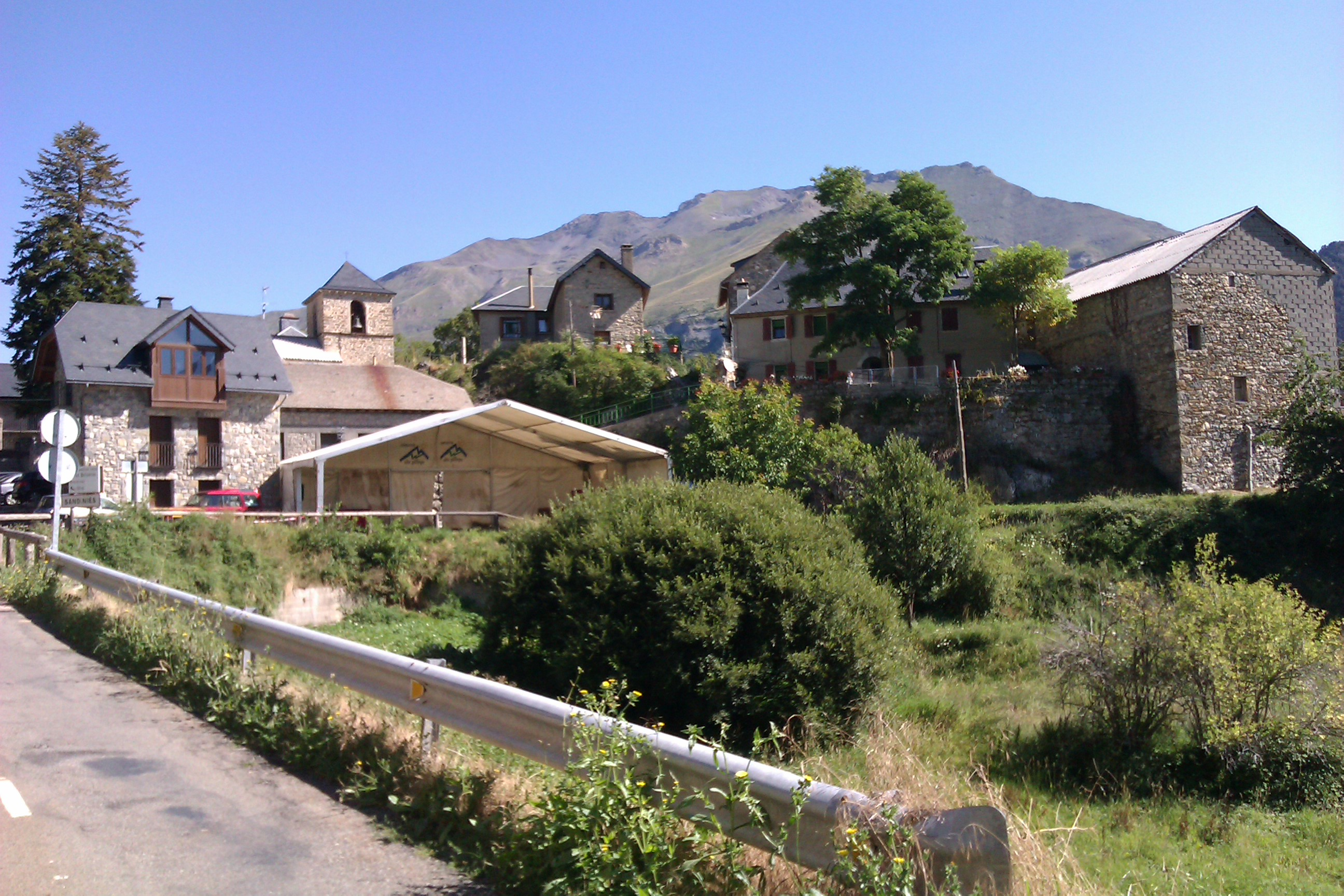

- Location within Spain
- Coordinates: 42°43′21″N 0°18′50″W

Population (2019)
  - Total: 54

Sandiniés (Spanish pronunciation: [sanði'ɲes]) is a population unit situated in the municipality of Sallent de Gállego (Alto Gállego, Huesca, Aragon, Spain). In 2019, it had a population of 54. It is located at 1294 metres of altitude.
