= Lanuza, Spain =

Populated location in Aragon, Spain

Lanuza
- Population unit
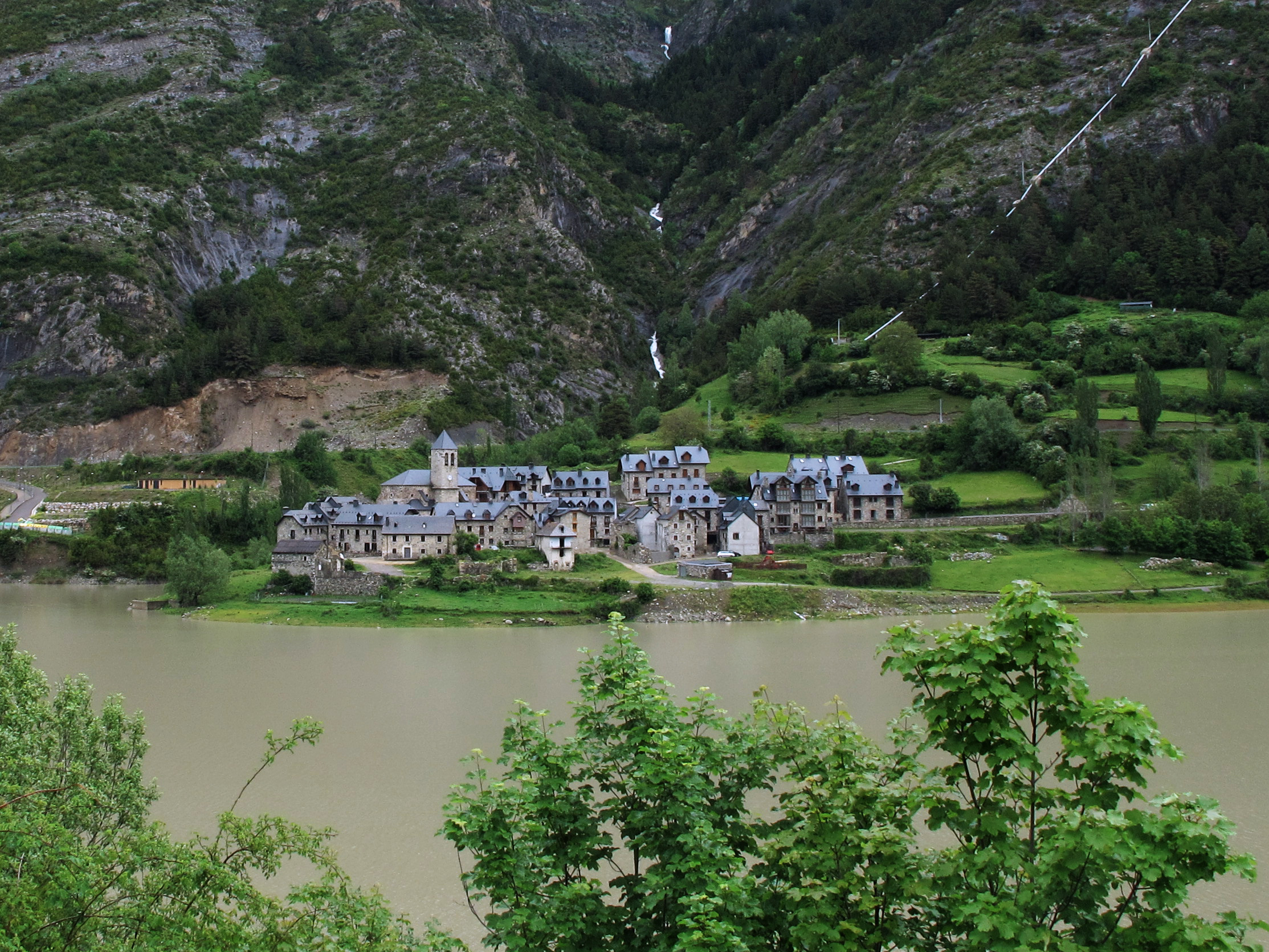
- Interactive map of Lanuza
- Coordinates: 42°35′57″N 0°24′16″W
- Country: Spain
- Autonomous community: Aragon
- Province: Huesca
- Municipality: Sallent de Gállego

Lanuza is a populated place belonging to the Spanish municipality of Sallent de Gállego, in the province of Huesca, Aragon.

It is a Pyrenean village lying on the left bank of the Gállego river. The inhabitants were forced to leave in 1978 in order to create a water reservoir that was projected to flood the town. Consequently, Lanuza was stripped of its municipality status and the land was incorporated as part of Sallent de Gállego. The projections that the town would be destroyed entirely, however, proved inaccurate, as only some of the buildings ended up underwater. Former residents that had been forced to leave campaigned to return to and rebuild Lanuza in the 1990s, and the town has since been repopulated. The town is visited by tourists year-round, particularly during the summer.
