= Biescas =

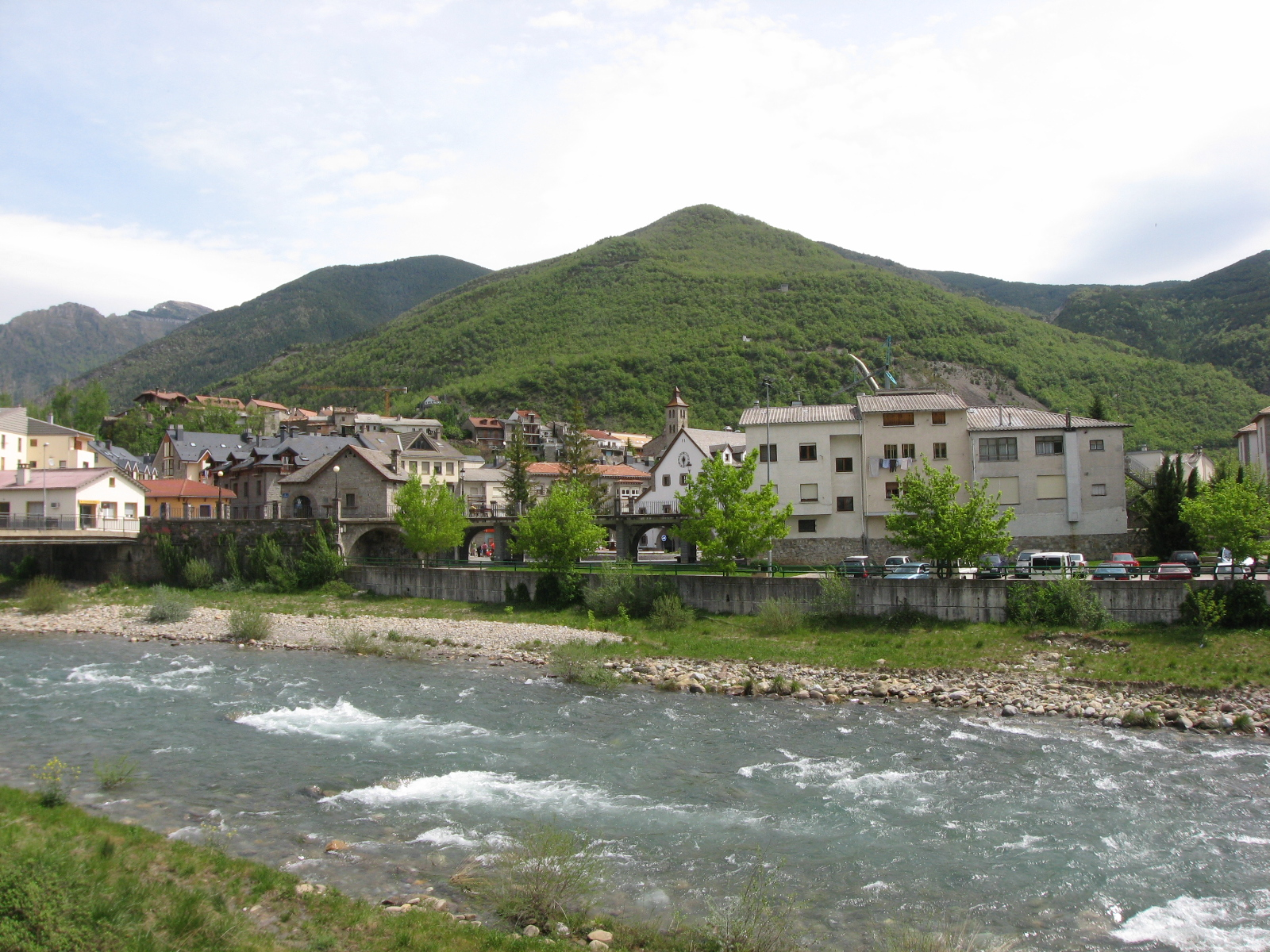
- Town of Biescas.

- Flag Coat of arms

- Location in Spain
- Coordinates: 42°37′42″N 0°19′16″W
- Country: Spain
- Autonomous community: Aragon
- Province: Huesca
- Comarca: Alto Gállego

Government
  - Mayor: Luís Estaún García

Area
  - Total: 18,909 km^{2} (7,301 sq mi)
- Elevation: 875 m (2,871 ft)

Population (2025-01-01)
  - Total: 1,640
  - Density: 0.0867/km^{2} (0.225/sq mi)
- Time zone: UTC+1 (CET)
  - Summer (DST): UTC+2 (CET)

Biescas (Spanish pronunciation: [ˈbjeskas]) is a municipality of northeastern Spain close to the border with France, in the midst of the Pyrenees in the province of Huesca. The name seems to provide from the term bizka, which means "hill" in a Proto-Indo-European language.

The town of Biescas is located at 875 meters altitude on the banks of the Gállego river. The municipality extends along a small plain and includes the canyon to access to the Tena Valley. At 72 km north of the main city Huesca, Biescas is a communication hub between the regions of Jacetania and Sobrarbe. The town is strategically located to crossing the Gállego river, as a link between the valleys of Tena and Ara.

== Demography and population entities ==
The municipality extends over an area of 189.09 km^{2}. Distributing the town main parallel to the river, with two areas of different altitude delimiting two historic districts: to the west, the district of San Pedro, which includes an area for expansion and new constructions, and eastern district of San Salvador split, itself, into the neighborhood of La Peña (The Rock) and the Downtown, where are located the administration and most of the services and shops in the village.

According to the Spanish Statistics National Institute, the current municipality has 1,535 inhabitants and includes the villages of:

Village	Inhabitants (2014)
Biescas	1163
Aso de Sobremonte	29
Barbenuta	9
Betés de Sobremonte	14
Escuer	36
Espierre	5
Gavín	89
Javierre del Obispo	17
Oliván	37
Orós Alto	23
Orós Bajo	20
Piedrafita de Jaca	56
Yosa de Sobremonte	37

The municipality also includes the depopulated villages of Búbal, Polituara, Saquès, Ainielle, Susín, Berbusa and Casbas.

== Economy ==
The economic activities in Biescas have historically been traditional farming of cereals and of fodder for livestock, logging of forests, and bovine cattle and sheep for local consumption. At the beginning of the twentieth century, Biescas highlighted in the region for its wool traditional textile industry, specialized in blankets and equipment for horses.

Since the beginning of the 1990s, tourism has replaced the traditional economy of the town. Residents have been gradually leaving farming and agriculture to engage in construction and services. Currently Biescas constitutes an important touristic point in the central Pyrenees, both in summer and winter.

== History ==
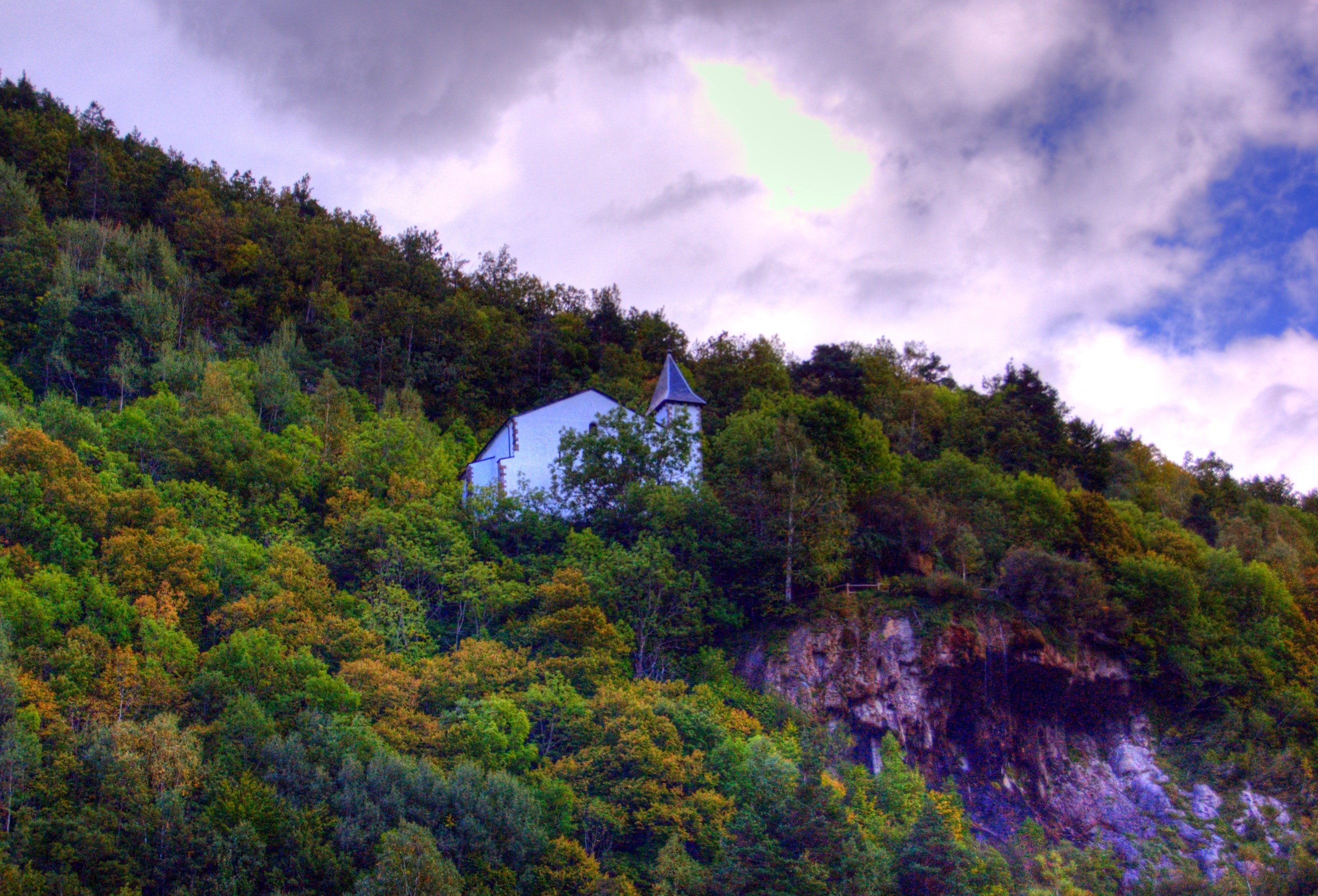
Hermitage of Santa Elena and The Glorious source in Biescas

The oldest pieces of evidence from human presence in the Biescas municipality are Neolithic cists from the plain of Santa Engracia, which are estimated to be from the III millennium BC. One of them has been restored.

Biescas began to form as a village in the Middle Ages, given its strategic location as a crossroads. The first document of its existence is a citation in the Cartulary of San Juan de la Peña, between 1020 and 1030 AC. In a document of 1391 it appears cited with the name of Biescas Sobirón.

Military fort in Santa Elena, ordered by King Philip II

Biescas has always been a town endowed with royal privileges and had two ecclesiastical parishes: San Salvador and San Pedro. Although in the old ages it also had two other temples, the San Torcuato and St. Stephen churches. It is also documented that the hermitage of Santa Elena was reconstructed by King James I in 1253 and endowed with privileges by King Ferdinand in 1484 and King Charles V in 1525.

In the sixteenth century, King Philip II ordered to fortify the Santa Elena canyon to protect his kingdoms of possible threats from beyond the Pyrenees. To this end, The Castle of San Pedro was built in neighboring Jaca together with other defenses still visible in the valleys of the Aragon and Gállego rivers. In this context, on 6 and 7 February 1592 eight hundred people from Béarn invaded and occupied Biescas and the Tena Valley for eleven days, before being defeated in the Gorge of Lutherans battle.

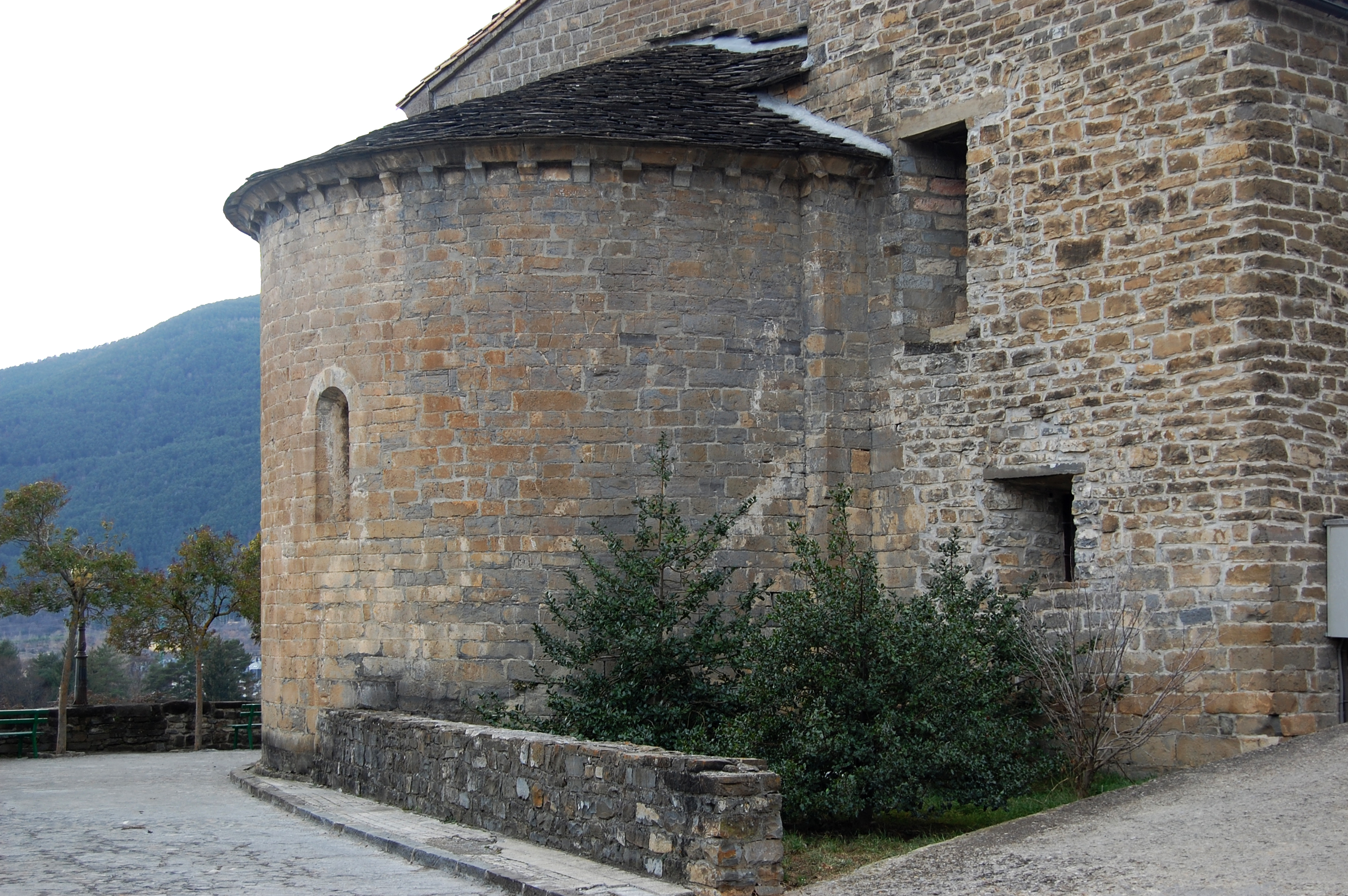
Romanesque apse of San Salvador church in Biescas

During the Spanish Civil War (1936-1939) Biescas was almost razed. At the beginning of the conflict the town was quickly conquered by the rebel side and was involved in the Battle of Sabiñánigo, between September and November 1937. In this battle the 43rd and 27th divisions of the army of the Spanish Second Republic launched an offensive against the rebels, specifically against the I brigade of the 51st National Division and local volunteers such as the Valley Tena Panthers. Biescas was recovered by Republican troops at the beginning of the offensive. It is estimated that during the course of the Battle of Sabiñánigo, the total number of deaths (soldiers and civilians) was around 6,000 people.

On 7 August 1996, 86 people died due to a flood in Las Nieves camping.

== Main sights ==
- Church of San Salvador. It was built around the year 1200 and was destroyed in the cir of 1936 and later rebuilt. However, the main body of the church still has the original romanesque semicircular apse and chancel.

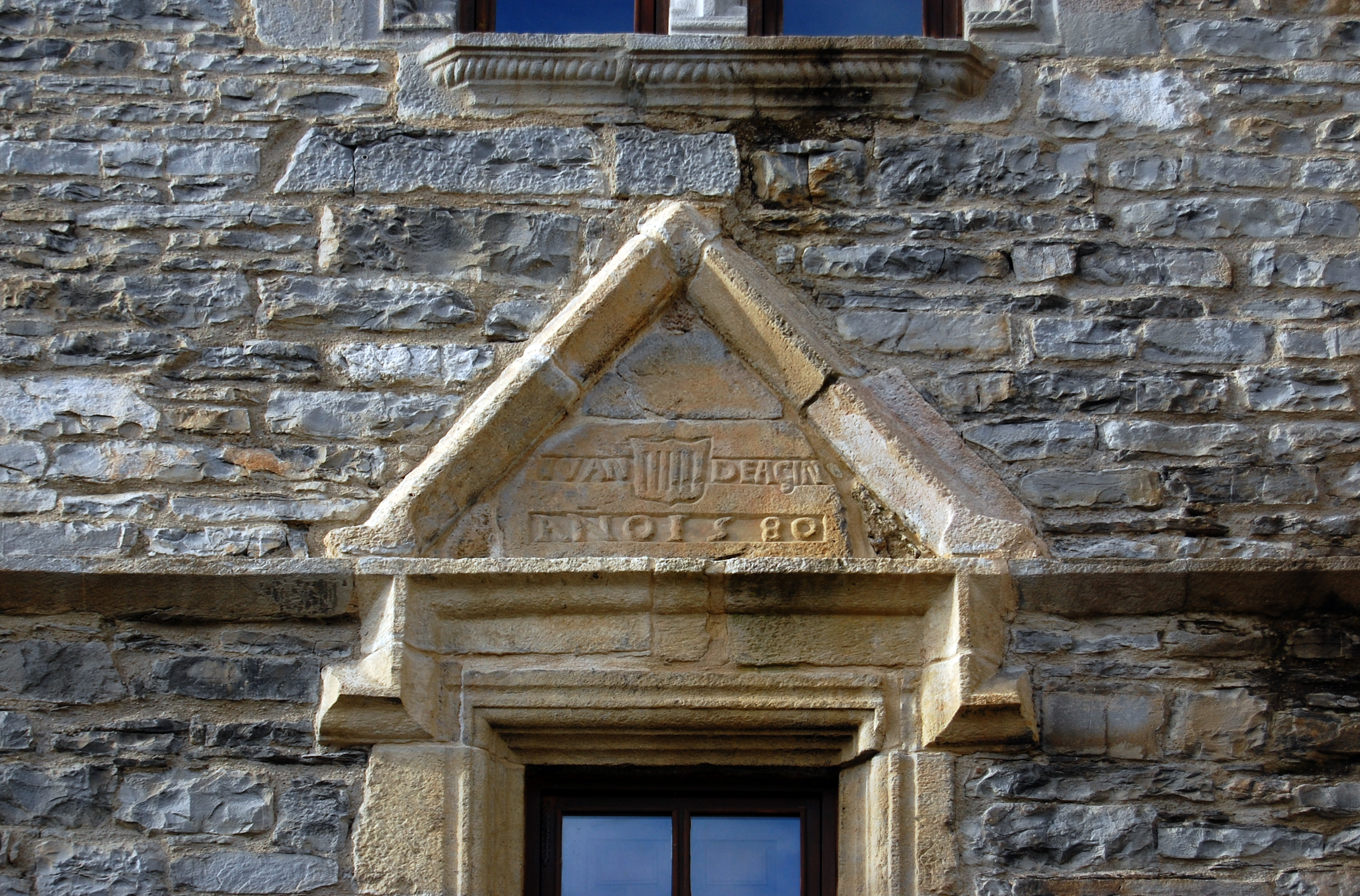
Window of Torraza dels Acín in Biescas

- Hermitage of Santa Elena. The current temple was built in the seventeenth century over the River Gallego to the entrance of the Tena Valley, at 5 km from the town center. It stands in the forest with its head built in a cave, next to an intermittent source called The Glorious

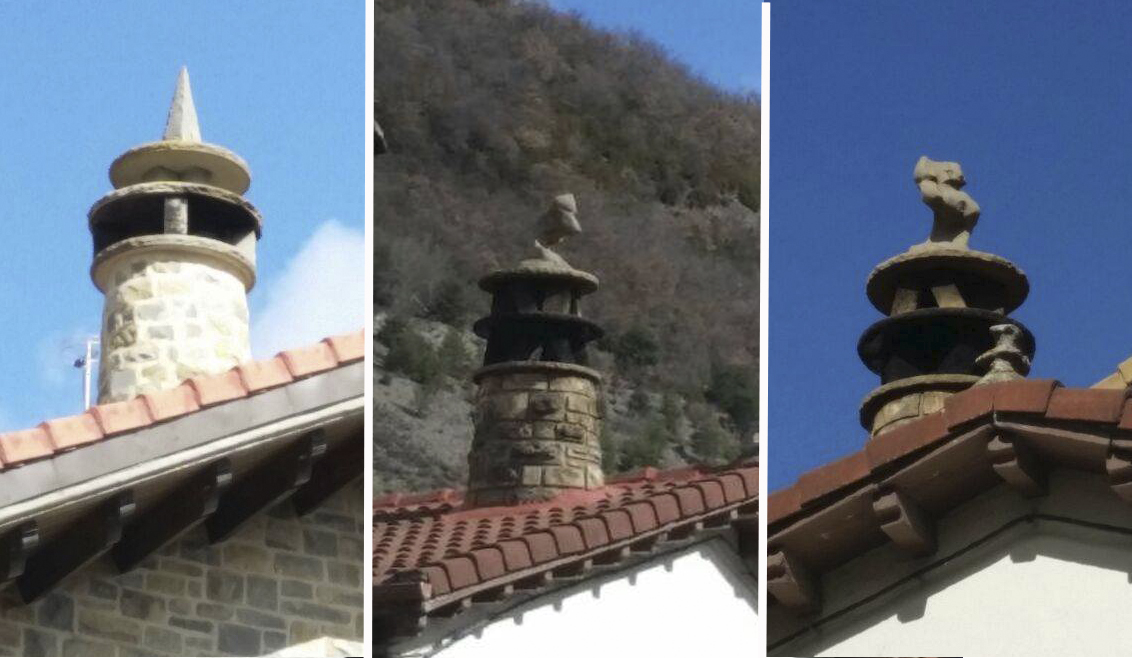
Examples of scarewitches on chimneys in Biescas

- Torraza de los Acín. At the town center, it stands a medieval military housing now converted into a museum. This fortified house was built in 1580 by the Hidalgo Juan de Acín as a symbol of his economic and social position. It is a stone building, a magnificent representative of the local architecture of that time.
- Chimneys. In Biescas you can see good examples of popular Pyrenean architecture, excelling its balconies and also its chimneys with a conical frustum shape. The latter are characteristic of the traditional buildings of the Aragonese Pyrenees. Some of them present peculiar ornaments known as espantabrujas (scarewitches) with supposed protective actions.

== Sport ==
- Fernando Escartín (born January 24, 1968, Biescas) is a retired professional road racing cyclist. In his resume stands out the victory in the Volta a Catalunya in 1997 and third overall in the 1999 Tour de France.
- The football team U.D. Biescas plays in the 3rd Spanish division. They play their matches on the Fernando Escartín football pitch in honour of the cyclist Fernando Escartín.

== Sister cities – international relations ==
Town	State/Region	Country
Arthez-de-Béarn	Occitania	France

== See also ==
- Fernando Escartín
- Tena Valley
- Alto Gállego
- List of municipalities in Huesca
