= Escarrilla =

- Locality
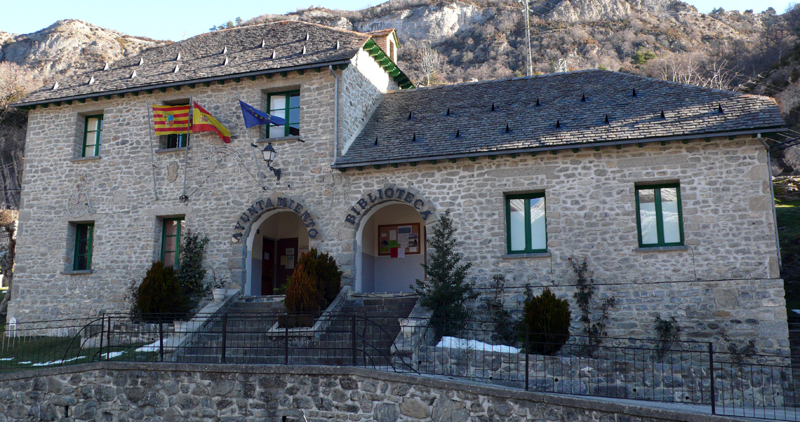

- Location within Aragon Location within Spain
- Coordinates: 42°44′13″N 0°18′49″W
- Country: Spain
- Autonomous community: Aragon
- Province: Province of Huesca
- Municipality: Sallent de Gállego
- Elevation: 1,171 m (3,842 ft)

Population
  - Total: 202

Escarrilla is a locality located in the municipality of Sallent de Gállego, in Huesca province, Aragon, Spain. As of 2020, it has a population of 202.

== Geography ==
Escarrilla is located 78km north of Huesca.
