= Gavin =

- Pronunciation: /ˈɡævɪn/ GAV-in
- Gender: Masculine

Origin
- Origin: Primarily Scotland other Celtic nations
- Meaning: 'God-send', 'white hawk'

Other names
- Related names: Gawain

Gavin is a Celtic male given name. It is the Scottish variation of the medieval Welsh name Gawain, meaning 'God send' or 'white hawk/falcon'. Sir Gawain is a knight of King Arthur's Round Table. Sir Gawain and the Green Knight is an epic poem in which he beheads the Green Knight, who promptly replaces his head and threatens Gawain an identical fate the same time next year. Decapitation figures elsewhere: the Italian (and originally Sardinian) name Gavino is the name of an early Christian martyr (San Gavino, Porto Torres, Sardinia) who was beheaded in 300 AD, his head being thrown in the Mediterranean Sea, later recovered and interred with his body.

== People with the given name ==
- Gavin Adcock (born 1998), American singer and songwriter
- Gavin Affleck (born 1958), Canadian architect
- Gavin Allen (born 1965), Australian rugby league player
- Gavin Andresen (born 1966), American software developer
- Gavin Andrews (born 1931), Australian academic and psychiatrist
- Gavin Annandale (born 1989), South African rugby union player
- Gavin Arneil (1923–2018), Scottish paediatric nephrologist
- Gavin Arroyo (born 1972), American water polo player
- Gavin Arthur (1901–1972), American astrologer and sexologist
- Gavin Ashenden (born 1954), English Cathollc convert; former Anglican priest
- Gavin Astor, 2nd Baron Astor of Hever (1918–1984), English soldier and publisher
- Gavin Baddeley, British author and journalist
- Gavin Badger (born 1972), Australian rugby league referee
- Gavin Baker (born 1988), English cricketer
- Gavin Bartholomew (born 2003), American football player
- Gavin Barwell (born 1972), English politician
- Gavin Bayes (born 1965), Australian rules footballer
- Gavin Bayreuther (born 1994), American ice hockey player
- Gavin Bazunu (born 2002), Irish soccer player
- Gavin Becker (born 1999), American actor, singer, and songwriter
- Gavin Beith (born 1981), Scottish footballer
- Gavin Bellis (born 1973), Australian rower
- Gavin Bennion (born 1993), English rugby league player
- Gavin Bishop (born 1946), New Zealand writer and illustrator
- Gavin Blackburn, Scottish rugby union player
- Gavin Bland (born 1971), English fell runner
- Gavin Blyth (1969–2010), English television producer and journalist
- Gavin Bone (born 1964), English writer
- Gavin Bornholdt (1947–2011), New Zealand sailor
- Gavin Bottger (born 2007), American skateboarder
- Gavin Bradley, Canadian singer, songwriter, and record producer
- Gavin Brady (born 1973), New Zealand sailor
- Gavin Brennan (born 1988), Irish footballer
- Gavin Briant (born 1969), Zimbabwean cricketer
- Gavin Bridson (1936–2008), English bibliographer and librarian
- Gavin Brindley (born 2004), American ice hockey player
- Gavin Broder (born 1959), Irish rabbi
- Gavin Bryars (born 1943), English composer and double bassist
- Gavin Buckley (born 1963), Australian–American politician
- Gavin Butt (born 1967), English academic and writer
- Gavin Byram (born 1974), English cricketer
- Gavin Cadwallader (born 1986), English footballer
- Gavin Caines (born 1983), English footballer
- Gavin Carr, British conductor and opera singer
- Gavin Carragher (born 1933), Australian sprinter
- Gavin Casalegno (born 1999), American actor
- Gavin Castleton, American musician
- Gavin Cattle (born 1980), Welsh rugby union player
- Gavin Cecchini (born 1993), American baseball player
- Gavin Christie (born 1981), Bahamian soccer player
- Gavin Christopher (1949–2016), American singer and musician
- Gavin Clark (1969–2015), English musician, singer, and songwriter
- Gavin Claxton (born 1966), English filmmaker and television producer
- Gavin Clinch (born 1974), Australian rugby league player
- Gavin Coles (born 1968), Australian golfer
- Gavin Collins (born 1966), British Anglican bishop
- Gavin Coombes (born 1997), Irish rugby union player
- Gavin Cooper (born 1985), Australian rugby league player
- Gavin Crawford (born 1971), Canadian comedian and actor
- Gavin Crawford (footballer) (1869–1955), Scottish footballer
- Gavin Creel (1976–2024), American actor, singer, and songwriter
- Gavin Cromwell (born 1974), Irish racehorse trainer
- Gavin Cronje (born 1979), South African racing driver
- Gavin E. Crooks, English chemist
- Gavin Crosisca (born 1968), Australian rules footballer
- Gavin Dacey (born 1984), Welsh rugby union player
- Gavin Dalzell, 2nd Earl of Carnwath (1627−1674), Scottish nobleman
- Gavin Davis (born 1977), South African politician
- Gavin D'Costa (born 1958), Kenyan–born English professor
- Gavin DeBartolo (born 1982), Australian rugby union player
- Gavin de Becker (born 1954), American writer
- Gavin de Beer (1899–1972), British evolutionary embryologist
- Gavin DeGraw (born 1977), American musician, singer, and songwriter
- Gavin Dein, British entrepreneur and philanthropist
- Gavin Delahunty, Irish curator
- Gavin Devlin, Northern Irish Gaelic footballer
- Gavin Dew (born 1984), Canadian politician
- Gavin Geoffrey Dillard (born 1954), American poet and songwriter
- Gavin Dodd (born 1982), English rugby league player
- Gavin Douglas (c. 1474–1522), Scottish bishop and translator
- Gavin Downie (1924–1998), New Zealand politician
- Gavin Escobar (1991–2022), American football player
- Gavin Esler (born 1953), Scottish journalist, writer, and television presenter
- Gavin Evans (born 1984), Welsh rugby union player
- Gavin Ewart (1916–1995), English poet
- Gavin Ewing (born 1981), Zimbabwean cricketer
- Gavin Exell (born 1962), Australian rules footballer
- Gavin Extence (born 1982), English writer
- Gavin Fernandes, Canadian re-recording mixer
- Gavin Ferreira, Indian field hockey player
- Gavin Fien (born 2007), American baseball player
- Gavin Fingleson (born 1976), South African–born Australian baseball player
- Gavin Fink (born 1992), American actor
- Gavin Fisher (born 1964), British mechanical engineer
- Gavin Fleming (1826–1890), Canadian merchant and politician
- Gavin Fletcher (born 1941), Scottish footballer
- Gavin Flood (born 1954), British scholar
- Gavin Floyd (born 1983), American baseball player
- Gavin Forsyth (born 1969), English alpine skier
- Gavin Francis (born 1975), Scottish physician and writer
- Gavin Franklin (born 1978), English cricketer
- Gavin Fraser (born 1972), English–born Scottish rugby union player
- Gavin Free (born 1988), English actor, filmmaker, cinematographer, and internet personality
- Gavin Friday (born 1959), Irish musician, singer, and songwriter
- Gavin Friels (born 1977), Scottish footballer
- Gavin Fryer, British philatelist
- Gavin F. Gardner (1848–1919), Australian stockbroker
- Gavin Garrison (born 1987), American television producer
- Gavin Geddes (born 1972), English soccer player
- Gavin George (born 2003), American pianist
- Gavin Gibb (c.1750 – 1831), Scottish minister
- Gavin Glinton (born 1979), Turks and Caicos Islands footballer
- Gavin L. Graham (1894–1963), South African flying ace
- Gavin Green (born 1993), Malaysian golfer
- Gavin Greenaway (born 1964), English composer
- Gavin Greenlees (1930–1983), Australian poet
- Gavin Greig (1856–1914), Scottish folk song collector, novelist, playwright, and teacher
- Gavin Griffin (born 1981), American poker player
- Gavin Griffin (footballer) (born 1993), Scottish footballer
- Gavin Griffiths (born 1993), English cricketer
- Gavin Gunning (born 1991), Irish footballer
- Gavin Gwynne (born 1990), Welsh boxer
- Gavin Hadley, Hong Kong rugby union player
- Gavin Hanrahan (born 1965), Australian rugby union player
- Gavin Harding (born 1974), English politician and academic
- Gavin Hardkiss (born 1968), South African musician
- Gavin Harper (born 1986), English writer
- Gavin Harrison (born 1963), English musician
- Gavin Hassett (born 1973), Canadian rower
- Gavin Hastings (born 1962), Scottish rugby union player
- Gavin Haynes (born 1969), English cricketer
- Gavin Heeroo (born 1984), English footballer
- Gavin Heffernan (born 1980), Canadian filmmaker
- Gavin Henderson (born 1948), English administrator, conductor, and trumpeter
- Gavin Henderson, 2nd Baron Faringdon (1902–1977), British politician
- Gavin Henson (born 1982), Welsh rugby union player
- Gavin Heslop (born 1997), American football player
- Gavin Hewitt (born 1951), British journalist
- Gavin Hickie (born 1980), Irish rugby union player and coach
- Gavin Higgins (born 1983), English composer
- Gavin Hill (born 1965), New Zealand rugby union player
- Gavin Hipkins (born 1968), New Zealand photographer
- Gavin Hitchings (1937–2018), New Zealand jeweler
- Gavin Hoare (1934–1992), Australian rules footballer
- Gavin Holligan (born 1980), English footballer
- Gavin Hollowell (born 1997), American baseball player
- Gavin Hood (born 1963), South African film director
- Gavin Hoover (born 1997), American cyclist
- Gavin Houston (born 1977), American actor
- Gavin Hoyte (born 1990), English footballer
- Gavin Hume (born 1980), South African rugby union player
- Gavin Hunt (born 1964), South African footballer and manager
- Gavin Hunter (1941–2022), British racehorse trainer
- Gavin Hyman, British theologian
- Gavin Jantjes (born 1948), South African painter, curator, writer, and lecturer
- Gavin Jarvie (1879–?), Scottish footballer
- Gavin Jeanne, Seychellois football manager
- Gavin Jennings (born 1957), Australian politician
- Gavin Wildridge Johnstone (1941–1987), Australian ornithologist
- Gavin Jonas, South African politician
- Gavin Kaysen (born 1979), American chef
- Gavin Keane (born 1966), Australian rules footballer
- Gavin Kelly (born 1968), English footballer
- Gavin Keneally (1933–2020), Australian politician
- Gavin Kerr (born 1977), English rugby union player
- Gavin Kilen (born 2004), American baseball player
- Gavin King (born 1979), Australian journalist
- Gavin Kirk (ice hockey) (born 1951), Canadian ice hockey player
- Gavin Kirk (priest) (born 1961), English Anglican priest
- Gavin Kitching, British academic and writer
- Gavin Kizito (born 2002), Ugandan soccer player
- Gavin Kwan (born 1996), Indonesian footballer
- Gavin I. Langmuir (1924–2005), Canadian historian
- Gavin Lackey (born 1968), Australian modern pentathlete
- Gavin Laird (1933–2017), Scottish trade unionist
- Gavin Lambert (1924–2005), English writer
- Gavin Lane (born 1966), South African footballer
- Gavin Lang (1926–1989), Scottish footballer
- Gavin Larsen (born 1962), New Zealand cricketer
- Gavin Lawless (born 1970), South African rugby union player
- Gavin Lee (born 1971), English actor
- Gavin Lester (born 1977), Australian rugby league player
- Gavin Lewis (born 2003), American actor
- Gavin Liddle (born 1963), English footballer
- Gavin Lightman (1939–2020), English judge
- Gavin Lindsay (born 1929), Canadian ice hockey player
- Gavin Long (1901–1968), Australian journalist and military historian
- Gavin Love (born 1978), English basketball player and coach
- Gavin Lovegrove (born 1967), New Zealand javelin thrower
- Gavin Lowe (born 1995), Scottish rugby union player
- Gavin Lowe (computer scientist), British academic
- Gavin Lurssen, American mastering engineer
- Gavin Lux (born 1997), American baseball player
- Gavin Lyall (1932–2003), English writer
- Gavin Lynch (born 1985), English footballer
- Gavin MacFadyen (1940–2016), American investigative journalist and documentary filmmaker
- Gavin MacIntosh (born 1999), American actor
- Gavin MacKenzie (born 1952), Canadian lawyer
- Gavin MacKenzie (sociologist) (1942–2001), British political scientist and sociologist
- Gavin MacLeod (1931–2021), American actor
- Gavin MacLeod (football) (born 1983), Scottish footballer and manager
- Gavin Maguire (born 1967), English–born Welsh footballer
- Gavin Mahon (born 1977), English footballer
- Gavin Main (born 1995), Scottish cricketer
- Gavin Mannion (born 1991), American cyclist
- Gavin Marguerite (born 1996), French rugby league player
- Gavin Marshall (born 1960), Australian politician
- Gavin Massey (born 1992), English footballer
- Gavin Maxwell (1914–1969), Scottish naturalist and writer
- Gavin Maxwell (canoeist) (born 1970), Canadian sprint canoeist
- Gavin McCallum (born 1987), Canadian soccer player
- Gavin McCann (born 1978), English footballer
- Gavin McClurg (born 1972), American paragliding pilot and sailor
- Gavin McCoy, English radio broadcaster
- Gavin McDonnell (born 1986), English boxer
- Gavin McGowan (born 1976), English footballer
- Gavin McInnes (born 1970), Canadian writer, actor, comedian and founder of the Proud Boys
- Gavin McLean (born 1965), New Zealand fencer
- Gavin McMahon (born 1975), Australian rules footballer
- Gavin Meadows (born 1977), English swimmer
- Gavin Menzies (1937–2020), English pseudohistorian
- Gavin Mikhail (born 1975), American composer, pianist, singer, and songwriter
- Gavin Millar (1938–2022), Scottish film director, critic, and television presenter
- Gavin Miller (born 1960), Australian rugby league player
- Gavin Milroy (1805–1886), Scottish physician and medical writer
- Gavin Mogopa (born 1996), Botswana judoka
- Gavin Morgan (born 1976), Canadian ice hockey player
- Gavin Morgan (footballer) (1911–1991), Australian rules footballer
- Gavin Morris (born 1998), South African cricketer
- Gavin Morrison (born 1990), Scottish footballer
- Gavin Mortimer, British writer and historian
- Gavin Moynihan (born 1994), Irish golfer
- Gavin Mudd, Australian academic
- Gavin Murgatroyd (born 1969), Namibian cricketer
- Gavin Murray (born 1957), Scottish footballer and manager
- Gavin Nebbeling (born 1963), South African footballer
- Gavin Newlands (born 1980), Scottish politician
- Gavin Newsom (born 1967), American politician
- Gavin Nisbet, Scottish footballer
- Gavin Noble (born 1981), Irish triathlete
- Gavin O'Brien (born 1993), Irish hurler
- Gavin Ó Fearraigh (born 1980), Irish actor, dancer, and model
- Gavin O'Keefe, Australian illustrator
- Gavin O'Mahony (born 1987), Irish hurler
- Gavin O'Reilly (born 1966), Irish businessman
- Gavin Ortlund (born 1983), an American Christian apologist and theologian
- Gavin O'Toole (born 1975), Irish footballer
- Gavin Oliver (born 1962), English footballer
- Gavin Ortega (born 2004), American football player
- Gavin Y. Oudit, Canadian cardiologist and clinician-scientist
- Gavin Packard (1964–2012), Indian actor
- Gavin Parker (born 1969), British air marshal
- Gavin Parsonage (born 1968), Australian cyclist
- Gavin Patterson (born 1967), British chief executive
- Gavin Peacock (born 1967), English footballer
- Gavin Peers (born 1985), Irish footballer
- Gavin Petrie, British writer and producer
- Gavin Pfitzner (born 1966), Australian tennis player
- Gavin Pfuhl (1947–2002), South African cricketer
- Gavin Plumley (born 1981), British writer and broadcaster
- Gavin Polone, American film and television producer
- Gavin Pretor-Pinney, British author
- Gavin Price (born 1974), Scottish footballer and manager
- Gavin Price-Jones (born 1970), English rugby league player
- Gavin Prout (born 1978), Canadian lacrosse player
- Gavin Pyper (born 1979), Scottish racing driver
- Gavin Quinn (born 1981), Australian rugby league player
- Gavin Quinnell (born 1983), Welsh rugby union player
- Gavin Rae (born 1977), Scottish footballer and manager
- Gavin Rain (born 1971), South African artist
- Gavin Rajah (born 1970), South African fashion designer
- Gavin Ramjaun (born 1983), English journalist
- Gavin Reddy (born 1996), South African cricketer
- Gavin Rees (born 1980), Welsh footballer
- Gavin Reid (born 1934), English Anglican bishop
- Gavin Clydesdale Reid (born 1946), Scottish economist
- Gavin Reilly (born 1993), Scottish footballer
- Gavin Relly (1926–1999), South African businessman
- Gavin Rennie (born 1976), Zimbabwean cricketer
- Gavin Reynolds (born 1979), English cricketer
- Gavin Richards (born 1946), English actor, writer, and theatre director
- Gavin Roberts (born 1984), Welsh rugby union player
- Gavin Robertson (born 1966), Australian cricketer
- Gavin Robinson (born 1984), Northern Ireland politician
- Gavin Robinson (model agent) (1935–2002), South African model agent
- Gavin Rose (born 1969), Australian rules footballer
- Gavin Rossdale (born 1965), English musician, singer, and songwriter
- Gavin Rothery (born 1987), English footballer
- Gavin Rothery, British filmmaker and graphic designer
- Gavin Rayna Russom (born 1974), American musician
- Gavin Salam, theoretical particle physicist
- Gavin Sawchuk (born 2003), American football player
- Gavin Schilling (born 1995), German basketball player
- Gavin Schmidt, British climatologist
- Gavin Schmitt (born 1986), Canadian volleyball player
- Gavin Scott (born 1950), English screenwriter
- Gavin Scott (rugby union) (born 1974), Scottish rugby union player
- Gavin Seager (born 1978), English racing driver
- Gavin Seim (born 1985), American activist
- Gavin Sheets (born 1996), American baseball player
- Gavin Shephard (born 1971), English cricketer
- Gavin Shoesmith, Australian musician, singer, and songwriter
- Gavin Short (born 1962), Falkland Islands politician
- Gavin Shuker (born 1981), English politician
- Gavin Sibayan (born 1981), American Paralympic soccer player
- Gavin Simonds, 1st Viscount Simonds (1881–1971), British judge and politician
- Gavin Singh (born 1987), Surinamese cricketer
- Gavin Skelton (born 1981), English footballer, coach, and manager
- Gavin Smellie (born 1986), Jamaican–born Canadian sprinter
- Gavin Sontag (born 1977), American tennis player
- Gavin Souter (born 1929), Australian journalist and historian
- Gavin Spielman (born 1972), American painter and musician
- Gavin St Pier (born 1967), Guernsey politician
- Gavin Stamp (1948–2017), British writer and architectural historian
- Gavin Stenhouse (born 1986), English actor
- Gavin Stevens (born 1932), Australian cricketer
- Gavin Stevens (cyclist) (born 1960), New Zealand cyclist
- Gavin Stewart (born 1957), Northern Irish rower
- Gavin Stone (born 1998), American baseball player
- Gavin Stone (born 1997), Canadian rower
- Gavin Strachan (born 1978), Scottish footballer
- Gavin Strang (born 1943), Scottish politician
- Gavin Sutherland (disambiguation), multiple people
- Gavin Swan (born 1970), Australian cricketer
- Gavin Swankie (born 1983), Scottish footballer
- Gavin Taylor (c. 1942–2013), British film and television director
- Gavin Templeton (born 1978), American musician
- Gavin Thomas (born 1977), Welsh rugby union player
- Gavin Thompson, Australian rugby league player
- Gavin Thorley (1947–2022), New Zealand long-distance runner
- Gavin Thornbury (born 1993), Irish rugby union player
- Gavin Thorpe, British board game designer and author
- Gavin Thredgold (born 1961), Australian rowing coxswain and coach
- Gavin Tomlin (born 1983), English footballer
- Gavin Tonge (born 1983), Antigua and Barbuda cricketer
- Gavin Trippe (1940–2018), English motorcycle racing promoter, journalist, and publisher
- Gavin Tucker (born 1986), Canadian mixed martial artist
- Gavin Turek, American singer, songwriter, dancer, and actress
- Gavin Turk (born 1967), English artist
- Gavin Urquhart (born 1988), Australian rules footballer
- Gavin Verhey (born 1990), American game designer
- Gavin Vernon (1926–2004), Scottish engineer
- Gavin Vlijter (born 1997), Surinamese footballer
- Gavin Wallace (born 1984), Jamaican cricketer
- Gavin Walls (born 1980), American football player
- Gavin Walsh (born 1965), Irish computer programmer and writer
- Gavin Wanganeen (born 1973), Australian rules footballer
- Gavin Ware (born 1993), American basketball player
- Gavin Webster (born 1969), English comedian
- Gavin Weightman (1945–2022), English journalist
- Gavin Wheeldon (born 1976), English businessman and entrepreneur
- Gavin White, Irish Gaelic footballer
- Gavin Whittaker (1970–2017), Australian rugby league player
- Gavin Whyte (born 1996), Northern Irish footballer
- Gavin Wilkinson (born 1973), New Zealand footballer
- Gavin Williamson (born 1976), British politician
- Gavin Wolpert (born 1984), Canadian–American bridge player
- Gavin Wood, English computer scientist
- Gavin Worboys (born 1974), English footballer
- Gavin Wright (born 1943), American historian
- Gavin Yamey, British–American physician and global health researcher
- Gavin Yates, New Zealand Anglican clergyman
- Gavin Young (1928–2001), English journalist and writer

== People with the surname ==
- Agnes Gavin (1872–1947), Australian actor and screenwriter
- Aisling Jarrett-Gavin (born 1989/1990), English actress
- Andy Gavin (born 1970), American programmer
- Barrie Gavin (born 1935), British film director
- Barry Gavin (1944–2017), Australian rules footballer
- Bill Gavin (1907–1985), American radio personality and publisher
- Blair Gavin (born 1989), American soccer player
- Brian Gavin (referee) (born 1977), Irish hurling referee
- Buck Gavin (1895–1981), American football player
- Catherine Gavin (1907–2000), Scottish academic historian, war correspondent and historical novelist
- Charles Gavin (born 1960), Brazilian drummer and music producer
- Cy Gavin (born 1985), American artist
- Diarmuid Gavin (born 1964), Irish garden designer and television personality
- Don Gavin, American stand-up comedian and actor
- Enon Gavin (born 1971), Irish Gaelic footballer
- Erica Gavin (born 1947), American actress
- Francis Gavin (born 1962), American political scientist
- Frank Gavin (disambiguation), multiple people
- Frankie Gavin (disambiguation), multiple people
- George Gavin (1810–1880), Irish politician
- James M. Gavin (1907–1991), American general
- Hector Gavin (1815–1855), Scottish physician and sanitarian
- Herb Gavin (1921–2009), United States Army Air Forces test pilot
- Hugh Gavin (1878–1940), Australian rules footballer
- James Gavin (disambiguation), multiple people
- Jamila Gavin British Indian born author of The Surya Trilogy
- Jason Gavin (disambiguation), multiple people
- Jim Gavin (footballer) (born 1971), Irish Gaelic footballer and manager
- John Gavin (1931–2018), American actor, diplomat, and politician
- John Gavin (disambiguation) or Johnny Gavin, multiple people
- Joseph G. Gavin Jr (1920–2010), American engineer
- Julian Gavin (born 1965), Australian-born British opera singer
- Katie Gavin (born 1992), American singer-songwriter
- Keith Edmund Gavin (1960 – 2024), American convicted murderer
- Kelontae Gavin (born 1999), American gospel singer and preacher
- Ken Gavin (1883 – c. 1956), Australian rugby union player
- Kim Gavin, British choreographer
- Leon H. Gavin (1893–1963), American politician
- Mark Gavin (born 1963), Scottish footballer
- Michael Gavin (born 1986), American soccer player
- Natalie Gavin, English actress
- Nigel Gavin, New Zealand musician and composer
- Norman Gavin (1922–2013), English cricketer
- Oliver Gavin (born 1972), British racing driver
- Paddy Gavin (1929–2006), Irish footballer
- Pat Gavin (born 1967), English footballer
- Patrick Gavin, Northern Irish footballer
- Peter Gavin (Canadian politician) (1847–1931), Canadian merchant and politician
- Peter Gavin (Australian politician) (born 1949), Australian politician
- Robert Gavin (1827–1883), British painter
- Rod Gavin (born 1949), New Zealand canoeist
- Rupert Gavin (born 1953), English businessman
- Stewart Gavin (born 1960), Canadian ice hockey player
- Tim Gavin (born 1963), Australian rugby union player

== Fictional characters with the given name ==
- Gavin Stevens (Faulkner character), a character in several novels by William Faulkner
- Gavin Sullivan, a character in the BBC soap opera EastEnders
- Gavin Volure, a character in the television series 30 Rock

== Fictional characters with the surname ==
- Teddy Gavin, a character in the television series Rescue Me
- Tommy Gavin, protagonist of the television series Rescue Me
- Kristoph Gavin, a character in the video game Apollo Justice: Ace Attorney
- Klavier Gavin, a prosecutor in the video game Apollo Justice: Ace Attorney

== See also ==
- Cyclone Gavin, a tropical cyclone of the 1982–83 South Pacific cyclone season
- Gabinus, the name of two early Christian martyrs (sometimes known in English as Saint Gavin)
- Gavin Power Plant, a coal-fired power station in Cheshire, Ohio, United States
- Gavan (disambiguation)
- Gavino, unrelated Italian name
- Gavín, Spain
