= Gavino =

- Pronunciation: Italian: [ɡaˈviːno]
- Gender: Male
- Language: Italian

Origin
- Origin: Latin
- Meaning: 'from Gabii'

Other names
- Variant forms: Gabino, Baingio

Gavino is both a surname and a male given name. It is common in Sardinia, Italy, due to being the Italianised form of the Sardinian language personal name Gavinu or Baingiu. Saint Gavinus (San Gavino, Porto Torres, Sardinia) was an early Christian martyr, a former Roman centurion beheaded in 300 AD, whose head was thrown in the Mediterranean Sea before being reunited with his body.

Despite its form and similarity in spelling, it is unrelated to Gavin, dating back to ancient Latin (meaning 'from Gabii'). However, sometimes Gavin is used to translate the Latin name Gavinus.

Notable people with the name include:

== Given name ==
- Gavino Angius (born 1946), Italian politician
- Ignazio Gavino Bonavito (1792–1865), Maltese judge and chief justice of Malta (1839–1853)
- Gavino Contini (1855–1915), Sardinian-Italian poet
- Gavino Gabriel (1881–1980), Italian composer and musicologist
- Gavino Gulia (1835–1889), Maltese botanist and author
- Gavino Gutierrez (1849–1919), American businessman and civil engineer
- Gavino Ledda (born 1938), Italian writer and scholar
- Gavino Matta (1910–1954), Italian boxer
- Gavino Pizzolato (1884–1943), Italian general
- Gavino Maximo Teodosio (1929–1997), Filipino actor
- Gavino Trono (born 1931), Filipino marine biologist
- Gavino Sumadsad (born 1978), Filipino Techonologist,

== Surname ==
- Damiano Gavino (born 2001), Italian actor
- Lea Gavino (born 1999), Italian actress and singer-songwriter

=== Gaviño ===
- Elías Lafertte Gaviño (1886–1961), Chilean politician
- Francisco Gaviño (born 1997), Spanish equestrian
- Juan Emilio Bosch y Gaviño (1909–2001), Dominican politician and writer

== See also ==
- Gabino, another given name
- Gavinus
- San Gavino (disambiguation)
