= Gabino =

Gabino is a masculine surname which may refer to:

- Gabino Amparán (born 1968), Mexican football manager
- Gabino Apolonio (born 1971), Mexican former long-distance runner
- Gabino Arregui (1914–1991), Argentine footballer
- Gabino Barreda (1818–1881), Mexican physician, philosopher and politician
- Gabino Bugallal Araújo (1861–1932), Spanish politician
- Gabino Coria Peñaloza (1881–1975), Argentine poet and lyricist
- Gabino Cué Monteagudo (born 1966), Mexican politician
- Gabino Díaz Merchán (1926–2022), Spanish Roman Catholic prelate, theologian, philosopher and Archbishop of Oviedo
- Gabino Diego (born 1966), Spanish actor
- Gabino Espinoza (born 1991), Mexican footballer
- Gabino Ezeiza (1858–1916), Argentine musician
- Gabino Gaínza (1753–1829), Spanish military officer and politician, first ruler of an independent Central America, Captain General of Chile, of Guatemala and of Central America
- Gabino Palomares (born 1950), Mexican singer-songwriter and social and political activist
- Gabino Puello (1816–1847), Dominican soldier and a leader in the Dominican War of Independence
- Gabino Rey (1928–2006), Spanish painter known artistically as Gabino
- Gabino Rodríguez (footballer) (born 1964), Spanish former footballer known simply as Gabino
- Gabino Rodríguez (cyclist) (1927–1998), Mexican cyclist who competed in the 1948 Olympics
- Gabino Rodríguez, actor nominated for the Ariel Award for Best Supporting Actor in 2007
- Gabino Sosa (comedian) (1938–2003), Uruguayan comedian and musician
- Gabino Sosa (footballer) (1899–1971), Argentine footballer
- Gabino Velasco (born 1984), Mexican former footballer
- Gabino Zavala (born 1951), Mexican-American Catholic former prelate who resigned after admitting he was the father of two children
- Gabino, alias of Nicolás Rodríguez Bautista, one of the leaders of the National Liberation Army (Colombia) far-left insurgency group

== See also ==
- Gavino, another given name
