= Nikki Ross =

Nikki Ross may refer to:

- Nikki Sievwright (1943–2018), née Ross, English fashion model
- Nikki Ross (singer) (1972–2026), American gospel singer
