= Yuri Zhukov =

Yuri Zhukov may refer to:

- Yuri Zhukov (politician) (1908–1991), journalist and political figure in the Soviet Union
- Yuri Zhukov (historian) (born 1938), Russian historian
- Yuri Zhukov (dancer) (born 1964), Russian ballet dancer
