= Serrablo churches =

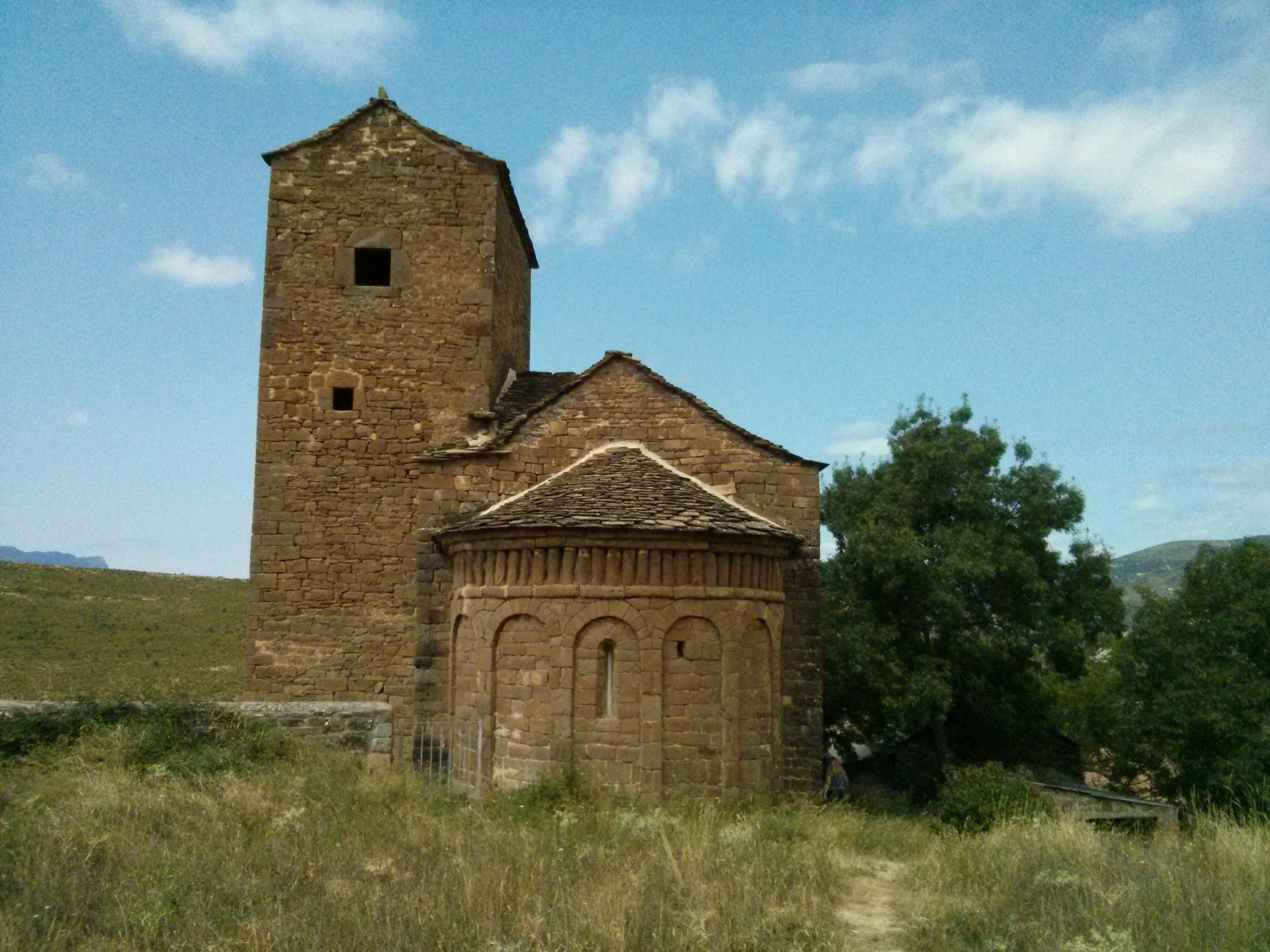
The church of San Andrés de Satué

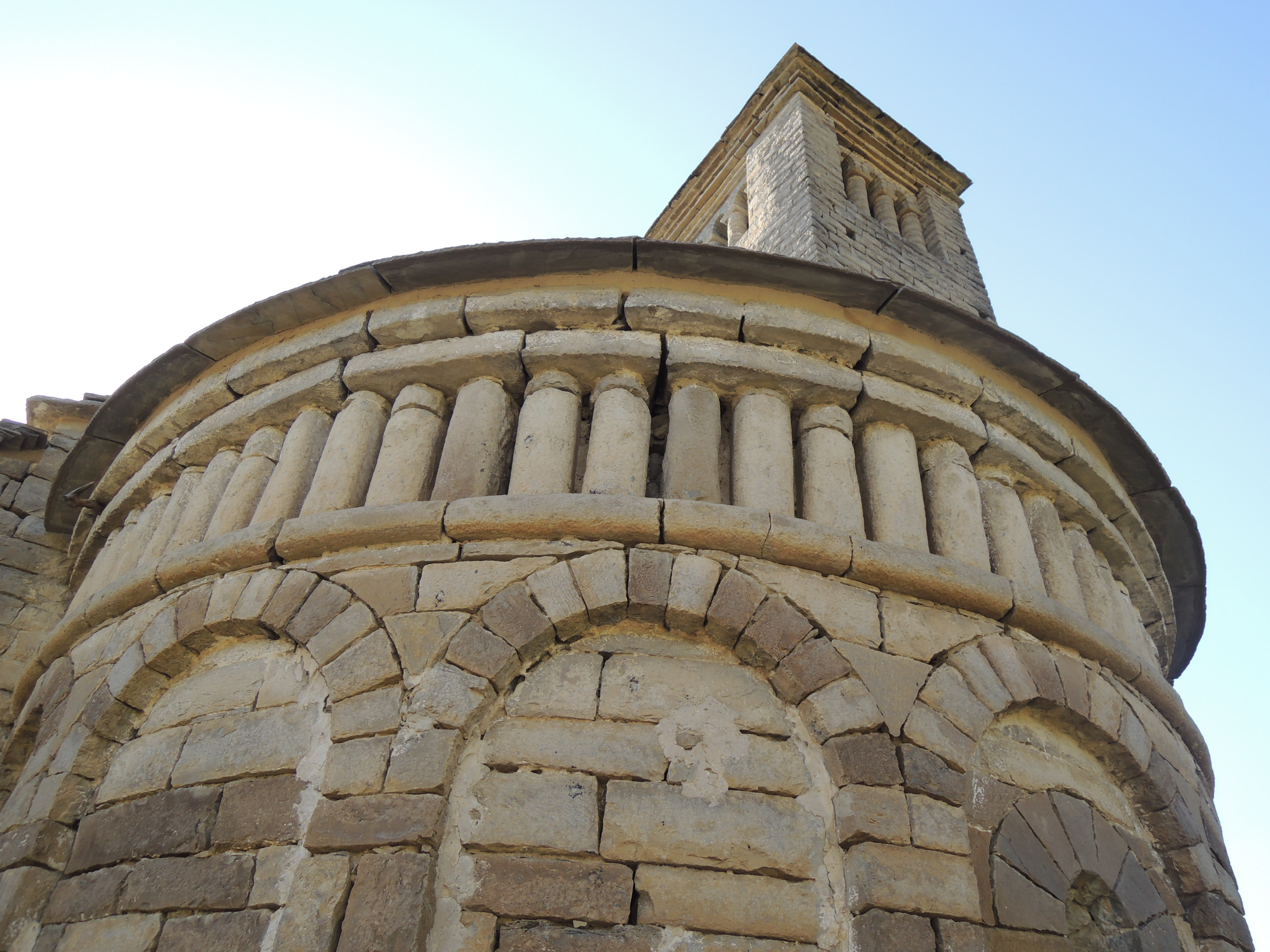
Baquetones on the apse of the church of San Pedro de Lárrede

The Serrablo Churches (Spanish: Iglesias del Serrablo) (Aragonese: Ilesias de Sarrablo) are a group of early-romanesque and mozarabic churches located in small villages of Alto Gállego (Huesca, Aragon, Spain). The churches are thought to have been built by the mozarabic presence in the area between the 10th and 11th century, a time in which Serrablo was bordered by the moorish state of Al-Andalus.

These churches (as identified by the regional comarca) are: San Bartolomé de Gavín, Santa Eulalia de Susín, San Pedro de Larrade, San Andrés de Satue, San Juan de Orús, San Pedro de Lasieso, San Juan de Busa, Santa Eulalia de Orós Bajo, San Martín de Olivan, Santa María de Isún de Basa, San Juan y Santa María Espierre, San Martín de Ordovés, San Miguel de Orna, Monasterio de San Pelay, Iglesia de los Santos Reyes de Javierrelatre y San Miguel de Latre, San Salvador de Basarán.

== Architectural Features ==
The churches share many notable features, most of them (with a notable exception of San Juan de Busa) have a small rectangular nave, an apse, and a slim bell tower. Their windows consist of 1-3 horseshoe arches framed with a rectangular alfiz, features that are commonly found in religious Islamic buildings such as the Great Mosque of Kairouan. Akin to their windows, the typical door consists of a light horseshoe arch and a rectangular alfiz. Their apses (and occasionally their towers) contain vertically set cylindrical stones, or baquetones, which are unique to the region. Apses always contain an odd number of arches because this means one arch is in the middle.

== Friends of Serrablo ==
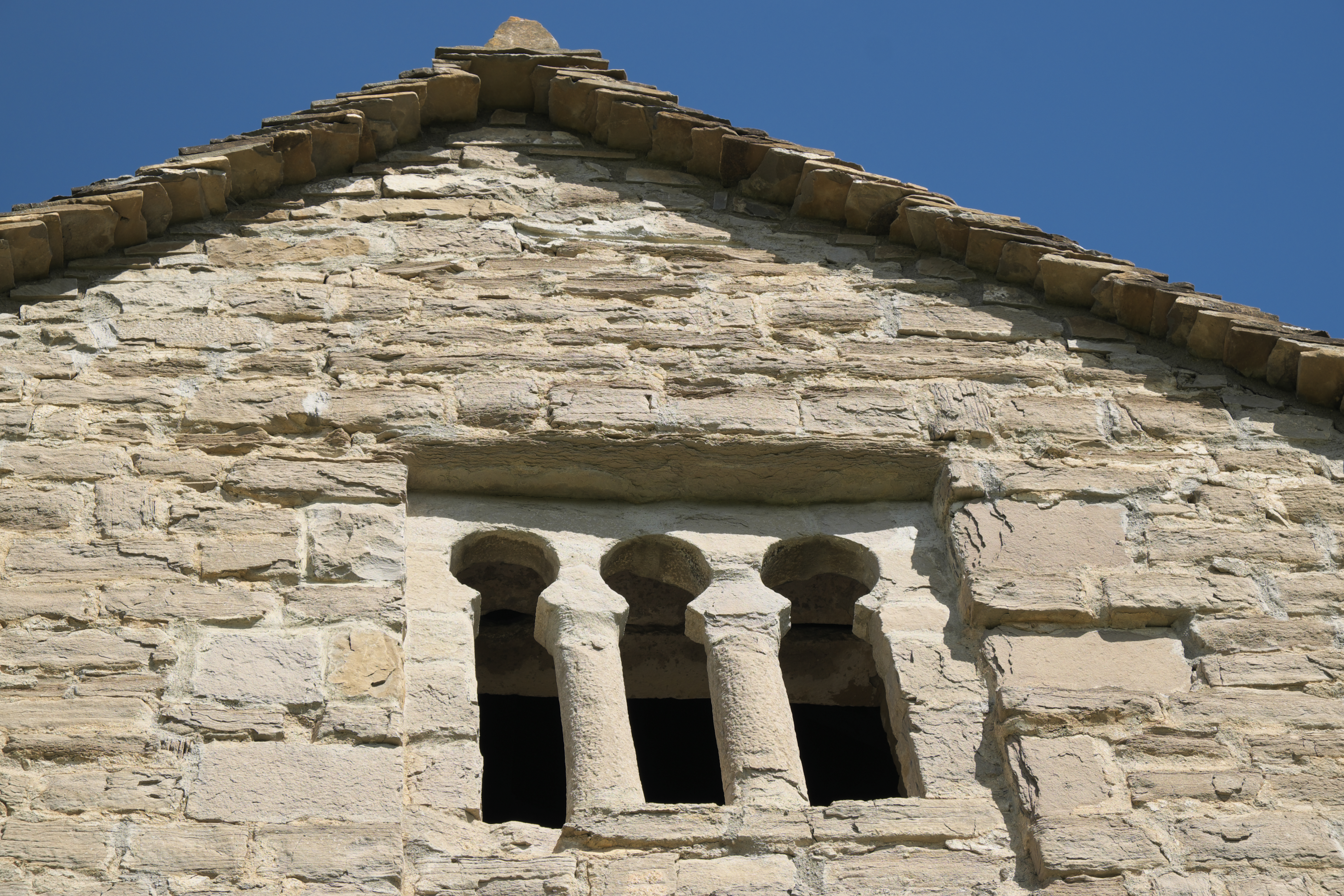
Light horseshoe arches in the church of San Juan de Busa

In 1971, the association of Friends of Serrablo was created by local historians with the goal of restoring churches in the face of ruin and preserving local culture. The Serrablo churches (with the exception of San Pedro de Lárrede in 1931) were declared Spanish properties of cultural interest with help from Friends of Serrablo in 1982. Their work merited them a Gold Medal for Fine Arts in 1985, and a Europa Nostra award in 2002 among others.

== See also ==
Friends of Serrablo
