= Gabino Sosa =

Gabino Sosa may refer to:

- Gabino Sosa (footballer) (1899–1971), Argentine footballer
- Gabino Sosa (comedian) (1938–2003), Uruguayan comedian and musician
- Estadio Gabino Sosa, football stadium in Santa Fe, Argentina, named after the footballer
