= James Galvin =

James Galvin may refer to:

- Jim Galvin (baseball) (1907–1969), Major League Baseball player
- Pud Galvin (1856–1902), Major League baseball player
- James Galvin (poet) (born 1951), American poet

== See also ==
- James Gavin (disambiguation)
