= Gavin Harding =

British politician (born 1974)

Cllr Gavin Harding MBE

Mayor of Selby
- In office 2015–2016
- Preceded by: Rosie Corrigan
- Succeeded by: Steve Shaw-Wright

Selby Town Councillor for North Ward
- Incumbent
- Assumed office 2011

Personal details
- Born: Gavin Nigel Xavier Harding; 18 March 1974 (age 52) Selby, West Riding of Yorkshire
- Party: Labour
- Education: Brayton High School
- Alma mater: Selby College

Gavin Nigel Xavier Harding MBE (born 18 March 1974) is a British politician and academic who was mayor of Selby, North Yorkshire, England. He was the first person in the United Kingdom to become mayor while being formally diagnosed as having a learning disability.

Harding grew up in Selby, and studied at Brayton High School and Selby College. He is a Labour councillor on Selby Town Council having lived in Selby most of his life representing Selby North ward. Harding has now been elected for his 3rd term as a councillor. He founded a self-advocacy group Voices for People and works for NHS England as a senior learning disability advisor.

Harding served as deputy mayor of Selby in 2014 before being appointed mayor the following year. In 2014, he was awarded an MBE. He has been part of a committee looking into the progress of Winterbourne View, a private hospital condemned for its abuse of people with learning difficulties.

In 2019 Harding was included in the Shaw Trust "Power 100" list of the most influential disabled people for that year.
