= Gavin James =

Gavin James may refer to:

- Sir Gavin Fullarton James, 4th Baronet (1859–1937), of the James baronets of Dublin
- Gavin James (footballer) (born 1989), English-born Vincentian striker for Flackwell Heath
- Gavin James (singer), Irish singer-songwriter
- Gavin James, CEO and CFO of Vertex (company)

== See also ==
- James Gavin (disambiguation)
