= San Gavino =

San Gavino or San-Gavino may refer to:

- San Gavino Monreale, a comune in the Province of South Sardinia in the Italian region Sardini
- San Gavino, a Christian saint who is greatly celebrated in Sardinia, Italy, as one of the Martyrs of Torres
- Basilica of San Gavino, a proto-Romanesque church in Porto Torres, Sardinia, Italy

== San-Gavino ==
- San-Gavino-d'Ampugnani, commune in the Haute-Corse department of France on the island of Corsica
- San-Gavino-di-Fiumorbo, commune in the Haute-Corse department of France on the island of Corsica
- San-Gavino-di-Carbini, commune in the Corse-du-Sud department of France on the island of Corsica
- San-Gavino-di-Tenda, commune in the Haute-Corse department of France on the island of Corsica
