= Lárrede =

Lárrede Larrede
- Locale
- Location within Spain
- Coordinates: 42.5533°N 0.3169°W
- Country: Spain
- Autonomous community: Aragon
- Comarca: Alto Gállego
- Province: Huesca
- Elevation: 822 m (2,697 ft)

Population (2016)
  - Total: 21

Lárrede (Aragonese: Larrede) is a locale in Spain, today a part of the municipality of Sabiñánigo in the province of Huesca, comarca of Alto Gállego, in the autonomous community of Aragón. It is 822 meters above sea level and had fifteen inhabitants as of 1999.

The church of Lárrede ^{es}, dedicated to Saint Peter (San Pedro), was built in the 1050s in the First Romanesque style. It is the representative church of the infamous Serrablo churches, sometimes said to be constructed in the estilo larredense. It has a cruciform plan, unique to the Serrablo churches, and five south-facing windows, while almost all other churches in the Serrablo have three. It was designated a national monument in 1931.

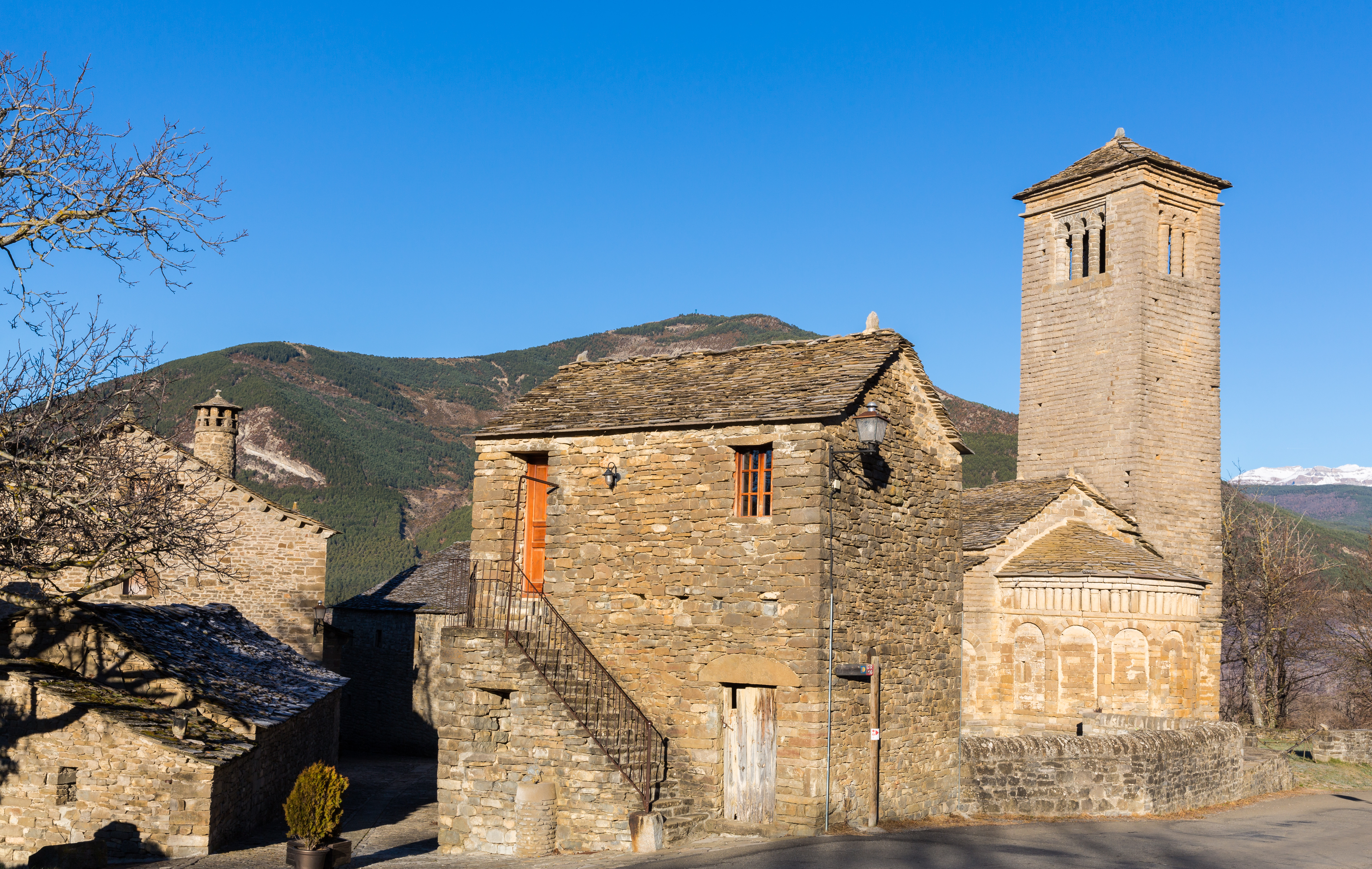
Church of San Pedro in Lárrede ^{es}
