= Gavin Hardkiss =

Electronic musician (born 1968)

Gavin Hardkiss (born Gavin Bieber on November 29, 1968) is an electronic musician, DJ, label owner, producer, remixer, author and artist who has performed under the name "Gavin Hardkiss" and "Hawke". He was born in Johannesburg, South Africa and immigrated to the United States to attend the University of Pennsylvania, where he got a Bachelor of Arts degree in 1991. In the early 1990s, along with faux brothers Robbie and Scott, Gavin Hardkiss helped pioneer the American electronic music scene with the record label Hardkiss Music. Hardkiss rapidly accrued international attention, and his double album Delusions of Grandeur reached number one on the Rolling Stone alternative charts. Under the name Hawke, Hardkiss has produced experimental albums remixing artists such as Youssou N'Dour, Mazzy Star, Elton John and Michael Franti, and has performed alongside Afrika Bambaataa, Derrick May, Snoop Dogg and Buena Vista Social Club. In 2010, the song "Mundo Via Afrika" was featured on the official Sony World Cup album "Hello Africa", alongside the best of contemporary African musicians. In 2013, Hardkiss self-published a novel titled Cubic Lust.

== Recordings ==
Gavin Bieber has recorded five albums and multiple singles under the moniker Hawke. The albums can be loosely described as a series of sound clashes, collaborations and musical experiments that veer off the path of conventional dance music. The first Hawke album, Namaquadisco, was released in 1998 on Sunburn Recordings in the US and Distance in France. The album was recorded in Hyde Street Studios in San Francisco's Tenderloin district. Heatstroke, recorded in the Hardkiss Studio based at Frisco Studios in the Lower Haight in San Francisco, was released by Six Degrees Records in 2000. The single "Party People" was a breakout into Billboard Magazine's Dance Charts. Love Won Another was recorded in a farm house in Calistoga, California, and released on Eighth Dimension Records in 2004. The album spawned two remix albums and several music videos. In 2009, an album titled +++, recorded in San Diego and San Rafael, California, was released on Eighth Dimension Records. It was inaugurated with a series of art gallery shows in San Francisco, CA, Los Angeles and Orlando featuring multi-media works inspired by songs from the album.

In 1998, Gavin Hardkiss created a three-part musical landscape titled Museo Hypnotica for the Jean Giraud–designed Airtight Garage environment at the Sony Metreon in San Francisco. In 2008, Hardkiss worked with the Zukov Ballet Theater on original music production and DJ performance at the Yerba Buena Center for the Arts in San Francisco. Between 2011 and 2013, Gavin Hardkiss had a weekly radio show on pirate Radio Valencia called In My Boom, which highlighted local San Francisco dance music. In 2017, the Hawke album Love In Stars was released through a crowdfunding campaign, which included a treasure hunt for gold USBs containing Hawke music which were hidden in the hills around the Bay Area. Insomniac Magazine called it a "Willy Wonka-style ... experiment in giving both artistic and economic value to a digital music project." In 2020, the album Dark Art of Light Work was released together with a book of the same name. Dark Art of Light Work explores how the imagination creates reality.

Hardkiss has also recorded music under aliases including The Lower Haight High Hitters, Curious Yellow, and Sunburn Kidz.
