= Gavin Hadley =

Hong Kong rugby union player

Gavin Hadley is a current Hong Kong Rugby Union player. He plays for the Hong Kong Football Club and the Hong Kong National Team. Hadley has also played for the Hong Kong A team. He was named in the Hong Kong squad to the 2015 Asian Rugby Championship.

Hadley was part of the historic Hong Kong squad that toured Europe in 2009. They played against Germany, the Czech Republic and Holland.
