= Gavin McMahon =

Australian rules footballer

Personal information
- Full name: Gavin McMahon
- Born: 22 January 1975 (age 51)
- Original team: East Wagga-Kooringal
- Height: 187 cm (6 ft 2 in)
- Weight: 89 kg (196 lb)

Playing career^{1}
Years	Club	Games (Goals)
1993–1994	Sydney Swans	5 (0)
- ^{1} Playing statistics correct to the end of 1994.

Gavin McMahon (born 22 January 1975) is a former Australian rules footballer who played with the Sydney Swans in the Australian Football League (AFL).

McMahon was recruited from East Wagga-Kooringal. A half back, he made two appearances in the 1993 AFL season and played three games in 1994.
