= Latre =

- Locality
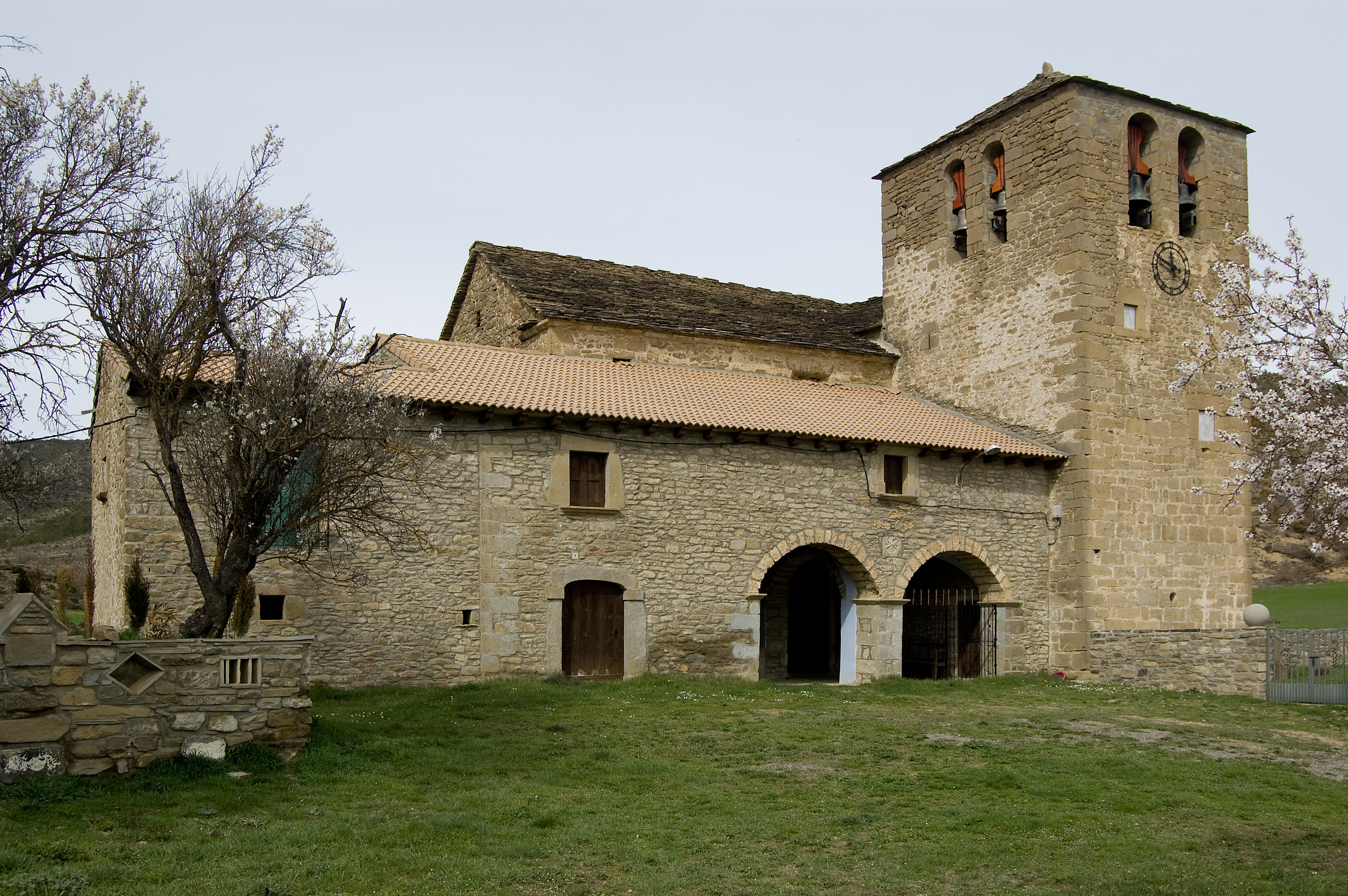
- Church of San Miguel
- Interactive map of Latre
- Coordinates: 42°24′49.9″N 0°29′8.8″W
- Elevation: 698 m (2,290 ft)

Population (2019 (INE))
  - Total: 20

Latre (Spanish pronunciation: [latɾe]) is a locality situated in the municipality of Caldearenas (Alto Gállego, Huesca, Aragon, Spain). In 2019, it had a population of 20 inhabitants.
