= Gavin Walsh =

Irish computer programmer (born 1965)

- Occupation: Programmer
- Known for: Music memorabilia collection
- Website: http://www.whaah.com/

Gavin Walsh (born 1965) is an Irish computer programmer, non-fiction writer, and collector of rare music memorabilia.

Walsh began collecting music memorabilia at the age of 14, traveling from his home town of Sligo to Dublin to purchase rare records and working in hotels to fund his hobby. He is "one of the largest record owners" in the world and, as of 2006, had amassed a collection of approximately 25,000 memorabilia items – up from roughly 20,000 in 2002-2003. The collection includes memorabilia related to The Beatles, Dervish, Madonna, and U2, among others, and contains around 1,100 posters, which Walsh has estimated to be worth as much as €1,000 each. In 2002, he ordered construction of a concrete bunker in his back-garden to hold his collection; the bunker is bomb and earthquake-proof.

Walsh owns the world's largest collection of records and memorabilia linked to the 1970s punk rock group Sex Pistols. In 2002, it included roughly 11,000 items. He has also written two books about the Sex Pistols. In 2003, he published God Save the Sex Pistols as a "definitive guide" to "Sex Pistols memorabilia"; two years later, in 2005, he published The Greatest Sex Pistols Collection. Walsh has published one other book, titled Punk on 45: Revolutions on Vinyl 1976-79, which explores album art on punk rock records in the late 1970s.

In 1999, the Royal Festival Hall took Walsh's collection on an international tour. In 2004, a portion of his collection relating to pop band Westlife were placed on display in Church Street Gallery in Sligo. The exhibit included items from 60 countries and rare items that even the band's members did not possess.

In addition to his collecting, Walsh operates an Internet firm.

== Selected publications ==
- (2003). God Save the Sex Pistols: A Collector's Guide to the Priests of Punk. London: Plexus Publishing. ISBN 978-0-85965-316-9.
- (2006). Punk on 45: Revolutions on Vinyl 1976-79. London: Plexus Publishing. ISBN 978-0-85965-370-1.
