= Nikki Sievwright =

English fashion model

Nicola Sievwright
- Nikki Ross's model card, Peter Lumley, 1969
- Born: Nicola Macwilliam Ross; 28 January 1943; Uckfield, Sussex, England
- Died: 12 March 2018 (aged 75); Swindon, Wiltshire, England
- Occupations: Model; soldier
- Spouses: John Venning (m. 1968; div. 1974); David Sievwright (m. 1974)
- Children: 2
- Military career
- Allegiance: United Kingdom
- Branch: British Army
- Unit: Ulster Defence Regiment
- Conflicts: The Troubles

Nicola Macwilliam Sievwright (née Ross; 28 January 1943 – 12 March 2018) was an English fashion model who worked for Chloé and Peter Lumley. After marrying a cavalry officer in the British Army and moving to Northern Ireland, she joined the Ulster Defence Regiment as a greenfinch.

== Early life and family ==
Nicola Ross was born on 28 January 1943 to Charles Ross, an officer in the Colonial Service in Sierra Leone, and his wife Nina. Her mother was sent to England for Nikki's birth and she did not see her father until 1947. Her mother died four years later and her father remarried. The family moved to Jersey where Nicola attended the Victoria College and became a strong horse rider.

Ross married the property developer John Venning in 1968 and, after they were divorced in 1974, David Sievwright, an officer in the 13th/18th Royal Hussars. They had one son and one daughter.

== Modelling ==
After school, Ross moved to Paris where she was signed as a model for the French fashion house Chloé at the age of 18. Two years later she moved to London. In November 1965 she took part in a fashion show aboard the RMS Queen Elizabeth in New York designed to capitalise on the Swinging London phenomenon with the aim of taking £1m of fashion orders in one week. She worked with Gavin Robinson of Old Bond Street in 1966 and 1967 and was signed by Peter Lumley. She was tipped to replace Jean Shrimpton and became a regular in the gossip columns but disappointed the newspapers with her clean lifestyle.

== Ulster Defence Regiment ==
After her husband and his regiment were posted to Northern Ireland during The Troubles in the 1970s, Nikki Sievwright joined the Ulster Defence Regiment as a greenfinch, an act unprecedented for a cavalry officer's wife. She continued to work as a model. Women were first admitted to the regiment in 1973 due to a shortage of women from other services who could perform tasks only suitable for a woman to carry out, such as searching other women for explosives. In 1978, while operating a checkpoint in the "bandit country" of County Tyrone, near the border with the Irish Republic, Sievwright captured a wanted man after she found his passport hidden in the knickers of a woman he was with.

== Later life ==
Sievwright later travelled around the world with her husband as he held various posts in military intelligence and rose to the rank of lieutenant colonel. She retired to Wiltshire where she rode horses and played tennis. She died of sepsis at the Great Western Hospital, Swindon, on 12 March 2018.
