= Herb Gavin =

United States Air Force general

Herbert "Herb" James Gavin (15 November 1921 in Winterset, Iowa – 27 June 2009 in California) was an American Chief Test Pilot in the United States Army Air Forces during World War II. He retired on 1 June 1978 as Major General. He is buried in Arlington National Cemetery.

== Awards ==
- Command Pilot Badge
- Air Force Distinguished Service Medal with bronze oak leaf cluster
- Silver Star Medal
- Legion of Merit
- Distinguished Flying Cross
- Bronze Star Medal
- Meritorious Service Medal
- Air Medal with 7 oak leaf clusters
- Air Force Commendation Medal with oak leaf cluster
- Presidential Unit Citation
- Air Force Outstanding Unit Award with oak leaf cluster
- Combat Readiness Medal

== Sources ==
- Military Times/Hall of Valor
- US Air Force Website
