= Gavin Mortimer =

British writer

- Occupation: Non-fiction writer
- Period: 2001-present
- Subject: Military; World War 2

Website
- www.gavinmortimer.com

Gavin Nicholas Mortimer is a British writer.

== Career ==
Educated at Mill Hill School in north London, Mortimer's first book, the critically acclaimed Fields of Glory: the extraordinary lives of 16 warrior sportsmen was published in 2001 and described by the Sunday Telegraph as "inspiring reading". Mortimer authored Stirling's Men in 2004, which covered rugby international and SAS commander Paddy Mayne, as well as other members of SAS 'Originals'. Mars & Minerva, the SAS regimental journal' described the book as "a fascinating insight into the Regiment's birth and its early years".

Mortimer has subsequently written histories of the Special Boat Squadron, Merrill's Marauders and the Long Range Desert Group, drawing on interviews with the men who served in these Special Forces units. He caused controversy in 2016 when he suggested that today's special forces lack the mental toughness of their forebears.

Mortimer has acted as a consultant to several television documentaries including the three-part BBC series about the wartime SAS, which was broadcast in 2017.

In addition to his military history, Mortimer has written several narrative non-fiction books, including The Great Swim, about the race to become the first woman to swim the English Channel. Dramatised on BBC Radio 4 in 2010,

He has contributed to BBC History magazine, History Revealed, WW2 magazine and The Spectator.

== Publications ==
Non-fiction

- Fields of Glory (2001), ISBN 1472122097
- Stirling's Men: inside story of the SAS in WW2 (2004) ISBN 0304367060
- Longest Night (2005) ISBN 0297846388
- The Great Swim (2007) ISBN 1906021384
- Chasing Icarus (2008) ISBN 080271711X
- Double Death (2009) ISBN 0802717691
- The Blitz (2010) ISBN 1849084246
- The Daring Dozen (2011) ISBN 184908842X
- The SAS in WW2 (2012) ISBN 1472808754
- A History of Football in 100 Objects (2012) ISBN 1781250618
- A History of Cricket in 100 Objects (2013) ISBN 1846689406
- Merrill's Marauders (2013) ISBN 0760344329
- The SBS in WW2 (2014) ISBN 1472811135
- The First Eagles (2015) ISBN 0760346399
- The Men Who Made the SAS (2015) ISBN 1472122097
- History of the Long Range Desert Group in WW2 (2017) ISBN 1472819330
- Guidance from the Greatest: What the World War Two Generation can teach us (2020) ISBN 1472135121
- The SAS in Occupied France: 1 SAS Operations, June to October 1944 (2021) ISBN 152676962X
- Z Special Unit: The Elite Allied World War II Guerrilla Force (2022) ISBN 1472847091
- David Stirling: The Phoney Major: The Life, Times and Truth about the Founder of the SAS (2022) ISBN 1472134591
- 2 SAS: Bill Stirling and the forgotten special forces unit of World War II (2023). Oxford: Osprey Publishing. ISBN 1472856732

Children's

- The Ultimate Guide to Rugby (2007) ISBN 0141323213
- The Story of Yellow Leaf: Journal of a Sioux Girl (2008) ISBN 0764161091
- The Voyage of Shackleton's Endurance (2008) ISBN 0717143015
