= Frank Gavin =

Frank Gavin may refer to:

- Francis Gavin, professor of political science at Johns Hopkins University
- Frank S. B. Gavin (1890–1938), American Anglican priest and theologian
