= Gavin MacKenzie (sociologist) =

British political scientist and sociologist

Gavin George Newing MacKenzie (8 March 1942 – 18 September 2001) was a British political scientist and sociologist.

== Life ==
Gavin George Newing MacKenzie was born on 8 March 1942 in Bournemouth, where he attended the grammar school. He then studied sociology at the University of Leicester before graduating in 1964. He went to study at Brown University, where he completed a Master of Arts degree (supervised by Kurt B. Mayer and awarded in 1966) and a doctorate; supervised by Sidney Goldstein, his PhD was awarded in 1970 for his thesis "Middle-class craftsman: A test of selected aspects of the thesis of embourgeoisement in the United States". He was a lecturer in sociology at the University of Leicester (1968–70) and then in 1970 joined the University of Cambridge as a Fellow of Jesus College, Cambridge, and as a faculty assistant lecturer (1970–73); at Jesus College, he was a tutor from 1972 and senior tutor in 1982. While at Cambridge, he collaborated with Anthony Giddens. In 1992, he left academia to work for the consultancy Saxton Bampfylde Hever. He died aged 59, on 18 September 2001 in London.
