= Gavin Jarvie =

Scottish footballer

Personal information
- Date of birth: 20 January 1879
- Place of birth: Newton, South Lanarkshire, Scotland
- Date of death: 25 July 1957 (aged 78)
- Place of death: Cleland, North Lanarkshire, Scotland
- Position: Defender

Senior career*
| Years | Team | Apps | (Gls) |
| 1900–1901 | Cambuslang Rangers | | |
| 1901–1904 | Airdrieonians | | |
| 1904–1907 | Bristol Rovers | 89 | (1) |
| 1907–1911 | Sunderland | 96 | (2) |
| 1911–? | Hamilton Academical | | |
- * Club domestic league appearances and goals

Gavin Jarvie (20 January 1879 – 25 July 1957) was a Scottish footballer who played as a defender for clubs including Bristol Rovers and Sunderland.

== Career ==
Jarvie was born in Newton, Scotland. He made his debut for Sunderland on 2 September 1907 against Manchester City in a 5–2 defeat at Roker Park. He played for Sunderland from 1907 to 1911, making 95 league appearances while scoring two goals.
