= Gavin Wildridge Johnstone =

Australian ornithologist

Gavin Wildridge Johnstone (1941–1987) was an Australian ornithologist who grew up and was educated in Scotland. He completed his PhD thesis on the ecology and behaviour of Black Grouse, at the University of Aberdeen in 1969. He moved to Australia in 1969 to participate in the 1970 Australian National Antarctic Research Expedition (ANARE). There he wintered on Macquarie Island and worked on speciation in Giant Petrels. With the Australian Antarctic Division he made further visits to Australia's subantarctic islands and to Antarctica, subsequently publishing many papers on the biology of Antarctic and subantarctic seabirds. He also served as Review Editor for the Royal Australasian Ornithologists Union's journal Emu.
