= Frankie Gavin =

Frankie Gavin may refer to:

- Frankie Gavin (musician) (born 1956), fiddle player of traditional Irish music
- Frankie Gavin (boxer) (born 1985), British boxer
