= Gavin Hyman =

Academic background
- Education: University of Exeter (MA); Peterhouse, Cambridge (PhD)

Academic work
- Discipline: Theology, Philosophy
- Institutions: Lancaster University

Gavin Hyman (born in 1974) is a British philosopher and theologian and a Senior Lecturer in the School of Global Affairs (formerly the Department of Politics, Philosophy and Religion) at Lancaster University. He has published widely on theology, continental philosophy and politics.

== Career ==
Hyman read theology at the University of Exeter and Peterhouse, Cambridge, where he wrote his PhD thesis on postmodern theology under the supervision of Graham Ward. A revised version of the thesis was later published as The Predicament of Postmodern Theology: Radical Orthodoxy or Nihilist Textualism?. In 1999, he joined Lancaster University, where he was promoted to Senior Lecturer in 2013. In addition to his academic work, Hyman has served in various managerial roles at Lancaster University. From 2011 to 2018 he was the University Public Orator.

== Books by Gavin Hyman ==
- The Predicament of Postmodern Theology: Radical Orthodoxy or Nihilist Textualism?, Westminster: John Knox Press, 2001. ISBN 978-0-664-22366-3
- New directions in philosophical theology: essays in honour of Don Cupitt. Aldershot: Ashgate, 2004.
- A Short History of Atheism., London: I B Tauris, 2010. ISBN 978-1-84885-137-5
- Traversing the middle: ethics, politics, religion. Eugene, Oregon: Cascade Books, 2013.
- Confronting Secularism in Europe and India: Legitimacy and Disenchantment in Contemporary Times, co-edited with Brian Black and Graham M. Smith. London: Bloomsbury, 2014.
- Agnosticism: Explorations in Philosophy and Religious Thought, co-edited with Francis Fallon. Oxford: Oxford University Press, 2020.
- Keeping the Red Flag Flying: The Labour Party in Opposition since 1922, co-written with Mark Garnett and Richard Johnson. Cambridge: Polity, 2024.
