= Gavin Yates =

Anglican Dean

Gavin Harrison Yates was Anglican Dean of Nelson from 1970 until 1981.

Yates was educated at the University of Canterbury and ordained in 1962. His first post was a curacy at Saint Paul's Cathedral, Wellington. He was assistant director of the Diocese of Wellington's Christian Education Council then Vicar of Westport before his appointment as Dean. Yates was also interim Dean of Dunedin during 2008.
