= Gavin Garrison =

American director (born 1987)

Gavin Garrison (born March 14, 1987) is a director and reality television show producer who produced the long-running Discovery series "Whale Wars." Garrison, a graduate of the University of Southern California's School of Cinematic Arts and UC Santa Barbara used his travels to become an author on adventure conservation. His projects have taken him from his home in Los Angeles, CA to filming in China's remote Mongolian plains, the icy waters off the coast of Antarctica, the Romanian highlands, and the jungles of Costa Rica.

== Career ==
Garrison got his start in Hollywood working as a production assistant on the set of the Fox television show "The OC"." He then went on to work on other hit shows "Mad Men" and "Entourage" as a technical consultant. He has produced two seasons of the Emmy-nominated reality show "Whale Wars", and he set up and runs the Hollywood-based commercial production company, Red Apple Production.

In 2015, he shot the first-ever recorded aerial footage of a Blue whale and her calf nursing near the coast of Antarctica. The footage went on to spark a conversation about the role of drones in modern conservation efforts and has become a topic in the world of unmanned aircraft. A new term for the movement was coined in a November 2015 interview with Garrison as "Conservation 2.0.". Garrison now speaks on the topic worldwide. He produced six episodes of "Whale Wars," which includes four major specials and four documentary films.

Gavin Garrison has written over a dozen articles on the use of unmanned aircraft for filmmaking and conservation, and has become a special contributor to drone publications like RotorDrone magazine.
