= Jason Gavin =

Jason Gavin may refer to:

- Jason Gavin (footballer) (born 1980), Irish football player
- Jason Gavin (writer), television writer
