= Gavin Weightman =

British journalist and documentarian (1945–2022)

- Born: 4 March 1945; Gosforth, Northumberland, England
- Died: 18 December 2022 (aged 77); Whitechapel, London, England
- Occupation(s): Journalist and documentary filmmaker
- Children: 3

Gavin Weightman (4 March 1945 – 18 December 2022) was a British journalist and documentary filmmaker who specialised in the social history of London and Britain from the 18th century.

His books included The Making of Modern London, co-authored in 1983 with Steve Humphries (re-issued in 2007 by Ebury Press); The Frozen Water Trade (2003), Signor Marconi's Magic Box (2003), and The Industrial Revolutionaries (2007). Weightman's journalism included many articles for New Society magazine in the 1970s.

== Early life ==
Gavin Weightman was born on 4 March 1945 in Gosforth, Northumberland, England, to Doreen (née Wade), a teacher and translator, and John Weightman, a broadcaster. The family lived in West Hampstead, but spent the summers in Northumberland. He attended Haberdashers' Boys' School with a scholarship, but left there aged 17 to start a career as a journalist.

In 1967, he started a degree in sociology at Bedford College, London.

== Career ==
After leaving school, Weightman worked on the Brighton and Evening Angus and the Richmond and Twickenham Times.

In 1974, he began work for New Society magazine. From 1978 to 1982, he worked as a reporter and presenter for The London Programme.

For London Weekend Television, he produced and directed The Making of Modern London (1815–1914), The River Thames, Bright Lights Big City, Brave New Wilderness, and City Safari, among other series.

== Personal life ==
Weightman's first marriage to Myra Wilkins ended in divorce. Together they had two children.

In 2009, Weightman married Clare Beaton, a children's author and illustrator, after a long-term relationship. They had one son.

Weightman lived in north London and latterly concentrated on writing social history books. He died at the Royal London Hospital on 18 December 2022, at the age of 77.

== Publications (selected) ==
- 1983: The Making of Modern London, 1815-1914, with Stephen Humphries (Sidgwick & Jackson)
- 1984: The Making of Modern London, 1914-1939, with Stephen Humphries (Sidgwick & Jackson)
- 1986: City Safari: Wildlife in London, with Mike Birkhead (Sidgwick & Jackson)
- 1987: Christmas Past, with Stephen Humphries (Sidgwick & Jackson)
- 1990: London River: The Thames Story (Collins & Brown)
- 1991: The Seaside (Collins & Brown)
- 1991: Picture Post Britain (Collins & Brown)
- 1991: London Past (Collins & Brown)
- 1992: Bright Lights, Big City: London entertained, 1830-1950 (Collins & Brown)
- 1992: Rescue: The history of Britain's emergency services (Boxtree, Channel Four)
- 1998: Polar Explorers (Explorers and Exploration series, Grolier Educational)
- 1998: North America (Explorers and Exploration series, Grolier Educational)
- 2003: Signor Marconi's Magic Box: The Most Remarkable Invention of the 19th Century & The Amateur Inventor Whose Genius Sparked a Revolution (Da Capo Press)
- 2003: What the Industrial Revolution Did for Us (BBC)
- 2003: The Frozen-Water Trade: A true story (Hyperion)
- 2005: London's Thames: The river that shaped a city and its history (St Martin's Press)
- 2007: The Industrial Revolutionaries: The creation of the modern world, 1776-1914 (Atlantic)
- 2007: The Making of Modern London: A People's History of the Capital from 1815 to the present day (Ebury Press)
- 2011: Children of Light: How electricity changed Britain forever (Atlantic)
- 2011: Restoration Home: The essential guide to tracing the history of your house (BBC Books)
- 2012: Secrets of a Titanic Victim: The story of the Real My Fair Lady ( backstory.la)
- 2015: Eureka: How invention happens (Yale University Press)
- 2020: The Great Inoculator: The untold story of Daniel Sutton and his medical revolution (Yale University Press)
