= Gabino Espinoza =

Mexican footballer (born 1991)

Personal information
- Full name: Gabino Antonio Espinoza Ruíz
- Date of birth: 17 January 1991 (age 35)
- Place of birth: Magdalena de Kino, Sonora, Mexico
- Height: 1.83 m (6 ft 0 in)
- Position: Goalkeeper

Senior career*
Years	Team	Apps	(Gls)
2007–2008	Héroes de Caborca	0	(0)
2008–2009	Búhos de Hermosillo	1	(0)
2009–2011	Héroes de Caborca	37	(0)
2013–2024	Cimarrones de Sonora	208	(1)
2024–2025	Celaya	15	(0)
2025	Atlante	0	(0)
2026	Tlaxcala	0	(0)
- * Club domestic league appearances and goals as of 12 April 2025

Gabino Antonio Espinoza Ruíz (born 17 January 1991) is a Mexican professional footballer who plays as a goalkeeper.

Espinoza began his career at age 16 with the Héroes de Caborca of the Tercera División. In 2013, he signed with newly-formed club Cimarrones de Sonora. After 11 years with the club, Espinoza joined Celaya in July 2024.
