= Gavin Y. Oudit =

Canadian cardiologist and clinician-scientist

- Spouse: Zamaneh Kassiri

Academic background
- Education: BSc, MSc, PhD, 2005, University of Toronto; MD, 1998, University of Toronto Faculty of Medicine
- Thesis: Role of L-type Ca²[superscript]+ channel and oxidative stress in the pathogenesis of iron-overload cardiomyopathy: calcium channel blockers and taurine as potential therapies. (2005)

Gavin Yadram Oudit FCAHS is a Canadian cardiologist and clinician-scientist. As a Tier 2 Canada Research Chair in Heart Failure at the University of Alberta, Oudit also serves as Director of the Heart Function Clinic and Mazankowski Alberta Heart Institute.

== Early life and education ==
Oudit completed his Bachelor of Science and Master of Science degree at the University of Toronto and his medical degree at the University of Toronto Faculty of Medicine (U of T). Upon graduating, he remained at the institution to complete his training in internal medicine and adult cardiology. Oudit then accepted a four-year post-doctoral fellowship in the molecular biology of heart failure.

== Career ==
Upon completing his training, Oudit joined the faculty at the University of Alberta (U of A) as a Mazankowski Heart Institute scientist. In this role, he received the 2010 McDonald Scholarship from the Heart and Stroke Foundation to fund his research on super enzymes. Based on his research, Oudit helped established the human explanted heart program (HELP) at the institution aimed at translating discoveries to help people live better and longer lives. As an associate professor in the Faculty of Medicine & Dentistry, Oudit also oversaw a study that found a deficiency in the peptide apelin was associated with heart failure, pulmonary hypertension and diabetes.

Due to his overall research success, Oudit was the recipient of a Tier 2 Canada Research Chair in Heart Failure in 2014. In this new role, Oudit's research team discovered ACE2, a molecule that works to naturally block the renin-angiotensin system and correct any imbalance. Based on this, they created a recombinant version of that protein to turn it into a drug. In 2019, Oudit's research team identified a key molecule named PI3K alpha that binds to gelsolin and suppresses it. As a result of this discovery, Oudit hypothesized that they could develop new treatments that could help counter the threat. Later that year, Oudit used mice studies to pinpoint a link between a peptide and a reduction of abdominal aortic aneurysms.

During the COVID-19 pandemic, Oudit's research team examined circulating angiotensin peptide levels in the blood of over 100 individuals who were experiencing heart failure due to a heart attack or stroke. Following this, Oudit also led a collaborative study between U of A and teams from Cambridge, Boston, and Berlin to use analytical techniques to sequence the ribonucleic acids in nine types of single cells from six regions of the heart. His work was later recognized with an appointment to become a Fellow of the Canadian Academy of Health Sciences.

== Personal life ==
Oudit is married to Zamaneh Kassiri, a fellow U of A professor.
