= Gavin Robinson (model agent) =

South African model agent

Lawrence Gavin Bertran Robinson (25 October 1935 – 2002) was a South African model agent in London's Old Bond Street in the 1960s and 70s who was part of the Swinging London scene. His show at Mare Moda in Capri in 1969 was described by The Times as "as zippy, as nippy and as hippy as anything seen in London's West End", while a show for Harrods in 1970 was noted for his technique of making his models move to music like machines.

== Early life ==
Lawrence Robinson was from Durban, South Africa, born on 25 October 1935. He worked as a male model early in his life.

== Career ==
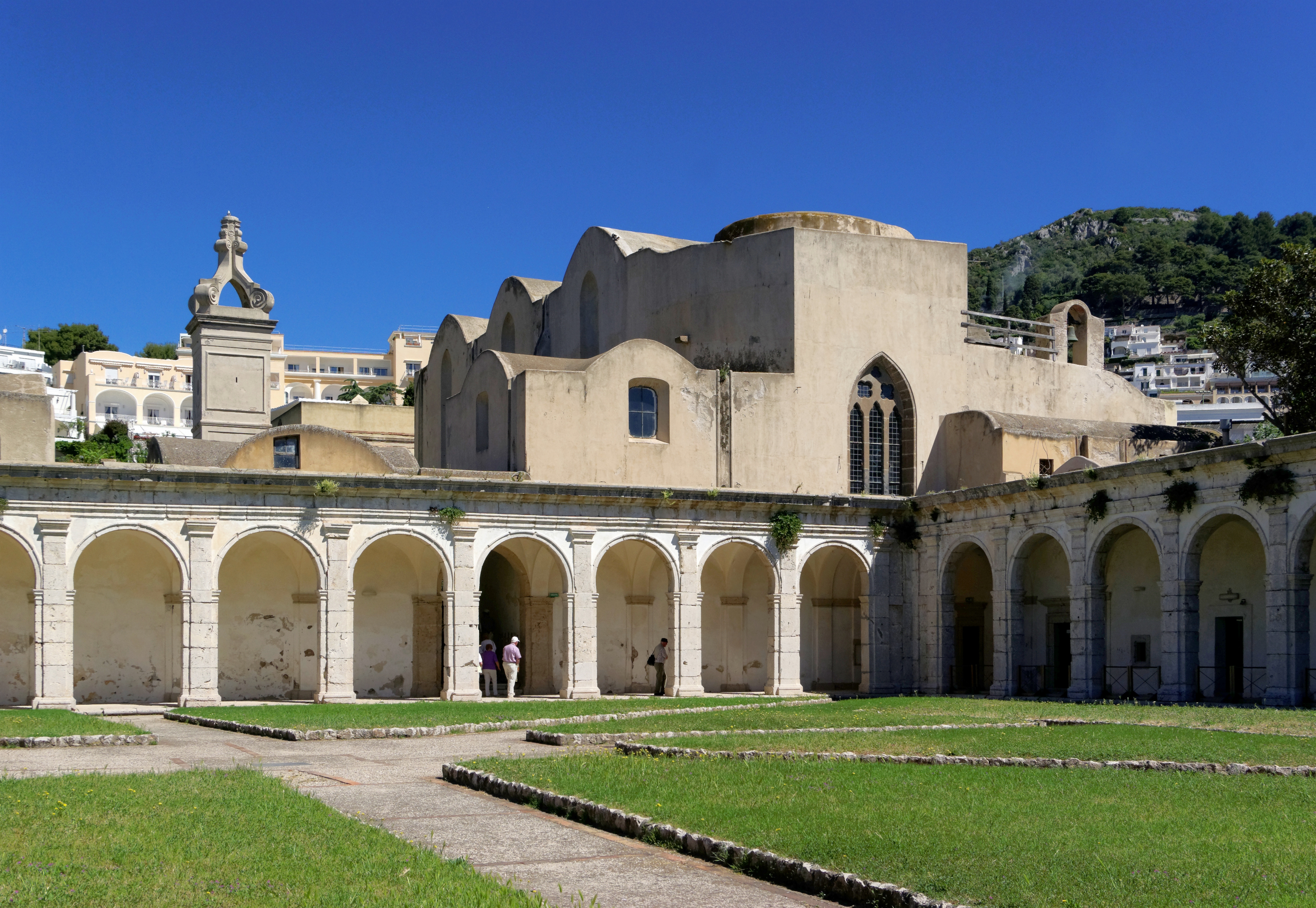
Courtyard of the Certosa di San Giacomo, Capri

In the mid 1960s, Robinson established a business as a model agent at 30 Old Bond Street in London where he traded as Gavin L. B. Robinson. According to the memoirs of Jo Wood, who was signed to the agency as a teenager in the mid 1960s, it was "one of the hottest" in London at the time and Robinson was "very slim, trendy and had startlingly blond hair". Wood recalled that she "couldn't work out why he was so flamboyant, so ...feminine". Other models on Robinson's books in the 1960s included Nikki Ross and Sonia Pugin. Barbara Molyneux claimed that the first ever head sheet was created for Robinson by Peter Marlowe by 1968.

In 1969, Robinson put on a show for 1,000 people in the courtyard of the Certosa di San Giacomo, a Carthusian monastery in Capri, for the finale of the Mare Moda festival. It was described by Antony King-Deacon of The Times as "as zippy, as nippy and as hippy as anything seen in London's West End". According to King-Deacon, Maria Antonelli's models "were thrashing about with their arms and legs in a sort of frenzied apathy. On they ran, harem-scarem, wiggle, scream and they were gone." No one really saw or remembered the clothes, he complained. Robinson also produced the finale for the 1970 Mare Moda.

In March 1970, he put on a show at the Harrods department store titled "Return of the Blues" that King-Deacon saw as unusual in giving a major role to men's clothes, although the female models still outnumbered the men. King-Deacon praised Robinson for his ability to put on "without apparent effort a fashion show of unparalleled chic" and noted his technique of using models "as though they were machines by making them walk, turn, bend and even bat their eyelids to the beat of the music". Gavin continued to produce Harrods Fashion Shows throughout the 70's using many of the same models, Christer, Greg Sherriff, Brian King, Ian Buchanan, Alan McVie, Georgie, Iona Skye, Charlie Brown (former Miss South Africa) and Christian Fletcher. He Drove an old Bentley and held weekends for his models and a few photographers at his retreat "the Barn" in Horsmonden near Goudhurst, Kent. He loved cooking, collecting Owls (ceramic etc) and renovating his various houses in the Chelsea area. [11]

Robinson later traded as Gavin's Models. In the mid 1970s, the male models at Gavin's were run by the former male model Gil Barber.

== Death and legacy ==
Robinson died in Camden, London, in 2002. In 2013, he featured as a character in Raymond Russell's novel Deadly Endings.
