= Gavín =

- Locality
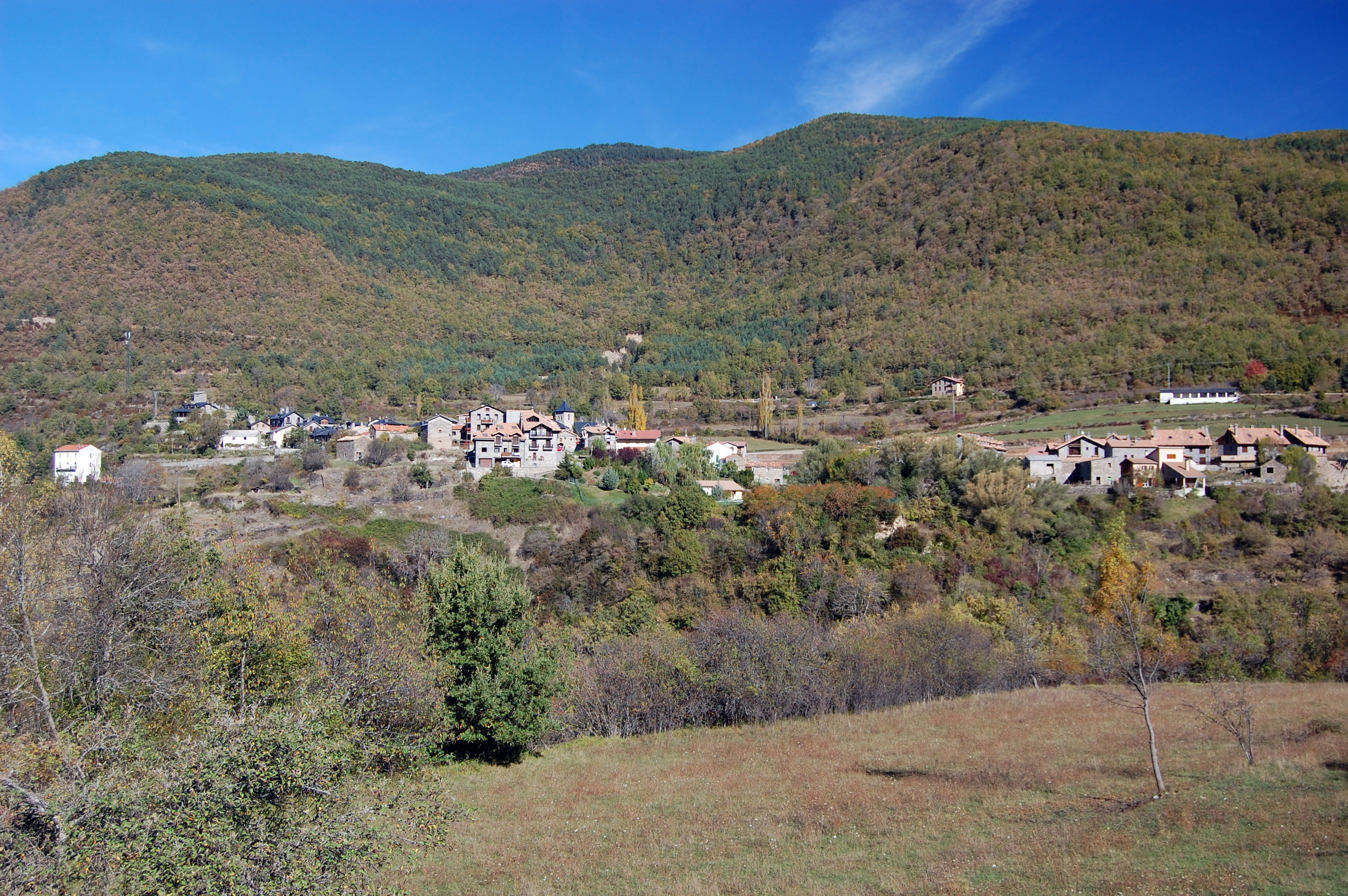

- Location in Spain
- Country: Spain
- Autonomous region: Aragon
- Province: Huesca
- Comarca: Alto Gállego
- Municipality: Biescas
- Elevation: 974 m (3,196 ft)

Population
  - Total: 95 hab.
- Time zone: CET
  - Summer (DST): CEST

Gavín (Aragonese: Gabín) is a Spanish locality situated in the municipality of Biescas. (Alto Gállego, Huesca, Aragon). The locality is at 974 Metres in altitude and is located in the Tena Valley. Its name seems to come from the Latin anthroponym Gapius.

== Demography ==
In 2019, the population of Gavín was 95, 5 less than the year before. From 2000 to 2019 the population had an increase of 21 people. The peak population of 103 was reached in 2017.

Demographic Evolution
2000	2004	2008	2012	2016	2019
74	78	90	95	91	95

== Historic Buildings ==
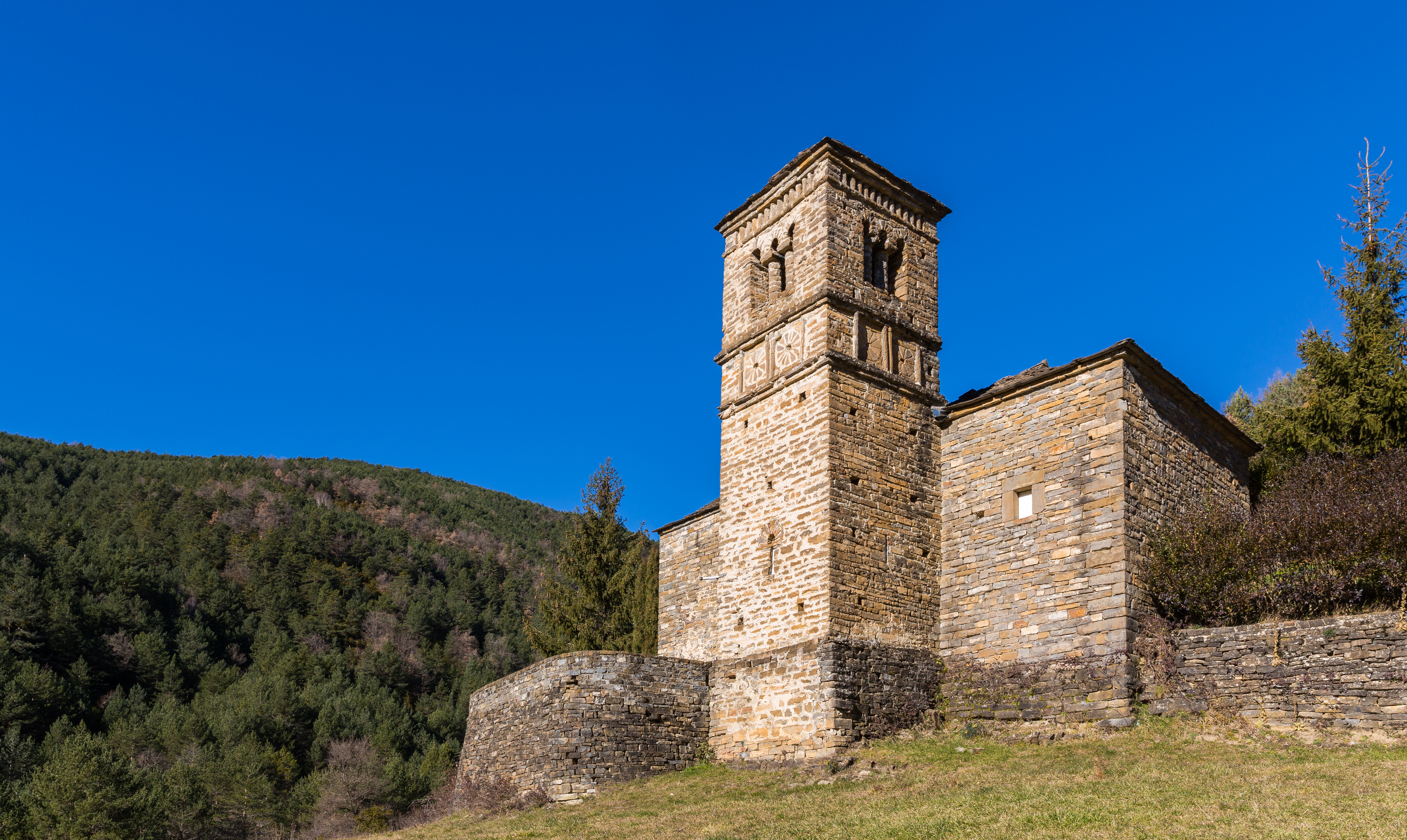
The Church of Saint Bartholomew north of Gavín

=== Church of Saint Bartholomew ===
The Church of Saint Bartholomew forms part of the Serrablo churches, it uses early-Romanesque and Mozarabic design. The church was thought to have been built in the 10th or 11th century. The building has a nave finished off by an apse, a bell tower with Horseshoe arched windows. The church is located north-east of Gavín near the confluence of Saint Bartholomew and several ravines.

=== Monastery of Saint Pelagius ===
The Monastery of Saint Pelagius also forms part of the Serrablo churches, it uses early-Romanesque and Mozarabic design. The monastery was excavated in 1997 and is hypothesised to have been built in the 10th or 11th century. The excavations conducted found that the monastery had two adjacent churches, a tower, a dormitory and other monastic buildings. The monastery is located on the left bank of the River Sia a few kilometres away from Gavín.

== Celebrations ==
- 11 February: Saint William
- 26 June: The pilgrimage to the monastery of Saint Pelay
- 24, 25, 26 August: Saint Bartholomew
- 24 August: The celebration of the religious pilgrimage made by Saint Bartholomew
