= Gavin Sutherland =

Gavin Sutherland may refer to:

- The Sutherland Brothers, Gavin and Iain Sutherland
- Gavin Sutherland (archer) (born 1979), Zimbabwean archer
- Gavin Sutherland (conductor) (born 1972), conductor, composer/arranger and pianist
- Gavin Sutherland (politician) (1893–1970), Australian politician
