= Selby College =

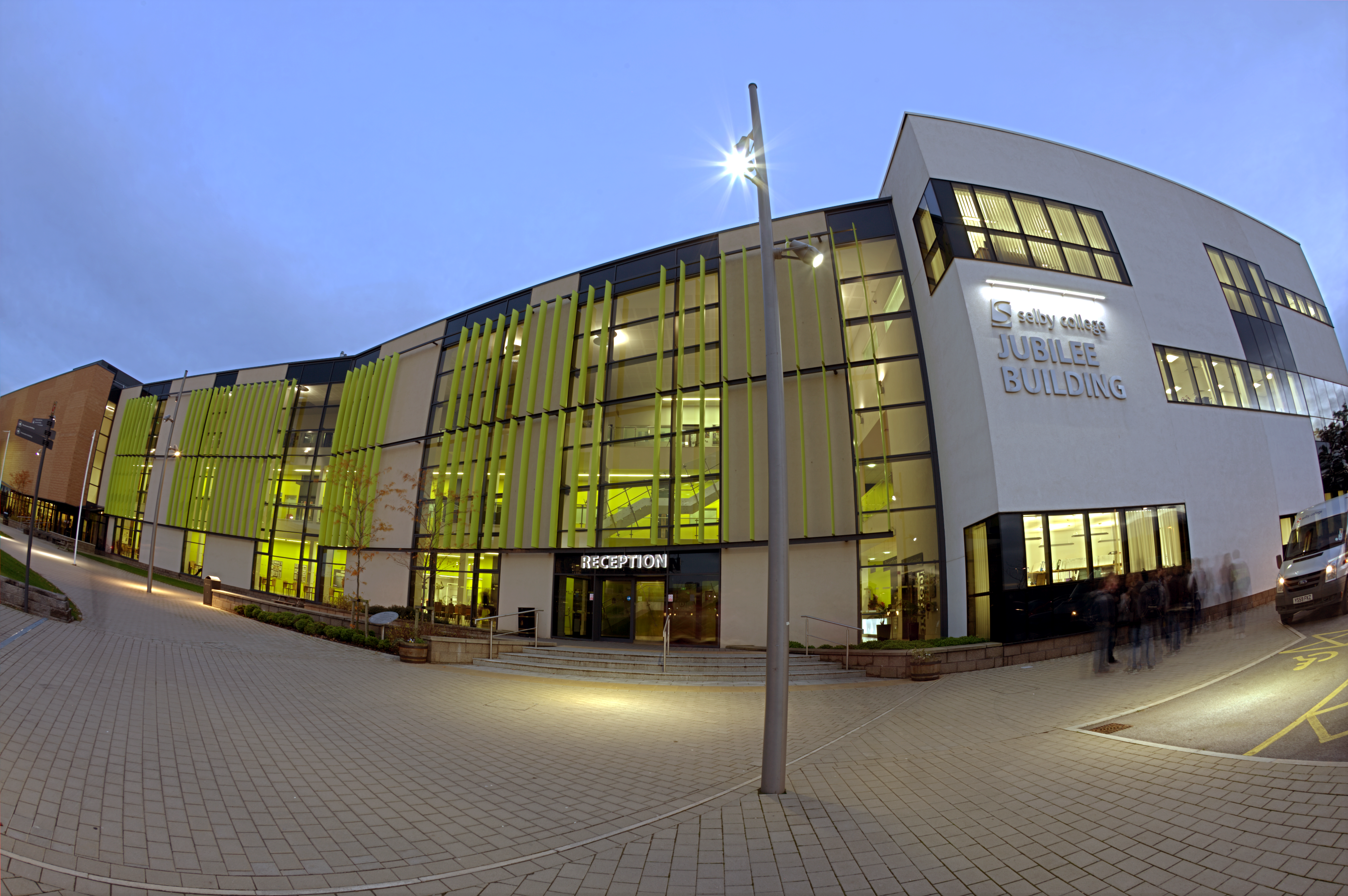
- Jubilee Building - November 2013

Location
- Abbot's Road; Selby, North Yorkshire, YO8 8AT; England; 53.77532°N 1.05244°W

Information
- Type: General Further Education College
- Motto: One of England's Top Performing Colleges
- Established: 1984
- Ofsted: Reports
- Chair of Corporation: Richard Stiff
- Principal: Phil Sayles
- Staff: 350+
- Age: 14 to 80+
- Enrolment: 5,500
- Provision offered: Further Education and Higher Education
- Types of education: A levels, Vocational Qualifications, Apprenticeships, Higher Education and Adult Education.
- Website: http://www.selby.ac.uk/

Selby College is a tertiary college, offering A Level courses through its Sixth Form Academy, work-related vocational courses, apprenticeships, business training and adult education courses. It is located in Selby, North Yorkshire, England. The College is a provider of A levels and vocational education for sixteen to eighteen year olds. Selby provides apprenticeships, higher education including foundation degrees, honours degrees and HND/HNC level qualifications as well as workforce training.

The College catchment area is mainly North Yorkshire, but it also stretches into the East Riding of Yorkshire and Northern Doncaster. The apprenticeship and higher education provision draws from the whole of Yorkshire and the Humber and beyond.

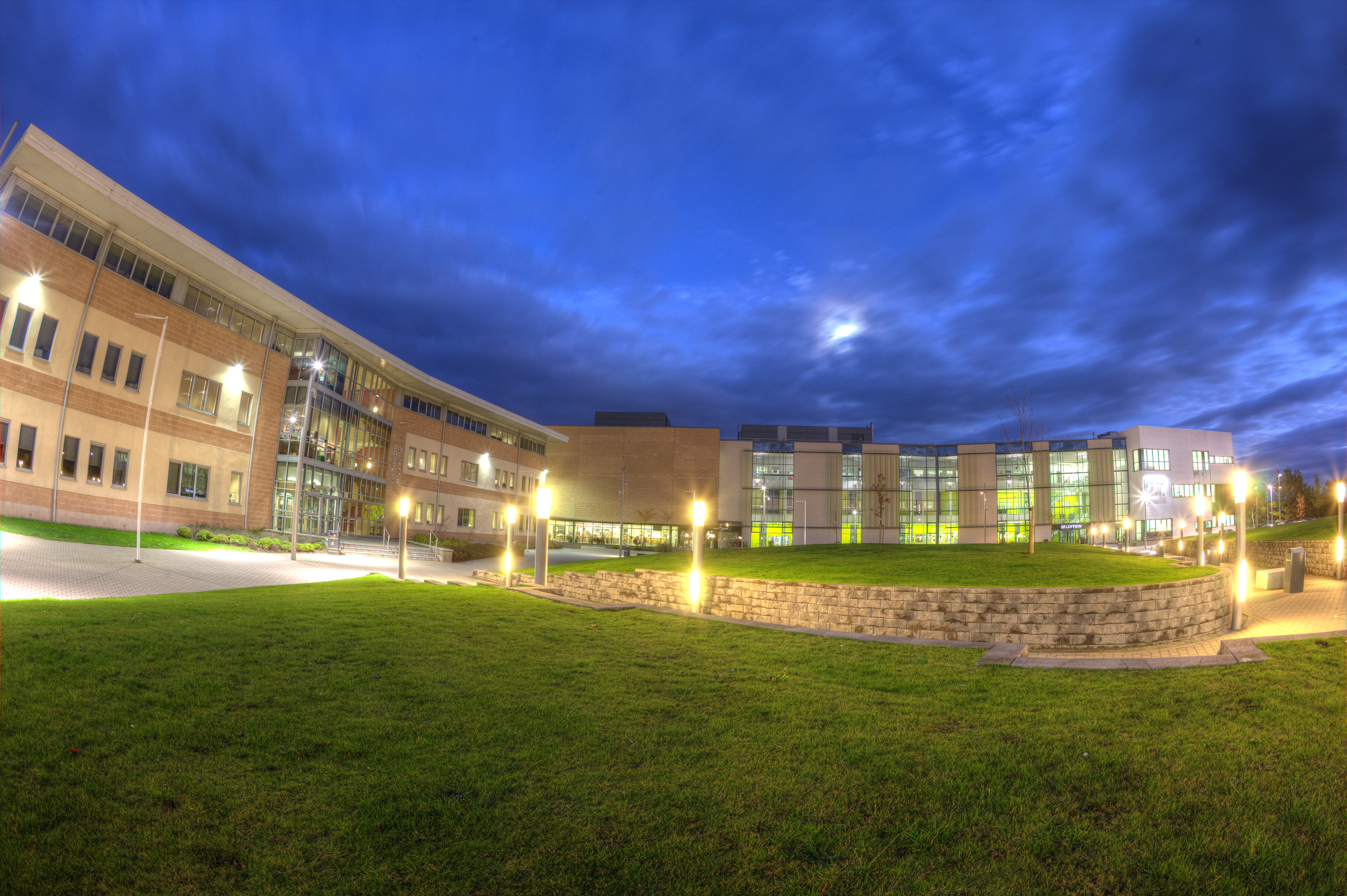
Academy Building - November 2013

Selby College merged with Wakefield College in March 2022 to form Heart of Yorkshire Education Group.

== History ==
Selby College was founded in 1984, on the site of a former secondary school that was built in the 1950s.

Allan Stewart (OBE) was the college principal from 1992 to September 2018. He was responsible for funding the major redevelopment project at the college between 2004 and 2010 that replaced the old school buildings. The campus now consists of 5 major buildings; Innovation, Renaissance, Jubilee, Aspiration and the Sixth Form Academy. The latter features a plaque on its wall dedicated to Stewart.

The college has often been dubbed "One of England's top performing colleges", with students achieving some of the highest examination results in the country. In 2007 Selby College was described as "outstanding" in all five areas during its Ofsted inspection.

Since 2006, the college has shared its site with Brightstart Day Nursery.

In 2010, three students were injured during an end of term celebration after an inflatable "broke loose from its moorings".

== Courses ==
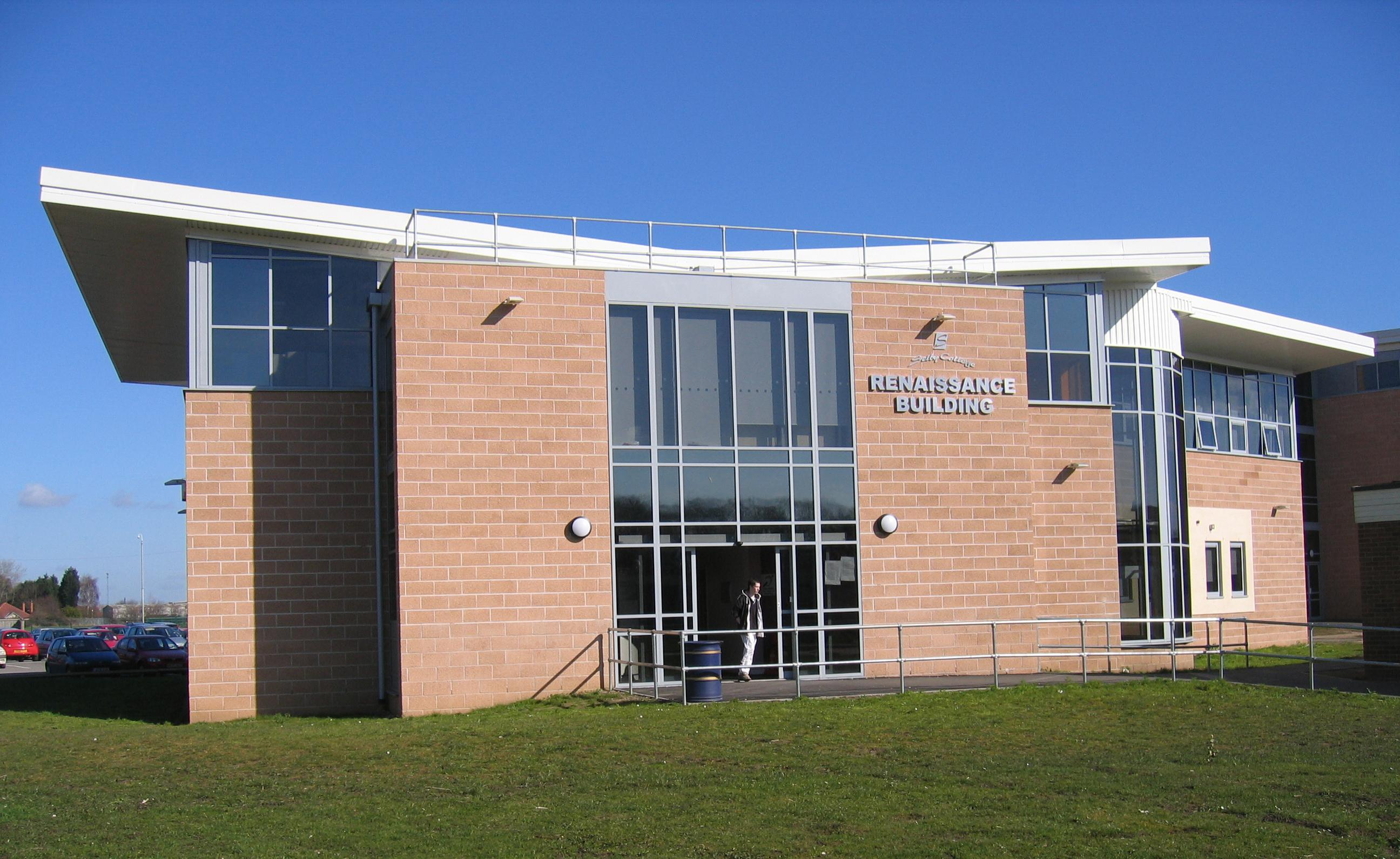
Selby College Renaissance Building

Selby College offers different levels of learning from Entry Level up to Degree courses. These courses include NVQ's in Engineering, Construction, Administration, Health and Social Care, and Hairdressing. The college also provides a wide range of A Level courses, as well as awards up to degree level from the University of Hull and Huddersfield University. The college also works with Edexcel to provide Higher National Certificates and Diplomas (HNC & HND).

Selby College provides vocational courses for 14 to 16-year-olds still in school. The college has won a series of awards for its hospitality and catering courses. The catering team won out of 20,000 applicants.

Alumni include Yorkshire designer Faye Hindle and journalist Tom Kershaw.

== Selby College Business Services ==
Selby College Business Services offers training and consultancy services to local businesses to help them meet their legislative and staff training and development needs.

The brands of Careskills and Powerskills are used by the College to identify the wider offer from apprenticeship to higher education for employers in Health and Social Care (Careskills) and Engineering (Powerskills) section.

== Examination Results ==
Selby College has some of the best examination results in the country, with an overall A Level pass rate in 2007 of 98% compared with a national 96% achievement rate.

For Level 3 Vocational qualifications in 2019 the college achieved an excellent score of 3 in terms of Alps data, with 78% of students gaining a Distinction grade, and of these 64% were triple Distinction. At A Level the college achieved an excellent Alps score of 3 and a 99.7% pass rate in all subjects.

Selby College's Higher Education and Degree-level provision came out as the ‘Best in Yorkshire’ for Overall Student Satisfaction in the National Student Survey (NSS) results for 2019. Overall Student Satisfaction came out at 93% for all programmes, significantly above the national average of 86%.
