= Gavin Fryer =

British philatelist

Gavin Harrap Fryer
- Occupation: Philatelist

Gavin Harrap Fryer was a British philatelist who signed the Roll of Distinguished Philatelists in 2011.

He was President of the Royal Philatelic Society from 2000 to 2003.
