= James Gavin =

James Gavin may refer to:

- James M. Gavin (1907–1990), United States Army general and ambassador to France
- Jim Gavin (born 1971), Irish Gaelic football manager and former player
- James Gavin (covenanter), tailor who had his ears cut off and was enslaved for refusing to renounce his faith

== See also ==
- Gavin James (disambiguation)
- James Galvin (disambiguation)
