= Patrick Gavin =

Northern Irish footballer

Personal information
- Full name: Peter Gavin
- Place of birth: Belfast, Northern Ireland
- Position: Left back

Senior career*
Years	Team	Apps	(Gls)
–1920	Cliftonville		
1920–1922	Blackpool	48	(0)

International career
1919	Ireland Amateurs	1	(0)
- * Club domestic league appearances and goals

Peter Gavin was a Northern Irish footballer who played as a left back in the Football League for Blackpool.
