= Gavin Fletcher =

Scottish footballer

Personal information
- Full name: Gavin Fletcher
- Date of birth: 30 October 1941 (age 85)
- Place of birth: Bellshill, Scotland
- Position: Inside forward

Youth career
- Shotts Bon Accord

Senior career*
Years	Team	Apps	(Gls)
1960–1961	Partick Thistle	2	(0)
1961–1963	Third Lanark	21	(2)
1963–1964	Bradford City	8	(1)
1964–1965	Stranraer	3	(0)
- Whitburn Junior
Total		34	(3)
- * Club domestic league appearances and goals

Gavin Fletcher (born 30 October 1941) is a Scottish former professional footballer who played as an inside forward.

== Career ==
Born in Bellshill, Fletcher played for Shotts Bon Accord, Partick Thistle, Third Lanark, Bradford City, Stranraer and Whitburn Junior.
