= John Gavin (disambiguation) =

John Gavin (1931–2018) was an American film actor and former United States Ambassador to Mexico.

John Gavin may also refer to:

- John Gavin (comedian) (born 1979), Scottish comedian
- Johnny Gavin (footballer) (1928–2007), Irish footballer, record goalscorer for Norwich City F.C.
- John Gavin (director) (1875–1938), Australian film director
- John Gavin (convict) (1829–1844), Australian convict
- Johnny Gavin (Rescue Me), fictional character on the American television series Rescue Me
