= Gavin Liddle =

English footballer and manager

Personal information
- Full name: Gavin Liddle
- Date of birth: 9 May 1963 (age 63)
- Place of birth: Houghton-le-Spring, England
- Position: Full back

Youth career
- Hartlepool United

Senior career*
Years	Team	Apps	(Gls)
1981–1983	Darlington	33	(4)
–	Spennymoor United		
–	Bishop Auckland		
1994–1996	Harrogate Town		
1996–1998	Birtley Town		
1999	Washington Nissan		
2000	Red House WMC		

Managerial career
- 1996–1998: Birtley Town (player-manager)
- 1998–1999: Harrogate Town
- 2000–2003: Washington Nissan
- 2003–2005: Prudhoe
- * Club domestic league appearances and goals

Gavin Liddle (born 9 May 1963) is an English former footballer who made 33 appearances in the Football League playing as a full back for Darlington in the 1980s. He also played non-league football for clubs including Spennymoor United, Bishop Auckland, Harrogate Town, Birtley Town, Washington Nissan, and Red House WMC. He went into coaching and management at a local level, as player-manager of Birtley Town, manager of Harrogate Town, coach and then for four years manager of Washington Nissan, with whom he won two Wearside League titles, and manager of Prudhoe.
