= Gavin Nisbet =

Scottish footballer

Personal information
- Full name: Gavin Nisbet
- Place of birth: Hamilton, Scotland
- Height: 5 ft 8 in (1.73 m)
- Position: Wing half

Senior career*
Years	Team	Apps	(Gls)
1927–1935	Preston North End	139	(6)
1935–1936	Burnley	2	(0)
1936–1937	Accrington Stanley	31	(0)
	Stalybridge Celtic	?	(?)
- * Club domestic league appearances and goals

Gavin Nisbet was a Scottish professional footballer who played as a wing half.
