= Gavin Swan =

Australian cricketer (born 1970)

Personal information
- Born: 30 October 1970 (age 56); Perth, Western Australia
- Source: Cricinfo, 10 November 2017

Gavin Swan (born 30 October 1970) is an Australian cricketer. He played eleven first-class matches for Western Australia between 1999/00 and 2001/02.
