= Gabino Sosa (comedian) =

Gabino Sosa Benítez (1938–2003) was a Uruguayan comedian, itinerant singer, popular musician. Born in Maldonado, he defined himself as Rochense by adoption. Throughout his artistic career, he recorded several phonograms solo or collectively with other minstrels such as Abel Soria.

== Career ==
Sosa Benítez also created several folkloric works, of which the best known are Comicidad y humorismo (Comedy and humor), Dos viejos mintiendo (Two old folks telling lies), Canto al guiso de porotos (Song to the stew of beans), Por arriba, por abajo (Above, below), Como brasa e´coronilla (Like coal and crown), Paloma y el palomo (Dove and pigeon), (Ethiological Concepts), Qué pastilla (What a pill), La rochense (The Rochan woman), Pueblito obrero (Pueblito worker) and Buen amigo (Good friend), among others.

He worked as an animator in many editions of the Rural del Prado. He was involved with the Montevideo Rural Radio through its program "Los payadores," (The minstrels) and Radio Durazno de Durazno. He also served as Coordinator of the Department of Culture of the Municipality of Flores.

He was a great promoter of the minstrel art, and through its counterpoints he earned the nickname La picana rochense (The rochense goad) for his picaresque character and sharp and mocking responses.

On November 16, 2003 he died in a car accident returning from a party held in Treinta y Tres. His companion, Teresa Santana Gonzalez, also died in this accident.

== Discography ==
- Sencillamente - (English: Simply)
- Abel Soria y Gabino Sosa (English: Abel and Soria) (with Abel Soria. Sondor 44213, 1982)
- El arte del payador vol. 1 (English: The art of the minstrel vol. 1) (with Carlos Molina. Ayuí / Tacuabé, 1982)
- Echando el resto en un truco (English: Throwing the rest into a trick) (Sondor 84323. 1983)
- Historias del perro Juan Moreira (English: Juan Moreira Dog Stories) (live)
- Muy en serio y medio en broma (English: Very serious and half joking) (Manchester 70156-4. 1990)
- Milongas de oreja an oreja (English: Tales from ear to ear) (Ge-Ese Productions. AGADU 1328-4. 1997)
