= Yuri Zhukov (dancer) =

Russian ballet dancer

- Born: 1964 (age 61–62)
- Education: Vaganova Academy of Russian Ballet
- Occupations: Ballet dancer, artistic director
- Era: 20th-21st century
- Organization(s): Kirov Ballet, San Francisco Ballet; Birmingham Royal Ballet; Zhukov Dance Theatre
- Known for: Ballet dancer; founder of Zhukov Dance Theatre
- Style: Classical ballet, contemporary dance
- Term: 2008–present

Yuri Zhukov (born 1964), is a Russian ballet dancer.

Zhukov trained at the Vaganova Academy of Russian Ballet in St. Petersburg, Russia.

Zhukov was a soloist with the Kirov Ballet and a principal dancer with the San Francisco Ballet and the Birmingham Royal Ballet.

In 2008, he founded Zhukov Dance Theatre, a contemporary dance company in San Francisco.
