= Gavinus =

Martyr and saint

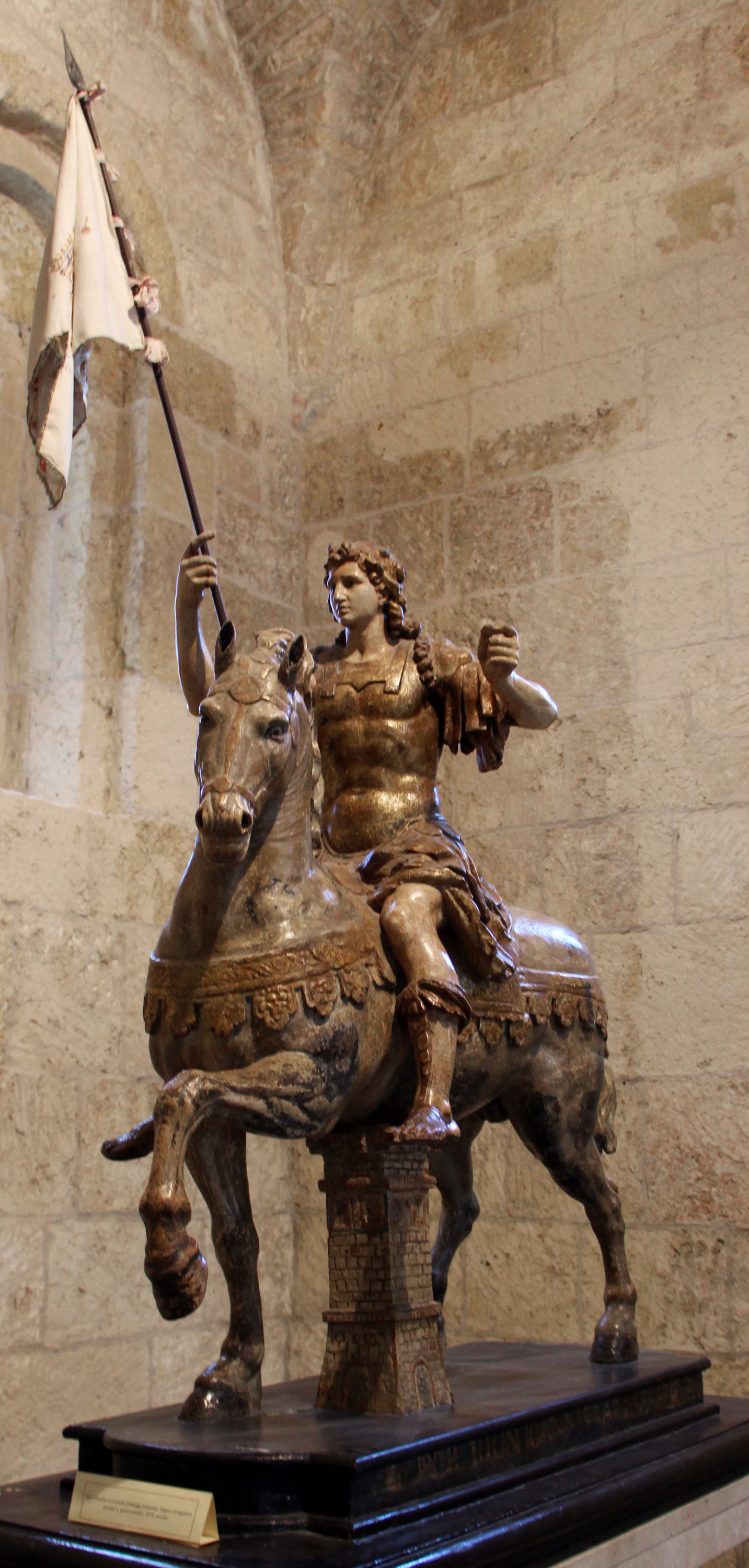
San Gavino (Porto Torres)

Gavinus (Italian: San Gavino) is a Christian saint who is greatly celebrated in Sardinia, Italy, as one of the Martyrs of Torres (Martiri turritani), along with his companions Protus, a bishop, and Januarius, a deacon.

== Narrative ==
He was a Roman soldier martyred for the Christian faith during the persecution of Diocletian in 304 in the city of Porto Torres (Latin: Turris), according to the legend, on the orders of the governor (preside) of Sardinia and Corsica, a certain Barbarus.

The earliest "passio" dates to the 12th century: Barbaro, who had been sent to Corsica and Sardinia, reached Turres and published the imperial edicts against the Christians, was denounced by Proto, Gavino and Gianuario. They were summoned to the tribunal and being steadfast in refusing to sacrifice to the gods, were summarily beheaded.

A second, longer, "passio", from the middle of the thirteenth century, follows standard medieval hagiographical conventions. In this, Protus and Januarius are arrested and subjected to torture. Gavinus is a soldier conveying them to prison. Impressed with their courage, he releases them and asks for their prayers. The next day Gavinus was arrested for failing to produce his prisoners, and when he declared himself a Christian, was beheaded on the shore. Hearing that Gavinus had preceded them in martyrdom, Protus and Januarius returned to the city, were arrested, and likewise beheaded. The story of the martyrdom was distributed in nine readings for use in the recitation of Matins.

== Legacy ==
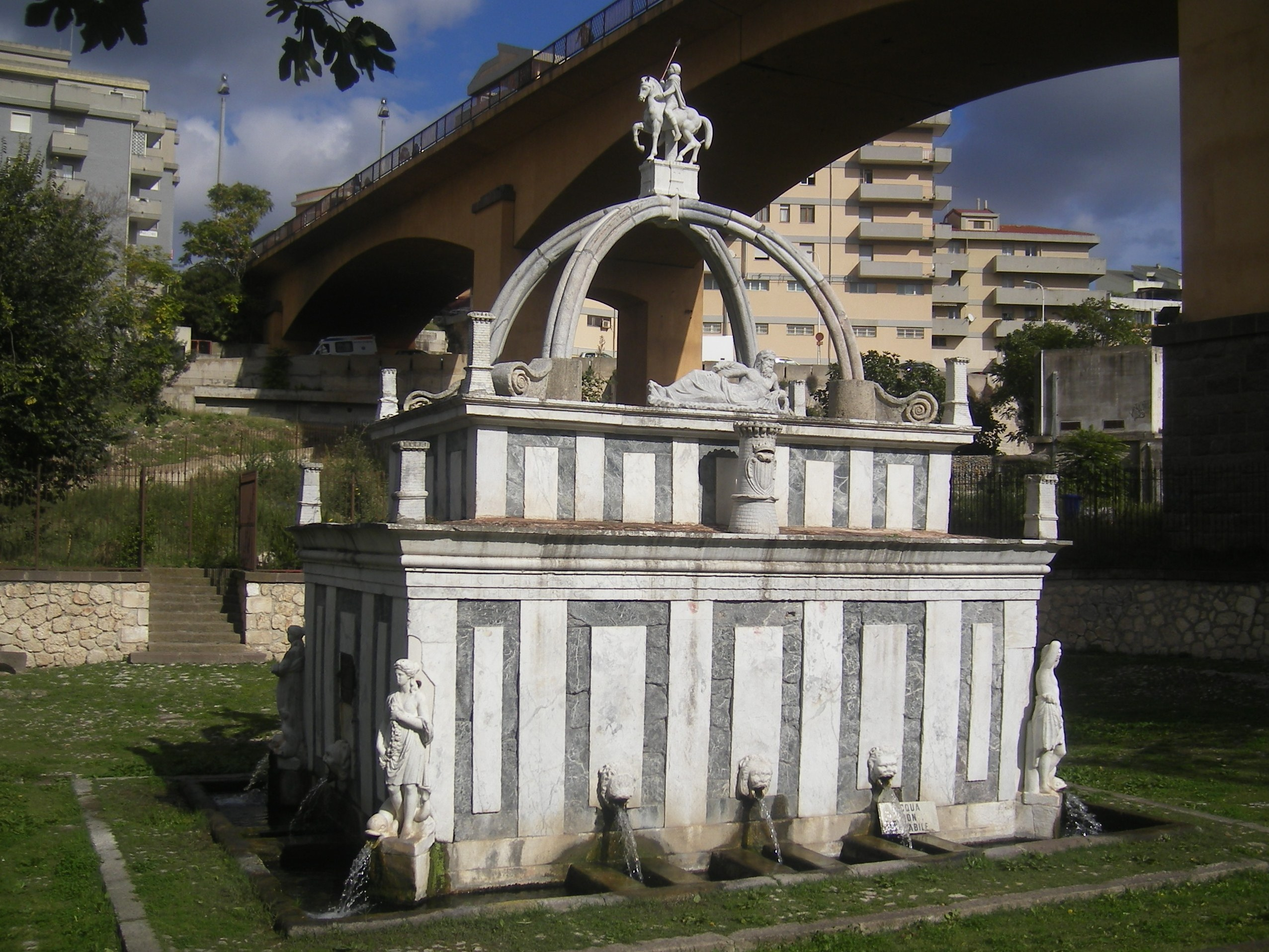
San Gavino atop the Fontana di Rosello, Sassari

The well-known Romanesque church of San Gavino in Gavoi is dedicated to him, as is the town of San Gavino Monreale, and a number of communes in Corsica.

The 11th-century Basilica of San Gavino in Porto Torres, is also dedicated to this saint. It was built by Comita or Gomida, Judge of Torres, and contains the relics, not only of Gavinus, but also of his companions, Protus and Januarius. According to legend, Gavinus appeared to Comita and requested he build the church. The relics of the saints were discovered in the crypt 1614.

== Patronage ==
Gavinus is one of the patron saints of Sassari.

Gavinus is the patron saint of Porto Torres, Sardinia, and of Camposano, Campania.

His feast day is given in the Roman Martyrology as 30 May.

== Sources ==
- Recent research on Saint Gavinus (in Italian)
- Church of San Gavino Martire in San Gavino Monreale (in Italian)
